= List of Wonder Woman creators =

Throughout DC Comics history, the mythos of Wonder Woman has changed dramatically. This list identifies some comics creators who made notable contributions with enduring impact.

== Creators of Wonder Woman ==
Name/tenure	Notable stories/titles	Notable characters (co-) created by	Notes
William Moulton Marston	All Star Comics #8 (1942); Comic Cavalcade #1, 3-10, 14, 16-17, 19-22, 24-25, 27 (1942-1948); Sensation Comics (1942-1948); Wonder Woman vol. 1 (1942-1948)	Queen Hippolyta; Steve Trevor; Etta Candy; Olympian Gods; Mala; Paula von Gunther; Priscilla Rich/Cheetah; Giganta; Doctor Psycho; Duke of Deception; Queen Clea; Princess Maru/Doctor Poison; Zara; Hypnota; Eviless	Concept, creator and writer.
H. G. Peter	All Star Comics #8 (1942); Comic Cavalcade #1, 3-10, 14, 16-17, 19-22, 24-25, 27 (1942-1948); Sensation Comics (1942-1948); Wonder Woman vol. 1 (1942-1948)	Queen Hippolyta; Steve Trevor; Etta Candy; Olympian Gods; Mala; Paula von Gunther; Priscilla Rich/Cheetah; Giganta; Doctor Psycho; Duke of Deception; Queen Clea; Princess Maru/Doctor Poison; Zara; Hypnota; Eviless	Artist as well as (uncredited) co-creator and developer.
Elizabeth Holloway Marston	All Star Comics #8 (1942); Comic Cavalcade #1, 3-10, 14, 16-17, 19-22, 24-25, 27 (1942-1948); Sensation Comics (1942-1948); Wonder Woman vol. 1 (1942-1948)	Queen Hippolyta; Steve Trevor; Etta Candy; Olympian Gods; Mala; Paula von Gunther; Priscilla Rich/Cheetah; Giganta; Doctor Psycho; Duke of Deception; Queen Clea; Princess Maru/Doctor Poison; Zara; Hypnota; Eviless	Co-creator and developer (uncredited).

- Olive Byrne — co-creator and developer (uncredited)

== Notable contributors ==
=== Writers ===
Name/tenure	Notable stories/titles	Notable characters (co-) created by	Notes
Joye Hummel	Sensation Comics; Wonder Woman vol. 1 (assistant writer/ghostwriter)	Byrna Brilyant/Blue Snowman; Queen Atomia; Minister Blizzard	First female to write superhero comics, though she went uncredited.
Robert Kanigher	Comic Cavalcade; Sensation Comics; Wonder Woman vol. 1 #30-176, 204-205, 207-211, 214, 217, 286 (1948-1968)	Circe; Nubia; Angle Man; Egg Fu; Mouse Man	
Dennis O'Neil	Wonder Woman vol. 1 #178-181, 199-201	Cylvia Anita Cyber/Doctor Cyber; I Ching	
Mike Sekowsky	Wonder Woman vol. 1 #182-198	Children of Ares; Cathy Perkins	
Len Wein	Wonder Woman #212 (1974); Wonder Woman vol. 2 #3-16 (1987-1988)		
Martin Pasko	Wonder Woman vol. 1 #218-232 (1975-1977)	Osira	
Gerry Conway	Wonder Woman vol. 1 #233–241, 259–285, 329	Deborah Domaine/Cheetah; Kung	
Roy Thomas	DC Retroactive: Wonder Woman - The '80s #1; Wonder Woman vol. 1 288-296, 300	Helen Alexandros/Silver Swan	
Mindy Newell	Wonder Woman #326-328 (1985); Wonder Woman vol. 2 #36-46, 49 (1989–1990)		First woman to get an ongoing writing credit for Wonder Woman.
George Pérez	Wonder Woman, vol. 2, #1–24, Annual #1 (among other artists) (1987–88); Wonder Woman #600 (among other artists) (2010)	Barbara Ann Minerva/Cheetah; Valerie Beaudry/Silver Swan; Philippus; Menalippe; Euboea; Julia and Vanessa Kapatelis; Myndi Mayer; Ed Indelicato; Decay; Urzkartaga	
Greg Potter	Wonder Woman, vol. 2, #1–2 (1987)		
William Messner-Loebs	Wonder Woman, vol. 2, #0, 63-64, 66-87, 90-100, Annual #3, Special #1 (1992-1995)	Artemis of Bana-Mighdall; Thomas Asquith Randolph/White Magician; Donna Milton; Ares Buchanan; Mayfly; Julianna Sazia	
John Byrne	Wonder Woman vol. 2 (writer/artist) #101–136, Annual #5-6 (1995-1998)	Wonder Girl (Cassie Sandsmark); Helena Sandsmark; Mike Schorr; Dark Angel	
Eric Luke	Wonder Woman vol. 2 #139-159, Annual #7 (1998-2000)	Devastation	
Phil Jimenez	Wonder Woman vol. 2 #164-188 (2001–2003); Wonder Woman: Donna Troy #1 (1998); Wonder Woman Secret Files and Origins #2-3 (1999-2002) (writer/artist/cover art; among other artists); Wonder Woman: Our Worlds at War #1 (writer only) (2001); Wonder Woman Historia: The Amazons #1 (artist only) (2022)	Trevor & Bobby Barnes; Cyborgirl	
Greg Rucka	Wonder Woman: The Hiketeia (graphic novel with J.G. Jones, June 2002, hc, 94 pages, 2002, ISBN 1-56389-898-5); Wonder Woman vol. 2 #195-226 (August 2003-February 2006); Down to Earth (tpb, 160 pages, 2004, ISBN 1-4012-0226-8) collects: "The Mission" (with Drew Johnson, in #195, 2003); "Down to Earth" (with Drew Johnson, in #196-200, 2003-2004); "Stoned" (with Linda Medley, in #200, 2004); "Media Coverage of Reflections" (with Eric Shanower, in #200, 2004); Bitter Rivals (tpb, 128 pages, 2005, ISBN 1-4012-0462-7) collects: "Ripples" (with Shane Davis, in #201, 2004); "Leaks" (with Stephen Sadowski, in #202, 2004); "Bitter Pills" (with Drew Johnson, in 203-205, 2004); Eyes of the Gorgon (tpb, 192 pages, 2005, ISBN 1-4012-0797-9) collects: "Stoned" (with Drew Johnson, in #206-210, 2004); "To The Victors, The Spoils" (with Sean Phillips, in #211, 2004); "Counting Coup" (with James Raiz, in #212-213, 2005); Land of the Dead (tpb, 128 pages, 2006, ISBN 1-4012-0938-6) collects: "Truth or Dare" (with Drew Johnson, Geoff Johns and Justiniano, in #214 and The Flash vol. 2 #219, 2005); "The Bronze Doors" (with Rags Morales, in #215-217, 2005); Mission's End (tpb, 208 pages, 2006, ISBN 1-4012-1093-7) collects: "The Calm" (with Ron Randall, in #218, 2005); "Sacrifice" (with Tom Derenick, Georges Jeanty, Karl Kerschl, David López, and Rags Morales, in #219, 2005); "Affirmative Defense" (with David Lopez, in #220, 2005); "Pride of the Amazons" (with Rags Morales and Cliff Richards, in #221, 2005); "Blood Debt" (with Cliff Richards, in #222, 2005); "Marathon" (with Cliff Richards and Rags Morales, in #223-224, 2005); "Nothing Finished, Only Abandoned" (with Cliff Richards, in #225, 2006); "Cover Date" (with Cliff Richards, in #226, 2006); Wonder Woman vol. 5 #1-25 (with Liam Sharp, 2016-2017)	Veronica Cale; Io; Ferdinand; Adrianna Anderson/Doctor Cyber; Marina Maru/Colonel Poison	
Allan Heinberg	Wonder Woman vol. 4 #1-4, Annual #1 (2006-2007)		
Gail Simone	Wonder Woman vol. 3, #14-44, 600 (2007-2010)	Warkiller; Alkyone; Genocide	Longest-running female writer for Wonder Woman.
J. Michael Straczynski	Wonder Woman vol. 1 #600-604 (2010-2011)		
Phil Hester	Wonder Woman vol. 1 #605-614 (2011)		
Brian Azzarello	Wonder Woman vol. 4 #0-35 (2011-2014)		
Meredith Finch	Wonder Woman vol. 4 #36-52 (2015-2016)	Derinoe	
Shea Fontana	Wonder Woman vol. 5 #26-30 (2017)		
James Robinson	Wonder Woman vol. 5 #31-50 (2017-2018)	Jason	
Steve Orlando	Wonder Woman vol. 5 #51-55, Annual #3-4; Wonder Woman vol. 1 #750-758		
G. Willow Wilson	Wonder Woman vol. 5 #58-81 (2018-2019)	Atlantiades	
Mariko Tamaki	Wonder Woman vol. 1 #759-769 (2020)	Liar Liar	
Becky Cloonan & Michael W. Conrad	Wonder Woman vol. 1 #770-800 (2021-2023)	Siegfried; Ratatoskr; Altuum the Survivor; Janus	
Joëlle Jones	Future State: Wonder Woman #1-2 (2021); Wonder Girl (vol. 3) #1-7 (2021-2022); Trial of the Amazons #1-2 (2022); Trial of the Amazons: Wonder Girl #1-2 (2022)	Yara Flor	
Kelly Sue DeConnick	Wonder Woman Historia: The Amazons #1-3 (2022-2023)		
Tom King	Wonder Woman #1-Current (2024- )	The Sovereign	
Kelly Thompson	Absolute Wonder Woman #1-Current (2024- )	Absolute Wonder Woman	

=== Artists ===
Name/tenure	Notable stories/titles	Notable characters (co-) created by	Notes
Trina Robbins (1986)	The Legend of Wonder Woman (1986)		First woman to draw Wonder Woman.
Jill Thompson	Wonder Woman vol. 2 #45-48, 50-51, 53-55, 57-59, 61-64, Special #1 (1990–1992)		
Liam Sharp	DC Rebirth		
Matthew Clark	DC Rebirth		
Nicola Scott	DC Rebirth		
Ande Parks			
Romeo Tanghal	Wonder Woman #287-290 (1982); Wonder Woman vol. 2 #41-48, 50-51, 53-59, 62-63, 70-71, 89, 137-138, Annual #7 (1990-1998)		
Tom Grummett	Wonder Woman vol. 2 #32		
Joëlle Jones	Future State: Wonder Woman #1-2 (2021); Wonder Girl (vol. 3) #1-4 (2021); Trial of the Amazons #1-2 (2022); Trial of the Amazons: Wonder Girl #1-2 (2022)	Yara Flor	

== See also ==
- Wonder Woman
- List of Batman creators
- List of Superman creators
- List of Green Lantern creators
