= List of Superman creators =

Jerry Siegel and Joe Shuster are credited as the co-creators of Superman. This article distinguishes the original creators of the character from the many writers, artists and other contributors who have expanded the Superman mythos across comics, television and other media.

== Creators of Superman ==
- Jerry Siegel — Co-creator and writer. Siegel is credited as co-creator of Superman and contributed to the creation and early development of many supporting characters and elements associated with Superman, including Jor-El and Lara Lor-Van, Lois Lane, George Taylor, Ultra-Humanite, Lex Luthor, Perry White, Jimmy Olsen, Jonathan and Martha Kent, Superboy, the Prankster, Mister Mxyzptlk (and later Ms. Gsptlsnz), Brainiac 5, Lena Luthor and several members of the Legion of Super-Heroes and the Legion of Super-Pets, among others.
- Joe Shuster — Co-creator and artist. Shuster co-created and visually defined Superman and was instrumental in the early visual development of supporting characters, including Lois Lane, Lex Luthor, Perry White, Jimmy Olsen, Jonathan and Martha Kent, Jor-El, Lara Lor-Van, Superboy, Mister Mxyzptlk and George Taylor, among others.

== Notable contributors ==
The following lists include writers and artists who have made influential creative contributions to Superman comics and related media. Inclusion reflects prominence in storytelling, character creation, or notable creative runs; it is not an exhaustive list of every contributor.

=== Writers and artists ===
The following creators have both written and drawn Superman comics or produced notable creator-owned or editorially significant work on Superman titles.

Name/tenure	Notable stories/titles	Notable characters created	Notes
Jack Kirby (1970–1986)	Fourth World, Superman's Pal Jimmy Olsen, Super Powers, DC Comics Presents	Atlas, Bruno Mannheim, Dan Turpin, Darkseid, DeSaad, Dubbilex, Forever People, Guardian, Glorious Godfrey, Granny Goodness, Mad Harriet, Morgan Edge, Newsboy Legion, New Gods	Created or popularized Intergang, Galaxy Broadcasting System and Project Cadmus. Previously co-created and drew Guardian and the Newsboy Legion in Star-Spangled Comics (1942–1946); later succeeded by Curt Swan.
Keith Giffen (1982–1989)	Action Comics, DC Comics Presents, Legion of Super-Heroes (Vol. 3 & 4), L.E.G.I.O.N., Justice League International	Ambush Bug, Laurel Gand, Lobo, Maxwell Lord	Known for distinctive humour and reinventions in 1980s–90s DC editorial lines.
John Byrne (1986–1988)	The Man of Steel (reboot)	Bloodsport, Maggie Sawyer, Silver Banshee	Redesigned Superman's status quo in the mid-1980s post-Crisis continuity.
Jerry Ordway (1986–1993)	The Death of Superman story cycle (creative role)	Bibbo Bibbowski, Cat Grant, Gangbuster, Professor Hamilton, Ron Troupe	Writer/artist on titles connected to major 1990s storylines.
Dan Jurgens (1991–present)	The Death of Superman, related story arcs	Booster Gold, Conduit, Doomsday, Hank Henshaw (Cyborg Superman)	Central figure in 1990s Superman events and creator of Doomsday.

=== Writers only ===
The following writers made significant textual contributions to Superman stories and, in many cases, created enduring characters or situations.

Name/tenure	Notable stories/titles	Notable characters created	Notes
Cary Bates (1965–1986)	Bronze Age Superman titles, The New Adventures of Superboy	Captain Strong, Faora, Steve Lombard, Terra-Man, Tyroc, Vartox, Vril Dox	Wrote the first Supergirl series (1972) and significant Legion-related stories.
Robert Bernstein	"The Oldest Man in Metropolis" and other stories	General Zod, Lar Gand/Mon-El, Sam Lane	Co-created the Phantom Zone concept.
Otto Binder	"The Supergirl from Krypton", "The Super Duel on Space", "The Boy of Steel vs the Thing of Steel", "The Man Who Destroyed Krypton" and numerous stories	Alura, Beppo, Bizarro, Black Zero, Brainiac, Kara Zor-El (Supergirl), Jax-Ur, Krypto, Zor-El, Lucy Lane, Metallo, Professor Potter, Titano	Co-created Kandor, and many Silver Age elements.
Bill Finger	"The Origin of Superman!" (1948), "The Girl in Superboy's Life!", World's Finest Comics	Lana Lang, Lori Lemaris	Also noted for co-creating Batman; wrote numerous Superman/Batman team-ups.
Geoff Johns	Superman: Up, Up and Away!, Superman: Secret Origin, Superman: New Krypton	Lor-Zod/Chris Kent, Thara Ak-Var	Also contributed to television adaptations and revitalizations.
Elliot S. Maggin	"Must There Be a Superman?", "The Luthor Nobody Knows", "Who took the Super out of Superman?", "The Einstein Connection", Superman: Last Son of Krypton, Superman: Miracle Monday	C.W. Saturn, Superwoman (Kristin Wells), Superboy Prime	Explored more of Lex Luthor's psyche, introduced LexCorp and other notable elements into the comics.
Gardner Fox	Justice Society and Justice League related work	Ultraman	Prolific Golden Age and Silver Age scripter.
Darwyn Cooke	Superman: Kryptonite		
Karl Kesel	Various Superman titles	Conner Kent/Kon-El (Superboy)	Significant 1990s Superman-era contributions.
Jeph Loeb	Superman for All Seasons	—	Noted for influential limited series and collaborations with Tim Sale.
Alan Moore	For the Man who Has Everything, Whatever Happened to the Man of Tomorrow?	—	Celebrated for an acclaimed out-of-continuity final tale for Silver Age Superman.
Grant Morrison	All-Star Superman	Kal Kent (future Superman)	Renowned for reinvention and iconic limited series.
George Pérez	Various projects	Police Commissioner David Corporon	Renowned artist and occasional writer on DC team books.
James Robinson	Various runs and limited series	Thara Ak-Var	Notable for legacy and character-focused storytelling.
Louise Simonson	Various titles	Conduit	Important 1980s–90s writer with editorial influence on Superman-related titles.
Roger Stern	Notable 1980s runs	Blaze and Satanus	Contributed to Bronze Age continuity.
Mark Waid	Kingdom Come, Superman: Birthright	—	Known for modern re-interpretations and expansive Elseworlds work.
Marv Wolfman	Various runs	Bibbo Bibbowski, Cat Grant	Introduced enduring supporting characters.

=== Artists only ===
Artists who have contributed primarily through visual storytelling and design.

Name/tenure	Notable stories/titles	Notable characters created	Notes
Brett Breeding	Various Superman titles	Blaze and Satanus	Inker and penciller on multiple Superman projects.
Tom Grummett	Superboy, Superman related titles	Kon-El/Conner Kent (Superboy), Ron Troupe	Artist on 1990s–2000s Superman-era titles.
Jesús Merino	Superman (various modern runs)	—	Spanish artist noted for contemporary DC work.
Jim Mooney	Various Silver/Bronze Age works	—	Contributor across DC line during mid-20th century.
George Papp	Golden Age and subsequent titles	Pete Ross, General Zod	Co-created or early-illustrated several supporting characters.
Al Plastino	Various Golden/Silver Age Superman comics	Kara Zor-El (Supergirl)	Co-creator of Kandor location; significant Silver Age artist.
John Sikela	Various contributions	Lana Lang	Artist with Silver/Bronze Age credits.
Curt Swan	Longtime definitive Superman artist	—	Principal Superman artist for decades; defined the character's mid-century look.

=== Other notable contributors ===
Creators and media contributors who influenced Superman in television, film and other media.

Name/tenure	Notable stories/titles	Notable characters created	Notes
Alfred Gough	Smallville (2001–2011)	Lionel Luthor, Chloe Sullivan	Co-creator and showrunner of the television series Smallville.
Miles Millar	Smallville (2001–2011)	Lionel Luthor, Chloe Sullivan	Co-creator and showrunner of the television series Smallville.

== See also ==
- List of Batman creators
- List of Wonder Woman creators
- List of Green Lantern creators
