= Hypnota =

- Hypnota/Hypnotic Woman in Suicide Squad (volume 7) #4, June 2021; illustration by Eduardo Pansica, inks by Julio Ferreira and colors by Marcelo Maiolo.

Publication information
- Publisher: DC Comics
- First appearance: Wonder Woman #11 (Winter 1944)
- Created by: William Moulton Marston; Harry G. Peter

In-story information
- Species: Human
- Team affiliations: Villainy Inc.
- Notable aliases: Hypnota the Great; The Hypnotic Woman
- Abilities: Mind control via hypnosis

Hypnota (also sometimes Hypnotic Woman) is a fictional character appearing in DC Comics publications and related media, commonly as a recurring adversary of the superhero Wonder Woman. Created by writer William Moulton Marston and artist Harry G. Peter, the character debuted in 1944 in Wonder Woman #11 as a stage magician and human trafficker with powerful superhuman mind-control abilities. The gender presentation of her stage persona, Hypnota the Great, was that of an ostensibly male figure in Orientalized Middle-Eastern costume, complete with a false mustache and goatee. Though initially disguising her gender to deflect criminal suspicion (a genderplay trope Marston incorporated into several other foes he created to battle Wonder Woman, including Doctor Poison and the Blue Snowman), Hypnota made subsequent Golden Age appearances in her masculine stage garb; even after her supposedly "true" gender identity was revealed, she chose to present as a man – a move that might be understood in the 21st century as genderqueer. The Modern Age Hypnota has abandoned her false facial hair and is now depicted as a cisgender woman, albeit one who wears a masculine costume similar to her Golden Age look.

== Fictional character biography ==
=== Pre-Crisis ===
The Golden Age Hypnota grapples with Wonder Woman on the cover of Wonder Woman #11 (Winter 1944/1945); art by Harry G. Peter.

Hypnota is a stage magician who conceals her gender via masculine costume and false facial hair. After her twin sister and assistant Serva accidentally shoots her in the head during an act, Hypnota undergoes experimental surgery to save her life and gains the ability to hypnotize others.

Hypnota uses this new talent both in her stage act and in crime, including the selling of her mesmerized victims to slave merchants from the planet Saturn. Hypnota hypnotizes her Serva into becoming her partner in crime. When Saturn's slave trade in Earthlings is banned as part of a peace treaty with Earth, Hypnota, hoping to revitalize her source of revenue, steals America's contingency defense plans against Saturn to foment hostility and break the treaty. Her warmongering efforts attract the attention of Wonder Woman. Hypnota battles Wonder Woman with the unwilling aid of her twin sister Serva. Hypnota hypnotizes Wonder Woman, making her publicly humiliate herself and help her in her crimes and warmongering. Finally Wonder Woman breaks free of Hypnota's control and frees Serva from hypnosis, stopping Hypnota with the aid of a mirror that causes Hypnota to hypnotize herself.

Hypnota, like many of Wonder Woman's enemies, is sentenced to prison on the Amazon penal colony Transformation Island. She, Blue Snowman, and six other super-villains later escape and pool their talents as Villainy Inc. Led by the Saturnian slaver Eviless, they become the evil eight. Hypnota rehypnotizes Wonder Woman temporarily during a fight with her, but her control is broken once again. The evil eight are again defeated by Wonder Woman. Whether or not Hypnota's masculine garb, which concealed her true gender throughout most of her first appearance and which she retained in her second appearance, is to be taken as anything more than a stage affectation is unclear.

=== Post-Crisis ===
In the Post-Crisis, Hypnota is referred to as "the Hypnotic Woman".

=== Future State ===
Hypnota, now calling herself again the Hypnotic Woman is a member of Amanda Waller's Justice Squad, using her powers of illusionism to disguise herself as Wonder Woman.

=== DC Rebirth ===
After the events of DC Rebirth, Hypnota was briefly seen in a jailbreak with other members of the Suicide Squad from the Future State universe.

== Powers and abilities ==
Hypnota has the ability to project "blue hypnotic rays" from her eyes or hands, which can control the minds of anyone who fell under their influence. She has expertise in escapology and prestidigitation.

== Other versions ==
=== Wonder Woman: Black and Gold ===
Hypnota appears in the anthology series Wonder Woman: Black & Gold. In the story "Love Failed" by Andrew MacLean, Hypnota is depicted as an elderly illusionist who forms a self-help cult known as the Guiding Light. After Wonder Woman's friend Theresa is inducted into the cult, she confronts Hypnota on the psychic plane. The battle results in Wonder Woman stripping Hypnota of her power and leaving her in her chamber.

== See also ==
- List of Wonder Woman enemies
