= Villainy Inc. =

Fictional villain group in Wonder Woman comics

- Top: Jinx, Giganta, Trinity. Bottom: Cyborgirl, Doctor Poison, Queen Clea.

Publication information
- Publisher: DC Comics
- First appearance: Wonder Woman #28 (March–April 1948)
- Created by: William Moulton Marston; Harry G. Peter

In-story information
- Member(s): Golden Age Eviless (leader) Blue Snowman Cheetah Doctor Poison Giganta Hypnota Queen Clea Zara; Modern Age Queen Clea (leader) Cyborgirl Doctor Poison Giganta Jinx Trinity; Rebirth Doctor Psycho (leader) Doctor Poison Duke of Deception Hera Professor Calculus Sweetheart

Villainy Inc. is a team of fictional characters appearing in DC Comics publications and related media, commonly as an alliance of recurring adversaries of the superhero Wonder Woman. The group debuted in 1948's Wonder Woman #28, though each of its eight initial members had previously appeared as antagonists in earlier Wonder Woman adventures. Historically, Wonder Woman #28 holds a distinction as the final issue of the series to be written by the heroine’s creator William Moulton Marston before his death.

Three different incarnations of Villainy Inc. have appeared in DC Comics publications: (1) the Golden Age version, led by Eviless, (2) the Modern Age version, led by Queen Clea, and (3) the Rebirth-era version, led by Doctor Psycho and masterminded by Hera. Of these, the Golden and Modern Age incarnations consisted exclusively of women characters, although three Golden Age figures among them – Blue Snowman, Doctor Poison and Hypnota – would likely be construed by 21st century readers as gender non-conforming. Since 2021, Blue Snowman has been specifically presented by writers as a genderfluid character.

The team was adapted for the 2019 Warner Brothers animated film Wonder Woman: Bloodlines, in which it was led by Doctor Cyber and masterminded by Veronica Cale.

== Publication history ==
=== Golden Age ===
Villainy Inc. debuted in Wonder Woman #28, in the last story written by series creator William Moulton Marston. The villains, who were individually sentenced to and later escaped from a prison on the Amazon penal colony Transformation Island, teamed up to take down their common enemies, who are led by the Saturnine slaver Eviless, who tricked the Amazons into believing she had lost her evil nature and stole Wonder Woman's lasso. Eviless faked her death and tried to release the prisoners on Transformation Island, most of whom refused but some agreed with Eviless and joined her. Eviless captured Hippolyta using the lasso, Blue Snowman, Poison, and Hypnota luring her into a trap. Hippolyta was then taken from the island. Later, the villains captured Wonder Woman and took her away in a boat but Wonder Woman drags the boat underwater and saves Eviless, who cannot swim. Clea tried to buy a submarine from Steve Trevor to return to Atlantis but Trevor recognized Clea and captured her. Giganta knocked out Trevor, and Clea and her aide decided to capture the Holliday Girls and Wonder Woman to force him to give them a submarine. They imprison the Holliday Girls in Professor Zool's lab and Giganta attacks Wonder Woman but is overpowered. This partially worked and they forced Wonder Woman to steal a US Navy submarine for them but Clea and Giganta were recaptured before their sub could fully submerge. The escapees were returned to Transformation Island by Wonder Woman and the Amazons.

=== Modern Age ===
Following the retcons in Crisis on Infinite Earths, the group's history begins when they menace Hippolyta in the Golden Age. Cheetah, Zara, Doctor Poison and Hypnotic Woman (formerly Hypnota) were assembled by Queen Clea. The Atlantean monarch of the city Venturia enlists the others to defeat her rival city Aurania. They are repeatedly foiled by Hippolyta. Later, Hippolyta's daughter Diana travels back in time and discovers them in battle. Clea is defeated by Diana, who disguises herself as Miss America, and Clea's daughter Ptra.

In recent times, when all of Atlantis disappears from the Earth, Clea again sets out to assemble a new Villainy, Inc. and conquer a land to rule. Together they descend upon the other-dimensional land of Skartaris. Clea uses Cyborgirl to take control of the entire dimension. Clea's plan, however, is commandeered by Trinity, who is revealed to be a virus that was engineered by the founders of Skartaris. When the "Trinity Virus" is reintroduced into Skartaris' governing computer system, it begins to regress and devolve to its origins. Wonder Woman stops the process from becoming permanent but some of Skartaris' inhabitants, including Clea, are lost in the de-evolution.

== Members ==
=== Golden Age ===
Member	First appearance	Description
Blue Snowman	Sensation Comics #59 (November 1946)	Byrna Brilyant is a small town school-teacher and scientist who disguises herself as a man called "The Snowman" and uses "blue snow", a substance invented by her late father, that freezes everything it touches. She later takes the name Blue Snowman when she joins Villainy Inc. In the Post-Crisis universe, Blue Snowman was never part of the original Villainy Inc.
Cheetah	Wonder Woman #6 (October 1943)	Priscilla Rich is a socialite whose feelings of inferiority periodically cause her Cheetah persona to seize control of her personality.
Doctor Poison	Sensation Comics #2 (February 1942)	Princess Maru is a leader of a Nazi spy ring, whose ultimate goal is to wreak havoc on the US Army by contaminating the army's water supply with "reverso", a drug that "confuses the brain centers ... [making] soldiers do the exact opposite of what they are told".
Eviless	Wonder Woman #10 (Fall 1944)	A slave driver from Saturn who is sent to Transformation Island for rehabilitation after her initial encounter with Wonder Woman. Eviless later forms the first incarnation of Villainy Inc. in Wonder Woman #28, the last story by Wonder Woman creator William Moulton Marston, but never appears again in any continuity, though she may have inspired the Silver Age hero Saturn Girl and Saturn Queen.
Giganta	Wonder Woman #9 (Summer 1944)	A female gorilla who is artificially evolved into a human strongwoman by Professor Zool. In the Post-Crisis universe, Giganta was never part of the original Villainy Inc.
Hypnota	Wonder Woman #11 (Winter 1944)	A stage magician who conceals her gender using masculine dress and false facial hair. Hypnota is accidentally shot in the head during a rehearsal. Experimental surgery saves her life but also releases a "blue electric ray of dominance" from her "mid-brain", granting her the ability to mesmerize and control the minds of others by projecting "blue hypnotic rays" from her eyes and hands. Using this new power for crime, she enslaves her sister, the weak-willed Serva, and uses her as a pawn while selling hypnotized captives to the Saturn slave traders. In the Post-Crisis universe, she is known as Hypnotic Woman.
Queen Clea	Wonder Woman #8 (March 1944)	The cruel ruler of the Atlantean colony Venturia, a subsea realm situated beneath the bottom of the Atlantic Ocean, until she is deposed by Wonder Woman.
Zara	Comics Cavalcade #5 (Winter 1943)	The self-proclaimed Priestess of the Crimson Flame. Her past is unknown but she claims to be "an Arab girl" and wears belly dancer attire. According to her tales, she is sold into slavery as a child, creating in her an intense hatred of mankind. Using a flair for pyrotechnics, she creates a new religion called the Cult of The Crimson Flame. Zara rigs up fire-based effects to dazzle her followers and keep them in her thrall. After her initial defeat by Wonder Woman, the Cult goes underground but Zara was able to scare at least one follower to do her bidding when she joins Villainy Inc.

=== Modern Age ===
Member	First appearance	Description
Cyborgirl	Wonder Woman (vol. 2) #179 (May 2002)	LeTonya Charles is the niece of Dr. Sarah Charles, who requires emergency surgery after a reaction to the "super-steroid" Tar. Her cybernetic implants give her all the same abilities as Victor Stone (Cyborg) but she has none of his sense of responsibility.
Doctor Poison	Wonder Woman (vol. 2) #151 (December 1999)	The granddaughter of the original Doctor Poison who continues her grandmother's grudge against Wonder Woman, though she holds her grandmother in contempt.
Giganta	Wonder Woman (vol. 2) #126 (October 1997)	Doris Zuel is a scientist whose mind is transferred into the body of an ape and later into the body of a circus strongwoman. She has the ability to grow in size and is now a modern-age villain and did not exist in the Golden Age.
Jinx	Tales of the Teen Titans #56 (August 1985)	An elemental sorceress whose powers include the ability to command elements such as air, the manipulation of magical energy she can manifest as offensive force bolts and green flame, as well as the ability to dissolve matter and create earthquakes.
Queen Clea	Wonder Woman: Our Worlds at War (September 2001)	The cruel ruler of the Atlantean colony of Venturia, a subsea realm situated beneath the Atlantic Ocean, until she is deposed by Wonder Woman. In the Post-Crisis universe, she is the leader of the original Villainy Inc. instead of Eviless. She is also responsible for assembling the second Villainy Inc.
Trinity	The New Titans Annual #6 (1990)	A woman with three faces which are Time, War, and Chaos, each of which possesses its own power.

=== Post-Rebirth Era ===
Member	First appearance	Description
Doctor Psycho	Wonder Woman (vol. 2) #54 (May 1991)	Dr. Edgar Cizko is a powerful telepath and telekinetic who poses as a reformed supervillain-turned-pop-psychologist and "men's rights" advocate. A disturbed figure who revels in misogyny, manipulation and violence, Cizko assembles the post-Rebirth incarnation of Villainy Inc. at the behest of the vengeful Olympian goddess Hera.
Doctor Poison	Wonder Woman (vol. 5) #13 (February 2017)	Colonel Marina Maru is an expert on toxins and pathogens and the leader of an elite team of mercenaries known as "Poison". She has served as a security specialist and chief field operative of the criminal tycoon Veronica Cale.
Duke of Deception	Wonder Woman (vol. 3) #4 (February 2007)	Dolos is the Roman mythological deity of trickery and lies. He is a master of deceit and a powerful warrior with the ability to cast illusions. In Hera's thrall through undisclosed means, he is "gifted" like an object to Villainy Inc. by the goddess, arriving at Dr. Psycho's base of operations boxed in a wooden coffin.
Hera	Wonder Woman (vol. 4) #1 (November 2011)	The unpredictable queen of the Olympian Gods and the bitter wife of Wonder Woman's apparent father Zeus, Hera is an enormously powerful deity with a vindictive resentment of Wonder Woman and the Amazons. Aided by her grandsons Deimos and Phobos, she serves as Villainy Inc.'s silent benefactor, referred to blithely by Dr. Psycho as "Management".
Professor Calculus	Wonder Woman #787 (July 2022)	A disgraced mathematics professor dismissed from Etta Candy's undergraduate alma mater Holliday College, Professor Calculus is a brilliant, disheveled master of data and statistics. He uses an invention called the Probability Engine to predict future outcomes with perfect accuracy, and serves as Villainy Inc.'s chief strategist. This character has an eponymous Golden Age antecedent, an affable ally to Wonder Woman, first appearing in Comic Cavalcade #29, October–November 1948.
Sweetheart	Wonder Woman #784 (April 2022)	Sweetheart is a fractured but powerful duplicate of Wonder Woman created by the Image-Maker, the despotic ruler of the extradimensional Mirror World. Abused by Dr. Psycho, who bestowed her with her demeaning name and cowed her into a servile role attired as a 1950s housewife, Sweetheart ultimately rebelled against her abusuer, sacrificing herself to help Wonder Woman defeat Villainy Inc.

== In other media ==
Villainy Inc. appears in Wonder Woman: Bloodlines, founded and secretly backed by Veronica Cale, who has Doctor Cyber and Doctor Poison serving as figureheads and Giganta, Cheetah, and Silver Swan as enforcers. This version of the group is a criminal organization that employs henchmen and uses enhancement drugs made by Poison to strengthen themselves. They seek to revive and weaponize Medusa to invade Themyscira and steal the Amazons' technological artifacts for profit. However, Medusa betrays them, destroying Cyber and killing Poison before using the latter's drug to become bigger and stronger and go on a rampage until Silver Swan helps Wonder Woman defeat the monster.

== See also ==
- List of Wonder Woman enemies
