= Godwatch =

Group of supervillains appearing in DC Comics

Publication information
- Publisher: DC Comics
- First appearance: Wonder Woman (vol. 5) #5 (October 2016)
- Created by: Greg Rucka; Liam Sharp

In-story information
- Member(s): Veronica Cale; Anglette; Blue Snowman; Cheetah; Doctor Cyber; Doctor Poison; Phobos and Deimos; Zara

Godwatch is a group of supervillains appearing in comic books published by DC Comics. The group consists of several of Wonder Woman's major enemies.

== Fictional team history ==
Founded by Veronica Cale, the purpose of Godwatch was to discover the location of Themyscira. The gods Deimos and Phobos had taken the soul of Cale's daughter, Isadore, and used her as ransom against Cale. They planned to find Themyscira to free their father, Ares, from his imprisonment by the Amazons.

Cale recruited her best friend Adrianna Anderson, who died and became the cybernetic creature known as Doctor Cyber while aiding her friend against Wonder Woman. Cale also utilized her personal bodyguard Colonel Marina Maru and her agents from Team Poison, a group of female mercenaries. Cheetah was at one time a member of Godwatch, as she despised Wonder Woman for allowing her to become a monster. Unbeknownst to her, Godwatch was actually partially responsible for Minerva's transformation into the Cheetah.

Deimos and Phobos grew impatient with Cale, which led to several threats by the twins. Cale, fearful that the gods wouldn't return her daughter to her, sought out the aid of Circe, who transformed the twins into dogs. As dogs, Deimos and Phobos were forced into loyalty to Cale.

Veronica Cale then captured Cheetah and forced her to help Godwatch locate Themyscira. Cale was reunited with her daughter, though Ares revealed that Isadore's body and mind would split again if they left his prison. Isadore decided to stay with the Amazons on Themyscira, leaving Cale bitter and resentful. Cale distanced herself from Doctor Cyber and Colonel Maru while being investigated by the FBI.

Some time later, Veronica Cale recruited Zara of the Crimson Flame, Blue Snowman, and Anglette into her services, equipping them with stolen technology. Each of the three criminals battled Wonder Woman individually, though with each battle resulting in the villain's defeat.

Doctor Cyber soon returned to Veronica Cale's services, and offered to help her former best friend capture the Cheetah for revenge against her earlier attacks. Godwatch succeeded in apprehending Cheetah, and Doctor Poison attempted to experiment on her. However, Cheetah broke free from her captivity and attempted to kill Cale, though Wonder Woman's intervention allowed Cale to escape.

== Members ==
Member	First appearance	Description
Anglette	Wonder Woman (vol. 5) #41 (April 2018)	An unnamed athlete who was given the original Angle Man's weapon, the Angler.
Blue Snowman	Superman/Wonder Woman #4 (March 2014)	Byrna Brilyant is a young woman who was equipped with an Exo-Mecha suit that she was able to control with her mind.
Cheetah	Justice League (vol. 2) #10 (August 2012)	Barbara Ann Minerva was an archeologist who was transformed into the Cheetah after an expedition. Because of her hatred for her former best friend, Cheetah temporarily joined Godwatch and assisted the group in causing trouble for Wonder Woman.
Doctor Cyber	Wonder Woman (vol. 5) #5 (October 2016)	Adrianna Anderson was an esteemed scientist and best friend to Veronica Cale. After Cale's daughter was taken by Deimos and Phobos, Adrianna agreed to help by using her experimental Cyberwalker suit to battle Wonder Woman. Adrianna was killed during the battle, though her computerized mind was revived by Cale. She took the name Doctor Cyber and considered herself a "digital goddess".
Doctor Poison	Wonder Woman (vol. 5) #13 (February 2017)	Colonel Marina Maru is an expert in toxins and poisons. Along with her band of female mercenaries, Team Poison, Colonel Poison has been hired as Veronica Cale's personal agents.
Zara	Wonder Woman (vol. 5) #41 (April 2018)	Zara of the Crimson Flame is a mysterious woman who had been given pyrokinetic abilities from Veronica Cale.
Veronica Cale	Wonder Woman (vol. 5) #9 (December 2016)	Veronica Cale is the founder of Godwatch. She formed the group after her daughter was held ransom by the gods Deimos and Phobos in order for them to discover the location of Themyscira.

== See also ==
- List of Wonder Woman enemies
