= Blue Snowman =

- The Blue Snowman in Sensational Wonder Woman Special #1 (2022); illustration by Paul Pelletier, inks by Norm Rapmund, colors by Adriano Lucas.

Publication information
- Publisher: DC Comics
- First appearance: Sensation Comics #59 (November 1946)
- Created by: William Moulton Marston, Harry G. Peter

In-story information
- Alter ego: Byrna Brilyant
- Team affiliations: Villainy Inc.; Godwatch; Ice Pack
- Abilities: Uses cryogenic weapons capable of generating extreme cold, ice and snow Exo-suit provides enhanced strength and invulnerability

The Blue Snowman is a fictional character appearing in DC Comics publications and related media, commonly as a recurring adversary of the superhero Wonder Woman. Created by writer William Moulton Marston and artist Harry G. Peter, the character debuted in 1946 in Sensation Comics #59 as a high-tech extortionist named Byrna Brilyant who used a fearsome costumed persona (known then only as the Snow Man) to coerce money out of innocent victims.

Brilyant's Golden Age gender identity was presented as that of a woman who disguised herself as an ostensibly male supervillain to deflect criminal suspicion – a genderplay trope Marston incorporated into several other foes he created to battle Wonder Woman, including Doctor Poison and Hypnota. The 2021 relaunch Infinite Frontier portrays the Modern Age Byrna Brilyant as genderfluid, their Blue Snowman stylings part of their flexible gender-presentation.

In her first appearance in 1946, Brilyant's alter ego dressed in a bulky blue robe, complete with jowlish blue head mask and blue derby. A later appearance in 1948 (in Wonder Woman #28) changed her name from the Snow Man to the Blue Snowman, keeping the head mask and hat, but replacing the robe with a bulbous metallic bodysuit, similar in silhouette to that of the advertising mascot the Michelin Man. The Golden Age Blue Snowman's primary weapon was a giant cannon which could fire a "snow ray" producing "blue snow," a form of precipitation freezing anything it touches. The Modern Age Blue Snowman not only continues to sport a derby, but also wears an advanced exo-suit of blue mecha-style armor fashioned to look like the round features of a children's snowman. This armor is outfitted with weaponry capable of firing a cryogenic blast that can freeze anything in its path, similar to the ice guns wielded by fellow DC Comics rogues Mr. Freeze and Captain Cold.

== Publication history ==
Blue Snowman first appeared in Sensation Comics #59 and was created by William Moulton Marston and H.G. Peter.

== Fictional character biography ==
=== Earth-Two version ===
Byrna Brilyant's scientist father died while working on his invention of "blue snow", a special form of precipitation that freezes everything it touches. This invention was intended to "serve humanity", although precisely how seems rather vague. Thinking to put her father's work to more profitable use, Byrna creates the masculine identity of the Snow Man and unleashes snow upon the farming community of Fair Weather Valley, demanding each farmer's "life savings" in return for the chemical antidote that will free crops, livestock, and people from the snow's effects. The Blue Snow Man is discovered in "his" mountain sanctuary by Wonder Woman, who forces "him" to defrost the valley.

Like many of Wonder Woman's enemies, Brilyant is sentenced to prison on the Amazon penal colony Transformation Island, but in 1948 she and seven female super-villains escape and pool their talents as Villainy Inc. Led by Eviless, the evil eight are again defeated by Wonder Woman. In this appearance, she calls herself the Blue Snow Man.

=== Post-Crisis ===
Blue Snowman does not appear for many years following the Crisis on Infinite Earths continuity reboot. Sometime later, she reappears and is killed by an alien bug that Vartox brought to Earth to impress Power Girl. In this version, Byrna uses a robotic suit of armor that generates ice. She was also mentioned as having worked with the Ice Pack, which did not exist in that continuity.

=== The New 52 ===
In 2011, "The New 52" rebooted the DC universe. Blue Snowman is first seen when appearing briefly after battling Wonder Woman and her ally Hessia alongside her robot minions.

=== DC Rebirth ===
In 2016, DC Comics implemented another relaunch of its books called DC Rebirth which restored its continuity to a form much as it was prior to "The New 52". Blue Snowman's origin is altered. At some point, Byrna Brilyant came into contact with Veronica Cale, who had equipped Brilyant with an Exo-Mecha suit. This suit enabled Brilyant to attack Washington D.C., with blue snow, though the suit was eventually destroyed by Wonder Woman which in turn rendered Brilyant comatose.

=== Infinite Frontier ===
In DC's 2021 relaunch known as Infinite Frontier, which made further alterations to the continuity, Blue Snowman makes an appearance, wearing the post-Crisis version of the suit, ambushing Wonder Woman and Steve Trevor during their Valentine's Day date. Having encased both Wonder Woman's and Steve Trevor's arms in blue ice, the villain went to finish Steve off, at which point Wonder Woman knocked off Snowman's helmet. Steve was surprised to discover that Blue Snowman was a woman, but Byrna corrected that assumption by coming out as genderfluid. Wonder Woman decided to let Byrna leave, hoping that this new insight will bring them peace.

Two days before Christmas, Harley Quinn tracks Blue Snowman down for help in curing Poison Ivy's mysterious viral infection. The two ultimately cure Blue Snowman with a magical staff after getting permission from Hawkman and inviting them to stay for Christmas.

== Powers and abilities ==
Blue Snowman possesses no superhuman powers, but has a genius-level intellect. They wield an exoskeletal armor and various ice-generating technology.

== Other versions ==
=== The Legend of Wonder Woman ===
Blue Snowman was set to appear in the second volume to The Legend of Wonder Woman, a retelling of Wonder Woman's origins by Renae de Liz and Ray Dillon. However, DC cancelled the project under unknown circumstances. De Liz later posted preliminary artwork featuring Blue Snowman on Twitter.

=== Sensational Wonder Woman ===
In the digital-first anthology series Sensational Wonder Woman, Blue Snowman first appears in the story "Ice Blue", where she receives funding from Veronica Cale to enhance her blue snow technology. Blue Snowman later appears in "The Queen's Hive", where she, Giganta, Dr. Poison, and Silver Swan serve as Queen Bee's generals. The Blue Snowman later attacks a city but is stopped by Wonder Woman with the help of Will, one of her young fans. After the fight Wonder Woman suggests that Byrna might find better self satisfaction and respect if she used her talents to help others instead of bullying them.

=== Tales from Earth-6 ===
Blue Snowman was re-imagined as "Frosteen" in this anthology special celebrating Stan Lee. In the story, Frosteen battled Maria Mendoza, the version of Wonder Woman that Lee created for DC's Just Imagine... line.

== In other media ==
=== Television ===
- Blue Snowman makes a non-speaking appearance in the Harley Quinn episode "Getting Ice Dick, Don't Wait Up" as a member of the "cold boys".
- Byrna Brilyant makes a non-speaking cameo appearance in the My Adventures with Superman episode "Most Eligible Superman".

=== Video games ===
Blue Snowman appears as a boss in Justice League: Cosmic Chaos, voiced by Vanessa Marshall.

=== Miscellaneous ===
- Blue Snowman appears in DC Super Friends #16 as a member of the Ice Pack.
- Blue Snowman appears in All-New Batman: The Brave and the Bold #4.

== See also ==
- List of Wonder Woman enemies
