= List of Batman creators =

Although Bob Kane achieved renown for creating the fictional superhero Batman, he and others have acknowledged the contributions of Bill Finger for fleshing the character out, writing many of his early stories, and creating the character's origin. Many other comic book creators (writers, artists, and sometimes editors who contributed important ideas or altered how the character would be presented) have contributed to the character's history since Batman's introduction in Detective Comics #27 in 1939. This list identifies some who made notable contributions with enduring impact.

== Creators of Batman ==
- Bob Kane — concept, creator and artist. Co-created several secondary characters including junior partner/protege Dick Grayson/Robin, Alfred Pennyworth (as Alfred Beagle), Jim Gordon, the Joker, Selina Kyle/Catwoman, the Penguin, Two-Face, Mr. Freeze (as Mr. Zero), Scarecrow, Basil Karlo/Clayface, Mad Hatter, Hugo Strange, Deadshot, Cavalier, The Monk, gangsters Sal Maroni, Tony Zucco, and Joe Chill, photographer Vicki Vale, Julie Madison, Bette Kane/Bat-Girl, Bat-Mite, Dick Grayson's parents Mary and John Grayson, and Bruce Wayne's parents Martha and Thomas Wayne.
- Bill Finger — co-creator and developer (uncredited from 1939 to 2015, credited 2016–present), also a writer. Also co-created several secondary characters including Dick Grayson/Robin, Alfred Pennyworth, Jim Gordon, the Joker, Selina Kyle/Catwoman, the Riddler, the Penguin, Two-Face, Scarecrow, Calendar Man, Basil Karlo/Clayface and Matt Hagen/Clayface, Mad Hatter, mad scientists Hugo Strange and Professor Achilles Milo, Killer Moth, gangsters Sal Maroni, Tony Zucco, and Joe Chill, Vicki Vale, Ace the Bat-Hound, Bat-Mite, Bette Kane/Bat-Girl, Thomas Blake/Catman, Dick Grayson's parents Mary and John Grayson, and Bruce Wayne's parents Martha and Thomas Wayne.

== Notable contributors ==
This is an incomplete list.

=== Writers & artists ===
The following list is of people who have both written and drawn Batman comics.

Name/tenure	Notable stories/titles	Notable characters (co-) created by	Notes
Frank Miller	Batman: The Dark Knight Returns (1986); Batman: Year One (1987); Batman: The Dark Knight Strikes Again (2001–2002); All Star Batman & Robin, the Boy Wonder (2005–2008); The Dark Knight III: The Master Race (2015–2017)	Gillian B. Loeb; Arnold Flass; Carmine Falcone; Holly Robinson; Carrie Kelley	He re-established Batman's origin during Crisis on Infinite Earths. He was also an artist on The Dark Knight Returns and The Dark Knight Strikes Again.
Frank Robbins		Man-Bat; Francine Langstrom/She-Bat	A primary writer for Batman and Detective Comics from 1968–1974, and artist on several of his own Batman stories in Detective Comics from 1971-1973.
Matt Wagner	Batman/Superman/Wonder Woman: Trinity (2003); Batman and the Monster Men (2006); Batman and the Mad Monk (2006–2007)		

=== Writers only ===
Name/tenure	Notable stories/titles	Notable characters (co-) created by	Notes
Mike W. Barr; 1974-2014	Batman #327, 329, 331, 334, 353, Annual #8-9, Special #1 (1980-1985); Batman and the Outsiders #1-32, Annual #1-2 (1983-1986); Batman: Year Two (1987); Batman: Son of the Demon (1987); Batman: Bride of the Demon (1991); Batman: Dark Knight Dynasty (1998); Batman: Full Circle #1 (1991); Batman: Gotham Knights #25 (Batman Black and White) (2002); Batman: In Darkest Knight #1 (1994); Batman: Legends of the Dark Knight #21-23 (1991); Batman: Two-Face Strikes Twice #1-2 (1993); Batman: Reign of Terror #1 (1999); Bruce Wayne: The Road Home: Outsiders #1 (2010); Beware the Batman #5 (2014)	Looker; Halo; Sondra Fuller/Lady Clay; Windfall; Geo-Force; Preston Payne/Clayface; Damian Wayne; Wrath; Katana; Reaper	Whilst he and Jerry Bingham originally created Damian Wayne, it was Grant Morrison and Andy Kubert who reinterpreted the character for more modern times.
Ed Brubaker 1998-	Detective Comics; Catwoman; Batman: Gotham Adventures (1998); Batman Gotham Noir (2001); Batman: Turning Points (2001); Bruce Wayne: Fugitive (2002); Gotham Central (2002–2005); Batman: The Man Who Laughs (2005)	Harlan Combs/Firebug; Crime Scene Unit officer Jim Corrigan (2000s version); Todd Russell/Clayface	Co-created the majority of the police officers and detectives featured in Gotham Central.
Donald Clough Cameron	"Here Comes Alfred!" - Batman #16 (April–May 1943)	Alfred Pennyworth (as Alfred Beagle); Tweedledum and Tweedledee; Cavalier	
Gerry Conway; 1980-1983	Batman; Detective Comics	Killer Croc; Jason Todd; Hamilton Hill; Black Spider (Eric Needham)	
Paul Dini 1997–present	Batman: Mr. Freeze (1997); Batman: Harley Quinn (1999); Batman: War On Crime (1999); No Man's Land (1999–2000); Batman: Detective (2007); Detective Comics #846-850: "Batman: Heart of Hush" (2009); Batman: Streets of Gotham: "Hush Money" (2009), "Leviathan" (2010), "The House of Hush" (2011); Batman: The Resurrection of Ra's al Ghul (2007)	Lock-Up; Victor Fries (Mr. Freeze); Nora Fries; Batman (Terry McGinnis); Peyton Riley/Ventriloquist; Harley Quinn	Whilst not writing comics till 2006, he did write for other Batman mediums before that time.; Created the update to Mr. Freeze's backstory.
Chuck Dixon	Birds of Prey; Detective Comics; Nightwing; Robin; Batman: Knightfall (1993–1994); Batman: Contagion (1996); Batman: GCPD (1996); Batman: Legacy (1996); Batman and Wildcat (1997); Batman: No Man's Land (1999–2000); Joker: Last Laugh (2001–2002)	General; Bane; Birds of Prey; Stephanie Brown; Lester Buchinsky/Electrocutioner; King Snake; Gearhead; Double Dare; Lady Vic; Owlman; Torque; Trigger Twins (Thomas and Thaddeus Trigger)	Co-created Nightwing's new home of Blüdhaven with Scott McDaniel.; Created or co-created some of Nightwing's rogues gallery.
Steve Englehart 1974-2006	Detective Comics #439 - "Night of the Stalker"; Batman: Strange Apparitions (1977–1978); Batman: Dark Detective; Batman: Dark Detective II	Rupert Thorne; Doctor Phosphorus; Silver St. Cloud	
Gardner Fox 1939-1968	Detective Comics	Martha Wayne; Thomas Wayne; Barbara Gordon/Batgirl; Julie Madison; Blockbuster; Cluemaster; Doctor Death; Monk; Owlman	Helped script Batman's origin story with Bob Kane, Bill Finger & Jerry Robinson.; The creator of the Batarang and co-creator of (proto-) Batplane with Sheldon Moldoff.
Neil Gaiman	Batman: Whatever Happened to the Caped Crusader? (2009)		
Alan Grant	Anarky; Batman/Judge Dredd: Judgment on Gotham (1991); Batman: The Last Arkham (1992–2000); Batman: Shadow of the Bat (1992); Batman: Knightfall (1993–1994); Batman: Anarky (1999)	Arnold Wesker/Ventriloquist; Otis Flannegan/Ratcatcher; Cornelius Stirk; Anarky; Victor Zsasz; Jeremiah Arkham; Harold Allnut; Amygdala	
Devin K. Grayson	Nightwing; Catwoman; Batman: Gotham Knights; No Man's Land (1993–1994)	Tarantula	
Robert Kanigher		Poison Ivy	
Tom King	Nightwing (volume 3) #30; Grayson; Robin War; Batman: Rebirth; Batman (volume 3)		
Jeph Loeb	Batman: The Long Halloween (1996–1997); Batman: Dark Victory (1999–2000); Batman: Hush (2002–2003); Batman/The Spirit (2007)	Hush; Alberto Falcone; Sofia Falcone	
Doug Moench	Batman: Prey (1990–1991); Batman & Dracula trilogy (1991–1998); Batman: Knightfall (1993–1994)	Bane; Black Mask; Black Spider (Johnny LaMonica); Cassius Payne/Clayface; Film Freak; Natalia Knight/Nocturna	
Grant Morrison	Arkham Asylum: A Serious House on Serious Earth (1989); Batman: Gothic (1990); Batman and Son (2006); Batman R.I.P. (2008); Batman and Robin (2009-2011); Batman: The Return of Bruce Wayne (2010); Batman Incorporated (2011-2013)	Damian Wayne; Azrael (Michael Lane); Amadeus Arkham; Prometheus; Professor Pyg	
Alan Moore	Batman: The Killing Joke (1988)		
Dennis O'Neil		League of Assassins; Ra's al Ghul; Talia al Ghul; Ubu; Azrael (Jean-Paul Valley); Lady Shiva; Leslie Thompkins; Maxie Zeus	As well as being a long-term writer, he was also an editor of the Batman titles, and is credited with 'rebooting' the Batman character.
David Vern Reed; 1950-1956, 1975	"Ride, Bat-Hombre, Ride"; "The Birth of Batplane II"; "The Joker's Millions"; "Two-Face Strikes Again"; "The Joker's Utility Belt"; "The Daily Death of Terry Tremayne"; "The Underworld Olympics '76!"; "Where Were You on the Night Batman Was Killed?"	Deadshot	
Greg Rucka	No Man's Land; Gotham Central	Crispus Allen; Jim Corrigan (2000's version); Nyssa Raatko	
Dan Slott	Arkham Asylum: Living Hell (2003)	Warren White/Great White Shark; Aaron Cash	
Scott Snyder	Detective Comics (volume 1) #871–881; Batman: Gates of Gotham #1–5; Batman (volume 2); Talon #0–7; Batman Eternal; Batman and Robin Eternal; Batman: Rebirth; All-Star Batman; Absolute Batman	Court of Owls; The Batman Who Laughs	Court of Owls was co-created with artist Greg Capullo.
Jim Starlin	Batman: Ten Nights of The Beast (1988); Batman: The Cult (1988); Batman: A Death in the Family (1988–1989)	KGBeast; Deacon Blackfire	
Peter Tomasi	Outsiders, vol. 3, #26-27, "Tick Tock" (with Will Conrad, July–August 2005); Nightwing, vol. 2, #140-153 (January 2008-February 2009); Batman and Robin, vol. 1, #20-22 (February–April 2011); Batman and Robin, vol. 2, #1-40, 23.1, Annual #1-2 (September 2011-March 2015); Batman, vol. 2, #23.4: Bane, "Dark Destiny" (with Graham Nolan, September 2013); Detective Comics, vol. 2, #23.3, 27, 45–46, 48-52; Batman/Superman, #31-32 (with Doug Mahnke, April–May 2016); Super Sons #1-16; Detective Comics, vol. 1, #994-1033, Annual 2-3		
James Tynion IV	Batman, vol. 2, #8-16, 18–25, 28, 35–39, 49, 52, 0; Talon #0-14; Batman Annual, vol. 2, #4; Red Hood and the Outlaws #19-28; Batman Eternal; Batman and Robin Eternal; Detective Comics #934-981, 1000, 1027, Annual #1; Batman, vol. 3, #86-117		
John Wagner		Ventriloquist (Arnold Wesker); Ratcatcher	
Len Wein		Lucius Fox; Anthony Lupus; Preston Payne/Clayface; Joe Rigger/Firebug	Was also editor-in-chief of DC Comics during Crisis on Infinite Earths.
Judd Winick	Batman: Under the Hood (2005–2006)	Jason Todd/Red Hood	Created Jasons Todd's Red Hood identity but not Jason Todd himself, created by Gerry Conway and Don Newton, or the Red Hood identity, created by Bill Finger.
Marv Wolfman		Tim Drake; Deathstroke; Arnold Etchison/Abattoir	
David Wood		Mr. Freeze (as Mr. Zero)	Worked as an uncredited "Ghost" writer during the Golden, Silver and Bronze Age.

=== Artists only ===
Name/tenure	Notable stories/titles	Notable characters (co-) created by	Notes
Neal Adams; 1968-2012	Batman (volume 1) #219, 232, 234, 237, 243–245, 251, 255 (1970–74); Brave and the Bold #79-86, 93 (1968–71); #102; Detective Comics #369; 395, 397, 400, 402, 404, 407, 408, 410 (1967–71); Batman Odyssey, #1-6 (2010–11); Batman Odyssey, vol. 2, #1-7 (2011–12); Covers only: Batman #200, 203, 217–218, 220–227, 229–231, 235–236, 238-241 (1968–72), Annual #14 (1990); Detective Comics #372, 385, 389, 391–392, 394, 396, 398–399, 401, 403, 405–406, 409, 411–422, 439 (1968–74); All-Star Batman and Robin #8-9 (variant) (2008)	Ra's al Ghul; Man-Bat; Francine Langstrom/She-Bat	Known for drawing the definitive 1970s visual interpretation that returned Batman to his gothic roots.
Jim Aparo	The Brave and the Bold; Batman: A Death in the Family (1988–1989)	KGBeast; Katana	
Brian Bolland	Batman: The Killing Joke (1988)		
Bob Brown		Talia al Ghul	
Norm Breyfogle		Ventriloquist (Arnold Wesker); Anarky; Victor Zsasz; Jeremiah Arkham; Amygdala	
Ernie Chan; 1975-1977		Black Spider (Eric Needham)	
Dick Giordano		Talia al Ghul; Leslie Thompkins	
Carmine Infantino		Barbara Gordon/Batgirl; Blockbuster; Cluemaster	Penciller and primary artist of the 1964 "New Look" Batman.
Kelley Jones; 1995-2010	Batman #515-519, 521–525, 527–532, 535-552 (1995-1998); Batman & Dracula: Red Rain (1991); Batman: Dark Joker – The Wild (1993); Batman: Bloodstorm HC (1994); Batman: Crimson Mist HC (1999); Batman: Haunted Gotham #1-4 (2000); Batman: Gotham After Midnight #1-12 (2008–2009); Batman Annual #27 (2009); Batman: Unseen #1-5 (2009-2010)	Black Spider (Johnny LaMonica); Cassius Payne/Clayface	Artist best known for his runs on Batman with writer Doug Moench.
Jim Lee	Batman: Gotham Knights (Batman Black and White) #1 (2000); Batman: Hush (2002–2003); All Star Batman & Robin, the Boy Wonder (2005–2008); Batman Europa #1 (2015)	Hush	
Doug Mahnke	Batman: Under the Hood (2005–2006)	Jason Todd	
David Mazzucchelli	Batman: Year One (1987)	Gillian B. Loeb; Arnold Flass; Carmine Falcone	
Tom Mandrake		Black Mask; Film Freak	
Dave McKean	Arkham Asylum: A Serious House on Serious Earth (1989)		
Sheldon Moldoff		Ace the Bat-Hound; Mr. Freeze (as Mr Zero); Poison Ivy; Calendar Man; Matt Hagen/Clayface; Bette Kane/Bat-Girl; Julie Madison; Bat-Mite; Lew Moxon	One of Bob Kane's primary "ghost artists".
Jim Mooney		Thomas Blake/Catman	
Don Newton		Jason Todd/Robin; Killer Croc; Hamilton Hill	
Graham Nolan		Bane	
George Pérez		Bette Kane/Flamebird; Deathstroke	
Jerry Robinson		Dick Grayson; Alfred Pennyworth; Joker; Tony Zucco	Early ghost artist for Bob Kane.
Marshall Rogers	Batman: Strange Apparitions		
Tim Sale	Batman: The Long Halloween (1996–1997)		
Walter Simonson		Rupert Thorne; Silver St. Cloud	
Lew Schwartz		Deadshot; Killer Moth	
Ryan Sook	Arkham Asylum: Living Hell (2003)	Great White Shark; Aaron Cash	
Dick Sprang		Riddler; Killer Moth	
Curt Swan		Killer Croc	While best known for Superman work, he drew many late 1950s and early 1960s Batman covers, and was the primary artist on the Batman and Superman team-ups in World's Finest Comics during the same period.

=== Other notable contributors ===
Name	Title	Tenure	Notable titles	Characters (co-) created By	Notes
Tim Burton	Film director	1989; 1992	Batman; Batman Returns		Pushed Batman into the public eye by making him dark outside of the comic book media.
Paul Dini	Television (animation) and video game writer	1992-1995; 1999-2001; 2009; 2011	Batman: The Animated Series; The New Batman Adventures; Batman Beyond; Batman: Arkham Asylum; Batman: Arkham City	Victor Fries (not Mr. Freeze); Nora Fries; Harley Quinn; Terry McGinnis/Batman	Came up with a newer, more tragic origin story for Mr. Freeze, in Batman: The Animated Series, involving the creation of the character of Nora Fries, which is now commonly used in the comics.
William Dozier	TV producer	1966-1968	Batman	Barbara Gordon/Batgirl	Produced and narrated (without credit in latter capacity) the Batman 1966 TV series.
Christopher Nolan	Film director	2005; 2008; 2012	Batman Begins; The Dark Knight; The Dark Knight Rises		Rebooted the Batman film franchise into a more realistic setting.
Jack Schiff	Comic book editor				
Julius Schwartz	Comic book editor	1964-1979	None	Barbara Gordon/Batgirl	Commissioned "The Million-Dollar Debut of Batgirl", the story in which Barbara Gordon was introduced as both herself and the Silver Age of Comics Batgirl.
Lorenzo Semple Jr.	TV writer	1966-1968	Batman		Developed and wrote most early episodes of the Batman 1966 TV series after ABC-TV had acquired the rights and chosen 20th Century Fox Television as the studio through which it was produced.
Bruce Timm	Animator & producer	1992-1995; 1999-2001	Batman: The Animated Series; The New Batman Adventures; Batman Beyond	Victor Fries (not Mr. Freeze); Nora Fries; Harley Quinn; Terry McGinnis/Batman	Created character sheets for Batman: The Animated Series.

== See also ==
- List of Superman creators
- List of Wonder Woman creators
- List of Green Lantern creators
