= List of Green Lantern creators =

Throughout DC Comics history, the mythos of the fictional Green Lanterns has changed dramatically from the initial creation of Alan Scott to the thriving Green Lantern Corps of Hal Jordan. This list identifies some comics creators who made notable contributions with enduring impact.

== Creators of Earth's Green Lantern Corps members ==
- Alan Scott
  - Bill Finger - creator, writer
  - Martin Nodell - creator, artist
- Hal Jordan and Guy Gardner
  - John Broome - creator, writer
  - Gil Kane - creator, artist
- John Stewart
  - Dennis O'Neil - creator, writer
  - Neal Adams - creator, artist
- Kyle Rayner
  - Ron Marz - creator, writer
  - Darryl Banks - creator, artist
- Simon Baz
  - Geoff Johns - creator, writer
  - Doug Mahnke - creator, artist
- Jessica Cruz
  - Geoff Johns - creator, writer
  - Ethan Van Sciver - creator, artist
- Sojourner Mullein
  - N. K. Jemisin - creator, writer
  - Jamal Campbell - creator, artist

== Notable contributors ==
- Steve Englehart - created Kilowog and the current Guy Gardner with artist Joe Staton, and started the first volume of Green Lantern Corps.
- Dave Gibbons - worked with Alan Moore and started a new volume of Green Lantern Corps.
- Mike Grell - artist that took part with writer Dennis O'Neil in the Green Lantern/Green Arrow title, starting with #90 in 1976.
- Geoff Johns - wrote commercially successful Green Lantern: Rebirth for which he was nominated for Wizard Fan Award: Best Writer, and launched ongoing monthly Green Lantern, which he received a Wizard Fan Award: Best Writer. Johns followed with the commercial and critical success Sinestro Corps War which CBR name "Best of 2007" and named Johns "Best Writer of 2007".
- Alan Moore - most notably created GL Corps member Mogo, as well as Sodam Yat and the prophecy of the Blackest Night.
- Ivan Reis - artist who worked with Geoff Johns for most of the fourth volume of Green Lantern, for which he was nominated for a Wizard Fan Award: Breakout Talent, most notably on the Sinestro Corps War.
- Joe Staton - created Kilowog and the current Guy Gardner with writer Steve Englehart, and started the first volume of Green Lantern Corps.
- Peter Tomasi - editor on the Lantern titles until he became a writer and succeeded Dave Gibbons as writer of Green Lantern Corps, wrote epilogue parts of the Sinestro Corps War and fleshed out the character of Sodam Yat.
- Patrick Gleason - penciler of the current volume of Green Lantern Corps.
- Ethan Van Sciver - penciler for Green Lantern: Rebirth which he was nominated for a Wizard Fan Award: Best Penciller and relaunched the monthly title with Geoff Johns.
- Gerard Jones - writer of Emerald Dawn 1 & 2 and creator of Boodikka and Tomar-Tu. He launched the third volume of Green Lantern in 1990.

== See also ==
- List of Batman creators
- List of Superman creators
- List of Wonder Woman creators
