= Captain Strong =

- Captain Strong as depicted in Harley Quinn Vol 2 #18 (September 2015). Art by Chad Hardin and Jed Dougherty.

Publication information
- Publisher: DC Comics
- First appearance: Action Comics #421 (February 1973)
- Created by: Cary Bates

In-story information
- Full name: Horatio Strong
- Abilities: Superhuman strength

Captain Strong is a fictional character in DC Comics, introduced in Action Comics #421 (1973) as a parody of Popeye. Created by writer Cary Bates, Strong gains superhuman strength by consuming "sauncha," a special seaweed with drug-like effects that enhance his power but cause addiction and erratic behavior. Initially using his abilities to help others, he becomes friends with Superman, unaware of his dual identity as Clark Kent. In The New 52 series, Strong reappears with Harley Quinn’s team, once again struggling with the seaweed’s effects. Later, he aids Harley’s gang in battle using his skills as a former sniper.

== Publishing history ==
First appearing in Action Comics #421 (February 1973), Captain Horatio Strong was created by writer Cary Bates, who wondered what would happen if Superman and Popeye met. In the first story, Bates presented a darker side of the famous sailor; the green vegetable that gave him his strength was a drug, making him powerful yet irrational.

The character was designed to be more realistic than Popeye, but similar to him in appearance and speech. Other characters who appeared in his stories included Carnox (the DC Comics version of Lummox), his girlfriend Olivia Tallow (a takeoff of Olive Oyl), whom he later married, and his idle rich friend J. Wellington Jones (a knockoff of J. Wellington Wimpy). In one story, Strong reunites with his long-lost father, Pappy Strong (a takeoff of Poopdeck Pappy).

Captain Strong appeared in five stories from 1973 to 1985 and reappeared in The New 52 volume of Harley Quinn's solo title.

== Fictional biography ==
Horatio Strong, captain of The Fantasia, is naturally stronger than most men, but one day he discovered a strange seaweed he called "sauncha", the consumption of which gave him superhuman strength. At first he used his newfound power to do good for others, but the sauncha (which turned out to be of extraterrestrial origin) had unexpected side effects; it acted like a drug, making its user dangerously irrational and causing severe withdrawal pains. After being stopped by Superman and taken to a hospital, Strong swore off ever using sauncha again, saying that he would only rely on normal vegetables to keep up his strength. Strong became a friend of both Clark Kent and Superman, never realizing that they were the same man.

=== The New 52 ===
In The New 52, Captain Strong is reintroduced as trying to untangle his boat from some strangely glowing seaweed. He eats some of the seaweed, which has some strange effect on him, making him glow like the seaweed. Later on, his wife reports him missing and hires Harley Quinn's newly formed Gang of Harleys to find him. Two members of the gang go out to investigate. They find him in the toilets of a bar, but the seaweed gave him super-strength and drove him mad, so he knocks them down. Harley and the other members of her gang go after him. Harley eats his seaweed and begins to hallucinate. While she is taken to a hospital, Strong takes the rest of the gang to his boat. There, his mind clears for a moment, but the seaweed caused addiction and he eats more of it, becoming irrational again. Harley rushes to save her gang, but Strong defeats her. Captain Strong is only stopped by the arrival of Mrs. DiAngelis, mother of five of the Harley Gang members. She shoots him with machine gun fire, knocking him down. She and the Harleys pitch the alien seaweed. Later, while on an island of doom created by a rich and crazed stalker of Harley's calling herself Harley Sinn, Captain Strong gives Harley's gang a ride to rescue her. During a battle with mercenaries, it is revealed that he is a former sniper and still has a gun, providing assistance to Harley and her friends by taking out their adversaries, a collection of mercenaries hired by Sinn, from his boat.
