= Eviless =

DC Comics supervillain

- Eviless as depicted in Wonder Woman #28 (April 1948). Art by Harry G. Peter.

Publication information
- Publisher: DC Comics
- First appearance: Wonder Woman #10 (Fall 1944)
- Created by: William Moulton Marston (writer), Harry G. Peter (artist)

In-story information
- Team affiliations: Saturnian Invasion Force; Villainy Inc.
- Notable aliases: Saturna
- Abilities: Skilled hand-to-hand combatant, wields a bullwhip

Eviless (also called Saturna) is a fictional character appearing in DC Comics publications and related media, commonly as a recurring adversary of the superhero Wonder Woman. A slave driver from the planet Saturn, she had several Golden Age clashes with Wonder Woman before founding the first incarnation of Villainy Inc. alongside the Cheetah, Doctor Poison, Giganta, and Queen Clea.

== Fictional character biography ==
A slave driver from Saturn (later retconned as a subatomic Earthlike world near or within Saturn), Eviless and Duke Mephisto Saturno (of the Saturnian Invasion Force) battled Wonder Woman. Although defeated by Wonder Woman, she later returns after being taken to Transformation Island. Eviless fakes her death by controlling her heartbeat and steals Wonder Woman's lasso. Eviless places a splinter in the lock of the Venus Girdle, meaning it did not affect her, though she pretended she had reformed. After taking control of a guard using the lasso, she frees several prisoners from Transformation Island and unites them as Villainy Inc. The team is unsuccessful against Wonder Woman, despite kidnapping her mother Hippolyta, and are defeated and captured.

After the events of DC Rebirth, Eviless' history was altered. She took the name Saturna and became the leader of the Crimson Men, a doomsday cult. She possesses necromantic abilities, such as forming black wings on her body and controlling the dead. Saturna battles Steve Trevor and his team while investigating a mystical island inhabited by children. Trevor defeats Saturna twice, the second of which left her deep within a chasm, covered with rocks.

== Powers and abilities ==
Eviless does not have any superpowers, but skillfully uses a whip to control her subjects. At times, she has appeared to put herself into a deathlike trance at will by stopping her heart.

Post-Rebirth, Saturna has an array of magical necrotic abilities.

== See also ==
- List of Wonder Woman enemies
