= Queen Clea =

- Queen Clea as depicted in Wonder Woman: The Ultimate Guide to the Amazon Princess (November 2003). Art by Phil Jimenez.

Publication information
- Publisher: DC Comics
- First appearance: Wonder Woman (1st series) #8 (Spring 1944)
- Created by: William Moulton Marston

In-story information
- Alter ego: Clea
- Species: Atlantean
- Place of origin: Atlantis
- Team affiliations: Villainy Inc. Society
- Abilities: Can survive under deep water pressure, durable skin, can breathe air and water, super strength, uses the Trident of Poseidon.

Queen Clea is a fictional character appearing in DC Comics publications and related media, commonly as a recurring adversary of the superhero Wonder Woman. The ruthless dictator of Venturia, a remote kingdom on the sunken continent of Atlantis, she first appeared in 1944's Wonder Woman #8, written by Wonder Woman creator William Moulton Marston and illustrated by Harry G. Peter. After several clashes with Wonder Woman, she became a member of Villainy Inc., a team consisting of several of Wonder Woman's Golden Age foes, including the Cheetah, Giganta, and Doctor Poison. She appeared periodically during Wonder Woman's Silver and Bronze Age adventures, and would be re-introduced during DC Comics' Post-Crisis era as the leader of Villainy Inc.

== Fictional character biography ==
=== Golden Age ===
The Golden Age Queen Clea in Wonder Woman (vol. 1) #28, April 1948; art by Harry G. Peter.

As Queen of a crumbling Atlantean outpost named Venturia, Queen Clea enslaved the men of her realm and amused herself by putting them to death in gladiatorial combat. Wanting to extend her rule, Clea repeatedly attacks Venturia's flourishing sister city of Aurania, though unsuccessfully. Despite this failure, she expanded her ideas towards domination over the entire lost continent of Atlantis.

After Clea conquers the rival kingdom of Venturia, Venturian queen Eeras escapes to the surface world. Eeras encounters Steve Trevor, who she convinces to help transport her to Atlantis. However, the two are captured by Auranian troops. Wonder Woman comes to their rescue and forms an alliance with Eeras. Eeras uses the "devitamizer" derived from the Van Vlek formula to make all Auranians present collapse.

Clea covertly rebuilds Aurania's power and forms a band of Auranian pirates who attacked surface world ships. Clea is especially interested in getting herself some of the bigger, stronger and smarter men of the surface world, and makes a deal with a ship carrying German prisoners who were being deported to America for farm work. As the German soldiers, equipped with local swords and shields, attack the Venturians, Clea personally sneaks behind enemy lines to claim the devitamizer. Wonder Woman frees the prisoners, then captures Clea.

Queen Eeras, being reluctant to execute prisoners, agrees to hand Clea and her daughter Ptra to the Amazons. Clea escapes and attacks Octavia, daughter of Eeras. When Clea returns to Atlantis, she finds that there had been a revolution and that the men had taken over. Wonder Woman and Octavia escape and meet with Steve Trevor and the Holliday Girls. In the meanwhile, Clea manages to convince the Atlantean king to let her rule, but is defeated by the Holliday Girls.

=== Bronze Age ===
The Bronze Age Queen Clea teams up with the Penguin in Justice League of America (vol. 1) #135, October 1976; art by Dick Dillin.

In a later story, Clea steals the fabled trident of Poseidon to make herself virtually unstoppable. She allies with King Kull and his agents against the Justice League and Justice Society when he plans to wipe out life on Earth-One, Earth-Two, and Earth-S so his subjugated Beast-men can rule once again. The Earth-One Superman, Earth-One Green Arrow, Earth-S Spy Smasher, and Earth-Two Wonder Woman defeat Clea and her allies without much trouble.

=== Modern Age ===
Clea battles Hippolyta, who was acting as Wonder Woman in the 1940s, and is defeated. Clea works with the original Villainy Inc. in an attempt to overtake Hippolyta, which is unsuccessful. A new version of the team is assembled in modern times in the hopes of finishing where her plans left off.

Clea appears as part of a large team of super-villains assigned to kill Wonder Woman. She is once again in possession of the Trident of Poseidon and has had her abilities amplified by Circe. She eventually is subdued by several of Wonder Woman's allies and taken into custody by Nemesis and the Department of Metahuman Affairs.

During the Infinite Crisis storyline, Queen Clea appears as a member of Alexander Luthor Jr.'s Secret Society of Super Villains.

== Powers and abilities ==
As an Atlantean, Queen Clea can breathe both above and under water. Clea can also physically withstand the great amounts of undersea depth pressures. Because of this, her body is resistant to most physical injury and provides a form of super strength. When in possession of the mystical trident belonging to Poseidon, Clea's strength levels increase and she has limited control over water. The trident also has the ability to fire force blasts. Due to a spell by the witch Circe, Clea now also has the ability of flight. Also, as Clea was depicted as arguably young both in the 1940s while battling Hippolyta and around the same age when later battling Diana in modern times, it can be suggested that Clea either has a longer than average lifespan or is possibly immortal.

== Other versions ==
An alternate universe version of Queen Clea appears in Absolute Wonder Woman. This version is supposedly the last Atlantean on Earth, and was trapped in an underground maze by G.A.T.E.S and became the self-proclaimed ruler of the fish-men population residing there. When Wonder Woman arrives in the maze, she battles with Clea before freeing her and the other prisoners in the maze.

== In other media ==
Queen Ocina, a character inspired by Clea, appears in the Super Friends episode "Return of Atlantis", voiced by Kathy Garver. She is the ruler of an unnamed Atlantean city which is a misandrist society dominated by women.

== See also ==
- List of Wonder Woman enemies
