= Conduit (character) =

- Conduit as depicted in Adventures of Superman #0 (October 1994). Art by Barry Kitson (penciler) and Glenn Whitmore (colorist).

Publication information
- Publisher: DC Comics
- First appearance: Superman: The Man of Steel #0 (October 1994)
- Created by: Dan Jurgens; Louise Simonson

In-story information
- Alter ego: Kenny Braverman
- Species: Human
- Abilities: Kryptonite-based energy manipulation

Conduit (Kenny Braverman) is a fictional character appearing in American comic books published by DC Comics.

== Publication history ==
Conduit first appeared in Superman: The Man of Steel #0 and was created by Dan Jurgens and Louise Simonson. In the 1995 story arc "Death of Clark Kent," spanning four Superman titles, Conduit tried to murder everyone important to Kent.

In The New 52 continuity reboot, Kenny Braverman appears in a flashback when Psycho-Pirate uses his Medusa Mask to make Superman relive his history.

Braverman is reintroduced as Conduit in Action Comics #1044 as part of the Action Comics story arc "A World Without Clark Kent", where Amanda Waller tasks him with retrieving the Genesis Fragment, a radioactive energy source with mutagenic properties, in exchange for clemency.

== Fictional character biography ==
On the night Kenny Braverman's mother gave birth to him, a powerful snowstorm made the roads icy and slick. On the way to the hospital, the car Kenny's father was driving skidded on ice. Moments later, Kenny was born in the car and infant Kal-El's starship passed overhead. Kenny suffered radiation poisoning due to kryptonite exposure from the ship, causing him to be sick throughout his childhood. Kenny becomes an athlete at Smallville High School, but always comes in second place to Clark Kent.

Kenny volunteers to be thoroughly examined by the CIA to determine how the kryptonite affected his body. He is recruited into a covert operation in France, but Clark thwarts Kenny's efforts. This, coupled with years of being outdone by him in their youth, causes Kenny to despise Clark.

Kenny later develops the ability to generate kryptonite radiation, which he focuses through a special high-tech suit, and assumes the codename Conduit. When Conduit discovers Superman's secret identity as Clark Kent, he begins to stalk him, planting bombs intended to kill Clark's friends and co-workers. Superman attempts to go into hiding, but Conduit tracks him down and knocks him unconscious. Conduit places Clark in a fake Smallville set twenty years in the past, filled with android versions of its citizens programmed to hate Superman and regard Conduit as a hero. Several of them attack Superman, including imitations of Lois Lane and Jonathan and Martha Kent. Superman agrees to fight Conduit without powers at Smallville's football stadium. During the battle, Conduit absorbs a massive amount of energy, which overloads his body and leaves him a lifeless husk.

== Powers and abilities ==
Conduit wears body armor that provides some protection from energy and physical attacks. His powered exo-frame allows him to fly. He has two extendable cables with which he can ensnare an opponent as well as fire blasts of kryptonite radiation. Conduit also learned how to channel this energy he gave off back into his body to enhance his strength to a point where he could physically compete with Superman.

== In other media ==
- A young Kenny Braverman appears in the Superman: The Animated Series episode "New Kids in Town", voiced by Scott Menville. This version is a bully at Smallville High School.
- A young Kenny Braverman appears in Man of Steel, portrayed by Rowen Kahn. This version is a bully at Smallville High School.
- Conduit appears as a character summon in Scribblenauts Unmasked: A DC Comics Adventure.
- Conduit received an action figure in Kenner Products' Man of Steel toy line.

== See also ==
- List of Superman enemies
