= RMS Aurania =

RMS Aurania can refer to any of three ships originally owned and operated by the Cunard Line:

- RMS Aurania (1882), built in 1882, scrapped in 1905
- RMS Aurania (1916), built in 1916, completed as a troopship and torpedoed by a German U-boat in 1918
- RMS Aurania (1924), built in 1924, converted for use as an armed merchant cruiser in 1939, finally scrapped in 1961
