= Giganta =

DC Comics character

- Variant cover art of Justice League Unlimited #21 (July 2026); Art by Nathan Szerdy.

Publication information
- Publisher: DC Comics
- First appearance: Wonder Woman #9 (Summer 1944)
- Created by: William Moulton Marston; H. G. Peter; Sheldon Mayer

In-story information
- Alter ego: Doris Zeul
- Species: Metahuman (post-Crisis); Evolved gorilla (pre-Crisis)
- Team affiliations: Gorilla City; Injustice League; Secret Society of Super Villains; Villainy Inc. Secret Six; Legion of Doom; Female Furies; Suicide Squad; Justice League
- Notable aliases: Dr. Doris Zeul; Olga
- Abilities: Genius-level intellect; Size-shifting; Superhuman strength and durability

Giganta is a supervillain appearing in American comic books published by DC Comics, commonly as a recurring adversary of the superhero Wonder Woman, and an occasional foil of the superhero the Atom. She debuted as a brutish strongwoman in 1944's Wonder Woman #9, written by Wonder Woman creator William Moulton Marston and illustrated by Harry G. Peter, and went on to become one of Wonder Woman's most recognizable and persistent foes, appearing during every major era of the hero's comic book adventures, and adapted frequently for television and animation.

The modern incarnation of Giganta possesses the superhuman ability to increase her physical size and mass, effectively transforming into a giantess. This power-set was not a feature of her Golden or Silver Age comic book appearances, but was introduced first on television as part of the character's adaptation for Hanna-Barbera's 1978 Saturday morning cartoon series Challenge of the Superfriends. Giganta's size-changing abilities would not be incorporated into her portrayal in DC Comics publications until 2002.

Giganta has been adapted into several Wonder Woman-related television and animated film projects. She was played by Aleshia Brevard in the 1979 NBC live-action Legends of the Superheroes TV specials, in which the character was paired with the Atom (Alfie Wise) for a comedic tell-all interview about their supposed "odd couple" romance. Several years prior, actor Mickey Morton donned a gorilla-suit to play a version of the character (called Gargantua) in a 1976 episode of the ABC TV series Wonder Woman. In animation, Giganta has been played by voice actors Kimberly Brooks, Grey DeLisle, Ruth Forman, Jennifer Hale and Vanessa Marshall.

== Publication history ==
=== Creation and Golden Age ===
The Golden Age Giganta in Wonder Woman #28 (1948); art by Harry G. Peter.

In her first appearance, written by Wonder Woman's creator William Moulton Marston, Giganta is a gorilla who Professor Zool mutates into a human. In an ensuing struggle with Wonder Woman and her allies, Giganta foments a savage revolution, leading a group of prehistoric “cavemen” in an attempt to conquer civilized society.

Marston was a psychologist who conceived many of Wonder Woman's early foes as allegories for psychological and moral motifs. His characterization of Giganta blends the misconception that early humans directly descend from modern apes with the colonialist conflation of pre-civilization and amorality. As such, Giganta's nature as a supposedly primitive human is understood as granting her both animalistic and potentially malicious characteristics.

After several clashes with Wonder Woman, Giganta became a member of Villainy Inc., a team of supervillains consisting of several other foes of the hero, including Cheetah, Doctor Poison and Queen Clea.

=== Silver and Bronze Age ===
The Silver Age Giganta kidnaps Steve Trevor in Wonder Woman #163 (1966); art by Ross Andru.

By the 1960s, Wonder Woman's comic book adventures had made the leap from the Golden Age world of Earth-2 to the Silver/Bronze Age world of Earth-1. Giganta was reintroduced in a series of stories also featuring another of Wonder Woman's arch-foes, Doctor Psycho. In a slight reworking of her Golden Age origin, the now-blonde Silver Age Giganta was still a mutated ape, albeit better at speaking English, and less focused on a caveman revolution than on a resentment of Wonder Woman. Giganta would return in 1980 as an ally and romantic interest for the Flash's foe Gorilla Grodd, in a plot against Gorilla City. Once again red-haired, the character's visual design reflected her TV appearances two years earlier on Challenge of the Superfriends.

The Bronze Age Giganta in The Super Friends #30 (1980); art by Ramona Fradon.

=== Post-Crisis ===
After DC Comics rebooted its continuity in 1985 during the Crisis on Infinite Earths event, Wonder Woman, her supporting characters and many of her foes were re-imagined and reintroduced. Though Giganta was initially absent from this revised set of storylines, she eventually returned to the continuity in 1998 in a story by Wonder Woman writer/artist John Byrne. This version is Doris Zeul, a human who transferred her consciousness into the body of a gorilla named Giganta and later into circus strongwoman Olga. Now possessing a magically-endowed ability to increase her size and mass, Zeul embarked on a campaign to bring down Wonder Woman, a project which would lead her to join Villainy Inc.

The characterization of the post-Crisis Giganta de-emphasized savagery in favor of a more sympathetic interpretation. Storylines in The All-New Atom and Secret Six focus with some humor on Zeul's attempt to juggle a legitimate career in academia with a side-hustle as a villain-for-hire, as well as more seriously on the history of the chronic degenerative illness that led her to seek to transfer her consciousness.

== Fictional character biography ==
=== Earth-Two ===
Giganta in Wonder Woman #28.

Giganta was introduced as a foe of DC Comics character Wonder Woman during the Golden Age of Comic Books. In the story, a scientist named Professor Zool artificially mutates a gorilla named Giganta into a malicious red-haired strongwoman. The mutation machine goes haywire and reverts the world to an earlier stage. Giganta joins a primitive tribe to attack Wonder Woman, but is defeated. When the world gets to the Golden Age of humanity, Giganta causes trouble by encouraging a rebellion, which Wonder Woman stops. When the world returns to normal, Giganta is still in her "strongwoman" form. Giganta is ultimately subdued and captured by Wonder Woman and taken to Themyscira for rehabilitation.

Giganta joins a rebellion of prisoners held on the island started by the Saturnian slaver Eviless, thereby becoming a member of the criminal team Villainy Inc. Eviless steals Wonder Woman's lasso and kidnaps Hippolyta. Giganta joins with the Atlantean Queen Clea to cause trouble.

=== Earth-One ===
In 1966, Giganta's origin is revamped to include Doctor Psycho. In this story, Doctor Psycho hypnotized a zoo gorilla named Giganta to fall in love with Steve Trevor. After Wonder Woman defeats Giganta, Professor Zool appeared asking to have the gorilla turned over to her for experimentation. Taking advantage of this, Doctor Psycho took Giganta out of the zoo and brought her to Zool so that he can use an evolution ray on her. This turned Giganta into a huge blonde woman who still loves Steve Trevor. Wonder Woman defeated Giganta and took her to Paradise Island for rehabilitation.

=== Doris Zeul ===
The contemporary version of the character is the alter-ego of Doris Zeul, who suffers from a fatal blood disease. She captures Wonder Woman and plans to put her "life-essence" into Wonder Woman's body using an experimental machine. Interrupted by Wonder Girl halfway through the experiment she ends up with her consciousness in a test animal gorilla named Giganta. Desperate to return her mind to a human body, Zeul abducts a comatose circus strongwoman named Olga with size-changing abilities and transfers her mind into Olga's body.

Following her transformation, Giganta allies with Queen Clea and Villainy Inc. in an attempt to conquer the lost world of Skartaris. Villainy Inc. is defeated by Wonder Woman, but Giganta is subsequently seen as a member of several criminal groups, including the Secret Society of Super Villains.

Giganta in her One Year Later costume, which she continued to use until the New 52.

"One Year Later," Giganta, along with Cheetah and Doctor Psycho, engage in a battle with Donna Troy (who has assumed the identity of Wonder Woman one year after the events of Infinite Crisis), as part of a search for, as they term it, the "real" Wonder Woman (Diana). The villains continue their quest, holding Troy hostage to draw Diana out for a rescue attempt and contend with the current Wonder Girl, Robin, and Diana. Giganta and her allies also battle Hercules, who manages to defeat Giganta.

Giganta is a teacher at Ryan Choi's Ivy Town University. Infected and controlled by M'Nagalah, the monstrous Cancer god, she was sent to seduce and capture Ryan. After being freed from M'Nagalah's control, a seemingly repentant Dr. Zeul retains her position at Ivy University and approached Ryan for a second chance, despite the bizarre circumstances of their first meeting.

Before their second date, the Atom is approached by Wonder Woman on behalf of the Department of Metahuman Affairs and asked to wear a wire on his date with Dr. Zeul. After professing her desire to reform, she is informed that Ryan is wearing a wire and tears off the roof of the restaurant to see Wonder Woman and Ryan talking - unaware that Ryan had removed the wire. A fight between Wonder Woman and Giganta ensues. Wonder Woman quickly knocks Giganta out but Ryan intervenes to stop Wonder Woman from beating her further, after admitting she had lost her temper - they realize that Zeul has disappeared.

Giganta is also a member of Libra's Secret Society of Super Villains, during the Final Crisis and is shown as a thrall of Darkseid alongside several other super-powered women. She is now called Gigantrix. Over the course of the series she fights as one of the new incarnations of the Female Furies with Wonder Woman, Batwoman, and Catwoman. She is possessed by the spirit of the fury Stompa, and only freed when Supergirl smashes the skull-and-crossbones mask from her face.

Giganta is attacked by Diana while on her way to a date with Ryan Choi, implying that their relationship has survived despite earlier difficulties. Mellower than in her appearances in the All-New Atom series, she seems to accept and respect the shortcomings brought by their different lifestyles, going so far as to help Wonder Woman in a mission, reasoning that, with Ryan being a superhero, they should both be used to putting their heroics in front of their private lives.

Bane later recruits Giganta into the Secret Six. The team also includes the shrinking killer, Dwarfstar, who had hired Deathstroke and his Titans to kill Ryan Choi. Giganta initially seems unaware of this fact, admitting to Dwarfstar that she is dating the Atom (to Dwarfstar's amusement). Following a disastrous mission to Skartaris, Amanda Waller reveals the details of Ryan's murder to Giganta. After luring Dwarfstar to her bedroom with the promise of sex, Giganta strips him of his belt (the source of his powers) and beats him into submission.

=== The New 52 ===
In September 2011, DC Comics revised the fictional history of its comic book line under the title "The New 52". In the revised comic book line, Doris Zeul gained her abilities from radiation treatment intended to treat a rare blood disease. Giganta appears as a member of the Secret Society during the "Trinity War" storyline. She assists Vandal Savage and Signalman into tracking Pandora. When the three villains attack Pandora, Pandora successfully subdues Giganta. Her costume combines elements from her original and One Year Later costumes.

After her first encounter with Pandora, Giganta returns for revenge following the conclusion of the Forever Evil storyline. During their fight, Pandora looks into Giganta's soul, and reveals her origin story. Doris Zeul was a bullied child with a blood disease, but cured herself with a radical procedure that gave her her growth powers. A side-effect of the untested operation was that it reduced her intellect.

Giganta is later recruited by agents of S.H.A.D.E. to serve as a supernormal asset, fighting vampires and other monsters. She is tempted by the offer of a pardon for her crimes almost as much for the chance to kill things, which she admits to enjoying.

Amanda Waller recruits Giganta into Task Force XL to capture Damage. During the battle, Giganta revealed that she would love to study Damage's physiology. However, Damage bursts through Giganta's hand, leaving her to bandage herself while the rest of the team battle him.

Giganta appears in the storyline DC K.O., where she takes part in the eponymous tournament to combat Darkseid. Following the tournament, Giganta joins the Justice League as part of an amnesty deal given to her and other supervillains.

== Powers and abilities ==
Doris Zeul has the ability to increase her size (from roughly 6'6" to several hundred feet in seconds). Her abilities seem to be magical in nature since Black Alice can copy them.

Although her own physical powers are not on an inhuman level until she grows, even at maximum height, Giganta is still a formidable foe. At giant size, she is also one of the strongest women in the DC Universe. She easily overpowers Wonder Woman, Wonder Girl, and Power Girl at the same time with one hand without her giant form. In fact, she could crush their bones by her virtually unescapable grip. When fighting vampires alongside Pandora, she grew to eight-feet tall with her strength and durability enhanced to the point where its fangs cannot pierce through Zeul's skin.

=== Equipment ===
Giganta's suit is specialized to withstand bullets, resist extreme temperatures, and grow along with her. As Zeul, she possesses scientific knowledge.

== Other versions ==
=== Absolute Universe ===
An alternate universe version of Giganta appears in Absolute Wonder Woman. This version has the ability to shrink and grow and is a member of the Suicide Squad.

=== Flashpoint ===
Two conflicting versions of Giganta appear in Flashpoint. In the Lois Lane and the Resistance tie-in miniseries, Giganta appears as a member of the Amazons' Furies who resembles her aforementioned "Odyssey" counterpart and appears to lack powers. Conversely, in the Hal Jordan tie-in, she appears in her traditional costume and possesses powers.

=== Justice ===
An alternate universe version of Giganta appears in Justice. This version is a member of the Legion of Doom.

=== Odyssey ===
An alternate universe version of Giganta appears in the Wonder Woman storyline "Odyssey". This version, along with her universe, was created by Nemesis and was a dead Amazon who was resurrected by the Morrigan to hunt Wonder Woman. Additionally, Giganta lacks the ability to enlarge herself; instead possessing super-strength and a double-headed axe. After being told of the Morrigan's lies, Giganta defects to Wonder Woman's side.

=== The Legend of Wonder Woman ===
Giganta was set to appear in the second volume of The Legend of Wonder Woman, by Renae de Liz and Ray Dillon. However, DC cancelled the project for unknown reasons. De Liz later posted preliminary artwork featuring Giganta on Twitter.

== In other media ==
Giganta as she appears in Challenge of the Superfriends.

=== Television ===
Giganta as she appears in Justice League.

- A variation of Giganta's gorilla form called Gargantua appears in the Wonder Woman episode "Wonder Woman vs. Gargantua", performed by Mickey Morton. This version is a male gorilla with enhanced strength that Nazi animal behaviorist Erica Belgard took from Africa and trained to attack Wonder Woman. After succeeding in the latter task, Belgard sets up a trap for Wonder Woman and sets Gargantua on her so Belgard can join her Nazi High Command. While Gargantua nearly defeats Wonder Woman, he is shot by an MP and brought to a doctor, who is able to undo Belgard's programming. The Nazis take Gargantua back and subject him to electroconvulsive therapy in an attempt to restore it, but it fails when the gorilla fights and is subdued by Wonder Woman. After Belgard and her compatriots are apprehended, Wonder Woman returns Gargantua to Africa.
- Giganta appears in Challenge of the Superfriends, voiced by Ruth Forman. This version is a member of the Legion of Doom who gained her abilities from Apache Chief's growth powder.
- Giganta appears in Legends of the Superheroes, portrayed by Aleshia Brevard. This version is a member of the Legion of Doom who does not demonstrate the ability to grow in size, but retains her super-strength, and later becomes engaged to the Atom.
- Giganta appears in Super Friends (1980), voiced again by Ruth Forman.
- Giganta appears in series set in the DC Animated Universe (DCAU), voiced by Jennifer Hale. Similarly to her original comics depiction, this version is an ape who was turned into a metahuman woman, though Grodd was the one who carried out the procedure. As such, Giganta becomes a devoted follower of his and a member of his Secret Society.
  - First appearing in the Justice League two-part episode "Secret Society", she recruits Shade into the eponymous group before they fight the Justice League, who eventually defeat the Society.
  - Giganta appears in Justice League Unlimited as a member of Grodd's expanded Society. Prior to and during the episodes "Alive!" and "Destroyer", Lex Luthor takes control of the Society, but Grodd mounts a mutiny. In the ensuing conflict, Giganta sides with Luthor until Darkseid attacks and kills most of the Society. Luthor, Giganta, and the survivors join forces with the League to thwart Darkseid's invasion of Earth.
- Giganta made a non-speaking appearance in the Batman: The Brave and the Bold episode "Powerless!".
- Giganta appears in the "Wonder Woman" segment of DC Nation Shorts.
- Giganta appears in the Robot Chicken DC Comics Special, voiced by Alex Borstein. This version is a member of the Legion of Doom.
- Giganta appears in the DC Super Hero Girls franchise, voiced by Grey DeLisle.
  - She first appears in the TV special DC Super Hero Girls: Super Hero High and its short sequel "New Beginnings".
  - Giganta appears in DC Super Hero Girls (2019). This version is biracial, with a Caucasian father and an African-American mother, a member of the Super Villain Girls, and an uncouth, vindictive, and cynical school bully with a severe hatred for superheroes who loves to target the weak. Additionally, her powers are derived from a serum she stole from her parents and primarily manifest when she becomes angry.
- Giganta appears in Harley Quinn, voiced by Vanessa Marshall. This version is the ex-wife of Doctor Psycho, with whom she has a son named Herman.
- Giganta appears in Bat-Fam, voiced by Fred Tatasciore. This version is an ex-villain.
- Giganta appears in the My Adventures with Superman episode "All's Fair in Love and W.O.R.M.S.", voiced by Vella Lovell. This version dates Jimmy Olsen, becoming obsessed with him, before she is stopped by Superman and Zazzala and Tazzala.

=== Film ===
- Giganta makes a cameo appearance in Superman/Batman: Public Enemies, voiced by Andrea Romano.
- Giganta appears in the Lego Super Heroes film series, voiced by April Winchell.
- Giganta appears in Wonder Woman: Bloodlines, voiced by Kimberly Brooks. This version is a member of Villainy Inc.
- Giganta makes a non-speaking appearance in Justice League Dark: Apokolips War.
- Giganta makes a non-speaking appearance in Injustice.
- Giganta appears in Teen Titans Go! & DC Super Hero Girls: Mayhem in the Multiverse, voiced again by Grey DeLisle. This version is a member of the Legion of Doom.
- Giganta appears in Scooby-Doo! and Krypto, Too!.

=== Video games ===
- Giganta appears in DC Universe Online, voiced by Lana Lesley. This version is a member of the Secret Society whose design is based on her appearance in One Year Later.
- Giganta appears as a character summon in Scribblenauts Unmasked: A DC Comics Adventure.
- Giganta makes a background cameo appearance in Injustice: Gods Among Us as a part of the Hall of Justice stage.
- Giganta appears as a mini-boss and unlockable playable character in Lego Batman 3: Beyond Gotham, voiced by Erica Luttrell.
- Giganta appears as a playable character in DC Legends.
- Giganta appears in DC Super Hero Girls: Teen Power, voiced again by Grey DeLisle.

=== Miscellaneous ===
- Giganta and her pet giraffe, Patches, appear in The Biggest Little Hero, by John Sazaklis and published by Capstone as part of their DC Super-Pets line of illustrated children's books.
- The DCAU incarnation of Giganta appears in Justice League Unlimited #38.
- Giganta appears in a flashback in Teen Titans Go! #54.
- An illusion of Giganta created by Doctor Psycho appears in Wonder Woman '77 #6.
- An alternate universe incarnation of Giganta makes a non-speaking appearance in the Justice League: Gods and Monsters Chronicles episode "Big". This version is a robot developed by Kobra.
- Giganta appears in DC Super Hero Girls (2015), voiced by Grey DeLisle.
- Giganta appears in the Suicide Squad: Hell to Pay tie-in sequel comic.

== See also ==
- List of Wonder Woman enemies
