= Doctor Poison =

- The Marina Maru version of Doctor Poison as depicted in Wonder Woman (vol. 2) #151 (December 1999). Art by Matthew Clark (penciler), Tom Simmons (inker), and Patricia Mulvihill (colorist).

Publication information
- Publisher: DC Comics
- First appearance: Sensation Comics #2 (February 1942)
- Created by: William Moulton Marston; Harry G. Peter

In-story information
- Alter ego: Princess Maru; Marina Maru
- Team affiliations: Villainy Inc. Secret Society of Super-Villains; Godwatch
- Abilities: Scientific genius in fields of chemistry and biology; Engineering of pathogens, poisons, toxins, plagues and chemical-based weapons

Doctor Poison is a fictional character appearing in DC Comics publications and related media, commonly as a recurring adversary of the superhero Wonder Woman. A sadistic bioterrorist with a ghoulish face, she first appeared in 1942’s Sensation Comics #2, written by Wonder Woman creator William Moulton Marston and illustrated by Harry G. Peter, and holds a distinction as Wonder Woman’s first costumed supervillain.

As the narrative continuity of Wonder Woman comics has been adjusted by different writers and artists throughout the years, various versions of Doctor Poison have been presented, usually as perversely cruel toxicologists of Japanese descent. There have been at least four different incarnations of the character since her debut: (1) the Golden Age Doctor Poison Princess Maru; (2) the unnamed Post-Crisis Doctor Poison and Maru’s granddaughter, first appearing in 1999’s Wonder Woman (vol. 2) #151; (3) the short-lived New 52 Doctor Poison, a Russian scientist known only as Dr. Maru, first appearing in 2016’s Wonder Woman (vol. 4) #48; and (4) Colonel Marina Maru, a Post-Rebirth reformulation of the character who heads an elite team of mercenaries known as "Poison", first appearing in 2017’s Wonder Woman (vol. 5) #13.

Elena Anaya portrayed the character in the 2017 DC Extended Universe film Wonder Woman.

== Publication history ==
=== Golden Age publication ===
In her first appearance, Doctor Poison is presented as an ostensibly male figure in a hooded green surgical gown and black domino mask. Depicted with an eerie wide-eyed gaze and unsettling grimace, the character was an Axis scientist and mastermind who headed both the fictional Nazi Poison Division and the chemical research branch of the Japanese army. Apprehended by Wonder Woman after commanding a bio-attack on an Allied military base, Doctor Poison is unmasked as a young woman named Princess Maru, a Japanese royal who disguised herself as a male supervillain to better protect her identity – a genderplay trope her creator William Moulton Marston incorporated into several other foes he conceived to battle Wonder Woman, including the Blue Snowman and Hypnota. Princess Maru made subsequent Golden Age appearances disguised as Doctor Poison even after her true identity had been revealed. After several clashes with Wonder Woman, she became a member of Villainy Inc., a team of supervillains consisting of several of Wonder Woman's foes, including the Cheetah, Giganta and Queen Clea.

=== Post-Crisis publication ===
Following the storyline Crisis on Infinite Earths (1985), DC Comics' fictional continuity was rebooted. Wonder Woman, her supporting characters and many of her foes were re-imagined and reintroduced. A retooled Doctor Poison made her first appearance in this continuity in 1999. Now the unstable granddaughter of the original Princess Maru, she is attired in a still-androgynous dark green leather trench and cowl, paying homage to her grandmother's Golden Age surgical gown. "[The Post-Crisis] Dr. Poison presents a deliberately ghoulish face to the world. Molecularly bonded appliqués peel back her eyelids to achieve a permanent stare. Dental hooks pull her lips into a rictus of revulsion". After several clashes with Wonder Woman, Doctor Poison joined Villainy Inc. and attempted to abet Queen Clea, and later the sentient computer virus Trinity, in taking over the other-dimensional realm of Skartaris. She subsequently joined the Secret Society of Super Villains and, under the guidance of Ares and in collaboration with fellow Society members the Cheetah, Felix Faust and T. O. Morrow, created the powerful golem Genocide as part of a plot to kill Wonder Woman.

=== 2010s publication ===
In 2016, a new version of Doctor Poison, a vengeful Russian scientist known only as Dr. Maru, was introduced and briefly battled Wonder Woman before being apprehended. A year later, as part of DC Comics' Rebirth continuity reboot, yet another version of the character was introduced, this time as the Japanese-American mercenary Colonel Marina Maru, a for-hire operative of Veronica Cale.

== Fictional character biography ==
=== Princess Maru ===
==== Golden Age ====
The Golden Age Doctor Poison in Sensation Comics #2 (February 1942); art by Harry G. Peter.

Princess Maru comes from Imperial Japan. She first appeared as the chief of the poison division for a Nazi spy band who had planned to contaminate the United States Army's water with "Reverso", a drug that compels whoever takes it to "do the exact opposite of what they are told". She disguised her sex by wearing a bulky hooded costume and a mask where she took on the name of Doctor Poison. Her underlings captured Steve Trevor and brought him to their base in America where he was questioned by Doctor Poison. Wonder Woman, disguised as a nurse, aided Steve Trevor but was forced to flee the scene after a lengthy battle. Meanwhile, the Reverso drug was successful in turning thousands of American soldiers against their superiors. Wonder Woman recruited Etta Candy to help her create a diversion for Doctor Poison's troops, which led to the defeat of the villain. When Wonder Woman pulled her disguise off, she discovered Doctor Poison to be Maru, a Japanese princess. Maru made one more attempt to defeat the amazon, but was tackled by Etta Candy and coerced into giving up the antidote. She was later taken into police custody.

Later, Princess Maru escaped imprisonment and disguised herself as Mei Sing, a "princess" who worked in a Chinese nightclub. She once again captured Steve Trevor, who could not see through her disguise. This led to another encounter with Wonder Woman, whom Maru defeated with an anesthetic gas grenade. Maru had been perfecting a green gas which would clog the carburetors of the US planes. This plan was foiled once again by Wonder Woman.

Instead of placing Maru back in prison, Wonder Woman sentenced her to Transformation Island, the Amazon penal colony where many female criminals were sent to reform. Although the majority of inmates have reformed with loving submission, Maru and seven other women refused to change their ways. Eviless banded these rebellious super-villains together under the name Villainy Inc. Maru returned to her Doctor Poison disguise and tricked Queen Hippolyta into believing men had invaded Paradise Island. The villains were able to capture Hippolyta's girdle, which they used to defeat Wonder Woman. Doctor Poison then joined Eviless, Blue Snowman, and Cheetah on a boat with the captive Wonder Woman, plotting to imprison the Amazon on Transformation Island for revenge. Wonder Woman attempted to escape by turning over the boat, but the four members of Villainy Inc. defeated her once again. After traveling to Transformation Island, Eviless tortured Wonder Woman until the reformed criminal Irene led a mutiny against Villainy Inc. In the ensuing chaos, Wonder Woman and Hippolyta broke free of their chains and managed to defeat Doctor Poison and her three companions.

==== Post-Crisis ====
After the events of Crisis on Infinite Earths, Doctor Poison was a founding member of Villainy Inc., but the team was created by Queen Clea instead of Eviless. As part of Villainy Inc., Doctor Poison battled Hippolyta, the first Wonder Woman, in the 1940s.

It was later revealed by her granddaughter that she had died after creating the Reverso drug, as she accidentally reversed her own growth patterns and had forgotten the antidote by becoming too young too fast, eventually reverting to a fetus and then nothing.

=== Marina Maru ===
The grandchild of the original Doctor Poison, this second incarnation appears in league with the demi-goddess Devastation. Doctor Poison's sex remains ambiguous, the only clues being long fingernails and a lipsticked grimace. She also joined the second Villainy Inc. and once again battled Wonder Woman. This incarnation of Doctor Poison confirmed that her grandmother battled Hippolyta as Wonder Woman during World War II before being killed by the "Reverso" drug.

==== The New 52 ====
In The New 52 continuity reboot, Maru is re-introduced as the Caucasian daughter of a Russian pair of scientists renowned for their knowledge of poisons. American spies had approached her parents as they thought the doctors' expertise could lead to the United States' domination in biological weaponry. When they refused, the Russian government discovered their practices. Her parents were branded terrorists by Russia, and imprisoned near Siberia where they died during interrogations. Doctor Poison blamed the United States for her parents' deaths and planned to take revenge through chemical attacks.

==== DC Rebirth ====
After the events of DC Rebirth, Doctor Poison's history was altered. In the current continuity, she is Colonel Marina Maru, a Japanese soldier working for her family's Poison organization. During Wonder Woman's first few months in the United States, she discovers a group of men infected with the Maru Virus, a poison that drives its victims to rage-induced murder. Ten years later, after Wonder Woman discovers that she has been living a lie for several years, Veronica Cale sends Poison to attack her.

== Powers and abilities ==
Doctor Poison is intelligent, which mainly extends to her considerable chemistry, toxicology, fluid dynamics, and lingual skills and knowledge. Her primary invention was a new and deadlier version of mustard gas, based on hydrogen instead of sulfur that she kept contained in pellets.

In the DC Rebirth universe, in addition to her scientific expertise, Doctor Poison is a trained soldier.

== Other versions ==
=== Absolute Wonder Woman ===
An alternate version of Doctor Poison appears in Absolute Wonder Woman. This version is a living cloud of poisonous gas who is forcibly working under Veronica Cale.

=== Sensational Wonder Woman ===
Doctor Poison appears in Sensational Wonder Woman as one of Queen Bee's generals.

=== Wednesday Comics ===
Doctor Poison appears in the Wonder Woman sections of anthology series Wednesday Comics.

== In other media ==
=== Television ===
- The Princess Maru incarnation of Doctor Poison makes a non-speaking appearance in the Batman: The Brave and the Bold episode "Joker: The Vile and the Villainous!".
- The Marina Maru incarnation of Doctor Poison appears in the My Adventures with Superman episode "Party Animals", voiced by Melanie Minichino. This version is the princess of Markovia.

=== Film ===
- An original incarnation of Doctor Poison appears in Wonder Woman (2017), portrayed by Elena Anaya. This version is Dr. Isabel Maru, a chemist recruited by General Errich Ludendorff to create chemical weapons for the Imperial German Army during World War I. Additionally, she wears a ceramic mask over the left side of her face to cover a facial disfigurement. She develops a deadlier form of mustard gas capable of bypassing gas masks after receiving the idea from Ares, but Steve Trevor steals a journal containing Maru's notes and eventually ends up at Themyscira, where he receives Diana Prince's help in stopping the war. Ares attempts to manipulate Prince into killing Maru, but the former eventually comes to recognize and accept humanity's flaws before sparing Maru, who subsequently flees.
- An unidentified incarnation of Doctor Poison appears in Wonder Woman: Bloodlines, voiced by Courtenay Taylor. This version is the co-leader of Villainy Inc. She leads the group in resurrecting Medusa to help them find Themyscira and steal their technology, but the Gorgon betrays the group, killing Poison in the process.

=== Video games ===
- An unidentified incarnation of Doctor Poison appears as a playable character in DC Legends.
- An unidentified incarnation of Doctor Poison appears as a playable character in Lego DC Super-Villains, voiced by Lauren Tom. This version is a member of the Legion of Doom.

=== Miscellaneous ===
An unidentified incarnation of Doctor Poison appears in DC Super Friends #24.

== See also ==
- List of Wonder Woman enemies
