= Joye Hummel =

American comics writer (1924–2021)

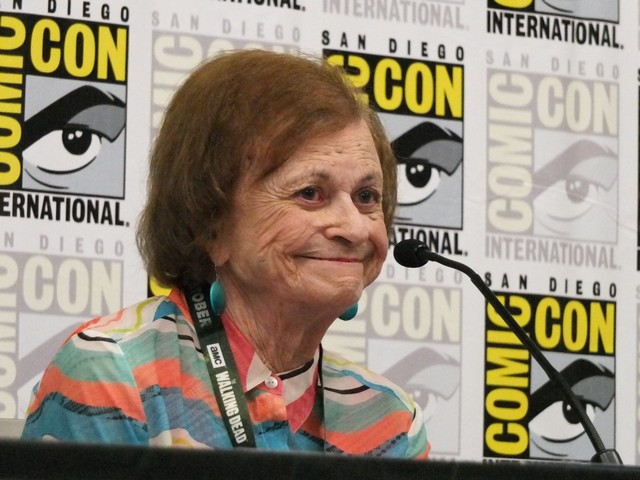
- Hummel at San Diego Comic-Con in 2018
- Born: April 4, 1924; Long Island, New York, U.S.
- Died: April 5, 2021 (aged 97); Winter Haven, Florida, U.S.
- Occupation: Comic book author
- Years active: 1944–1947
- Notable work: Wonder Woman
- Spouses: David W. Murchison (m. 1947; died 2000) Jack Kelly (m. 2002)
- Awards: Bill Finger Award, 2018

Joye Evelyn Hummel (April 4, 1924 – April 5, 2021) was an American comic book author. She is noted for ghost-writing more than 70 Wonder Woman stories between 1944 and 1947.

Hummel was 19 years old when she began as a typist for the comic. She went on to write its scripts after William Moulton Marston fell ill, and stopped authoring the comics in the same year as his death three years later. Her contributions only became well known in 2014 after she was interviewed for Jill Lepore's book The Secret History of Wonder Woman.

== Early life ==
Hummel was born on Long Island, New York on April 4, 1924. Her parents were managers of a grocery store chain, and she was their only child. She attended high school in Freeport, New York, before studying at Middlebury College. After one year, she dropped out of college, intending to keep her mother company after her parents divorced.

== Career ==
Hummel attended the Katharine Gibbs secretarial school in Manhattan, graduating shortly after March 1944. There, she excelled in a psychology course taught by William Moulton Marston, the co-author of Wonder Woman. He was swayed by the essays she wrote on a take-home exam, giving her the highest grades he had ever awarded to a student. He consequently employed her as his studio assistant after tea at the Harvard Club. At the time, Hummel had never read a comic book, let alone Wonder Woman. She initially worked on typing out the scripts, before going on to write over 70 of them. She was remunerated with $50 for every script she wrote.

When Marston became terminally ill with polio, Hummel took over. Her first story, titled "The Winged Maidens of Venus", appeared in the spring of 1945 in issue 12 of Wonder Woman. Within three years of her in this writing role, the character became a major success. Hummel quit authoring Wonder Woman in late 1947 after her honeymoon, ostensibly to spend more time at home and care for her stepdaughter. She later revealed that she was aggrieved by how the comic's new writers eliminated many of the feminist themes championed by Marston, who had died earlier that year. She stated: "Even if I had not left because of my new daughter, I would have resigned if I was told I had to make [Wonder Woman] a masculine thinking and acting superwoman." She subsequently became a stockbroker.

=== Later recognition ===
Hummel was the first woman to write stories for Wonder Woman. At the time, she did not receive any recognition, since all of the initial comics were published under the pen name "Charles Moulton". Her contributions started to come to light after she was interviewed by Jill Lepore in 2014 for her book The Secret History of Wonder Woman. Hummel was consequently contacted by the Smithsonian Institution, who asked her for the two packed binders containing the Wonder Woman issues she wrote. She also got in touch with Mark Evanier, who wanted to document the early years of comics. Hummel won the 2018 Bill Finger Award for Excellence in Comic Book Writing as a guest of honor at San Diego Comic-Con. This award is conferred on comic book authors who go under the radar at the Eisner Awards, and is managed by Evanier.

== Personal life ==
Hummel married her first husband, David W. Murchison, in 1947. Together, they had two children, Robb and David Jr.; the latter predeceased her in 2015. Her husband died in 2000, and she married Jack Kelly two years later. They remained married until her death, and resided in Florida during their later years. She adopted the married name of Joye Murchison Kelly.

Hummel died on April 5, 2021, one day after her 97th birthday, at her home in Winter Haven, Florida.
