= William Moulton Marston =

American psychologist and writer

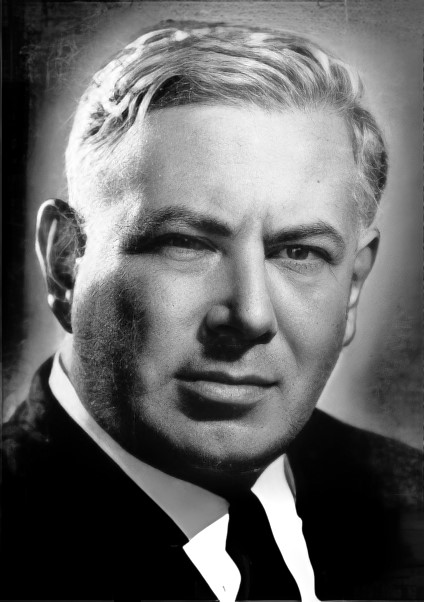
- William Moulton Marston in 1938
- Born: May 9, 1893; Saugus, Massachusetts, U.S.
- Died: May 2, 1947 (aged 53); Rye, New York, U.S.
- Other name: Charles Moulton
- Education: Harvard University (AB, LLB, PhD)
- Occupations: Psychologist; Inventor; Writer; Author
- Employer(s): American University; Tufts University
- Known for: Systolic blood-pressure test, Self-help writer, Advocate for women's potential, Important contributor to DISC
- Notable work: Wonder Woman
- Spouse: Elizabeth Holloway (m. 1915)
- Partner(s): Olive Byrne (1925–1947)
- Children: 4

William Moulton Marston (May 9, 1893 – May 2, 1947), also known by the pen name Charles Moulton (/ˈmoʊltən/), was an American psychologist who, with his wife Elizabeth Holloway, invented an early prototype of the polygraph. He was also known as a self-help author and comic book writer who created the character Wonder Woman.

Two women, his wife Elizabeth Holloway Marston and their polyamorous partner, Olive Byrne, greatly influenced Wonder Woman's creation.

He was inducted into the Comic Book Hall of Fame in 2006.

== Early life ==
Marston was born in the Cliftondale section of Saugus, Massachusetts, the son of Annie Dalton (née Moulton) and Frederick William Marston. Marston was educated at Harvard University, graduating Phi Beta Kappa and receiving his B.A. in 1915, an LL.B. in 1918, and a PhD in psychology in 1921.

== Career ==
While a student at Harvard, Marston sold his first script, The Thief, to filmmaker Alice Guy-Blaché, who directed the film in 1913. After teaching at American University in Washington, D.C., and Tufts University in Medford, Massachusetts, Marston traveled to Universal Studios in California in 1929, where he spent a year as Director of Public Services and taught at the University of Southern California.

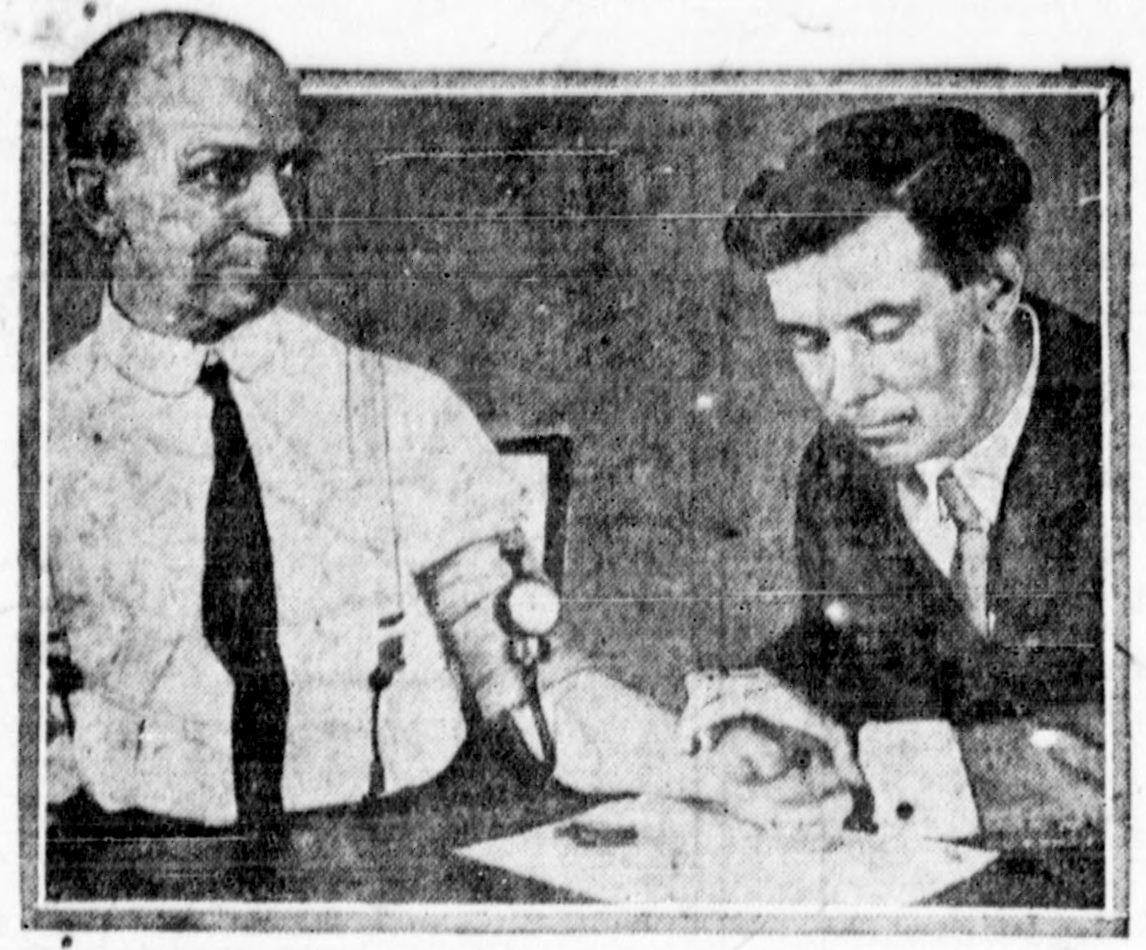
William Marston (right) in 1922, testing his lie detector invention

=== Polygraph ===
Marston was the creator of the systolic blood pressure test, which became one component of the modern polygraph invented by John Augustus Larson in Berkeley, California. Marston's wife, Elizabeth Holloway Marston, suggested a connection between emotion and blood pressure to William, observing that, "[w]hen she got mad or excited, her blood pressure seemed to climb".

Although Elizabeth is not listed as Marston's collaborator in his early work, Lamb, Matte (1996), and others refer directly and indirectly to Elizabeth's own work on her husband's research. She also appears in a picture taken in his laboratory in the 1920s (reproduced by Marston, 1938).

Marston set out to commercialize Larson's invention of the polygraph, when he subsequently embarked on a career in entertainment and comic book writing and appearing as a salesman in ads for Gillette Razors, using a polygraph motif. From his psychological work, Marston became convinced that women were more honest than men in certain situations and could work faster and more accurately. During his lifetime, Marston championed what he saw as the latent abilities and causes of the women of his day.

=== Pseudoscientific psychology ===
Marston was also a writer of essays in popular psychology. In 1928, he published a book entitled Emotions of Normal People, a defense of many sexual taboos, using much of Byrne's original research she had done for her doctorate. He dedicated the work to her, Holloway, his mother, his aunt, and Huntley. It received almost no attention from the rest of the academic community other than a review, written by Byrne herself, under her alternate name Olive Richard in The Journal of Abnormal and Social Psychology.

Emotions of Normal People also elaborated on the DISC Theory. Marston viewed people behaving along two axes, with their attention being either passive or active, depending on the individual's perception of his or her environment as either favorable or antagonistic. By placing the axes at right angles, four quadrants form, with each describing a behavioral pattern:

- Dominance produces activity in an antagonistic environment
- Inducement produces activity in a favorable environment
- Submission produces passivity in a favorable environment
- Compliance produces passivity in an antagonistic environment.

Marston posited that there is a masculine notion of freedom that is inherently anarchic and violent and an opposing feminine notion based on "Love Allure" that leads to an ideal state of submission to loving authority.

== Wonder Woman ==
=== Creation ===
On October 25, 1940, an interview conducted by his partner Olive Byrne (under the pseudonym "Olive Richard") was published in The Family Circle (titled "Don't Laugh at the Comics"), in which Marston said that he saw "great educational potential" in comic books. (A follow-up article was published two years later in 1942.) The interview caught the attention of comics publisher Max Gaines, who hired Marston as an educational consultant for National Periodical Publications and All-American Publications, two of the companies that would later merge to form DC Comics.

In the early 1940s, the DC Comics line was dominated by superpower-endowed male characters such as the Green Lantern and Superman, as well as Batman, with his high-tech gadgets. According to the Fall 2001 issue of the Boston University alumni magazine, it was the idea of Marston's wife, Elizabeth Holloway Marston, to create a female superhero. Marston recommended an idea for a new kind of superhero, one who would conquer not with fists or firepower, but with love. "Fine," said Elizabeth, "but make her a woman."

Marston introduced the idea to Max Gaines, co-founder with Jack Liebowitz of All-American Publications. Given the go-ahead, Marston developed Wonder Woman, basing her character on the unconventional, liberated, powerful modern women of his day. Marston's pseudonym, Charles Moulton, combined his own and Gaines's middle names.

In a 1943 issue of The American Scholar, Marston wrote: "Not even girls want to be girls so long as our feminine archetype lacks force, strength, and power. Not wanting to be girls, they don't want to be tender, submissive, peace-loving as good women are. Women's strong qualities have become despised because of their weakness. The obvious remedy is to create a feminine character with all the strength of Superman plus all the allure of a good and beautiful woman."

In 2017, a majority of Marston's personal papers arrived at the Schlesinger Library at the Radcliffe Institute for Advanced Study at Harvard University; this collection helps to tell the backstory of "Wonder Woman", including his unorthodox personal life with two idealistic and strong women, Olive Byrne and Elizabeth Marston, with a connection to Margaret Sanger, one of the most influential feminists of the twentieth century.

=== Development ===
Marston's character was a native of an all-female utopia of Amazons who became a crime-fighting U.S. government agent, using her superhuman strength and agility, and her ability to force villains to submit and tell the truth by binding them with her magic lasso. Her appearance was believed by some to be based somewhat on Olive Byrne, and her heavy bronze bracelets (which she used to deflect bullets) were inspired by bracelets worn by Byrne.

After her name "Suprema, the Wonder Woman" was replaced with simply "Wonder Woman", which was a popular term at the time that described women who were exceptionally gifted, the character made her debut in All Star Comics #8 in December 1941. Wonder Woman next appeared in Sensation Comics #1 (January 1942), and six months later, Wonder Woman #1 debuted. Except for four months in 1986, the series has been in print ever since. The stories were initially written by Marston and illustrated by newspaper artist Harry Peter. During his life Marston had written many articles and books on various psychological topics, but his last six years of writing were devoted to his comics creation.

== Personal life ==
Marston had two children each with both his wife Elizabeth Holloway Marston and partner Olive Byrne. Elizabeth gave birth to a son, Pete, and a daughter, Olive Ann. Olive Byrne gave birth to two sons. Elizabeth supported the family financially while Olive Byrne stayed home to take care of all four children. Marjorie Wilkes Huntley, who would go on to become an office executive under H. G. Peter, occasionally lived with them.

== Death ==
William Moulton Marston died of cancer on May 2, 1947, in Rye, seven days before his 54th birthday. After his death, Elizabeth and Olive continued to live together until Olive's death in 1990, aged 86; Elizabeth died in 1993, aged 100.

== Legacy ==
In 1985, Marston was posthumously named as one of the honorees by DC Comics in the company's 50th anniversary publication Fifty Who Made DC Great. His contributions to the development of the polygraph are featured in the documentary film The Lie Detector which first aired on American Experience on January 3, 2023.

=== Themes ===
William Moulton Marston's philosophy of diametric opposites has bled into the design of his Wonder Woman mythology. This theme of diametrics took the form of his emphasis of particular masculine and feminine configurations as well as dominance and submission.

Marston's "Wonder Woman" is an early example of bondage themes that were entering popular culture in the 1930s. Physical and mental submission appears again and again throughout Marston's comics work, with Wonder Woman and her criminal opponents frequently being tied up (or otherwise restrained), and her Amazonian sisters engaging in frequent wrestling and bondage play. These elements were softened by later writers of the series, who dropped such characters as the Nazi-like blonde female slaver Eviless completely, despite her having formed the original Villainy Inc. of Wonder Woman's enemies (in Wonder Woman #28, the last by Marston).

Though Marston had described female nature as being more capable of submission emotion, in his other writings and interviews, he referred to submission as a noble practice. He did not shy away from the sexual implications, saying:

The only hope for peace is to teach people who are full of pep and unbound force to enjoy being bound... Only when the control of self by others is more pleasant than the unbound assertion of self in human relationships can we hope for a stable, peaceful human society... Giving to others, being controlled by them, submitting to other people cannot possibly be enjoyable without a strong erotic element.

One of the purposes of these bondage depictions was to induce eroticism in readers as a part of what he called "sex love training." Through his Wonder Woman comics, he aimed to condition readers to become more readily accepting of loving submission to loving authorities rather than being so assertive with their own destructive egos. About male readers, he later wrote: "Give them an alluring woman stronger than themselves to submit to, and they'll be proud to become her willing slaves!"

Marston combined these themes with others, including restorative and transformative justice, rehabilitation, regret, and their roles in civilization. These appeared often in his depiction of the near-ideal Amazon civilization of Paradise Island, and especially its "Reform Island" penal colony, which played a central role in many stories and was the "loving" alternative to retributive justice of the world run by men. These themes are particularly evident in his last story, in which prisoners freed by Eviless, who have responded to Amazonian rehabilitation and now have good dominance/submission, stop her and restore the Amazons to power.

Some of these themes continued on in Silver Age characters, who may have been influenced by Marston, notably Saturn Girl and Saturn Queen, who (like Eviless and her female army) are also from Saturn, are also clad in tight, dark red bodysuits, are also blond or red-haired, and also have telepathic powers.

Wonder Woman's golden Lasso of Truth and in particular one of the Amazon queens' scions of the Girdle of Aphrodite or Venus which Marston first fictionally encountered as Wonder Woman's 'Magic Girdle of Aphrodite' then reaching back to its origin called her Golden Girdle of Gaea, were the focus of many of the early stories and have the same capability to reform people for good in the short term that Transformation Island and prolonged wearing of Venus Girdles offered in the longer term. The Venus Girdle was an allegory for Marston's theory of "sex love" training, where people can be "trained" to embrace submission through eroticism.

== In film ==
Marston's life is depicted in Professor Marston and the Wonder Women, a 2017 biographical drama also portraying Elizabeth Holloway Marston, Olive Byrne, and the creation of Wonder Woman. Marston is portrayed in the film by Welsh actor Luke Evans.

== Bibliography ==
- "Systolic blood pressure symptoms of deception and constituent mental states." (Harvard University, 1921) (doctoral dissertation)
- (1999; originally published 1928) Emotions of Normal People. Taylor & Francis Ltd. ISBN 0-415-21076-3
- (1930) Walter B. Pitkin & William M. Marston, The Art of Sound Pictures. New York: Appleton.
- (1931) ''Integrative Psychology: A Study of Unit Response (with C. Daly King, and Elizabeth Holloway Marston).
- (c. 1932) Venus with us; a tale of the Caesar. New York: Sears.
- (1936) You can be popular. New York: Home Institute.
- (1937) Try living. New York: Crowell.
- (1938) The lie detector test. New York: Smith.
- (1941) March on! Facing life with courage. New York: Doubleday, Doran.
- (1943) F.F. Proctor, vaudeville pioneer (with J.H. Feller). New York: Smith.

Journal articles

- (1917) "Systolic blood pressure symptoms of deception." Journal of Experimental Psychology, Vol 2(2), 117–163.
- (1920) "Reaction time symptoms of deception." Journal of Experimental Psychology, 3, 72–87.
- (1921) "Psychological Possibilities in the Deception Tests." Journal of Criminal Law & Criminology, 11, 551–570.
- (1923) "Sex Characteristics of Systolic Blood Pressure Behavior." Journal of Experimental Psychology, 6, 387–419.
- (1924) "Studies in Testimony." Journal of Criminal Law & Criminology, 15, 5–31.
- (1924) "A Theory of Emotions and Affection Based Upon Systolic Blood Pressure Studies." American Journal of Psychology, 35, 469–506.
- (1925) "Negative type reaction-time symptoms of deception." Psychological Review, 32, 241–247.
- (1926) "The psychonic theory of consciousness." Journal of Abnormal and Social Psychology, 21, 161–169.
- (1927) "Primary emotions." Psychological Review, 34, 336–363.
- (1927) "Consciousness, motation, and emotion." Psyche, 29, 40–52.
- (1927) "Primary colors and primary emotions." Psyche, 30, 4–33.
- (1927) "Motor consciousness as a basis for emotion." Journal of Abnormal and Social Psychology, 22, 140–150.
- (1928) "Materialism, vitalism and psychology." Psyche, 8, 15–34.
- (1929) "Bodily symptoms of elementary emotions." Psyche, 10, 70–86.
- (1929) "The psychonic theory of consciousness—an experimental study," (with C.D. King). Psyche, 9, 39–5.
- (1938) "'You might as well enjoy it.'" Rotarian, 53, No. 3, 22–25.
- (1938) "What people are for." Rotarian, 53, No. 2, 8–10.
- (1944) "Why 100,000,000 Americans read comics." The American Scholar, 13 (1), 35–44.
- (1944) "Women can out-think men!" Ladies Home Journal, 61 (May), 4–5.
- (1947) "Lie detection's bodily basis and test procedures," in: P.L. Harriman (Ed.), Encyclopedia of Psychology, New York, 354–363.
- Entries on "Consciousness," "Defense mechanisms," and "Synapse" in the 1929 edition of the Encyclopædia Britannica.

== See also ==
- Hugo Münsterberg, Marston's academic advisor

Preceded by None	Wonder Woman writer 1941–1947	Succeeded by Robert Kanigher
