= H. G. Peter =

American newspaper illustrator and cartoonist

- (l to r) William Moulton Marston, H. G. Peter, Sheldon Mayer, Max Gaines (1942)
- Born: Harry George Peter; March 8, 1880 San Rafael, California, U.S.
- Died: January 2, 1958 (aged 77) New York City, U.S.
- Area: Penciller
- Pseudonym: H. G. Peter
- Notable works: Wonder Woman

Harry George Peter (March 8, 1880 – January 2, 1958) was an American newspaper illustrator and cartoonist known as the co-creator of Wonder Woman comic book and for Bud Fisher of the San Francisco Chronicle.

== Biography ==
Harry George Peter was born in San Rafael, California, in 1880, the third of three children. Parents Louis and Louisa Peter were born in France, and his father worked as a tailor. At the age of twenty he drew newspaper illustrations under the name H. G. Peter, while answering to the nicknames "Harry" or "Pete". Working for the San Francisco Chronicle, he met Adonica Fulton, a staff artist for the San Francisco Bulletin who had studied at the Mark Hopkins Institute of Art. After moving to New York together in 1907, their pen-and-ink stye illustration, influenced by Charles Dana Gibson, earned them editorial work from magazines like the New York American and Judge. In 1912 they married.

His first work for comic books was through Lloyd Jacquet's comic shop, Funnies, Inc., where he illustrated such features as the biography of General George C. Marshall in True Comics #4 (September 1941). His first superhero was Man o' Metal in "Reg'lar Fellers Heroic Comics" (July, 1941).

His most lasting work came when the 61-year-old artist drew William Moulton Marston's Amazonian superheroine Wonder Woman (even though Peter went on to be uncredited in her creation) beginning in October 1941. Peter notably changed his Gibson technique to an Art Nouveau-influenced cartooning style for the new series. In April 1942, he opened his own studio at 130 W. 42nd Street in Manhattan. In March 1944, the success of the Wonder Woman comics and newspaper strip led to the opening of the Marston Art Studio at 331 Madison Avenue at 43rd Street. The fourteenth floor studio, one floor above Marston's office, was run by office executive Marjorie Wilkes Huntley, who also contributed some inking and lettering. Joye Hummel went from being Marston's assistant to writing full scripts for the comic, the only other writer for Wonder Woman during the Golden Age. While Peter pencilled the stories, covers, and strips and inked the main figures, he was assisted by a series of female commercial artists who did background inking. The staff also included Helen Schepens as colorist, and Jim and Margaret Wroten as letterers, with some lettering done by daughter-in-law, Louise Marston.

Although Marston died in 1947, Peter continued with Wonder Woman until his death. Peter died in Staten Island, New York City, in 1958.

== Legacy ==
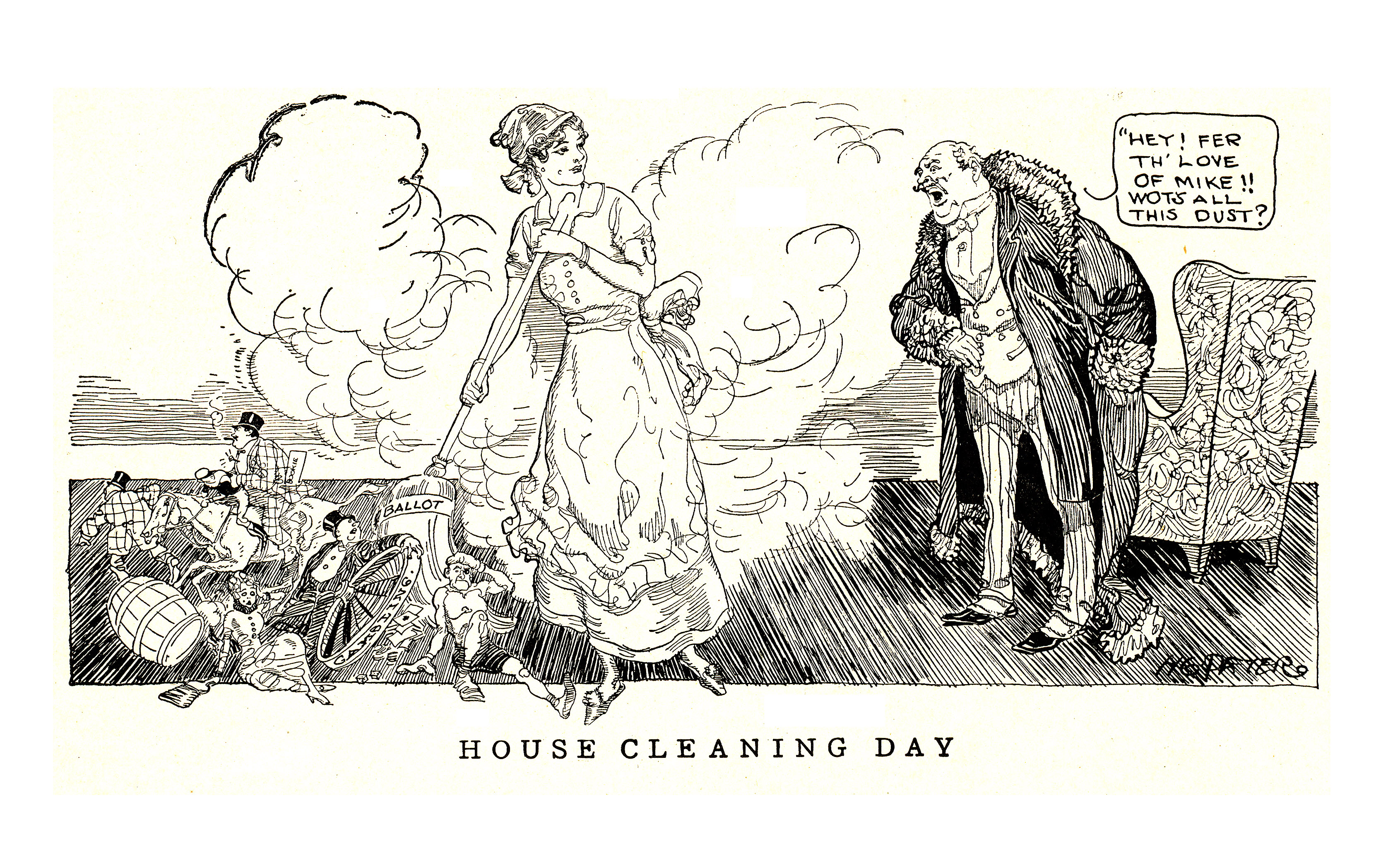
Cartoon by H. G. Peter, Judge Magazine, Feb. 6, 1915.

Marston and Peter were peers and supporters of the suffragettes and feminists of the early 20th century. Marston — an extended family member to birth control activists Margaret Sanger and Ethel Byrne — often wrote, lectured, and taught in favor of equality for women, and Peter and his wife Adonica Fulton often drew editorial cartoons in supportive magazines, such as Judge, which featured "The Modern Woman" page from 1912 to 1917. Marston stated that he felt the intention of their work was a "psychological propaganda for the new type of woman who, I believe, should rule the world."

In 1972, Ms. magazine compiled a hardcover collection reprinting the Golden Age Wonder Woman stories of Marston and Peter. Gloria Steinem selected the stories and wrote of them, "Wonder Woman symbolizes many of the values of the women's culture that Feminists are now trying to introduce into the mainstream: strength and self-reliance for women; sisterhood and mutual support among women; peacefulness and esteem for human life; a diminishment both of 'masculine' aggression and of the belief that violence is the only way of solving conflicts." Wonder Woman was also on the premiere issue cover of Ms. Magazine (January 1972) with the blurb "Wonder Woman for President", a direct reference to the "Wonder Woman For President" cover of Wonder Woman #7 (Spring 1943) by Marston and Peter. This was repeated and updated for the 40th anniversary issue in 2012. During this influential period, DC Comics also returned Wonder Woman's costume, powers, and Amazon heritage in a focus closer to her 1940s beginnings.

The 1975 TV series The New Adventures of Wonder Woman reflected the Ms. book's influence directly, setting itself in the World War II era, and basing the animated opening credits on H.G. Peter panels reprinted in the collection.

Trina Robbins became the first woman to officially draw Wonder Woman with her 1986 mini-series, The Legend of Wonder Woman. Its visual style and storytelling are a direct homage to H.G. Peter and Marston.

The cover to Wonder Woman #184 (vol. 2, October 2002) by Adam Hughes depicts his modern Wonder Woman meeting the H.G. Peter Wonder Woman of the 1940s.

The book The Secret History of Wonder Woman (Knopf, 2014) by Harvard historian Jill Lepore featured a panel of Wonder Woman by H.G. Peter on its cover.

Preceded by None	Wonder Woman artist 1941–1958	Succeeded by Ross Andru
