= List of Wonder Woman enemies =

This is a list of fictional characters from DC Comics who are or have been enemies of Wonder Woman.

== Central rogues gallery ==
In alphabetical order (with issue and date of first appearance and when or if they were involved in Villainy Incorporated, a league of Wonder Woman rivals founded by Eviless, in which at one time or another most major Wonder Woman villains were involved).

Villain	First appearance	Description
Angle Man	Wonder Woman #70 (November/December 1954)	Originally a clever schemer who "knew all the angles" known as Angelo Bend, the updated Angle Man possesses an object known as an Angler which can alter objects and locations according to the holder's wishes, sometimes defying gravity or through teleportation. The Angle Man was created as a recurring foil for Wonder Woman during the 1950s and 1960s.
Ares	Wonder Woman #1 (summer 1942)	Ares, referred to by the Roman name Mars for most of the pre-Crisis period, is the God of War and son of the Greek god Zeus. In post-Crisis continuity, Ares had plotted to start World War III, which led to Diana becoming Wonder Woman. In The New 52, Ares is mostly referred to as War and, in a major departure from the character's longstanding history as one of Wonder Woman's archenemies, is re-imagined as a benign supporting character. Post-DC Rebirth Ares returns to a more antagonistic role but is still less malevolent than his Golden Age incarnation.
Blue Snowman	Sensation Comics #59 (September 1946)	Byrna Brilyant is a small town teacher and scientist who uses her late father's invention of "blue snow" for self-gain. Byrna disguised herself and unleashed the petrifying power of the blue snow upon the farming community of Fair Weather Valley, demanding each farmer's "life savings" in return for the chemical antidote that will free the crops, livestock, and people from the snow's effects. She was discovered in her mountain sanctuary by Wonder Woman, who forces her to defrost the valley. She later joined the first Villainy Inc. as they attempted to take over Paradise Island. The variety of gadgets at her disposal include a "telescopic snow ray" that can create petrifying blizzards, a "defroster ray" for reverse effects, a hat that produces blue snow, and a smoking pipe that projects icicles. She also controls an army of robots attuned to her brainwaves.
Cheetah	Wonder Woman #6 (October 1943)	The original Cheetah, Priscilla Rich, was a beautiful debutante and philanthropist who developed an odd sort of split personality when she felt overshadowed by Wonder Woman.
Cheetah	Wonder Woman #274 (December 1980)	A second Pre-Crisis Cheetah, Deborah Domaine, the niece of the original, was an ecologist; she was kidnapped, brainwashed into a feral eco-terrorist, and trained in unarmed combat by Kobra. Post-Crisis, Deborah never became the Cheetah.
Cheetah	Wonder Woman (vol. 2) #7 (August 1987) (as Barbara Ann Minerva); #8 (as the Cheetah)	The current Cheetah, Barbara Ann Minerva, is a former archeologist and treasure-hunter who sold her soul to the plant-god Urtzkartaga for power and immortality, not realizing she would be bound in eternal servitude to him. She, aside from Circe and Ares, is arguably Wonder Woman's deadliest archenemy. Post-DC Rebirth Barbara Ann was a close friend and mentor to Wonder Woman before being tricked into becoming the Cheetah by the Children of Ares.
Cheetah	Wonder Woman (vol. 2) #171 (August 2001)	Minerva briefly lost her power to Argentine businessman Sebastian Ballesteros, who became Circe's consort and funded the transformation of Vanessa Kapatelis into the Silver Swan. He lost the Cheetah power in a deadly battle with Minerva and later was found slain by Minerva after having abducted Kapatelis and again transforming her into the Silver Swan.
Circe	Wonder Woman #37 (September/October 1949)	Circe is based on the Greek mythological character of the same name. A witch and sorceress of vast power, specializing in illusion and transformation spells, Circe became one of Wonder Woman's most formidable foes in the Post-Crisis DC continuity, and even triggered a War of the Gods and later made herself the Goddess of Magic.
Deimos	Wonder Woman #183 (August 1969)	Deimos is the God of Dread and the son of Ares and Aphrodite. He planned to ignite a war between the United States and the Soviet Union, though his plans were thwarted by Wonder Woman. After the events of DC Rebirth, Deimos and his brother Phobos took the appearance of handsome twins and plotted to find Themyscira so that they could free their father Ares. Their actions led to the formation of Godwatch.
Devastation	Wonder Woman (vol. 2) #143 (April 1999)	The Titan known as Cronus created Devastation much the same way Wonder Woman was created: by having life breathed into a clay female figure. With his Titan children each blessing her with dark gifts, she is Cronus' champion who he hopes will defeat Olympus' champion: Wonder Woman. With almost the same powers, this demigoddess is almost an exact copy of Wonder Woman, save for the dark twist behind her powers.
Doctor Cyber	Wonder Woman #179 (November–December 1968)	A female criminal mastermind and head of an international crime syndicate, Doctor Cyber was Wonder Woman's nemesis during a period when she had given up her Amazon powers and become a white-costumed karate expert. During an early battle, Cyber's face was horribly burned. Vowing revenge for her ruined beauty, she became obsessed with having Wonder Woman's face removed and surgically grafted on her own. She also teamed up with Batman foe Doctor Moon in this period. Post-DC Rebirth, Doctor Cyber is an AI clone of Veronica Cale's deceased assistant, Adrianna Anderson, and became a member of the organization Godwatch.
Doctor Poison	Sensation Comics #2 (February 1942)	Princess Maru became Doctor Poison who, disguising her gender via a bulky hooded costume and mask, was the leader of a Nazi spy ring whose ultimate goal was to wreak havoc by contaminating the Army's water with "reverso", a drug that caused people to do the opposite of what they are told.
Doctor Poison	Wonder Woman (vol. 2) #151 (December 1999)	In recent years, an unnamed granddaughter of the original Doctor Poison appears in league with Devastation, Villainy Inc., and the Secret Society of Super Villains. Having used herself as a subject for biochemical experiments, she has developed the ability to secrete various toxins and chemicals.
Doctor Psycho	Wonder Woman #5 (June–July 1943)	Ridiculed as a child for his small stature and strange appearance, Doctor Psycho grew up to be highly sexist and misogynistic. Formerly a brilliant student, he went mad and turned to crime after being framed for a crime by a rival who stole the only girl he ever loved. A little person with occultic abilities, he originally was intended to be an archetypical mad scientist and medium, but that image was dropped Post-Crisis. He is one of Wonder Woman's deadliest foes.
Duke of Deception	Wonder Woman #2 (fall 1942)	A servant of the evil god Mars from his base on the planet Mars, he embodied deceit, confusion and treachery, using his godlike powers of illusion, shapeshifting and influencing minds to further the cause of war. One of Wonder Woman's most persistent foes, he plagued her throughout the Golden, Silver and Bronze Ages. Little is known about the true history of the Duke of Deception. He appears to be a minor god who existed for thousands of years, drafted by Mars to battle Wonder Woman. He uses his powers to spread falsehoods to provoke humanity into conflict and war, and played a major role in the Golden Age origin of another notable Wonder Woman villain, Doctor Psycho. Post-Rebirth, the Duke of Deception has been reimagined as Dolus, a Roman personification of Deception.
Eris	Wonder Woman #183 (August 1969)	The Goddess of Discord and one of the Children of Ares in the Pre-Flashpoint continuity, where she was known as Eris. She used the Golden Apples of Discord to cause chaos in the United Nations. She was eventually slain by the Son of Vulcan, though she was revived at one point by her brother Phobos and possessed the body of Poison Ivy. In The New 52, Eris was called Strife and was Diana's half-sister through Zeus; she is portrayed as sarcastic and a heavy drinker.
Giganta	Wonder Woman #9 (June 1944)	Giganta was originally a gorilla who was super-evolved into a woman by Professor Zool. Her modern day version is Doctor Doris Zuel, a medical doctor suffering from a fatal disease who hoped to transfer her life essence into Wonder Woman. When Wonder Girl foiled her attempt, her essence was placed into a gorilla. She then transferred her essence into Olga, a circus strongwoman. Post-Crisis, she has the power to grow to gigantic size.
Maxwell Lord	Justice League #1 (May 1987)	An evil businessman with mind control powers. Initially only a Justice League villain, Lord manipulated Superman to attack Batman and Wonder Woman during Infinite Crisis; she found that the only way to stop him was to kill him and snapped his neck, causing her to become wanted for a time. He later returned as a personal adversary to Wonder Woman, during Blackest Night, when came back to life as a Black Lantern with the sole goal of seeking revenge on her.
Medusa	Superman's Girl Friend, Lois Lane #52 (October 1964)	Based on the legendary Gorgon from Greek mythology, Medusa is known for her ability to turn anyone who looks into her eyes to stone. She was killed by Wonder Woman, but resurrected by her sisters, Euryale and Stheno, only to be killed once again by the Amazon. In The New 52, Medusa once again returned and battled Wonder Woman and Batwoman. Post-Rebirth, Medusa was purified by Nubia and invited to live peacefully on Themyscira.
Paula von Gunther	Sensation Comics #4 (April 1942)	Wonder Woman's first recurring nemesis, Paula von Gunther is a German baroness, ruthless Nazi spymaster, evil scientist, and femme fatale. Blackmailed into serving the Nazis because they held her daughter prisoner, she changed sides after Wonder Woman rescued her daughter, Gerta, and joined the Amazons as their chief scientist. Pre-Crisis, Paula von Gunther had standard Amazon powers, such as superhuman strength capable of breaking chains, leaping great heights and speed and stamina enough to deflect bullets and other projectiles from her Amazon bracelets. She was also a skilled hand-to-hand combatant. Post-Crisis, von Gunther was empowered when possessed by the Dark Angel, who had vast powers, and was able to perform a variety of feats including mind control, altering her size, teleportation and altering the time stream. Post-DC Rebirth, Paula von Gunther was a descendant to the Valkyries who was taken from Neo-Nazi parents by Wonder Woman when she was a child. Upon discovering her heritage, she adopted the name the Warmaster and formed the Four Horsewomen from Wonder Woman's other enemies to kill the Amazons, but she was defeated and reformed by Wonder Woman.
Phobos	Wonder Woman #183 (August 1969)	The God of Fear and the son of Ares and Aphrodite. Phobos’ jealous desire to win the approval of his father led him to create the nightmarish demon Decay, one of the first overt threats the Post-Crisis Wonder Woman faced after leaving her home on the island of Themyscira. He would go on to make multiple appearances as a foil for Wonder Woman, such as in 1988's Wonder Woman (volume 2) #23-24, in which he teamed with the Gorgon Euryale and the colossal Ixion the Assassin. He would resurface later as a key figure in DC Comics' 1992 company-wide crossover event The War of the Gods, this time allying himself with Eris (who, in the Post-Crisis continuity, is presented as his sister) and the sorceress Circe in a treacherous plot to kill Ares. After the events of DC Rebirth, Phobos and his brother Deimos appear as handsome twins.
Queen Clea	Wonder Woman #8 (March 1944)	Cruel ruler of the Atlantean city of Venturia, where women were large, strong and powerful and men were stunted, weak and servile, Queen Clea often forced her subjects to battle in gladiatorial combat. Wanting to take over all of Atlantis, she eventually stole the trident of Poseidon to make herself supremely powerful. She was stopped by Wonder Woman and later joined Villainy Inc. in an attempt at revenge. As an Atlantean, Queen Clea can breathe both above and under water. Clea can also physically withstand the great amounts of undersea depth pressures. Because of this, her body is resistant to most physical injury and provides a form of super strength. When in possession of the mystical trident belonging to Poseidon, Clea's strength levels increase and she has limited control over water. The trident also has the ability to fire force blasts. Due to a spell by the witch Circe, Clea now also has the ability of flight.
Silver Swan	Wonder Woman #288 (February 1982)	Pre-Crisis, Helen Alexandros was a homely ballerina passed up for roles until she struck a bargain with her ancestor, the war-god Mars: power and beauty in exchange for killing Wonder Woman. She had great strength, the ability to fly, and a powerful sonic scream.
Silver Swan	Wonder Woman (vol. 2) #15 (April 1988)	Post-Crisis, Valerie Beaudry was deformed by her parents' exposure to radiation, but had nascent abilities to control sound. Industrialist Henry Armbruster seduced and even married her to convince her to submit to experiments that enhanced her sonic powers and transformed her into a beautiful woman. However, she remained insecure and emotionally dominated by Armbruster, who used her as a weapon against Wonder Woman.
Silver Swan	Wonder Woman (vol. 2) #171 (August 2001)	A third Silver Swan, Vanessa Kapatelis, was actually a longtime friend of Wonder Woman, kidnapped by Circe, Doctor Psycho and others, brainwashed into hating her former idol, and turned into a murderous cyborg. Post-DC Rebirth, Kapatelis is once again transformed into the Silver Swan after her mother, Julia's, death, although she is later reformed by Wonder Woman.
Veronica Cale	Wonder Woman (vol. 2) #196 (November 2003)	Scientific genius and part owner of Cale-Anderson Pharmaceuticals, Veronica Cale has made it her goal to destroy Wonder Woman. Her reasoning is that Wonder Woman was handed many privileges in life, whereas Veronica had to work hard for everything she has accomplished. Along the way, she has worked with other enemies of Wonder Woman, such as Doctor Psycho and Circe. Post -DC Rebirth Cale only becomes an enemy of Wonder Woman after the Children of Ares force her to by holding her daughter hostage.

== Other recurring antagonists ==
In chronological order (with issue and date of first appearance), separated by those with multiple appearances and those that appeared in only one issue or story.

=== Multiple appearances ===
==== Golden Age ====
Villain	First appearance	Description
Earl of Greed	Wonder Woman #2 (September 1942)	One of Mars' main lieutenants, he managed to manipulate power-hungry men with hopes of greed and selfishness.
Count of Conquest, a.k.a. Lord Conquest	Wonder Woman #2 (September 1942)	One of Mars' main lieutenants.
Blakfu	Wonder Woman #4 (April–May 1943)	The king of the Mole Men, a race of cave-dwellers that resemble moles.
Mavis	Wonder Woman #4 (April–May 1943)	A slave of Baroness Paula von Gunther, she seized control of von Gunther's Nazi spy operation after von Gunther's reformation. Cunning, deadly, and determined to take revenge on both von Gunther and Wonder Woman, she stole the invisible plane and used it for aerial sabotage, kidnapped von Gunther's daughter Gerta, strapped Wonder Woman to a bomb and later escaped Transformation Island.
Fausta Grables	Comics Cavalcade #2 (spring 1943)	A renowned German athlete and Nazi operative, her first and only appearance was in the spring 1943 issue of Comics Cavalcade titled "Wanted by Hitler: Dead or Alive". A version of the character appeared in the 1970s Wonder Woman TV series, portrayed by Lynda Day George in the 1976 episode "Fausta: The Nazi Wonder Woman". Another version of the character appeared in the 2017 film Wonder Woman, portrayed by Rachel Pickup.
Zara	Comic Cavalcade #5 (December 1943)	Leader of the so-called Cult of the Crimson Flame, Zara is a skilled pyrotechnics expert who was sold into slavery as a child and developed a misanthropic outlook as a result. She uses the cult's symbol, an eerie "crimson flame" that appears out of nowhere at her behest, hanging suspended in mid-air and inscribing mysterious flaming messages to cow the members of the cult - the so-called "flame slaves" - into abject obedience. She later escaped from Transformation Island, which was meant to rehabilitate female criminals, along with seven other villainesses and formed the first incarnation of Villainy Inc. to seek revenge against Wonder Woman. Post-DC Rebirth, Zara is a powerful pyrokinetic recruited by Veronica Cale as an agent of Godwatch and sent to battle Wonder Woman.
Eviless	Wonder Woman #10 (fall 1944)	Hailing from the planet Saturn (later retconned as a subatomic Earthlike world near or within Saturn), Eviless was a slave driver who tried to invade Earth with fellow Saturnian Duke Mephisto Saturno and battled Wonder Woman. She does not appear to have any superpowers, but she could skillfully use a whip to control her subjects. She could also put herself into a deathlike trance at will by stopping her heartbeat, which she used to stage her escape from Transformation Island, and managed to steal Wonder Woman's Golden Lasso in the process. After taking control of a guard using the lasso, she freed several prisoners from Transformation Island and banded them together as Villainy Inc. The team was unsuccessful against Wonder Woman despite kidnapping her mother, and were defeated and captured. Her Golden Age race of aggressive ultra-rational Saturnian telepaths, however, may have inspired the DC Silver Age characters Saturn Girl and Saturn Queen, who strongly resemble Eviless in body and hair style, costume, powers and planet(s) of origin. Post-DC Rebirth, Eviless is reimagined as Saturna, a necromancer and leader of the criminal organization known as the Crimson Men.
Hypnota	Wonder Woman #11 (winter 1944–1945)	A stage magician who disguised herself as a man, Hypnota was accidentally shot in the head during a rehearsal for her stage show. Treating the gunshot wound with an experimental surgery saved her life, but also gave her the ability to use "Blue Electric Rays of Dominance" emanating from her "Mid-Brain". She later became a member of Eviless's Villainy, Inc., which consisted of Wonder Woman's primary female antagonists. Post-Crisis, Hypnota was renamed the Hypnotic Woman and was a member in the first incarnation of Villainy, Inc.
Draska Nishki	Sensation Comics #42 (April 1945)	Crafty spy-for-hire and extortionist who also attempted to escape trial by binding Wonder Woman in her own magic lasso. Appeared in both the Golden and Silver Ages.
Dalma	Comic Cavalcade #12 (fall 1945)	A rebellious Amazon who left Paradise Island to travel to Man's World on her own. Without her bracelets intact, she lost her intelligence and became an angry brute. Wonder Woman defeated her and restored her Amazonian spirit.
Gundra	Comic Cavalcade #17 (October 1946)	Occasionally referred to as Gudra, Gundra was a Nazi Valkyrie who Wonder Woman battled to retrieve Steve Trevor from Valhalla. Post-Rebirth, the ancestor of super-villain Paula von Gunther and the last surviving Valkyrie, Gudra was once married to Wonder Woman's Asgardian friend, Siegfried, mythical dragonslayer of Norse and Germanic myth. She has since made sporadic appearances throughout Wonder Woman's history.
Queen Atomia	Wonder Woman #21 (January/February 1947)	Queen of a subatomic universe who attempted to take over the world.
The Mask	Wonder Woman #24 (July/August 1947)	Nina Close, frail and oppressed wife of a billionaire industrialist, developed a split personality patterned after bold explorer Fancy Framer and went on an insane rampage to extort millions from her husband and the U.S. government. She stole Wonder Woman's invisible plane and trapped people in S/M-style masks that would release poisonous hydro-cyano gas if removed improperly.
Badra	Comic Cavalcade #25 (February/March 1948)	Refugee from the ruined planet of Hator, Badra was a super-powerful thief who could fly faster than light.
Minister Blizzard	Wonder Woman #29 (March 1948)	Prime Minister to the hidden kingdom of Iceberg Land, inhabited by cold-loving "snow people" and ruled by the kind-hearted Princess Snowina. Minister Blizzard used various devices to freeze both items and people and plotted to seize control of the kingdom and take over the world. Post-Crisis, he is a radical environmentalist bent on invoking another Ice Age.
Inventa	Wonder Woman #33 (January 1949)	A brilliant Amazon genius who plotted to take over Paradise Island. With her henchwoman Torcha, she forced Wonder Woman to complete her impossible trials known as the Four Dooms, but was defeated.
Nuclear	Wonder Woman #43 (September/October 1950)	A dissolute heir who had his name changed legally to match his gossip column moniker "Percy Playboy," Nuclear created machinery in an underground lair that empowered him to seize Navy ships magnetically. His first published appearance referred to a previously unpublished adventure, which was later told in All-Star Squadron #16.

==== Silver Age ====
Villain	First appearance	Description
Professor Menace	Wonder Woman #111 (January 1960)	Evil scientist who creates a super strong robot duplicate of Wonder Woman controlled by his brain impulses; later aids several JLA rogues in creating explosive robots (JLA #5), but is captured by the Green Arrow with the other members.
Image-Maker	Wonder Woman #134 (November 1962)	Master of the ultra-dimensional Mirror World, who draws Wonder Woman into his dimension and pits her against mirror duplicates of herself as a test of his powers in preparation for an invasion of Earth.
The Human Fireworks	Wonder Woman #141 (October 1963)	An unidentified crook applied chemical experiments to himself and became the Human Fireworks, a malleable energy-generating being who could fly and generate dazzling explosive bursts similar to fireworks.
Mouse Man	Wonder Woman #141 (October 1963)	One of Wonder Woman's more bizarre villains. Permanently reduced to a height of about six inches through chemical experiments, Mouse Man used his small size and his ability to control mice and other vermin to stage elaborate crimes.
Hera	Sea Devils #14 (November–December 1963)	Queen of the Gods and wife to Zeus. While often a neutral figure, Hera has crossed paths with Wonder Woman on a handful of occasions, most recently joining the Wizard in killing Zeus in attempt to rule Mount Olympus herself.
Sarge Steel	Sarge Steel #1 (December 1964)	A government agent and spy, Sarge Steel served as head of the Department of Metahuman Affairs. Wonder Woman joined the group under her "Diana Prince" alias, and worked with Steel for some time, though he was unaware of her alter ego. Much later, Sarge Steel helped establish A.X.E. (Amazon Extradition Entity) to forcibly remove all Amazons from the United States.
Egg Fu	Wonder Woman #157 (October 1965)	A large Chinese Communist egg who controlled large armies in Communist China to try to destroy the American way of life and seek power and conquest. Pre-Crisis, he used his mustache as a weapon.
Paper Man	Wonder Woman #165 (October 1966)	Wiry, put-upon Horace (last name unknown) worked at a chemical plant making special paper of interest to military intelligence when, struck by an act of kindness from Diana Prince, he fell into a vat and was transformed into a flat, sentient piece of paper. He used his power to manipulate his shape, becoming a paper airplane, a ball of paper, and even a blow pipe capable of blowing a hole through a dam, all to steal gifts for the object of his obsession — Diana Prince.
Crimson Centipede	Wonder Woman #169 (March 1967)	Another bizarre Kanigher creation, the Crimson Centipede was a super-powerful entity created by the God of War as a foil for Wonder Woman. Staged burglaries to fund widespread criminal enterprises to destabilize Man's World and counter the peaceful influences of Wonder Woman. Originally depicted as a human with multiple limbs, the Crimson Centipede is reimagined as an insectoid creature following DC Rebirth.
Them!	Wonder Woman #185 (November 1969)	The trio known as Them! were an all-girl gang of violent New York hippies named Top Hat, Moose Momma, and Pinto. They ruled a certain section of town and terrorized a girl named Cathy Perkins, who eventually turned to Wonder Woman for help. Known for their masculine clothing, they had a penchant for beating people and forcing them to wear dog collars.
Morgana	Wonder Woman #186 (February 1970)	The daughter of sorceress Morgaine le Fey, accidentally summoned by teenagers dabbling in black magic. More mischievous and temperamental than evil, Morgana used her magic to create chaos before Diana's friend I Ching banished her back to her own world.
Lu Shan	Wonder Woman #187 (April 1970)	The daughter of Diana Prince's mentor I Ching, Lu Shan believed that he was responsible for her mother's death. Lu Shan served Doctor Cyber's plot to build "earthquakers" that would level Hong Kong as a demonstration of power to blackmail the world.

==== Bronze Age ====
Villain	First appearance	Description
Red Panzer	Wonder Woman #228 (February 1977)	Nazi Helmut Streicher donned body armor and fought Wonder Woman during World War II on Earth-Two and also fought Wonder Woman of Earth-One when he got displaced there during the same appearance. The armor survived the war and has been worn by three modern successors of Streicher, including one who became a foe of Troia.
Osira	Wonder Woman #231 (May 1977)	An alien, Osira crash landed in ancient Egypt centuries ago and attempted to bring peace to the planet, using her vast telepathic powers to dominate mankind. After a time, some of the locals succeeded in trapping her in a pyramid in Egypt for many centuries, but she was accidentally freed in modern times. She attempted to reestablish her control over the world, but was stopped by Wonder Woman.
Armageddon	Wonder Woman #234 (August 1977)	A Nazi mastermind who used advanced technology, such as boots that enabled him to stomp powerful vibrations and a toxin that turned men into mindless berserker-type ogre-resembling creatures he called Muutorrs. Post-Crisis, he fought Hippolyta as Wonder Woman and Diana, who had traveled back in time and disguised herself as Miss America.
Baron Blitzkrieg	World's Finest #246 (August/September 1977)	Baron Blitzkrieg was originally an especially vicious German Army officer who was blinded and disfigured when a concentration camp prisoner threw a bottle in his face. German scientists restored his sight, but not his appearance. So they experimented on Blitzkrieg, giving him superhuman strength, optical energy beams, and the ability to fly. However, each of these abilities were manifested one at a time; only with training was he able to incorporate them together.
Kung	Wonder Woman #237 (November 1977)	A martial arts master with the ability to transform into animals, Kung was an assassin in the service of World War II Japan. Wonder Woman thwarted his attempt to kill Dwight D. Eisenhower.
Inversion the Inside-Out Man	Wonder Woman #247 (September 1978)	Inversion was a scientist trying to invent a teleporter but was horribly disfigured, with his organs twisted to the outside of his body, after testing it on himself. Mad, he attempted to force Wonder Woman to adapt the JLA satellite's teleporter system to inflict the same state on the rest of the world. Post-DC Rebirth, Inversion was a criminal that Wonder Woman had defeated before, and attacked her once again as she visited her friend the Mayfly.
Astarte the Empress of the Silver Snake	Wonder Woman #252 (February 1979)	Menacing space villain who turned out to be the restless spirit of Hippolyta's sister Diana, for whom Wonder Woman was named, who could not pass over into the realm of the dead until she acknowledged her death.
Astarte the Empress of the Silver Snake	Wonder Woman (vol. 3) #42 (May 2010)	An Amazon kidnapped and driven insane by a nomadic alien nation called the Citizenry, Astarte became their leader and supervised their development of highly advanced technology, including radical genetic modification tools that turned selected members of the Citizenry (including Astarte's daughter Theana) into superhuman warriors, as they plundered planets for natural resources.
Hyperion	New Teen Titans #11 (September 1981)	An ancient sun titan who Eros used to battle Wonder Woman.
Captain Wonder	Wonder Woman #289 (March 1982)	Doctor Psycho's sinister creation from Steve Trevor's mind. Built out of ectoplasm from the spirit world, Doctor Psycho inhabits this body to combat Wonder Woman.
Adjudicator	Wonder Woman #291 (May 1982)	Powerful alien android who set himself the task of judging the worth of the continued existence of many planets, including Earth; used Four Horseman of Death, Famine, War, and Pestilence in tests of various parallel Earths.
Hecate	Superman Family #218 (May 1982)	The Goddess of Witchcraft. Once Hades' wife, she was spurned by her husband after he took Persephone as his new bride. Hera, resentful of Hecate, prevented any of the other gods from giving aid to the moon goddess. Insulted, Hecate desired revenge and provided her great power to the sorceress Circe. In The New 52, Hecate is a serpentine goddess who helped the Amazons create Donna Troy to defeat Wonder Woman.
Aegeus	Wonder Woman #297 (November 1982)	Leader of a cell of Greek terrorists, Nikos Aegeus was granted enhanced strength, mystical lightning that can destroy or teleport, and winged steed Pegasus by Bellerophon to destroy the Amazons. He later picked up the daggers of Vulcan, which could slice through even Wonder Woman's bracelets. In The New 52, Aegeus is a young man attempting to steal the title of the "God of War" from Wonder Woman.
Tezcatlipoca	Wonder Woman #313 (March 1984)	The Aztec trickster god was first the unseen consort of Circe who then betrayed the sorceress. Creating unrest in the fictional country Tropidor, Tezcatlipoca was also responsible for enslaving a lost tribe of Amazons.
Hades	Wonder Woman #329 (February 1986)	The God of the Underworld. While not truly a malevolent entity, he has clashed with Wonder Woman on numerous occasions due to a mutual conflict in interests, an example being the number of occasions where Wonder Woman journeyed to his realm to retrieve a deceased person or prisoner of Hades.

==== Post-Crisis ====
Villain	First appearance	Description
Decay	Wonder Woman (vol. 2) #3 (April 1987)	Using the remains of the dead Gorgon Medusa, Phobos created Decay as an adversary to Wonder Woman. Possessing the power to physically destroy any substance that she touches, Decay attempted to destroy the Lasso of Truth, but was destroyed in the process.
Cottus	Wonder Woman (vol. 2) #10 (November 1987)	One of the Hekatoncheires, the Cottus resided within Themyscira, deep within Doom's Doorway. He was encountered by Steve Trevor's mother, Diana Trevor, who became a hero among the Amazons for shooting the beast and wounding it.
Echidna	Wonder Woman (vol. 2) #11 (December 1987)	Also known as the Mother of All Monsters, Echidna was among the several monsters trapped beneath Themyscira. During the Challenge of the Gods, Echidna posed as Wonder Woman's friend Julia Kapatelis, leading her into a trap. After a lengthy battle, Wonder Woman beheaded Echidna with her greataxe.
Mikos	Wonder Woman (vol. 2) #17 (June 1988)	A bestiamorph and one of Circe's most trusted allies. With the ability to transform into a raven, Mikos served as Circe's spy. He was killed by Circe after failing to deliver her a message from Doctor Psycho during the War of the Gods.
Cronus	Wonder Woman (vol. 2) #18 (July 1988)	One of the Titans of Myth and father to the villains Arch, Disdain, Harrier, Oblivion, Slaughter and Titan. He eventually bestowed his powers onto Devastation, creating her as a dark mirror to Wonder Woman. During the Godwar, Cronus managed to defeat both the Greek and Hindu pantheons. However, Wonder Woman restored the gods and ambushed Cronus and his children as they attacked Heaven. Cronus attempted to summon enough power to kill the gods, but it resulted in his own death.
Euryale	Wonder Woman (vol. 2) #23 (December 1988)	A Gorgon and sister to Medusa and Stheno, she aided Phobos and Ixion in massacring thousands of civilians in Boston. She eventually was beheaded by the messenger god Hermes. Several years later, she returned with her sister Stheno in an attempt to resurrect Medusa. With the help of Circe, they managed to revive their sister.
Urzkartaga	Wonder Woman (vol. 2) #28 (March 1989)	An African plant god who cursed Barbara Ann Minerva to become the Cheetah. He later bestowed his powers onto Sebastian Ballesteros.
Shim'Tar	Wonder Woman (vol. 2) #33 (August 1989)	There have been several champions of the Bana-Mighdall tribe of Amazons named Shim'Tar. The first of them was a mysterious woman that was used by wearing armor empowered by the Golden Girdle of Gaea to take over Bana-Mighdall, seemingly as a tool of Faruka, and slay Wonder Woman. Wonder Woman stopped her by taking away the girdle, after which Shim'Tar seemingly died in a massive explosion. Later, a magically controlled Hippolyta was transformed in a second Shim'tar during War of the Gods being subsequently saved by her daughter. The identity of the first Shim'tar remains unknown to this day.
White Magician	Wonder Woman Annual #3 (1992)	The sorcerer Thomas Asquith Randolph made a pact with a demon to acquire more magical power as his previous magic began to wane with age. During his climb to power, he became stunted in his rise several times by both Wonder Woman and her fellow Amazon sister Artemis of Bana-Mighdall. Wonder Woman was finally able to destroy the evil wizard-turned-demon, but at the cost of Artemis' life.
Cassandra "Cassie" Arnold	Wonder Woman Annual #3 (1992)	A television news reporter and the White Magician's lover. When the White Magician became more corrupt, he transformed Cassie Arnold into a green-skinned hag-like demon in order for her to battle Wonder Woman and Artemis. However, during the battle, she and the Cheetah were teleported away by the sorceress Circe.
Moot and Geof	Wonder Woman (vol. 2) #72 (March 1993)	Moot is a thief, assassin, and enforcer for Ares Buchanan's Mob operation who uses a deadly blade she calls her “Moot Point” and an android named Geof.
Antonio Sazia	Wonder Woman (vol. 2) #73 (April 1993)	Mid-level Mafioso who briefly wielded a “stasis field mask” device that allowed him to become a flying, fire-breathing demon.
Warmaster	Wonder Woman (vol. 2) #77 (August 1993)	Aristotle Buchanan was an indecisive loser with a small-stakes black market business until he was merged with the spirit of Ares and became the powerful Ares Buchanan the Warmaster, intent on inspiring war by flooding the city with deadly advanced technology pilfered from the defects and rejects of S.T.A.R. Labs.
Mayfly	Wonder Woman (vol. 2) #78 (September 1993)	Hemophiliac assassin who was even faster than the Flash. Post-DC Rebirth, the Mayfly was hired to murder Wonder Woman. After she failed, she was imprisoned in Antarctica. Visits from Wonder Woman led the Mayfly to ultimately leave the criminal life and seek out redemption.
Paulie Longo	Wonder Woman (vol. 2) #85 (April 1994)	Antonio Sazia's successor, who ran his Mob operation in concert with the White Magician.
Julianna Sazia	Wonder Woman (vol. 2) #87 (June 1994)	Widow who took over a Boston Mob family upon the death of her husband, hired the Cheetah, and engaged with both Artemis and Diana in a course of epic struggle with a rival Mob family.
Dark Angel	Wonder Woman (vol. 2) #131 (March 1998)	The Dark Angel is the spirit of an ancient demon summoned forth by the German Nazi Baroness Paula von Gunther during World War II. Finding an enemy in Wonder Woman's mother Queen Hippolyta, the two battled on several occasions. Seeking revenge, the Dark Angel secretly transported herself onto Themyscira and kidnapped Hippolyta's daughter Donna Troy, mistaking her for Diana. She placed Donna in suspended animation until she was rescued years later by the now-adult Diana as Wonder Woman. It was later revealed that the Dark Angel was, in fact, the Donna Troy of the Pre-Crisis Earth-Seven, saved from certain death by the Anti-Monitor.
Titan	Wonder Woman (vol. 2) #139 (December 1998)	One of the Titans of Myth and Cronus' son. Titan was a shadowy Hecatoncheire, a creature with 50 heads and 100 arms. During the Godwar, Titan joined Cronus as he attacked and defeated the Greek and Hindu gods. After the gods were restored by Wonder Woman, Titan was felled by Shiva and eventually imprisoned in the Underworld by Hades.
Oblivion	Wonder Woman (vol. 2) #140 (January 1999)	One of the Titans of Myth and a god of memory. Oblivion was a creature composed entirely of living memories. After Titan's initial failure at attacking Wonder Woman, Oblivion trapped Wonder Woman, Superman and Batman in false memories. Later, during the Godwar, Oblivion and his siblings attacked and defeated the Greek and Hindu pantheons. However, he was imprisoned in the Underworld by Hades after his father, Cronus', death.
Arch	Wonder Woman (vol. 2) #145 (June 1999)	One of the Titans of Myth and a god of strategy. Arch was a satyr-like creature with reptilian features. He wore a large helmet, but was otherwise completely nude. A child of Cronus, Arch gave his father the idea of attacking the Hindu gods after the Titans were able to defeat the Greek gods. Later, Arch was confronted by Athena and Hanuman, but was attempting to divert their attention away while Cronus attempted to use his Godwave attack. Cronus' attack failed and ended up devolving the Titan, while Arch and his siblings were imprisoned in the Underworld by Hades.
Disdain	Wonder Woman (vol. 2) #145 (June 1999)	One of the Titans of Myth and a goddess of deception. During the Godwar, Disdain attempted to use her abilities of seduction to attack Hades, but it failed and she was imprisoned in the Underworld with her siblings. Disdain was depicted as a woman with one side human and the other side a swirl of red and black.
Harrier	Wonder Woman (vol. 2) #145 (June 1999)	One of the Titans of Myth and a god of swift hunting. During the Godwar, Harrier was defeated by Durga, wife of Shiva. Harrier was later imprisoned in the Underworld by Hades. He resembled a winged, black-faced creature with the body of a serpent.
Slaughter	Wonder Woman (vol. 2) #145 (June 1999)	One of the Titans of Myth who resembles a centaur with one eye (similar to a cyclops). During the Godwar, Slaughter was imprisoned with his family in Hades after Cronus' death.
Drakul Karfang	JLA: A League of One (November 2000)	An ancient dragon prophesied to kill the Justice League. She was defeated by Wonder Woman, but was temporarily revived during the events of Justice League Dark.
Queen of Fables	JLA #47 (November 2000)	A sorceress from another dimension who plagued Wonder Woman following earlier confrontations with her and her Justice League teammates.
Stheno	Wonder Woman (vol. 2) #165 (February 2001)	A Gorgon and sister to Medusa and Euryale, she was sent by Phobos to kill Donna Troy, but failed and was decapitated by Nightwing. Later, she returned with Euryale in an attempt to resurrect Medusa.
Cyborgirl	Wonder Woman (vol. 2) #179 (May 2002)	After destroying her body by taking the drug known as "Tar", LeTonya Charles was given cybernetic implants by her aunt Sarah Charles, maintainer of the cybernetic components of the superhero Cyborg; however, instead of using her newly gained abilities for good, she decided to serve her own selfish desires and became a villain, coming into conflict with Wonder Woman. While granting the benefit of superhuman strength and numerous other functions such as sensors, these advanced implants replaced much of LeTonya's humanity with hardware, which could be the reason why LeTonya failed to use her new lease on life for anything other than personal gain. At some point, LeTonya was drafted by Queen Clea to become a member of the newly reformed Villainy Inc. as Cyborgirl. The team attempted to overthrow Skartaris, though they were ultimately defeated by Wonder Woman. She was later recruited as a member of Alexander Luthor, Jr.'s Secret Society of Super Villains, Libra's Secret Society of Super Villains, and the Cyborg Revenge Squad in DC Special: Cyborg #6.
Alkyone	"The Circle" in Wonder Woman (vol. 3) #14-17 (January 2008-April 2008)	Alkyone was the captain of Hippolyta's royal guard. She, along with three other Amazons, agreed to protect their queen's life at all costs. When word got out that Queen Hippolyta was praying to the gods for a child, Alkyone believed it would destroy them. She has always hated Diana, thinking she was the cause of all the Amazons' problems and has endlessly plotted to murder her. Her hatred for Diana is only matched by her praise for Hippolyta and her illusions made her believe every horror she did was in Hyppolyta's name. The first time she has tried to murder Diana (who was barely born), Alkyone intruded in the Queen's rooms to slaughter the child, but Hyppolyta woke up and punished her and her three friends by sending them to jail. Alkyone then asked her three friends to help her a few years later. She failed that time as well to murder the princess and was "humiliated" by Diana. She was married to Achilles and ruled Themyscira for a short time, but her intentions were always that Hippolyta regain her throne. The third time Alkyone appeared, she called Cottus, a slimy black monster from the depths of Themyscira, believing it was the princess' father.
Genocide	Wonder Woman (vol. 3) #26 (November 2008)	Created by Cheetah's Secret Society of Super Villains, Genocide was formed using soil samples taken from various locations on Earth where genocide took place and magically adding them to Wonder Woman's future corpse which resulted in the formation of an evil female golem.
Crow Children	"War Killer" in Wonder Woman (vol. 3) #37-41	The sons of Ares; Brother Goat, Brother Spider, Brother Rat, Brother Scorpion, and Brother Adder are the result of a plan of revenge by Ares against Wonder Woman after she slew him in battle. As a result of magic that Ares used in the Underworld, five Amazons became inexplicably pregnant. While this normally would have been a momentous event, the times were greatly troubled on Themyscira, with the Amazon Alkyone having displaced Queen Hippolyte and Zeus having imposed Achilles as the first King of Themyscira. Men had also come to live on the island, the Gargareans, and though none of the Amazons apparently had sex with them, their presence was enough that immaculate conception was not the only possibility. The boys were dispatched to Washington D.C., where they used their mind control powers to ignite racial riots in their attempt to defame Wonder Woman. They ended up being defeated by Wonder Woman who used her Lasso of Truth to see through their illusions. Instead of the planned conclusion to the story, in which the boys turned into demonic versions of their animal spirits, causing further havoc in the streets, the issue ended anticlimactically with Wonder Woman giving them a spanking. However, the originally planned ending alludes to them having powers to transform into large animal demons.
The Dark Man	Wonder Woman #601 (September 2010)	A sadistic minion of the Morrigan who had once been a government agent named Lucius. He was burnt to near-death but was saved by the Morrigan in exchange for his servitude. He slaughtered the Amazons of Themyscira, including Queen Hippolyta. Later, during a battle with Wonder Woman, Hippolyta returned and took her revenge on Lucius, carrying him back into the flames with her.
Cernunnos	Wonder Woman #604 (December 2010)	An agent of the Dark Man who had tried to report back to the Morrigan, but was turned to stone by Medusa's head. He, along with his partner, was transformed by Anann, one of the Morrigan. He became a centaur and attacked Wonder Woman, managing to spear her through the shoulder. After murdering Phillipus, Cernunnos was killed by Wonder Woman.
Minotaur	Wonder Woman #604 (December 2010)	An agent of the Dark Man who had tried to report back to the Morrigan along with Cernunnos. He was transformed into a Minotaur by Anann. After carrying out the Morrigan's bidding and revealing their plans to Wonder Woman, the Minotaur hanged himself using Diana's lasso. In The New 52, a Minotaur appears as an adversary for Diana in her early formative years, whom she was meant to slay as part of her rite of passage. Diana chose to spare the creature, and he later accompanied Diana's villainous half-sister Cassandra as her bodyguard and enforcer.
Anann	Wonder Woman #605 (January 2011)	One of the Morrigan, a trio of war goddesses. Her plan was to eliminate the Amazons and recruit Diana as the third sister, replacing Enyo. The most powerful of the Morrigan, Anann outlives Bellona, and in the final battle manages to slay the Cheetah with ease. However, as she uses her magical Song of Death to suck the life from Diana, a fatally wounded Artemis shoots Anann in the neck with an arrow. The wound causes Anann to continue singing until she explodes, destroying the skyscraper they were using as a headquarters.
Bellona	Wonder Woman #605 (January 2011)	One of the Morrigan, a trio of war goddesses. Like Anann, she wished to recruit Diana into her triumvirate. to weaken Diana's spirit, she resurrected the spirits of three Amazon warriors: Artemis, the Cheetah, and Giganta. After a warning from Enyo, their deceased sister, the Morrigan decided that Diana must die instead of joining them. However, after repeated failures, their mistress Nemesis gave them one last chance. During their final encounter with Wonder Woman, who had convinced the three resurrected Amazons to join her, Bellona was severely wounded by Giganta. As she crawled away, Doctor Psycho and Ajax, her former sparring partner and slave, finished her off.
Nemesis	Wonder Woman #611 (July 2011)	A loose adaptation of the real-world Greek goddess of the same name, Nemesis is responsible for bringing vengeance for the unjustly killed. Over the millennia, the voices and hatred of the spirits who have died drove her insane and she decided the only way to bring peace was to scour Earth of humanity or have another take her place. She created a plan to steal the life, form, and powers of Wonder Woman with the help of a trio of war goddesses, the Morrigan. She was partially thwarted by the Fate Clotho, whose meddling allowed a sliver of Diana's self to escape from a deadly ambush, whereupon she set the Morrigan to help shape this new form of Diana to her needs and twist her justice to vengeance as well. With Wonder Woman's power in addition to her own, her control over the spirits of the dead and the deadly Flashing Blade which could slay gods, not even the Gods of Olympus dared openly oppose her; it was up to Diana to grow strong enough to confront Nemesis once more and regain her power. The two fought, first Nemesis in Wonder Woman's form and then, once Diana did succeed in reuniting herself, on her own. Wonder Woman slew Nemesis with her own sword, and the goddess finally felt at peace as she lay dying, the cries of the unjustly slain and the need to punish passing on to another. In The New 52, she reappears as a villainous antagonist. In a possible future scenario depicted in Superman/Wonder Woman: Futures End #1, it was revealed that Nemesis infected Diana, then trapped her in the realm of Tartarus and under a state of delusion where she was fighting what she perceived as her enemies when, in fact, they were just illusions. Superman managed to rescue Diana and brought her out of Tartarus; then, along with the remnant of the Amazon army, they faced the goddess together.

==== The New 52 & DC Rebirth ====
In September 2011, The New 52 rebooted DC's continuity.

Villain	First appearance	Description
Apollo	Wonder Woman (vol. 4) #1 (September 2011)	The sun god, brother of Artemis, Apollo has long had his sights on the throne of Olympus, but only at the discovery of Zeus' absence does he make his move. Being pragmatic, he bargained for Hera's permission to take the throne if he returned the last of Zeus' lovers to her. Apollo proved the wiser of the two, as Hera only permitted Apollo the chance in the belief that Zeus would immediately return to her, while Apollo had realized through portents that he would not; he did not even exist. He remained an adversary of Wonder Woman as his goals generally moved against hers, though he lacked the rage his sister felt for having been badly beaten by the Amazon. Apollo's planning came undone eventually when he believed he could torture the First Born into relinquishing his own quest for the throne, ending with his older brother breaking free and killing him. Previous versions of Apollo appeared in the Wonder Woman series as an ally to the Amazons.
The First Born	Wonder Woman (vol. 4) #12 (December 2012)	While still an infant, the first-born child of Zeus and Hera was condemned to death by his own father, who feared a prophecy foretelling that his eldest child would slay him and the other Greek gods and become the sole ruler of Mount Olympus. Escaping death, he grew to adulthood away from Olympus and eventually conquered the world, but was imprisoned in the center of the Earth by Zeus after failing to unseat the Olympian gods. Clawing his way through the planet's crust for seven thousand years, the First Born returned to a world where Zeus had erased all knowledge of him from human memory. When he is freed him from the Arctic ice by an 'end of the world' cult, led by his evil half-sister, Cassandra, he and his hyena-men conquer London with plans to attack Mount Olympus. He is swiftly defeated by Wonder Woman, but not before killing their half-mortal brother, the British super-soldier Lennox.
Cassandra	Wonder Woman (vol. 4) #14 (January 2013)	A demigod child of Zeus and a mortal woman, born with the ability to control the wills of others using her voice. Cassandra was raised alone by her mother, who eventually died after Cassandra ordered her mother to commit suicide. Once she realized that she had ordered her mother into her death, Cassandra was placed into an orphanage and had refused to speak since then. Lennox eventually found the young Cassandra and took her under his wing. At one point, she had 40 people murder each other using her hypnotic voice, but had her throat ripped open by Lennox as retaliation for her heinous actions. She managed to survive her injury and had her throat replaced by a bionic device that allowed her to speak. Eventually she managed to uncover the First Born, the firstborn son of Zeus and Hera, with a team of scientists and managed to convince him to trust her as his ally. She accompanied the First Born as he battled Hades and Poseidon, eventually making their way to London where they confronted Lennox, Diana, Zola, and Hera in an attempt to capture Zeke. Losing the First Born to the combined powers of Wonder Woman, Orion, and Ares, Cassandra was left to attempt another path to Olympus by capturing one of those able to go there. First, she captured her half-brother Milan, who otherwise had spoken in her defense, before being led to Dionysus where she and the Minotaur managed to capture him and take them to Olympus in time to see the First Born kill Apollo and claim the throne. Cassandra was driven mad with starvation and cannibalism during her stay with the First Born before being set loose on his enemies as a distraction. During the battle for Themyscira, Cassandra chased Zola before being confronted by Hera, but was spared death thanks to Diana. What happened to her afterwards remains unknown.
Grail	Forever Evil #7 (July 2014)	The daughter of Darkseid and an Amazon named Myrina Black. After the events of the Darkseid War, Grail rescued the newborn Darkseid and kept him in hiding on Earth. She later began attacking various demigods such as Hercules to steal their life essences to restore her father to his full power. This put her in direct conflict with Wonder Woman.
Derinoe	Wonder Woman (vol. 4) #36 (January 2015)	An elderly Amazon who was vehemently against the male Amazons being allowed to reside on Themyscira. As a member of the Amazons' council, she managed to rally several of her sisters to her side. In secret, she was working with the goddess Hecate and participated in a sacrificial ceremony of an infant. This ceremony led to the birth of Donna Troy. After inciting the Amazons against Wonder Woman, Derinoe was killed by a thrown dagger before she was able to attack Diana. It was later revealed she had been Hippolyta's lover.
Eirene	Wonder Woman (vol. 4) #45 (December 2015)	The Goddess of Peace and former lover of Ares. She sought out vengeance on Wonder Woman for having slain the God of War. Allied with Aegeus, her numerous attempts to kill Wonder Woman failed. She regained her sanity when Ares and Apollo were restored to life by Zeke.
Karnell	Wonder Woman Annual #2 (June 2018)	A member of the Dark Pantheon of Gods who were brought to Wonder Woman's universe after the events of Dark Nights: Metal. Karnell calls himself the God of Love, and first encountered Wonder Woman while she was working alongside the Star Sapphires. He revealed his origin: He was a young boy who grew up in an abusive household. After his mother was killed by his father, he ran away, and was taken by King Best and made into a god.
Armageddon	Wonder Woman #753 (May 2020)	A female warrior from an unidentified race of ogres. Her grandfather was the first Armageddon and her father was the second Armageddon where they each fought Wonder Woman. Armageddon was recruited into Paula von Gunther's Four Horsewomen.
Liar Liar	Wonder Woman #759 (September 2020)	Emma Deropalis is the daughter of Maxwell Lord with similar telepathic abilities.
Janus	Wonder Woman #774 (August 2021)	Inspired by the classical deity of the same name, Janus is the Roman god of gateways, time, and revolution. They are metaphysically split into two warring beings: an aging, male god scheming to freeze reality in the past and a violent, green-skinned goddess attacking the present to conquer destiny, free will and the future. Ending an eternity of domination by the male half, Janus, wielding the reality-warping "God Scraper" scythe, stole the throne of Asgard, abandoned by Odin of the Norse gods - then, massacred the Olympian gods and attacked the Multiverse, ravaging parallel worlds and alternate timelines until Wonder Woman rallied surviving Norse and Greek gods to stop her.
Altuum the Survivor	Wonder Woman 2021 Annual #1 (January 2022)	The last survivor of the Enki people that lived on Themyscira before the Amazons.
Chaos	Wonder Woman #785 (May 2022)	A primordial deity who surfaced after the death of Hippolyta.
The Sovereign	Wonder Woman #1 (November 2023)	A mysterious, elderly man who orchestrated the creation of the Amazon Extradition Entity, and turned the United States against the Amazons of Themyscira.

=== One-shots ===
==== Golden Age ====
Villain	First appearance	Description
Von Storm	All Star Comics #8	A Nazi who is partly responsible for Steve Trevor crashing on Paradise Island when he steals a robot plane which Trevor pursues. He never returns again after this appearance.
Prince del Slimo	Sensation Comics #8	The greedy fiancé of the wealthy Gloria Bullfinch, owner of Bullfinch stores, he attempted to blow up the department store to cover up for stealing money from the safe. His men were told to go after Diana, who had become Wonder Woman. She met a woman practicing being a robber, but who tried to warn her of the criminals behind her. They coshed her from behind, bound and gagged her, and placed her in a trunk, where she came to from the jolting. However, she endured long hours of captivity to be with Steve. She was taken to him, ungagged, and partially released so she could stand up, and he realized who she was. She was then placed in the safe with a bomb. Steve had already been tied up and placed in there. Wonder Woman broke her bonds, stopped the bomb, broke out of the safe, and exposed del Slimo.
Pepita Valdez	Wonder Woman #1 (summer 1942)	Compelled to act as a spy for the Axis because a Japanese general was holding her father in Mexico, Pepita seduced Etta Candy's brother Mint after he injured himself and used drugged cigarettes to force him to unwittingly reveal military secrets for the Japanese, who were planning to invade Mexico.
Duke Dalgan	Sensation Comics #26	Leader of a group of international racketeers seeking to steal Plan 48, the official plan for disposition of all U.S. air and sea forces.
Doctor Cue / Agent X	Sensation Comics #9 (September 1942)	Japanese Col. Togo Ku, chief of Japanese spies in America, wore a full face mask as Dr. Cue, who kidnapped women (including Diana Prince White) for use in an underground "hospital" of horrors where he tested biological weapons, and also disguised himself as the female "Agent X" in a scheme to obtain a disintegrating gas developed by Dan White, husband of the real Diana Prince.
The Masked Menace	Sensation Comics #16 (April 1943)	Axis agent Karl Schultz, using the alias Prince Hylo Goulash of Hungary, became Etta's fiancé and worked with Japanese saboteurs and Italian agents disguised as Mexican ranch hands to commit sabotage in the Southwest, in particular to destroy the oil fields connected to the Bar-L Ranch owned by Etta Candy's father, Hard Candy.
Princess Yasmini	Sensation Comics #17 (June 1943)	Royalty from India who operates a Nazi spy ring and broadcasts from a Cape Cod radio station and uses pet lions, Thuggee assassins, and poison in her evil schemes.
Big Ike McGlone	Sensation Comics #28	Wonder Woman in a town makes the mayor jealous, 'forming a green imp of jealousy.' He gets the help of a corrupt police officer to stop Wonder Woman. They decide to use Big Ike, a convict Wonder Woman wanted to be rehabilitated. He captures her using her lasso and blindfolds her. He feeds her himself as he doesn't want her free at all. She is used to steal the $1 million she got to the bank in bonds. She is then taken to a remote area which is set on fire. She uses mental communication to get the Holliday Girls to help her. She frees herself and removes the tape covering her eyes. Ike is defeated by a policeman, and the mayor says he will stop being so jealous of Wonder Woman.
American Adolph	Sensation Comics #21 (September 1943)	Inspired by the example of Adolf Hitler, the American Adolph penned a prison manifesto My War Against Society, in which he detailed his plot to organize a massive criminal network nation-within-the-nation. He was a master of disguise, a superb athlete, a cunning planner, and a charismatic leader.
Danny "the Demon"	The Big All-American Comic Book #1 (1944)	Murderous thug who killed Gen. Courtney, framed Steve Trevor for the crime, and then hid in a circus after killing Dipsy the Clown and assuming his identity.
Doctor Frenzi	Sensation Comics #81	The Leader of the Greenshirts, a bigoted organisation who terrorised Oakville. He succeeds in capturing a group of the Holliday Girls, binding and gagging them, and using them to trap Wonder Woman. She is chained, losing her powers, and nearly killed along with the hostages when cement is poured into the room, but Steve is able to save her and she then frees the Holliday Girls from the cement.
Anton Unreal	Sensation Comics #30 (June 1944)	Anton Unreal led a cult that brainwashed rich young adults into handing over their funds to become Blue Spirit Masters of the 4th Dimension. He used a device to trap Steve Trevor's body in the 4th dimension, leaving him an insubstantial thought form in this dimension.
Vulture King	Comic Cavalcade #7 (June 1944)	Hunchbacked scientist who unlocked the secret of nuclear fission. He fashioned a mechanical vulture suit capable of lifting fifty tons and flying through the air at the speed of sound. The Vulture King kidnapped people, implanting mind control devices through their ear canals into their brains, and augmenting them, turning them into mindless vulture drones outfitted with the same powers of flight and strength as his suit.
Sontag Henya	Sensation Comics #35 (November 1944)	Leader of an anarchist movement in the Atlantean nation of Venturia, exploiting the history of mistreatment at the hands of Queen Clea and a subsequent rebellion against the kind-hearted Queen Octavia.
King Neptune	Comic Cavalcade #9 (winter 1944)	Another female villain who disguised herself as a man, King Neptune was really Leona Masters, an Olympic Games swimmer known in the press as the "Mermaid Queen" until forced off the team for breaking training rules. Using the drug nepenthe for brainwashing and memory wiping, a trident that sends out electric flashes, a submarine, and a squadron of "mermaids", she ran a piracy operation from her undersea cave on the Equator.
Great Blue Father	Comic Cavalcade #10 (spring 1945)	Biologist Dr. Protus Plasm disguises himself as the Great Blue Father, leader of a cult "family" using his "moron hormone", a chemical that makes people childlike.
The Third World War Promoters	Wonder Woman #12 (spring 1945)	Network of munitions manufacturers and industrialists around the world who operated from a headquarters in a secret sub-basement in the building next to military intelligence HQ. Planted spy Nerva as Steve Trevor's secretary. Crafty Velma Boswell, wife and business partner of Bird Boswell, escaped the Promoters' imprisonment on Venus and rounded up other members of the network for an attempted takeover of Venus (full-length tale scripted by Joyce Murchison).
Gentleman Killer	Wonder Woman #14 (fall 1945)	Rudolph Hessenpfeffer, the Gentleman Killer, was a debonair, charming, and ruthless killer and spy.
Professor Toxino	Sensation Comics #52 (April 1946)	Dejected scientist who used crossbreeding to create the red-winged fly, one bite from which would cause a psychotic break, for which he also created the sole antidote, anti-crimic.
Premier Fiendo	Sensation Comics #54 (June 1946)	Dr. Fiendo invented a fake “atom-splitting machine” that was touted as emitting a death ray, which he used to have himself installed in the Cabinet in the newly created position of Premier of Peace, then slowly took over the U.S. government with the backing of his Peace Police thugs.
Bughuman Plague	Sensation Comics #55 (July 1946)	A microbial society that almost conquered the globe after being enlarged by a reckless experiment conducted by Gerta von Gunther.
Doctor Novel	Sensation Comics #56 (August 1946)	With the assistance of his co-conspirator “Dynamite Dan", Dr. Novel attempted to defraud the U.S. government of billions with his fraudulent “anti-atomic metal", which he claimed was a light-weight metal that could resist and contain atomic explosions.
Roba	Comic Cavalcade #19	A girl forced into villainous activities by a criminal gang and taken to Paradise Island, Roba at first aided the criminals, but then repented and freed Wonder Woman from a death trap.
Syonide	Sensation Comics #57 (September 1946)	Psychotic, hatchet-wielding dwarf who believed he was Chief Powhatan and Diana Prince was his daughter Pocahontas.
Black Robert	Sensation Comics #62 (February 1947)	Usurper of the throne of Anglonia, a hidden city-state in the mountains near Palestine of descendants of lost Crusaders, who mistakenly believed Steve Trevor was Prince Hubert, the rightful heir of the throne.
Gell Osey	Wonder Woman #22 (March/April 1947)	A member of the Holliday Girls whose jealousy led her to become an enemy of Wonder Woman.
Lim Snait	Sensation Comics #65 (May 1947)	Alaskan who murders to steal gold claims.
Slick Skeener	Sensation Comics #66 (June 1947)	Succeeded Crime Brain Doone as leader of the Sly Fox Mob in Washington.
King Blotto	Sensation Comics #64 (April 1947)	King of the Little Cloud People, who have been kidnapping airmen, including Steve Trevor.
Sharkeeta	Comic Cavalcade #21 (June/July 1947)	Sharkeeta was the leader of a pack of sharks that became humanoid-shark "flying mermaid" hybrids after unauthorized experiments by Paula von Gunther's daughter Gerta. Sharkeeta seized Queen Hippolyta's magic girdle and was only defeated when Gerta provided the missing human element.
The Purple Priestess	Wonder Woman #25 (September/October 1947)	Sinestra, a former Axis agent, was a cult leader from Zarikan who used a purple gas to brainwash her acolytes into unthinking devotion. Her cult was responsible for a series of murders before Wonder Woman drove them away.
King Tassel	Wonder Woman #25 (September/October 1947)	Ruler of the planetoid Rykornia which encircled the Earth as a secret moon. King Tassel was the leader of the Rykornians. A race of geometric corn people who are born from redwood sized corn stalks and use corn-based technology to further their efforts of consuming nutrients from the world to grow their numbers, killing anything that is not Rykorn. They seek to reach Earth so they may spread, killing all life upon it for the sake of the terrible Rykorn
Ironsides	Comic Cavalcade #23 (October/November 1947)	Brother of Doctor Psycho; a brilliant geologist who used stilts and armor to frighten natives of Wooloo Island into believing iron giants threatened them.
Queen Flamina	Sensation Comics #71 (November 1947)	Queen of a race of female fire-warriors.
King Crystallar	Wonder Woman #26 (November/December 1947)	King of a race of crystal-people who used his trickery to dupe Wonder Woman into battling his enemies for him.
Tigra Tropica	Wonder Woman #26 (November/December 1947)	Glamorous wild animal trainer and extortionist; used a pack of highly trained tigers; could press nerves behind the ears to induce hypnotic, highly suggestible states.
Lya	Comic Cavalcade #26 (April/May 1948)	Daughter of the Duke of Deception, who double-crossed her own father and was a mistress of lies.
Anti-Electric	Comic Cavalcade #27 (June/July 1948)	Invented a "deactivating electronic generator" which cancels out electric current on nationwide scale.
Furiosa	Sensation Comics #78 (June 1948)	Mistress of masquerade and spy ringleader, disguises herself as Steve Trevor to steal a formula for using lunar energy.
Mona Menise	Wonder Woman #30 (1948)	Obsessed with childhood friend Steve Trevor, the murderous wild-child daughter of a general; already evil-minded, she gained the power to enslave men with her song when she donned an armband carved from a tree that the siren Parthenope had been transformed into by Aphrodite.
The Trixter	Wonder Woman #31 (Sept.–Oct. 1948)	Leader of a criminal racket who claims to be a wizard from the year 1313 and performs feats of "magic" by using mass hypnosis and advanced science to fool the public.
Frenzi	Sensation Comics #82 (October 1948)	Leads anti-immigrant "America for Americans first" Greenshirt movement, exploiting anxieties about jobless and the economy in a cynical ploy to raise money from his followers.
Prowd and Rata	Sensation Comics #83 (November 1948)	Prowd, ruler of the city of Elam in a distant future, attempted to subjugate the nation's women once and for all after an Olympiad, with the aid of Loki, god of evil, and Rata, his spy in the women's compound Noman.
Duke Daxo	Sensation Comics #84 (December 1948)	Tyrant who arranged the death of his brother and staged a coup to take over Hummingbird Isle from Queen Sala and Princess Turula.
C. O. Lector	Sensation Comics #86 (February 1949)	Millionaire collector who attempted to collect Wonder Woman's bracelets.
Jabez Dexter	Sensation Comics #87 (March 1949)	Biggest rancher of the Old West town Twin Peaks back in 1849, he attempted to thwart a plan to connect the town to train rail to avoid exposure of his fraudulent land claims.
Van Kent	Sensation Comics #88 (April 1949)	Hollywood film producer who tried to thwart a rival director's success by sabotaging the production of the film Danger Trails.
Abacus Rackeet	Sensation Comics #89 (May 1949)	Gambling racketeer who attempted to discover the location of Paradise Island to mine the bullet-proof Amazonium ore.
Talbot the Great	Sensation Comics #93 (Sept.–Oct. 1949)	Typical stage magician with a mind-reading schtick who, after injuring his head in a car crash, developed real mind-reading powers which he used for criminal purposes.
King Midas	Wonder Woman #39 (Jan.–Feb. 1950)	Self-styled king who wore a crown and lived in a palace, Midas was nothing more than a crook out to steal precious metals and the radium store owned by Holliday College.
Tora Rivvers	Wonder Woman #40 (March–April 1950)	Millionaire socialite who bankrolled production of the film Hollywood Goes to Paradise Island to secure the starring role, only to sabotage it in retaliation for being cast as the villainess.
Mister Breezy	Wonder Woman #41 (May–June 1950)	Traveling salesman and con artist who tried to take advantage of a mountain town so isolated its residents could not recognize Wonder Woman, who was suffering temporary amnesia and adopted the name Belle Dazzle.
General Virtigo	Wonder Woman #42 (July–Aug. 1950)	Leader of invasion force from Venus, which caused the entire world to black out for an entire day.
Z-One	Wonder Woman #43 (Sept.-Oct. 1950)	Master spy with three lieutenants, each of which knew the identity of only one other lieutenant (who included Waldo Nordo, CEO of Ajax Steel, and Derek Waters, staffer at Mammoth Mt. Dam).
The Bayou Killer	Wonder Woman #43 (Sept.–Oct. 1950)	Globe Trotter hid the death of his insane twin brother Vance and framed him for the murder of his uncle, Col. South. Controlled elephants, but his abusive training of elephant Tuska was overcome by Wonder Woman's loving care for the animal, which decided against following Trotter's order to kill her.
Master de Stroyer	Wonder Woman #44 (Nov.–Dec. 1950)	The Sargasso Sea Kingdom was founded by Princess Althea and her Greek kingdom, along with the Roman raiders who had attempted to enslave them, when they were swept away at sea. A supply of rare sea herbs kept them immortal, and they developed advanced technology, including an atmosphere controlling machine intended to prevent more shipwrecks, until Master de Stroyer and his band of Warmongers (among them the lovely Dangeress) took over.
Professor Turgo	Wonder Woman #46 (March–April 1951)	A mad genius who invented, among other things, a super magnet and a rocket he used to land on and take over a floating planetoid that entered the Solar System and positioned itself between the Moon and Earth. Was later hired by H.I.V.E. as part of the Inner Council of seven scientists, all of whom were slain by the H.I.V.E. Mistress when the Teen Titans defeated their operation.
Professor Jenkel	Wonder Woman #46 (March–April 1951)	Criminal mastermind with a penchant for top hats and capes, hired by the underworld to take out Wonder Woman with a plot that involved circus act the Lane Twins, with Joan and Inez Lane each pretending to be Wonder Woman.
Elektro	Wonder Woman #48 (July-Aug. 1951)	Scientific head of the criminal underworld. Invented a robot doppelganger of Wonder Woman which was equal to Wonder Woman in speed and strength. Controlling the robot with an electronic switchboard and monitoring it from a third person perspective with a variable television screen, Elektro used it to commit crimes to frame Wonder Woman.
Strogo	Wonder Woman #52 (March–April 1952)	Wizard of the Planet of Thought, where events tended to be telepathically projected out into the universe and embodied in fiction and fairy tales, whose black magic depended on the scarce element Xium.
The Chameleon	Wonder Woman #52 (March–April 1952)	An agent of the wizard Strogo, the Chameleon used black magic fueled by the element Xium on the Planet of Thought to change herself into anyone else.
Professor Luxo	Sensation Comics #101 (Jan.–Feb. 1951)	A former opponent thought to have perished in a volcano, Luxo sabotaged an atomic-powered ship project and attempted to take over a subatomic world. Rode a flying robot horse in the atom world. Stole element A and used it to combine with the element X abundant in the atom world's water, creating the unstable element AX.
Queen Helen	Sensation Comics #102 (March–April 1951)	A descendant of Helen of Troy, Queen Helen ruled over a hidden island nation of the descendants of refugees from ancient Troy who continued to harbor dreams of revenge against the Greeks.
Baron de Boar	Sensation Comics #106 (Nov.-Dec. 1951)	Last descendant of the medieval Baron de Boar, the modern Baron stole his ancestor's armor, complete with boar's head helmet, and began stealing all armors ever worn by his ancestor and then rigged them with robot controls to use them in robberies.
The Crime Master of Time	Wonder Woman #53 (May/June 1952)	Tibro, Public Enemy No. 1 of the year 2300, enters the 20th century by becoming a duplicate of a 20th-century person and simultaneously sending that person backwards 1,000 years in time to a slave galley; hunts for a portable hydrogen bomb; funds his search by staging daring robberies.
The Termite Queen	Wonder Woman #58 (March/April 1953)	Central controlling intelligence of a super-swarm of sentient mutant termites out to destroy the human world.
Duke Dazam	Wonder Woman #59 (May/June 1953)	First DC multiversal villain; Duke Dazam was a cruel tyrant on a parallel Earth who took that world's Wonder Woman's kingdom, whose rule was toppled by the combined might of Wonder Woman and that Earth's Wonder Woman (for whom the title Princess Tara Terruna translated to mean Wonder Woman).
The Human Tank	Wonder Woman #63 (Jan. 1954)	Bullet-proof thug who donned football gear and robbed banks.
The Thought Master	Wonder Woman #64 (Feb. 1954)	Wonder Woman's "old enemy" the Thought Master was hired by organized crime to use his powerful illusion casting powers to trap her in a world of illusion.
The Volcano Prophet	Wonder Woman #70 (Nov. 1954)	Schemer who claims to be a prophet wandering the world and predicting the eruption of dormant volcanoes in exchange for millions, but who secretly caused the eruptions himself with his technology.
The Mirage-Maker	Wonder Woman #76 (August 1955)	The Mirage-Maker was a scientist who developed a device for projecting illusions into other people's minds, which he used to discredit Wonder Woman by making her falsely believe she was stopping crimes, whereas she was really rounding up innocents.
Machino	Wonder Woman #80 (February 1956)	Machino sought revenge on the Amazon for imprisoning him years earlier by inducing her to fall into a deep sleep and then trapping her face in a mask rigged to explode.

==== Silver Age ====
Villain	First appearance	Description
The Time Master	Wonder Woman #101 (October 1958)	Using the alias Ty M. Master, creates a fun house that has mirrored doors lead to different time periods to destroy Wonder Woman. After she vibrates through the doors and catches him, he admits defeat and disappears. Possibly the Time Trapper.
The Gadget-Maker	Wonder Woman #103 (January 1959)	Inventor of ingenious gadgets that appeared to be harmless toys or household objects but were deadly instruments of murder.
Princess #1,003	Wonder Woman #110 (November 1959)	Alien princess, one of 2,785 others and forced constantly into group activities, Princess #1,003 fled to Earth and crash-landed in a jungle, where the natives revered her as the goddess of flame and daughter of the sun god. She wielded a hypnotic flute, paralyzing ray, and other devices from her world, which sent a warrior fleet to threaten the Earth unless it returned the princess.
Queen Mikra	Wonder Woman #113 (April 1960)	Ancient Egyptian queen 7,000 years old who resembles Wonder Woman, mystically revived by her sphinxes of living stone, which only other sphinxes could destroy.
Professor Andro	Wonder Woman #116 (August 1960)	Time-traveling crystalline alien who pops up throughout history to cause disasters and attempted to sabotage a rocket launch using mental force, while using an illusion to disguise himself as the same person.
The Machine Men	Wonder Woman #136 (February 1963)	Robotic alien race that attempted to take out Wonder Woman in preparation for an invasion of Earth by using a "giant-fruit-bullet" that contains a "food bullet" that turned Wonder Woman into a super giant who threatened the world's food supply with her ravenous hunger.
The Glop	Wonder Woman #151 (January 1965)	An alien creature, the villain in a tale dreamed by young Diana, which metamorphoses into the form of anything it digests.
Mister Monster	Wonder Woman #155 (July 1965)	Prince of an alien spaceship city, he was cursed on his wedding day to become a monster as his bad attitude increased, although his handsome visage was restored when his attitude became more positive.

==== Bronze Age ====
Villain	First appearance	Description
Doctor Domino	Wonder Woman #205 (March–April 1973)	Leader of terrorist organization who attacked Morgan Tracy to get his hands on the deadly Bacteria Cloudburst.
The Revenger	Superman's Girlfriend, Lois Lane #136 (January–February 1974)	Marcia Roche was an unstable mental patient who once threw herself at Superman and begged him to marry her; obsessed, she escaped and set an elaborate scheme in motion to assassinate Superman's girlfriend, targeting Lois Lane until Superman set up a sham relationship with the next target of the Revenger: Wonder Woman.
Diogenes Diamondopolous	Wonder Woman #216 (February–March 1975)	Billionaire shipping magnate obsessed with setting foot upon Paradise Island, motivated by the belief that only Wonder Woman was worthy enough to be his mate.
Damon Celestris	Wonder Woman #218 (June–July 1975)	In his guise as a personal astrologer to prominent public figures, Damon secretly uses a machine called the Mento-Amplifier to extract positive thinking from an unsuspecting source and to then amplify it, channeling the power back into his clients through post-hypnotic suggestion, allowing them to fulfill their dreams as 'foretold' by him. Thinking Wonder Woman's powers were interfering with the Mento-Amplifier, he launched a mental attack that tripped her up every time she tried to use her lasso or tiara, not realizing that the great mental power he was tapping into to fuel the Mento-Amplifier was actually Wonder Woman's.
Wade Dazzle	Wonder Woman #222 (February/March 1976)	Billionaire cartoon and amusement park mogul who sought the secret of the Amazons' immortality. A DC parody of Walt Disney.
Panthea	Wonder Woman #224 (June/July 1976)	Amazon astronomer eventually driven mad when her bracelets were destroyed, Panthea became obsessed with the invisibility cloak around Paradise Island interfering with her instruments and decided to launch a coup.
Ludwig von Schmeer	World's Finest #244 (April–May 1977)	Nazi master of disguise who tried to trick Steve Trevor into delivering a booby-trapped briefcase to free a French army agent.
The Iron Claw	World's Finest #245 (June–July 1977)	Hooded man with clawed mechanical right arm who worked at Nazi intelligence high command.
Lt. Pierre Marchand	Wonder Woman #238 (December 1977)	A dashing man calling himself Lt. Pierre Marchand of the Free French Army claimed to be a friend of Etta Candy's brother and wooed her, becoming her fiancé, all the while hatching a nefarious plot that was never revealed, because the Wonder Woman book abruptly returned to a modern-day setting. Marchand was presumably a parallel of the Masked Menace—a Nazi spy whose plans involved wooing Etta.
The Sumo	All-New Collectors Edition: Superman v. Wonder Woman (1978)	Trained from childhood at the school of ancient samurai, the young man who became the Sumo was the only one chosen to sip the sacred potion of power, composed of special herbs and forbidden roots, which in one year caused him to grow to gigantic size and made him stronger, faster, and more agile, with superhuman control of his physical senses.
The Bombardier	Wonder Woman Spectacular (DC Special Series #9) (1978)	American pilot Tom Cole was saved from an explosion by a mystical force, a Voice that charged him with aiding the war effort using powers from a mystical amulet. Cole became a Congressman who was suspicious of Steve Trevor and Wonder Woman and secretly aided the war effort as the superheroic Bombardier. Unknown to Cole, his amulet was the Disc of Mars, which magnified the experience of warfare to power Mars, the God of War.
S.C.Y.T.H.E.	Wonder Woman #244 (June 1978)	S.C.Y.T.H.E. was an anti-government terrorist organization from a European country called Lugwainia. They abducted brilliant aeronautics engineer Robert Selkirk, who had spent years as a political prisoner in a pseudo-Soviet nation before gaining asylum in the U.S. S.C.Y.T.H.E. demanded to exchange Selkirk with their imprisoned leader, Alexander Sorkhan.
The Queen of Darkness	Wonder Woman #246 (August 1978)	Ruler of an interdimensional Hell who was summoned by Mrs. Kobritz, an apparently harmless widow and occult dabbler who lived in Diana Prince's apartment building.
The Dark Commander	Wonder Woman #248 (July 1978)	Former leader of demon hordes in ancient times, his corpse was found deep underneath New York City by U.S. Army Major Bradley, who sought the way to revive him and become the Dark Commander's chief lieutenant. Investigating the mysterious Steve Howard, who looked exactly like the dead Steve Trevor, Bradley realized that "Howard" could be a reincarnated Steve Trevor. Bradley kidnapped Trevor and used his magically restored life force to restore the Dark Commander, who promptly killed Bradley and siphoned off enough of Trevor's life force that he died a second time.
The Warhead	Wonder Woman #251 (January 1979)	Munitions expert who sells his inventions to the highest bidder—but not before demonstrating the effectiveness of each invention in a heavily populated area. An unknown accident left him a cyborg, with a helmet shaped like a missile. Stopped by Diana and her replacement as Wonder Woman, Orana, from demonstrating his "clean neutron bomb", but not before he killed Orana.
The Bushmaster	Wonder Woman #255 (May 1979)	Assassin with electrical equipment he uses to induce others to kill for him.
Martin Markham	Wonder Woman #259 (September 1979)	A New York marketing genius, partner in the firm of Markham, Menditz, and Monroe, hired by Mars, the God of War in an effort to discredit Wonder Woman and pave the way for his eventual rule over mankind.
The Prime Planner and the Cartel	Wonder Woman #262 (December 1979)	Slowly revealed to be behind a series of assassination attempts on Wonder Woman's life, hiring assassins like the Bushmaster, El Gaucho, Lumberjack, the Red Fang, and the Changeling, the Prime Planner was unmasked as Morgan Tracy, Diana's former boss and head of the UN Crisis Bureau. The Cartel was later revealed to have been hired by Kobra.
El Gaucho	Wonder Woman #263 (January 1980)	One of five assassins controlled by a mysterious entity called the Prime Planner. He originated from the wild pampas of South America and dressed much like South American gauchos. He is equipped with a flying silver robot horse, an electrified lasso, projectiles, and bolas which consist of three balls attached to a long rope that he throws at his victims.
Perfection	Wonder Woman #265 (March 1980)	Actually a foe of Wonder Girl, Perfection was really Miss Maple, secretary to Loren Jupiter, who attempted to lure Donna Troy into a trap to force her to reveal the secrets of the Amazons.
The Changeling	Wonder Woman #268 (June 1980)	A master criminal from Europe who specializes in disguises, he was a freelance assassin until persuaded by the Prime Planner's Cartel to join them for even greater profit.
The Red Dragon	Wonder Woman #284 (October 1981)	Leader of Chinese terrorist organization dedicated to a return to the values of pre-modern feudal China, who paradoxically used advanced technology.
Karl Schlagel, "the Knife"	Wonder Woman #308 (October 1983)	A Nazi scientist obsessed with researching the psychic power of Gypsies, Schlagel was pursued by Nazi hunter Zenna Persik. Schlagel developed machinery that allowed him to wield the psychic powers of Gypsy children hooked up to it.
The Ytirflirks	Wonder Woman #311 (January 1984)	A race of giant aliens who used another race as their mechanics and slaves. Their slaves escaped and crash-landed in Siberia and became known in legend as gremlins for stealing equipment from aircraft.
Eros	Wonder Woman #317 (July 1984)	The God of Love; escaped from suspended animation, into which he had been placed for his own good, and obsessively pursued Wonder Woman. It was revealed that Eros' spirit had been used to reanimate Steve Trevor's body and lived as Trevor during his time under the alias "Steve Howard". His madness threatened Paradise Island, leading to the accidental overload of the Purple Ray into a destructive mechanism, until the ray's healing powers removed his memories of his time as Trevor.

==== Post-Crisis ====
Villain	First appearance	Description
Baron von Nastraed	Wonder Woman Special #1 (March 1992)	Dictator of Balkan country Pan Balgravia, who sought a metahuman female powerful enough to become the Earth host for the bride of the demon Drax, who in turn used enchantments to make von Nastraed's troops superstrong and able to move silently.
Drax	Wonder Woman Special #1 (March 1992)	A demon from a hellish dimension who sought to find a superhuman female body for his lover, Barremargox, to possess. He allied with the mystical Baron von Nastraed and empowered his soldiers to capture Barbara Ann Minerva, a.k.a. the Cheetah. After the Cheetah's torture reverted her to her human state, Drax and Nastraed planned to use Wonder Woman's body, but failed when the Amazon was able to trick them. Minerva, regaining her Cheetah powers due to a drop of blood from Deathstroke, jumped into the portal leading to Barremargox, which severed the connection and killed Drax.
Barremargox	Wonder Woman (vol. 2) #63 (June 1992)	A demon from a hellish dimension and Drax's bride. Drax searched for a powerful female body for Barremargox to inhabit, and eventually captured the Cheetah. However, the Cheetah could not withstand the torture needed for the ceremony, so Drax instead planned to use Wonder Woman's body. Barremargox watched as Drax battled Wonder Woman and Deathstroke, but when Deathstroke was injured by Baron von Nastraed, the Cheetah regained her powers and hurled herself into Barremargox's portal, killing Drax.
The Central Processor of Death	Wonder Woman (vol. 2) #74 (May 1993)	Brian Elliot was a computer genius who was severely abused by his father, but was led to believe his mother was responsible. Fused himself with “nearly-living” circuits that briefly gave him electrical powers, until he was nearly slain by the White Magician.
Dickie Loper	Wonder Woman (vol. 2) #74 (May 1993)	Crackhead who obtained highly advanced gun technology.
The Doomkiller	Wonder Woman (vol. 2) #77 (August 1993)	Oliver Darr was a low-level mobster frustrated at his lowly status in the underworld and Inspector Indelicato's use of him as a snitch, until he was armed by Ares Buchanan with a gun that created a singularity.
The Dreadnought	Wonder Woman (vol. 2) #85 (April 1994)	John Naissi was a thug working for the Mob and looking to rise within the ranks when he accepted a power-up from the White Magician, turning him into a bulletproof werecat.
Salvo	Wonder Woman (vol. 2) #85 (April 1994)	A Mob enforcer empowered by the White Magician with the ability to fire energy blasts from his hands.
Rockface	Wonder Woman (vol. 2) #87 (June 1994)	One of the many thugs in Paulie Longo's organized crime operation powered up by the White Magician, Rockface was covered with a rocky surface and was super-strong.
Plaasma	Wonder Woman (vol. 2) #87 (June 1994)	One of the many thugs in Paulie Longo's organized crime operation powered up by the White Magician, Plaasma had an elastic body that could generate fire.
Mean Jake	Wonder Woman (vol. 2) #87 (June 1994)	Pimp in Paulie Longo's organized crime operation, Mean Jake had one hand replaced with a powerful metal claw.
Involute the Conqueror	Wonder Woman (vol. 2) #97 (May 1995)	A South Vietnamese war psychopath named Garcia who has altered strength due to chemical enhancements and experimental projects.
Blue Ice	Wonder Woman (vol. 2) #154 (March 2000)	A female criminal with the ability to amplify the radioactive elements of a person's blood, causing death. She was killed by Nubia with the magic lasso.
Doctor Echo	Wonder Woman (vol. 2) #154 (March 2000)	A male criminal with the ability to magnify ambient energy. Although he and his lover, Blue Ice, were pawns of Ahriman, Doctor Echo abandoned the plot after Blue Ice was killed by Nu'Bia. He joined her in the Underworld.
Scylla	Wonder Woman (vol. 2) #191 (June 2003)	The creature of Greek mythology, Scylla was recruited by the Roman goddess Diana to attack the Amazons of Paradise Island. Imbued with greater powers, Scylla gained the ability to turn any living creature to stone. Wonder Woman battled Scylla and defeated her by decapitating each of her heads with her tiara.
Briareos	Wonder Woman (vol. 2) #212 (March 2005)	One of the Hecatoncheires like Cottus. Zeus recruited Briareos as his champion to battle Athena's champion, Wonder Woman. Wonder Woman used the head of Medusa to transform Briareos to stone, winning the battle.
The Empousai	Wonder Woman (vol. 2) #215 (June 2005)	Serpentine demons thought to be children of Hecate. Two of the Empousai, Lamiai and Mormolykeia, were encountered by Wonder Woman, Wonder Girl, and Ferdinand as they traveled to the Underworld to retrieve Hermes. Lamiai, who planned to devour Wonder Girl, was killed by Ares. Mormolykeia, Ferdinand's captor, was defeated by Wonder Woman.
The Ichor	Wonder Woman (vol. 3) #18 (May 2008)	An extremely powerful alien race said to be the blood relatives of the gods of 100 different worlds. The Ichor passed judgment on the Khund and set about destroying their homeworld, committing planet-wide genocide, until Wonder Woman and Etta Candy intervened.

==== The New 52 & DC Rebirth ====
Villain	First appearance	Description
Andres Cadulo	Wonder Woman (vol. 5) #3 (September 2016)	A worshiper of the plant god Urzkartaga, Cadulo was responsible for kidnapping several young African girls to turn them into Urzkartaga's brides. He later tried to sacrifice Steve Trevor so that Urzkartaga could be given physical form. His plan was thwarted by Wonder Woman and the Cheetah.
Doctor Shannon Crawford	Wonder Woman (vol. 5) #26 (September 2017)	Wonder Woman's personal doctor. Doctor Crawford examined Wonder Woman after each mission she was sent on. However, Dr. Crawford desired to get close to Wonder Woman to gain her amazonian immortality as she was suffering from a fatal disease. Wonder Woman battled Dr. Crawford, and the doctor ultimately took her own life rather than return to her original form.
Abolith	Wonder Woman (vol. 5) #28 (October 2017)	One of many bounty hunters sent by the government to capture Wonder Woman to use her DNA to cure others. Abolith confronted Wonder Woman alongside Cheshire, Plastique, Cat Eye, and Baundo.
Baundo	Wonder Woman (vol. 5) #28 (October 2017)	One of many bounty hunters sent by the government to capture Wonder Woman to use her DNA to cure others. Baundo confronted Wonder Woman alongside Cheshire, Plastique, Cat Eye, and Abolith.
Cat Eye	Wonder Woman (vol. 5) #28 (October 2017)	One of many bounty hunters sent by the government to capture Wonder Woman to use her DNA to cure others. Cat Eye claimed to be an incarnation of the Egyptian goddess Bast, and could emit lasers from her eyes. She confronted Wonder Woman alongside Cheshire, Plastique, Baundo, and Abolith.
Apate	Batman/Superman: World's Finest #30 (October 2024)	Goddess of deceit and the twin sister of Dolos.

=== Teams ===
In chronological order (with issue and date of first appearance)

Team	First appearance	Description
The Children of Ares	Wonder Woman #2	The Duke of Deception, the Count of Conquest and the Earl of Greed attacked Wonder Woman collectively and separately throughout the Golden Age. The Duke of Deception became a significant recurring enemy into the Silver Age as well, and his daughter Lya also fought Wonder Woman.
The Children of Ares	Wonder Woman #183 (July/August 1969)	Ares battled the Amazons and a depowered Diana along with Phobos, Deimos and Eris for control of the power to conquer all dimensions of reality. This version of the Children of Ares reappeared Post-Crisis.
Villainy Inc.	Wonder Woman #28	A revolt on Transformation Island led to the escape and team-up of some of Wonder Woman's most dangerous female foes: Eviless, the Blue Snowman, the Cheetah, Doctor Poison, Giganta, Hypnota, Queen Clea and Zara. Villainy, Inc. was the first team of supervillains published in the DC Universe.
Villainy Inc.	Wonder Woman (vol. 2) #179	When all of Atlantis disappeared, Queen Clea assembled a new Villainy, Inc. to take over Skartaris. This new team consisted of Cyborgirl, Doctor Poison, Giganta, Jinx and Trinity.
Villainy Inc.	Wonder Woman (vol. 1) #784 (April 2022)	An organization led by Hera. Doctor Psycho commands a branch of Villainy Inc. which consists of Doctor Poison, Professor Calculus, Sweetheart, and the enigmatic Twin Shadows.
Academy of Arch-Villains	Wonder Woman #141 (October 1963)	The Angle Man, Mouse Man and the Human Fireworks assembled to destroy Wonder Woman.
The Children of Cronus	Wonder Woman (vol. 2) #145 (June 1999)	The Titans that empowered Devastation. The roster includes Oblivion, Slaughter, Arc, Disdain, Titan, and Harrier.
The Gorgons	Wonder Woman (vol. 2) #201 (April 2004)	The serpent-haired sisters of Greek Mythology, consisting of Medusa, Euryale and Stheno. Although all three Gorgons have fought Wonder Woman on separate occasions, the trio banded together after Circe aided Euryale and Stheno in reviving their sister Medusa.
The Circle	Wonder Woman (vol. 3) #14 (January 2008)	A circle of four Amazons chosen to be Hippolyta's special guards, Myrto, Charis, Philomela and Alkyone were imprisoned for years following their misguided plot to save the Amazon nation from a predicted "dragon" by attempting to kill the infant Diana the night after she was given life from clay. They were freed when Captain Nazi invaded Themyscira; wielding magical weapons, they tried again to kill Diana.
The Morrigan	Wonder Woman #605 (January 2011)	A triumvirate of war goddesses who have set their sights on exterminating all of the Amazons. The Morrigan consisted of Anann, Bellona and Enyo.
Godwatch	Wonder Woman #9 (December 2016)	An organization led by Veronica Cale focused on locating Themyscira. Godwatch's membership included Cale, Doctor Cyber, Doctor Poison, Circe, Phobos and Deimos. The Cheetah was formerly a member of the group until she defected with the aid of Wonder Woman.
Team Poison	Wonder Woman #13 (February 2017)	A group of female mercenaries founded by the Maru family and currently led by Colonel Marina Maru. The group consists of members Kit Cox, Juliette, Ray, Sara, Shar and Snake. Because they follow Maru's orders, they most often are employed as foot soldiers for Godwatch.
Dark Gods	Dark Nights: Metal #6 (May 2018)	A pantheon of gods from a dark, unknown universe. There are 13 total gods in the pantheon, with six of them transported to Wonder Woman's universe after the events of Dark Nights: Metal.
Four Horsewomen	Wonder Woman #755 (July 2020)	A quartet of some of Wonder Woman's deadliest enemies led by Paula von Gunther, who had taken up the Warmaster mantle. Other members included Devastation, Genocide, and a female ogre version of Armageddon.

== Absolute Wonder Woman enemies ==
In 2024, DC Comics created the Absolute Universe, including Absolute Wonder Woman. Several of Wonder Woman's key adversaries from the main DC Universe have been reimagined for this alternate universe, with some characters (such as Circe) adopting an entirely different role in Wonder Woman's mythos.

Villain	First appearance	Description
Apollo	Absolute Wonder Woman #1 (December 2024)	God of the sun, Apollo delivered the infant Diana to Circe in Hell under Zeus's decree to punish the Amazons. Apollo cursed Circe to never speak the word “Amazon", though Diana ultimately uncovers her true heritage.
Ara	Absolute Wonder Woman #12 (November 2025)	Queen of a race of "fish-men" that Wonder Woman had previously encountered in the maze beneath Area 41. She was captured by Veronica Cale and forced into working with her Suicide Squad, but fled during the mission with Wonder Woman's assistance.
Barbara Ann Minerva	Absolute Wonder Woman #3 (February 2025)	A brilliant archaeologist and one of Diana's closest allies.
Cheetah	Absolute Wonder Woman #12 (November 2025)	Priscilla Rich was a prisoner of G.A.T.E.S. (Global Anti-Terrorism and Emergency Services) who was forced into joining the Suicide Squad to fight Wonder Woman. She was killed by the Eternal Flame during her first mission and used in his blood ritual.
Circe	Absolute Wonder Woman #1 (December 2024)	In this universe, Circe has been reimagined as Diana’s adoptive mother and mentor in Hell, nurturing and training her with magic and guidance.
Clea	Absolute Wonder Woman #9 (August 2025)	A tyrannical Atlantean queen and ruler of the subterranean Maze beneath Area 41. Queen Clea commands an army of "Men-Fish" and confronts Diana while searching for the mysterious siren Petra.
Doctor Poison	Absolute Wonder Woman #8 (July 2025)	A sentient cloud of poisonous gas trapped in an outdated World War II containment suit provided by G.A.T.E.S. She secretly pursues her own agenda despite Director Veronica Cale’s attempts to control her.
Eternal Flame	Absolute Wonder Woman #17 (April 2026)	Giovanni Zatara is Zatanna's father and a powerful magician.
Giganta	Absolute Wonder Woman #12 (November 2025)	Doris Zuel is a super-strong metahuman who can grow to immeasurable heights. She was one of the many prisoners of the government's Area 41, and Director Veronica Cale utilized her as a member of the Suicide Squad to battle Wonder Woman. Wonder Woman used her own magic to match Giganta's massive size which allowed her to defeat the villainess.
Hades	Absolute Wonder Woman #6 (May 2025)	The blue-flamed god of the Underworld. Hades tested Diana’s resolve by capturing Circe and forcing her to face a chimera, ultimately respecting her strength while revealing the intertwined complexities of their pasts.
Hecate	Absolute Wonder Woman #4 (March 2025)	The enigmatic goddess of magic who serves as Diana’s patron, guiding and supporting her in battles against formidable foes like the Tetracide.
Medusa	Absolute Wonder Woman #5 (April 2025)	Medusa has been reimagined as a powerful form Diana takes using Circe’s Lasso of Transformation, which she utilized to confront the kaiju-like Tetracide.
The Tetracide	Absolute Wonder Woman #2 (January 2025)	Also known as "The Four Killer", the Tetracide was a massive, nightmarish entity with four distinct lethal methods, acting as the mastermind behind the Harbingers and threatening Gateway City, forcing Diana to confront it at great personal risk.
Veronica Cale	Absolute Wonder Woman #4 (March 2025)	The director of the secretive government facility Area 41.
Zatanna	Absolute Wonder Woman #12 (November 2025)	Zatanna Zatara is a powerful witch who was captured by Veronica Cale and imprisoned in Area 41.

== Antagonists in other media ==
Wonder Woman villains created in other media, with no appearances in previous or subsequent comics.

Villain	Description	Live-action/Animated media	Performer
Cassandra Loren	Scientist from the future, who plotted to make a fortune by refining and selling an undiscovered atomic mineral, called Cabrium 90	Wonder Woman (TV series)	Joan Van Ark
Abner Smith	Wealthy extortionist and terrorist who steals code books with classified information about U.S. spies	Wonder Woman (1974 film)	Ricardo Montalbán
Count Cagliostro	Mage who claims to be an alchemist	Wonder Woman (TV series)	Dick Gautier
Hans Eichler	Nazi agent who brainwashes a gorilla named Gargantua	Wonder Woman (TV series)	Robert Loggia
The Falcon	High-priced Irish mercenary who sought to steal scientific research for tectonic manipulation, but unwittingly carried bubonic plague	Wonder Woman (TV series)	Robert Reed
Formicida	An environmentalist who develops the power to control superswarms of ants, using them to destroy skyscrapers and terrorize companies which despoil the environment	Wonder Woman (TV series)	Lorene Yarnell
Erica Belgard	Hans Eichler's assistant who trains Gargantua to kill Wonder Woman as a means to impress the Nazi High Command and secure funding for her animal behavior research	Wonder Woman (TV series)	Gretchen Corbett
Gault	Wealthy man whose disembodied brain develops telekinetic powers which he uses in a search for a new body	Wonder Woman (TV series)	John Carradine
Hera	Queen of the Gods, whose jealousy of Aphrodite led her to cause earthquakes, threatening Aphrodite's temple on the planet Caltos	Super Friends ("Battle of the Gods")	Marlene Aragon
Takeo Ishida	Powerful telepath with a grudge against Wonder Woman for failing to save his brother in Japan during World War II	Wonder Woman (TV series)	Yuki Shimoda
Wotan	Nazi agent who plots to sabotage American economy with counterfeit money.	Wonder Woman (TV series)	James Olson
Carolyn Hamilton	A former police officer who now illegally works as part of a clandestine organization known as "The Movement". When she unexpectedly encounters Steve who once rescued her, she is torn between the Movement's nefarious agenda and her feelings for him.	Wonder Woman (TV series)	Jayne Kennedy
Silas Lockhart	A land developer who abducts a trained dolphin and uses it to sink an oil tanker which will lower beachfront property values.	Wonder Woman (TV series)	Nicolas Coster
Mariposa	Rich, powerful madman who abducts Olympic athletes to compete for his fictional country	Wonder Woman (TV series)	Henry Gibson
The Skrill	Alien swarm of mindstealing parasites	Wonder Woman (TV series)	Various
Solano	Rich, powerful, and deadly terrorist who constructs robot duplicate and commands vast military resources	Wonder Woman (TV series)	Fritz Weaver
Arthur Chapman	Notorious scientist who has the ability to cause volcanoes to erupt	Wonder Woman (TV series)	Roddy McDowall
Bernard Havitol	A criminal who attempts to acquire the memories of the best computers in the world and views IRAC for his next addition	Wonder Woman (TV series)	Ross Martin
Hamlin Rule	Rock star who hypnotizes his groupies into robbing the box offices of his concerts and abducts Joe Atkinson's daughter	Wonder Woman (TV series)	Martin Mull
Evan Robley	An international jewelry thief who steals crown jewels from the Malakar embassy	Wonder Woman (TV series)	David Hedison
Adele Kobler	A presumed deceased pop singer who turns up alive and well. She resorts to abducting him and even considers murder.	Wonder Woman (TV series)	Kate Woodville
Raleigh Crichton	Criminal mastermind who abducts a pop star idol named Lane Kincaid and replaces him with his twin brother Michael	Wonder Woman (TV series)	Albert Paulsen
William Mayfield	A thief who steals a super-sensitive listening device and priceless historical documents from a government research laboratory	Wonder Woman (TV series)	Raymond St. Jacques
Syrene	Sorceress who battled Superman and Wonder Woman in her attempt to secure the Globe of Darkness	Superman (TV series)	B. J. Ward

== Antagonists from comics in other media ==
A number of villains from the comic books have made an appearance, or appearances, in other media featuring Wonder Woman.

Villain	Live-action/Animated media	Performer
Angle Man	Justice League Unlimited	Phil LaMarr
Angle Man	Batman: The Brave and the Bold	—N/a
Ares	Justice League Unlimited	Michael York
Ares	Wonder Woman (2009 film)	Alfred Molina
Ares	Wonder Woman (2017 film)	David Thewlis
Ares	DC Super Hero Girls	Fred Tatasciore
Ares	Harley Quinn (TV series)	—N/a
Baroness von Gunther	Wonder Woman (TV series)	Christine Belford
Baroness von Gunther	Batman: The Brave and the Bold	Eliza Schneider
Blue Snowman	Harley Quinn (TV series)	—N/a
Blue Snowman	My Adventures with Superman	—N/a
Veronica Cale	Wonder Woman (2011 TV pilot)	Elizabeth Hurley
Veronica Cale	Wonder Woman: Bloodlines	Constance Zimmer
Veronica Cale	Harley Quinn (TV series)	Edi Patterson
Cheetah	Challenge of the Super Friends	Marlene Aragon
Cheetah	Justice League (TV series)	Sheryl Lee Ralph
Cheetah	Wonder Woman (2009 film)	—N/a
Cheetah	Superman/Batman: Public Enemies	—N/a
Cheetah	Batman: The Brave and the Bold	Morena Baccarin
Cheetah	Super Best Friends Forever	—N/a
Cheetah	Justice League: Doom	Claudia Black
Cheetah	JLA Adventures: Trapped in Time	Erica Luttrell
Cheetah	DC Super Friends	Blaze Berdahl
Cheetah	Justice League: Gods and Monsters	Arif S. Kinchen
Cheetah	Batman Unlimited: Animal Instincts	Laura Bailey
Cheetah	DC Super Hero Girls	Ashley Eckstein
Cheetah	Wonder Woman: Bloodlines	Kimberly Brooks
Cheetah	Harley Quinn (TV series)	Lake Bell
Cheetah	Wonder Woman 1984	Kristen Wiig
Circe	Justice League (TV series)	Rachel York
Circe	Justice League Action	Laura Post
Deimos	Wonder Woman (2009 film)	John DiMaggio
Devastation	Young Justice: Invasion	Diane Delano
Doctor Cyber	Justice League (TV series)	—N/a
Doctor Cyber	Wonder Woman: Bloodlines	Mozhan Marnò
Doctor Poison	Batman: The Brave and the Bold	—N/a
Doctor Poison	Wonder Woman (2017 film)	Elena Anaya
Doctor Poison	Wonder Woman: Bloodlines	Courtenay Taylor
Doctor Psycho	Powerless	Ronnie Zappa
Doctor Psycho	Harley Quinn (TV series)	Tony Hale
Eris	Harley Quinn (TV series)	Jameela Jamil
Giganta	Challenge of the Super Friends	Ruth Forman
Giganta	Legends of the Superheroes	Aleshia Brevard
Giganta	Justice League (TV series)	Jennifer Hale
Giganta	Superman/Batman: Public Enemies	Andrea Romano
Giganta	Batman: The Brave and the Bold	—N/a
Giganta	Lego DC Comics Super Heroes: Justice League vs. Bizarro League	April Winchell
Giganta	Justice League: Gods and Monsters Chronicles	—N/a
Giganta	DC Super Hero Girls	Grey Griffin
Giganta	Wonder Woman: Bloodlines	Kimberly Brooks
Giganta	Harley Quinn (TV series)	Vanessa Marshall
Giganta	Scooby-Doo! and Krypto, Too!	Grey Griffin
Fausta Grables	Wonder Woman (TV series)	Lynda Day George
Fausta Grables	Wonder Woman (2017 film)	Rachel Pickup
Medusa	Challenge of the Super Friends	Shannon Farnon
Medusa	Justice League (TV series)	Laraine Newman
Medusa	Wonder Woman: Bloodlines	Cree Summer
Minister Blizzard	Harley Quinn (TV series)	—N/a
Queen of Fables	Harley Quinn (TV series)	Wanda Sykes
Silver Swan	Wonder Woman: Bloodlines	Marie Avgeropoulos

== See also ==
- List of Wonder Woman supporting characters
- List of Superman enemies
- List of Batman family enemies
- List of Blue Beetle enemies
- List of Flash enemies
- Rogues
- List of Green Lantern enemies
- List of Aquaman enemies
