= Duke of Deception =

DC Comics character

- The Duke of Deception as depicted in Wonder Woman #788 (August 2022). Art by Emanuela Lupacchino.

Publication information
- Publisher: DC Comics
- First appearance: Wonder Woman #2 (Fall 1942)
- Created by: William Moulton Marston (writer); Harry G. Peter (artist)

In-story information
- Alter ego: Dolos; Thomas Byde (The Legend of Wonder Woman)
- Abilities: Mastery of manipulation and deceitful strategy; Illusion generation; Astral projection; Possession; Necromancy

The Duke of Deception is a fictional character appearing in DC Comics publications and related media, commonly as a recurring adversary of the superhero Wonder Woman. Based on Dolos, the Roman mythological deity of deceit and lies, he debuted in 1942's Wonder Woman #2 as a treacherous operative of the war god Mars/Ares. He would become one of Wonder Woman's most persistent foes, appearing regularly in her adventures throughout the Golden, Silver and Bronze Age of Comics. Evolving into an antagonist independent of Ares, he has frequently confronted Wonder Woman and her allies as a powerful autonomous threat with his own aims of conquest.

For the greater part of his publication history, the Duke's origin and identity was not established, nor was his precise position within DC Comics' mythological pantheon. The 2020 feature film Wonder Woman 1984 suggested that the Duke had a specific mythological antecedent, Dolos. In 2022's Wonder Woman #788, writers Michael W. Conrad and Becky Cloonan confirm this; the Duke identifies himself by name as Dolos, as does Wonder Woman, suggesting unchronicled previous interactions in DC's Rebirth-era continuity.

== Publication history ==
=== Creation ===
The Golden Age Duke of Deception gets walloped in Wonder Woman #2 (1942); art by Harry G. Peter.

The Duke of Deception first appeared in 1942's Wonder Woman #2, written by Wonder Woman creator William Moulton Marston and illustrated by Harry G. Peter. Marston was a psychologist who conceived many of Wonder Woman's early foes as allegories for psychological motifs. As such, the Duke of Deception represented the exploitative power of duplicity, particularly as it relates to misogyny and patriarchal control.

=== Golden Age ===
More than most comic book characters, the Duke's visual design has varied widely since his creation. He has sported a series of looks so disparate that, from decade to decade, he barely resembles the same character. Peter drew him as a diminutive, wizened, near-toothless figure with a hooked nose and Greco-Roman armor. Though in his earliest stories, his armor was blue and bronze, but varied in color in later appearances.

=== Silver Age ===
The Silver Age Duke in Wonder Woman #148 (1964); art by Ross Andru.

By 1960, his look took a sharp sci-fi turn, giving him both a larger, sturdier stature as well as an outer-space get-up. Without much narrative explanation, he was also given green skin, although in this look's debut, the character's costume was green, while his skin tone was rendered as yellow. Usually outfitted in red tights, cowl, collared cape, boots and gloves, the Silver Age Duke bore little outward resemblance to his Golden Age self, other than continuing to sport a prominently aquiline nose. However, this Silver Age version now had a full set of teeth, and with his interstellar garb, struck the figure of a space-age supervillain.

=== Bronze Age ===
The Bronze Age Duke is captured in Wonder Woman #217 (1975); art by Dick Dillin and Vince Colletta.

By 1975, the Duke's design was again altered, giving him normal-colored skin and hair resembling horns. Wonder Woman #217 includes a two-page pullout reusing frames from several of the Duke of Deception's Golden Age appearances, all featuring art by Harry G. Peter. Written as if narrated by the Duke himself, the pullout divulges the villain's early clashes with Wonder Woman, establishing an Earth-1 origin story paralleling that of the Golden Age Duke of Earth-2. Despite differences in their outward appearances, the wizened Duke in the pullout is established as the same figure as the tuxedoed Duke in the issue's lead story.

The Duke as a handsome warrior in Wonder Woman #239 (1978); art by José Delbo.

Several years later in 1978's Wonder Woman #239-240, writer Gerry Conway provides a subtle retcon of the Golden Age Duke of Deception's origin. In a story taking place on Earth-2 in 1942, the Duke is shown to be a handsome darkhaired demigod in indigo armor. By the end of the tale, as punishment for fumbling a planned plot against Wonder Woman, the war god Mars transforms the Duke into the familiar crooked, toothless figure depicted in his earliest Golden Age comic book appearances.

The Duke of Deception made his final Bronze Age appearance a year later in 1979's Wonder Woman #254, in a story taking place on Earth-1. Though ostensibly the same Earth-1 figure as the tuxedoed Duke from the early-70s, without explanation he is here presented as identical in appearance to the scrawny Golden Age Earth-2 Duke from the end of Wonder Woman #240. Both Wonder Woman #240 and #254 were illustrated by José Delbo.

=== Who's Who in the DC Universe ===
Between March 1985 and April 1987, DC Comics published Who's Who in the DC Universe, an encyclopedia-style limited series cataloguing the company's characters. The entry for the Duke of Deception featured in issue #7 (September 1985) is somewhat anomalous for Who's Who in that it offers a visual representation of the character that had never actually appeared in a DC Comics publication. Instead, it blends various disparate designs from the Duke's history into a single composite likeness, mixing elements from several of his Golden and Bronze Age looks. In an illustration by José Delbo and inker Bob Smith, the Duke is presented with the body of the Mephistophelian middle-aged man who debuted in Wonder Woman #217. However, he is outfitted in a more svelt version of the Greco-Roman armor from the character's original depiction. This armor is not pale blue but indigo, like that worn by the Earth-2 Duke in Wonder Woman #239-240.

=== Modern Age ===
After DC Comics rebooted its continuity in 1985 (in a publication event known as Crisis on Infinite Earths), Wonder Woman, her supporting characters and many of her foes were re-imagined and reintroduced. The Duke of Deception, though initially absent in this revised set of storylines, would ultimately make a handful of appearances, both in DC's continuity. In these outings, the Duke's look has closely resembled his 1985 Who's Who composite.

Thomas Byde, the Duke of Deception in The Legend of Wonder Woman (vol. 2) #24; art by Renae De Liz.

=== 21st Century ===
==== 2010s ====
In 2016, a new version of the Duke of Deception was introduced in The Legend of Wonder Woman, an Eisner Award-nominated ongoing digital series retelling Wonder Woman's origin in an alternate continuity. A champion of Ares and Hades, the Duke of Deception is presented as the first major adversary Wonder Woman faces after leaving her home on the island of Themyscira. Once again a handsome figure in Greco-Roman armor (this time with flaming red hair), the new Duke is a master of necromancy, as well as a master of deceit.

== Fictional character biography ==
=== Pre-Crisis ===
Little is known about the true history of the Duke of Deception. He appears to be a minor deity in the Greek pantheon, possibly Dolos, a god of trickery and lies. He is drafted by Mars to battle Wonder Woman. He uses his powers to spread falsehoods to provoke humanity into conflict and war.

The Duke of Deception, along with the Count of Conquest and the Earl of Greed, two other enemies of Wonder Woman, was a main lieutenant of the god Mars.

The Duke of Deception sends his astral form to inspire military and government leaders with duplicitous thoughts that could lead to war. His contributions to World War II include "persuad[ing] ... the Rising Sun (Japan) to make peace talk at Washington while they struck with deadly venom at Pearl Harbor" and "show[ing] the addled Adolf Hitler how to cultivate Russia's friendship until the hour arrived to attack".

On the war god's interplanetary base on the planet Mars, the Duke of Deception operates the Lie Factory, which uses slaves, spirits from different planets such as Earth and Saturn that inhabit bodies, to craft deceptions for a variety of stratagems. Other slaves are used for gladiator conflicts. When Wonder Woman's astral form traveled to Mars to rescue Steve Trevor, the Duke of Deception recognized her and revealed her identity to Mars after she won in the arena. He gave advice to Mars to pretend not to know who she was to trap her. However, Wonder Woman was able to rescue Steve, overcome Mars and his soldiers, and escape to Earth. The Duke of Deception was the second of Mars' lieutenants sent to capture Wonder Woman, refusing at first as he said his servants were writing propaganda for the Nazis and Japanese and he could not capture Wonder Woman without their help. Wonder Woman was captured by an agent of his, Naha, with her magic lasso after being given a fake lasso. She was taken onto a ship, where she was left bound hand and foot, along with being gagged and blindfolded with plaster. Wonder Woman was able to escape with the help of Etta Candy, who she telepathically contacted. The Duke of Deception tried to convince Hirohito to cause more war in Hawaii by disguising himself as a General, but Wonder Woman foiled his plan to cause further war with the help of Etta Candy and sent his phantom form fleeing back to Mars in the form of a slave girl. He was then imprisoned by Mars, his imprisonment causing Hirohito to speak truthfully to the Italian Ambassador. The Duke of Deception was released when Wonder Woman was brought back in chains by the Count of Conquest. The Duke of Deception enlists the aid of the women-hating Doctor Psycho after finding women are being used in the War Effort, hoping to continue the practice of inequality. After repeated failures, Mars strips him of his mighty appearance, leaving him a weak, toothless man. He was imprisoned with the female slaves, but convinced them to rebel and briefly ruled Mars, imprisoning the god Mars. He took over the Moon and was able to drug the goddess Diana, but was defeated by Wonder Woman.

He eventually begins working independently from Mars, and continues to unsuccessfully battle Wonder Woman. In the late 1950s, he received a makeover with other members of the Wonder Woman cast. He now wore an orange and black costume and hood and, characteristic of a master of illusion, the color of his skin changed from white to yellow. He tries to attack the entire Solar System of Earth-1 after capturing Wonder Woman and Steve with a key that transforms into a spaceship which paralyzes them and leaves Earth. But Wonder Woman is able to escape using her bracelet to turn off the device and destroy all of his fleet which were massing at different planets. The Duke of Deception's own ship crashes into an Earth satellite, although he made numerous Silver Age reappearances.

The Duke of Deception's daughter, Lya, is a "mistress of lies" who attempts to double-cross her own father. She captured Wonder Woman and created a phantasm of her to steal Earth's atomic weapons. Wonder Woman escaped and captured Lya and her followers.

After the events of Crisis on Infinite Earths, this version of the Duke of Deception is erased from history.

=== Post-Crisis ===
A new version of the Duke of Deception reappears, with a caption box describing him as "The Duke of Deception, whose power of illusion made him the War God's most trusted disciple".

== Powers and abilities ==
The Duke of Deception can create illusions and delusions in the minds of others, thereby driving them insane. In addition, he can envelop himself in an illusory image which changes his physical appearance. He has used this ability to disguise himself as Wonder Woman, Paula von Gunther, and Professor Dekon. He can also send his astral form invisibly to military and government leaders, inspiring them with thoughts of duplicity which they take to be their own.

The Duke of Deception has also made use of advanced technology in his plans to attack Earth and destroy Wonder Woman. He attempted to shrink a Martian invasion fleet into a small box from which they would emerge in enlarged form, and he used the shrinking technology again to shrink down Skyscraper City. He has also employed a solar death ray, a force field that sealed in Washington, D.C., and also was a portal for an interplanetary invasion fleet, a "brain-wave deceiver" that could scramble a victim's perception of fantasy and reality, and a "gigantic inter-stellar cannon" that was able to target Wonder Woman's invisible jet. He also claimed to have altered Wonder Girl's face with technology he had employed in the past on Medusa and Dr. Jekyll's Mr. Hyde persona, but he may have been lying.

== Other versions ==
The Duke, in a look inspired by his 1985 Who's Who entry, as he appears in Scooby-Doo Team-Up #10 (2014); art by Dario Brizuela.

- The Duke of Deception appears in the Super Friends #28.
- The Duke of Deception appears in digital-first crossover Scooby-Doo Team-Up.
- The Duke of Deception appears in the digital-first origin story The Legend of Wonder Woman.

== See also ==
- List of Wonder Woman enemies
