= Mask (DC Comics) =

The Mask
- The Mask in Sensational Wonder Woman #14 (April 2021), art by Sanya Anwar.

Publication information
- Publisher: DC Comics
- First appearance: Wonder Woman #24 (July/August 1947)
- Created by: William Moulton Marston, Harry G. Peter

In-story information
- Alter ego: Nina Close; Natalia Close; Nina Solorzano
- Abilities: Criminal mastermind; Highly skilled marksperson; Technological prowess

The Mask is a fictional character appearing in DC Comics publications and related media, commonly as a recurring adversary of the superhero Wonder Woman. Created by writer William Moulton Marston and artist Harry G. Peter, the character debuted in 1947 in Wonder Woman #24 as the villainous alter-ego of Nina Close, a victim of domestic spousal abuse suffering from dissociative identity disorder. The blonde-haired Nina was timid and quiet, but her alternate personality, the dark-haired Mask, was ruthless, violent and cruel. The Mask's primary modus operandi was to trap her victims in grisly BDSM-style torture masks rigged to release acid into their throats unless her demands were met. After DC Comics rebooted its continuity in 1985 (a publication event known as the Crisis on Infinite Earths), Wonder Woman and her supporting characters were re-imagined. Though originally absent from this revised mythos, the character was reintroduced in 2007's Wonder Woman (vol. 3) Annual #1, written by Allan Heinberg and illustrated by Terry Dodson and Rachel Dodson, as a masked anti-hero dispensing violent retribution against men who abuse women. She would get a post-Rebirth reformulation by writer/artist Sanya Anwar in 2021's Sensational Wonder Woman #13-14 as Natalia Close (née Nina Solorzano), a troubled social media personality and influencer who develops the lethal alter-ego of a criminal mastermind named the Mask.

This Mask is distinct from the character of the same name appearing in Dark Horse Comics publications and related media.

== Context ==
William Moulton Marston, the Mask's creator, was a psychologist who conceived many of Wonder Woman's Golden Age foes as allegories for psychological and moral motifs, but he also used villain characters to represent mental illness. As such, the Mask (as well as Wonder Woman's nemesis the Cheetah, a more recognizable Marston creation debuting four years earlier) illustrated then-current perspectives on what is now understood as dissociative identity disorder. Unlike the Cheetah, whose disassociation was idiopathic, the vicious Golden Age Mask was the product of a very specific trauma: spousal abuse. Contemporary reformulations of the character by writers Allan Heinberg and Sanya Anwar have reflected changing worldviews regarding mental illness, but have maintained the emergence of the Mask persona as a protective response to trauma. Heinberg's Mask, like Marston's, was an apparent abuse victim. Anwar's Mask has a more complex psychological makeup, struggling with several dysfunctional familial relationships and stress related to the upkeep of a seemingly perfect social media persona.

The Mask debuted in Wonder Woman #24, which was published in July 1947, shortly after Marston's death.

== Fictional character biography ==
=== Pre-Crisis ===
The Golden Age Mask grapples with Wonder Woman on the cover of Wonder Woman #24 (July 1947), art by Harry G. Peter.

The Mask was a bold villainess who trapped her prey in rigged trick masks which would release deadly hydrogen cyanide gas into her victims' mouths unless the masks were unlatched with a special key.

Wonder Woman was drawn into the emotionally intense battles between millionaire industrialist and amateur trekker Brutus Close, his frail and tormented wife Nina, and his associate Fancy Framer one day when she was flying back from Paradise Island and came across a plane in distress. Wonder Woman rescued the woman piloting the plane and landed in her invisible plane's hidden hangar, an abandoned barn in the outskirts of Washington, D.C. The woman pilot fled, but Wonder Woman investigated the plane wreckage and discovered a purse belonging to Nina Close.

In her guise as Diana Prince, Wonder Woman delivered the purse to the Close residence, where she immediately realized the frail Nina Close could not possibly be the pilot. While there, she witnessed an argument between Brutus Close and Fancy Framer, bold outdoor adventurer hired to lead Close's expeditions. When Close accused Framer of stealing and crashing one of his planes, Framer left and angrily threatened to expose him as a fraud to the press which he so extensively courted.

Diana was called back to the Close residence with word that the Mask had struck. A woman calling herself the Mask has invaded the Close residence and trapped Brutus Close in a fatally rigged mask, demanding $1 million in exchange for his freedom from the mask. Her ransom note insisted that he deliver the funds to the top of the Empire State Building.

When military intelligence officers Steve Trevor and Diana Prince accompanied Close from Washington to New York to deliver the ransom, they were shocked to see a woman fly by in Wonder Woman's invisible plane and lasso Close and the ransom money.

The Silver Age Mask in Justice League of America #35 (May 1965), art by Mike Sekowsky.

The Mask demanded more money from Close and similarly captured the Holliday College girls, demanding money from military intelligence.

Because her invisible plane had been stolen and used to capture Brutus Close, Wonder Woman deduced that the Mask had to be Fancy Framer, who she assumed to be the pilot of the distressed plane and thus knew the location of the invisible plane. She was shocked to realize that the Mask was really Close's wife Nina, a frail and tormented mouse of a woman who had developed a split personality during her marriage to the domineering Brutus Close.

The Mask reappeared in the Silver Age when a magical duplicate of her and several other opponents of the Justice League of America was used in an elaborate plot by the Demons Three to trick the JLA and free themselves. Close herself was still institutionalized at the time.

=== Post-Crisis ===
The Mask has reappeared in Wonder Woman (vol. 3) Annual #1 as a masked gun-wielding villain. Narrative captions describe her as "The Mask, an abused wife who murdered her husband and now uses his fortune to empower similarly victimized wives and mothers".

More recently the Mask returned in the stand-alone series Sensational Wonder Woman #7 where she was the socialite wife of a pesticide mogul called Natalia Close. Despite her strong social media following Natalia had low self esteem and suffered a breakdown from the constant media pressure on her as the wife of a powerful business man. She kidnapped her young son, although everybody assumed the two had been taken for ransom. By reading Natalia's diary, Wonder Woman tracked her mental decline into her 'Mask' persona who attempted to kill her neglectful mother in a house fire although Wonder Woman saved her. The Mask then tried to kill here husband by feeding him his new dangerous toxic pesticide but was again stopped by Wonder Woman who managed to also persuade the Mask to give up her son lest he be tied to his mother's wrongdoings, but failed to apprehend the Mask herself who escaped.

== Other characters named Mask ==
Several other characters named Mask have made minor appearances throughout DC history. They have fought Zatara, Spy Smasher, Green Arrow, Mr. Scarlet and Pinky the Whiz Kid, Johnny Quick, Ted Kord, Doll Man, Plastic Man, and Hourman.

== See also ==
- List of Wonder Woman enemies
