= Fraus =

Goddess in Roman mythology

In Roman mythology, Fraus was the goddess of personification of treachery and fraud.

She was daughter of Orcus and Night (Nyx). She was depicted with a woman's face, the body of a snake, and on her tail the sting of a scorpion.

Fraus is an alternative name for Mercury, the god of theft (among other things). She is alternatively described as Mercury's helper.. Her Greek equivalent was Apate.
