= Shadowspire =

Fictional criminal organization in DC Comics

- Deathstroke investigates Shadowspire, art by Mike Collins.

Publication information
- Publisher: DC Comics
- First appearance: Deathstroke #53 (June 1995)
- Created by: Tom Joyner (writer); Mike Collins (artist)

In-story information
- Type of organization: Organized crime
- Leader(s): Baron Blitzkrieg
- Agent(s): Kodrescu; Mourn; Steelhawk

Shadowspire is a fictional criminal organization which appears in DC Comics. Their first recorded appearance is in Deathstroke #53. The group was created by Tom Joyner and Mike Collins.

== Fictional team history ==
The symbol of Shadowspire was a black tower against a red sky and set within a black diamond shape. Shadowspire supplied South American drug cartels with the necessary tools of their trade: weapons, transportation, high technology and reliable intelligence. Shadowspire's tentacles penetrate every corrupt government and drug cartel on two continents. They even had the resources and know-how to create their own weaponized viruses.

Through the costumed agent known as Mourn, Shadowspire attempted to unleash the Borgia Plague in Washington, D.C. Their stated objective was "opening new markets". The objective of Mourn's mission was to ensure that the President of the United States and those next in line for succession be killed by the Borgia Plague.

According to Mourn: "Without a central government, the U.S. will disintegrate faster than Yugoslavia. There's so much anger against the federal government — so much tension over race, religion and resources — there'll be a civil war all over the continent inside of six months. The economy will go to hell, and the rest of the world won't be far behind. And guess who profits when anarchy reigns?"

Shadowspire's mysterious "Chief of Shadows" was the Baron (Baron Blitzkrieg), who was, in Mourn's opinion, one of the ten most dangerous men on the planet. Among the Baron's other operatives were Steelhawk and Kodrescu.

The Borgia Plague plot was averted by Deathstroke, but despite Deathstroke's best efforts, Mourn succeeded in placing a bomb in the Capitol Building, an action which culminated in an explosion that killed the assassin and hundreds of workers.

Shadowspire later resurfaces in the pages of Damage, a comic book that was also written by Tom Joyner; they frequently clashed with Damage throughout the series. They more recently resurfaced in Power Company.

== Shadowspire operatives ==
- Baron Blitzkrieg - Baron Reiter, also known as the Chief of Shadows; this seems to be his title in the organization. Not only was he the head of Shadowspire but he also seemed to be allied with the Symbolix Corporation (Damage #1).
- Kodrescu - a psychic illusionist.
- Mourn - the original Mourn was an armored and enhanced field operative for the terrorist organization known as Shadowspire.
- Mourn - when Shadowspire later re-formed in San Francisco, a second Mourn appeared as their front agent wearing similar armor.
- Steelhawk - an armored flying man that first appears in Damage #1.

== In other media ==
In the fourth season of Arrow, Shadowspire is an elite U.S Army Special Operation Force turned criminal, led by Baron Reiter and later by former U.S Army lieutenant Joyner.
