= Osira =

- Osira's debut appearance in Wonder Woman #231 (May 1977). Art by Bob Brown.

Publication information
- Publisher: DC Comics
- First appearance: Wonder Woman #231 (May 1977)
- Created by: Alan Brennert (co-writer), Martin Pasko (co-writer), Bob Brown (artist)

In-story information
- Abilities: Force fields Force blasts Mind manipulation

Osira is a fictional character in the DC Comics book Wonder Woman. She first appeared in Wonder Woman #231.

== Fictional character biography ==
=== Pre-Crisis history ===
Osira is an alien who crash-landed in ancient Egypt centuries ago alongside her husband Hefnakhti, with the two being worshiped as gods. However, the priest Anankh rebels against them and traps the two in a pyramid. In 1942, during World War II, Osira is freed after two tanks accidentally destroy the pyramid while fighting.

After learning that Hefnakhti died while attempting to escape the pyramid, Osira attempts to bring peace to the world once more, and comes into conflict with Wonder Woman. She kidnaps Steve Trevor, who resembles Hefnakhti, before Hefnakhti's spirit appears and appeases her.

=== "One Year Later" ===
In DC's "One Year Later" event, Osira appears for the first time in post-Crisis history. She battles Donna Troy, the current Wonder Woman, and Cassie Sandsmark, the current Wonder Girl.

== Powers and abilities ==
Osira is able to shoot powerful force blasts from her hands and create a force shield around her body. Her power needs recharging and can be depleted.

== See also ==
- List of Wonder Woman enemies
