= Kung (comics) =

- Kung as depicted in Who's Who: The Definitive Directory of the DC Universe #13 (March 1986). Art by Denys Cowan (penciler) and Dick Giordano (inker).

Publication information
- Publisher: DC Comics
- First appearance: Wonder Woman #237 (November 1977)
- Created by: Gerry Conway; José Delbo

In-story information
- Alter ego: Thomas Morita
- Notable aliases: Assassin of a Thousand Claws
- Abilities: Ability to transform into animals

Kung, Assassin of a Thousand Claws is a fictional character appearing in DC Comics publications and related media, commonly as a recurring foil of the superhero Wonder Woman. A Japanese-American mercenary with the magical ability to transform into animals, he first appeared in 1977's Wonder Woman #237, written by Gerry Conway and illustrated by José Delbo. He would reappear several years later in both All-Star Squadron and Who's Who in the DC Universe, as well as in Crisis on Infinite Earths, the 1985 company-wide publication event that rebooted DC Comics' continuity. After the Crisis on Infinite Earths, Wonder Woman and her supporting characters and foes were re-imagined. Though originally absent from this revised mythos, Kung was reintroduced for the Modern Age in 1998's Guns of the Dragon, a four-issue DC Comics limited series by Tim Truman. An updated version of the character, a shape-shifting martial arts master, would emerge to once again confront Wonder Woman in 2007's Wonder Woman (vol. 3) Annual #1, written by Allan Heinberg and illustrated by Terry Dodson and Rachel Dodson.

== Fictional character biography ==
=== Thomas Morita ===
Thomas Morita's parents immigrated to the United States from Japan before the Great Depression. During the Depression, his father was unable to find work and eventually died. His mother died soon afterward, leaving only Thomas and his sister, Nancy. Morita traveled to his parents' homeland to train as a samurai and learning of the internment of Japanese Americans only further fueled his hatred of America. At some point during his training, he underwent a mystical process that imbued him with the power to transform into animals.

Kung undertook his first assignment on December 30, 1941, to kill Prime Minister Winston Churchill on his way to Washington, D.C., but is stopped by the hero Steel.

On March 4, 1942, Kung is hired by the mysterious Prince Daka to team up with Tsunami and Sumo the Samurai, to infiltrate the All-Star Squadron's headquarters and steal Starman's gravity rod. This theft is thwarted by the Guardian and Kung escapes with Prince Daka.

In 1943, Kung is assigned to kill Douglas MacArthur in Washington, D.C. Wonder Woman foils the assassination attempt, but Kung escapes to his sister's home in New York's Chinatown. Kung tries again to assassinate MacArthur at the Brooklyn Navy Yard, but is apparently killed while saving his sister from a teetering battleship whose drydock supports had been washed away.

Sometime prior to his death, Kung is brought aboard the Monitor's satellite by Harbinger as part of a combined effort to save the remaining universes from the Anti-Monitor. He is later recruited by Brainiac as part of his massive supervillain army to conquer the multiverse.

In post-Crisis continuity, Kung made a deal with the U.S. Army in 1945 to convince Hirohito, Emperor of Japan, to surrender. However, the deadline for the surrender ran out and Kung was killed during the bombing of Hiroshima. His spirit returned to plague the modern day Justice Society of America.

=== Second Kung ===
A second unidentified Kung appears in Wonder Woman (vol. 3) Annual #1 (2007).

== Powers and abilities ==
Kung can transform himself into animal forms through concentration. His animal forms are larger than their normal counterparts and maintain his human mind. He is also a skilled samurai and martial artist.

== See also ==
- List of Wonder Woman enemies
