= Zatanna (Batman: The Animated Series) =

- Batman: The Animated Series episode
- "Zatanna" title card
- Episode no.: Season 1 Episode 54
- Directed by: Dan Riba; Dick Sebast
- Written by: Paul Dini
- Based on: Batman by Bob Kane (credited) and Bill Finger (uncredited)
- Original air date: February 2, 1993

Guest appearances
- Julie Brown as Zatanna; Vincent Schiavelli as Zatara; Michael York as Montague Kane; Bruce Timm as Red

Episode chronology
← Previous "Paging the Crime Doctor"	Next → "The Mechanic"

"Zatanna" is the 54th episode from Batman: The Animated Series. It first aired on February 2, 1993, and was written by Paul Dini and directed by Dan Riba and Dick Sebast. The episode features the first appearance of regular DC Comics character Zatanna in the DC Animated Universe.

== Plot ==
The episode opens with a flashback to Bruce Wayne's past, when he was training under the pseudonym John Smith with the magician Zatara, learning the skills of an escape artist in preparation for his future as Batman. He has a flirtatious relationship with Zatara's daughter, Zatanna, who he calls 'Zanna', though he appears to leave without acting upon their mutual attraction.

In the present day, Bruce Wayne is attending a performance by Zatanna, who has become a successful stage magician herself. Her performance involves having the money in the Gotham Mint vanish and reappear and is watched over by a debunker of magic named Montague Kane. After causing the money to vanish successfully, Zatanna finds herself unable to make it reappear, and is arrested for its theft. Refusing to believe that she could be guilty, Bruce begins to investigate as Batman.

Batman breaks Zatanna out of her police transport and the two travel to the scene of the crime. Along the way Zatanna questions why he would go to such lengths to prove her innocence. She asks if they have met before; Batman brushes off the question, answering her questions about having met by stating that he simply 'has one of those faces'. Upon exploring the stage on which she performed, Batman and Zatanna discover that the money was never there in the first place, and that somebody has enacted their own illusion to frame her. Suspecting Montague Kane, the two proceed to his estate. Kane is not present, though they do find evidence to implicate him, as well as signs that indicate that he is attempting to flee Gotham on his personal jet.

Racing to the airstrip, Batman and Zatanna board the plane and, after a pitched battle with Kane and his henchmen, are able to bring them to justice. When Batman calls Zatanna 'Zanna', she realizes that he was Zatara's apprentice years ago. The two part as friends, with the implication that they could someday be something more.

== Voice cast ==
- Kevin Conroy as Bruce Wayne / Batman
- Efrem Zimbalist Jr. as Alfred Pennyworth
- Julie Brown as Zatanna
- Vincent Schiavelli as Zatara
- Michael York as Montague Kane
- Bruce Timm as Red

== Production ==
According to Batman: The Animated Series writer/story editor Paul Dini, Zatanna's traditional fishnet stockings from the comics were left out of her DC Animated Universe (DCAU) version's costume due to being difficult to animate.

== Reception ==
"Zatanna" is generally well regarded. Oliver Sava of The A.V. Club gave the episode a positive review and a 'B' grade. GamesRadar+'s Kat Calamia ranked the episode as fourth best Batman: The Animated Series episodes of all time.
