= Baron Blitzkrieg =

- Baron Blitzkrieg as seen in Young All-Stars #9.

Publication information
- Publisher: DC Comics
- First appearance: World's Finest Comics #246 (September 1977)
- Created by: Gerry Conway; Don Heck

In-story information
- Alter ego: Baron Reiter
- Team affiliations: Axis Amerika; Shadowspire; Secret Society of Super Villains; Black Lantern Corps
- Abilities: Superhuman strength Heat vision Flight

Baron Blitzkrieg is a supervillain appearing in American comic books published by DC Comics.

== Publication history ==
The character (also known as Baron Reiter and simply the Baron) was created by Gerry Conway and Don Heck, and first appeared in World's Finest Comics #246 (September 1977).

== Fictional character biography ==
Baron Reiter was originally a German army officer during World War II who was blinded and disfigured when a concentration camp prisoner threw a bottle in his face. German scientists experimented on Reiter, which restored his sight, but not his appearance. Nonetheless, he is given superhuman strength, invulnerability, optical energy beams, and the ability to fly. While he can initially manifest each of these abilities one at a time, he underwent training to incorporate these abilities together.

Baron Blitzkrieg's first several appearances were antagonistic encounters with Wonder Woman and Superman. Blitzkrieg went on to be a frequent opponent of the All-Star Squadron.

Baron Blitzkrieg is the leader of Shadowspire, conspiring with Vandal Savage's Symbolix organization in experimental research that led to Damage gaining superpowers.

During the "Infinite Crisis" storyline, Baron Blitzkrieg joins the Secret Society of Super Villains. He is killed by Superboy-Prime during the Battle of Metropolis. Baron Blitzkrieg returns in the "Blackest Night" storyline, where he is temporarily resurrected as a Black Lantern.

Baron Blitzkrieg appears in a flashback in JSA (vol. 2). During the 1940s, he led Gudra the Valkyrie, Horned Owl, Zyklon, and Nazi soldiers in a bid to steal the Spear of Destiny, only to be thwarted by the Justice Society of America and the Blackhawks.

== Powers and abilities ==
Baron Blitzkrieg possesses enhanced strength, durability, and agility, as well as heat vision and flight. He sports body armor that further enhances his durability.

== Other versions ==
An alternate universe version of Baron Blitzkrieg makes a minor appearance in Flashpoint, where he is killed by Frankenstein.

== In other media ==
- Baron Reiter appears in flashbacks depicted in the fourth season of Arrow, portrayed by Jimmy Akingbola. This version is African and grew up in a small village which was destroyed by bandits. Though Reiter survived, the event traumatized him and he vowed to never feel powerless again. After becoming a mercenary and founding Shadowspire, Reiter leads the group them in occupying Lian Yu to find a magical artifact called the Khushu Idol. Reiter finds the idol and sacrifices two of his men to gain power from it, acquiring superhuman strength and telekinesis. He battles Oliver Queen, who had been sent to stop him, and is killed in battle.
- Blitzkrieg appears in Freedom Fighters: The Ray, voiced by Scott Whyte. This version is a speedster from Earth-X and a member of the New Reichsmen.

== See also ==
- List of Wonder Woman enemies
