= Zelos =

Zelos may refer to:

- An alternate spelling of Zelus, a lesser god in ancient Greek mythology
- Zelos Wilder, a character in the Nintendo GameCube game Tales of Symphonia
- Zelos, the main antagonist in the video game Salamander
- Frog Zelos, a character in Saint Seiya
- Zelos (single album), a 2016 album by South Korean boy band VIXX

== See also ==
- Zelo, stage name of South Korean rapper and dancer Choi Jun-hong (born 1996)
- Zelis, German name for Želiezovce, a town in Slovakia
