= List of DC Comics characters: Z =

== Zatara ==
Zatara is the name of two characters in DC Comics.

=== Giovanni Zatara ===
- First appearance: Action Comics #1 (June 1938)
- Created by: Fred Guardineer
- Teams: All-Star Squadron; Justice Society Dark; Cult of the Cold Flame
- Abilities: Mastery of magic; primarily able to invoke supernatural effects by speaking the desired effects backwards and possess extensive knowledge of the supernatural. Access to various mystical artifacts; Master stage magician and escape artist
- Aliases: Master Magician

Giovanni "John" Zatara, simply called Zatara, is a fictional magician and superhero appearing in American comic books published by DC Comics. The character first appeared in Action Comics #1 in 1938 during the Golden Age of Comic Books, making him one of DC Comics' oldest characters.

The son of Italian immigrants and a descendant of Leonardo da Vinci, Zatara becomes a successful stage magician and superhero. Originally depicted as human, Zatara is later depicted as a homo magi whose teaching from Phantom Stranger helped control his magical abilities at a young age. In his adulthood, Zatara garners a reputation among his contemporaries, rivaling Doctor Fate. He is the father of Zatanna and uncle of Zachary Zatara.

In the Swamp Thing storyline "American Gothic", John Constantine assembles Zatanna, Mento, and Sargon the Sorcerer to battle the entity known as the 'Great Evil Beast'. The four hold a séance at Wintersgate Manor, the home of Baron Winters, to summon the Beast. The Beast kills Sargon and attempts to kill Zatanna as well. However, Zatara absorbs the Beast's attack, sacrificing himself to save his daughter's life.

A master magician, Zatara invokes magical effects and casts spells by speaking a spell or phrase backwards for a desired effect (known as "Logomancy"). Additionally, Zatara is a capable stage magician, skilled in prestidigitation, and a skilled escape artist.

==== Zatara in other media ====
- Giovanni Zatara appears in a flashback in the Batman: The Animated Series episode "Zatanna", voiced by Vincent Schiavelli.
- Giovanni Zatara appears in Young Justice, voiced by Nolan North. This version is a member of the Justice League and was originally trained by Kent Nelson. After Nelson dies, Zatara is forced to don the Helmet of Fate and become Doctor Fate, Nabu's host, to prevent Zatanna from doing so. Due to the strain of hosting Nabu's power, Zatara ages rapidly over the course of several years. In the fourth season, Zatanna frees Zatara by arranging for Nabu to rotate between a series of hosts.
- Giovanni Zatara appears in DC Super Hero Girls, voiced by Phil LaMarr.
- Giovanni Zatara makes a cameo appearance in Superman via a mural.
- Giovanni Zatara appears as a character summon in Scribblenauts Unmasked: A DC Comics Adventure.
- Giovanni Zatara appears in the "Zatanna" entry of the Cartoon Monsoon contest, voiced by Steve Blum.
- Giovanni Zatara appears in a crossover between The Batman Adventures and Superman Adventures. This version previously taught a young Bruce Wayne and Clark Kent.
- Giovanni Zatara appears in Smallville Season 11 as a member of Shadowpact during World War II.

=== Zach Zatara ===
Zachary "Zach" Zatara, also known mononymously as Zatara, is a superhero featured in American comic books published by DC Comics. He made his first appearance in Teen Titans (vol. 3) #34 and was created by Geoff Johns and Tony Daniel. The character is the cousin of Zatanna and the nephew of the original Zatara. In the aftermath of the events of Day of Vengeance, Zachary gained magical powers and chose to follow in his family's footsteps, becoming a superhero and stage magician with real magical powers.

==== Powers and abilities of Zachary Zatara ====
Similar to other members of his family, Zachary is able to manipulate magic by articulating spells in reverse. Zachary's magical powers have a limitation - he is unable to directly affect living beings (with the exception of doves).

== Zeiss ==
Philo Zeiss is a mercenary, contract killer and bodyguard, surgically enhanced to augment his speed and reflexes, and equipped with vision-enhancing goggles and extensive martial arts training. He is brought to Gotham City by the Sicilian Mafia, where he battles Batman to a standstill and nearly kills Catwoman.

== Zodiac Master ==
Zodiac Master is a villain who made his presence known in Gotham by predicting a succession of disasters, all of which he has secretly orchestrated. Having cemented his reputation, he starts offering odds on the relative success or failure for the plans of various criminals, all in exchange for 25% of the take.

=== Zodiac Master in other media ===
- Zodiac Master makes a non-speaking appearance in the Batman: The Brave and the Bold episode "A Bat Divided!".
- Zodiac Master appears in The Lego Batman Movie.

== Ashley Zolomon ==
- First appearance: The Flash (vol. 2) #197 (June 2003)
- Created by: Geoff Johns and Scott Kolins

Dr. Ashley Zolomon is a character appearing in DC Comics. The character made her first appearance in The Flash (vol. 2) #197 (June 2003), and was created by Geoff Johns and Scott Kolins. She is a profiler in Keystone City's police department who is a colleague of Wally West and the estranged wife of Hunter Zolomon.

Ashley worked with the F.B.I. when she met Hunter and they married with the two specialized in apprehending low-level costumed criminals until Hunter inadvertently caused her father's death by mistakenly believing that the Clown was incapable of using a gun, causing their estrangement.

=== Ashley Zolomon in other media ===
An alternate universe version of Ashley Zolomon appears in The Flash episode "Versus Zoom", portrayed by Tatyana Forrest. This version is the mother of Hunter Zolomon and the wife of James Zolomon, who murdered her.

== Zombie ==
Zombie is a character appearing in American comic books published by DC Comics. He debuted in Batman: Vengeance of Bane #1 and was created by Chuck Dixon and Graham Nolan.

Zombie assisted in the medical facilities of Santa Prisca, where he witnessed the uprising of Bane. He, Bane, Bird, and Trogg escaped one day and went to Gotham City to begin Bane's master plan at the start of the "Batman: Knightfall" storyline. Like Trogg, Zombie also maintained the maintenance of Bane's Venom drug pump. In post-Rebirth continuity, Zombie is mute and able to absorb the life force of others.

=== Zombie in other media ===
Zombie appears in the Kite Man: Hell Yeah! episode "Prison Break, Hell Yeah!".

== Zook ==
Zook is a character appearing in comic books published by National Periodical Publications (now known as DC Comics), primarily appearing in the 1960s. He was the partner of the superhero J'onn J'onzz, the Manhunter from Mars (now known as Martian Manhunter). Zook's first published appearance was in the story, "The Invaders from the Space Warp" from Detective Comics #311 (January 1963). Like Martian Manhunter, Zook is an alien who was stranded on Earth. Originally from another dimension, Zook traveled to Earth and was left unable to return to his dimension after the portal was closed.

Zook can alter the temperature of his body to be incredibly hot (enough to instantly melt a car into slag) or incredibly cold (enough to instantly freeze a river). Zook's antennae allow him to track anyone he has previously met and see through disguises. Zook also possesses limited shapeshifting abilities, allowing him to stretch and flatten his body.

=== Zook in other media ===
Zook appears in All-New Batman: The Brave and the Bold #5.

== Agatha Zorbatos ==
Agatha Zorbatos is a character appearing in American comic books published by DC Comics. She first appeared in Batman Vol. 2 #23.4 during the "Forever Evil" storyline and was created by Peter Tomasi and Graham Nolan.

Agatha Zorbatos is the interim prison warden of Blackgate Penitentiary.

== Zuggernaut ==
- First appearance: Firestorm the Nuclear Man #69 (March 1988)
- Created by: John Ostrander and Joe Brozowski
- Abilities: Superhuman strength, near invulnerability, energy discharge, long, sharp claws and fangs
- Aliases: Matvei Rodor
- Further reading: Zuggernaut at the Comic Book DB (archived from the original); Zuggernaut at the Grand Comics Database

The Zuggernaut is an alien who crashed on Earth as a meteorite in Russia. It was found by, and bonded to, Matvei Rodor, a black marketeer. Rodor is in conflict with a corrupt Moscow prosecutor named Soliony and agrees to Zuggernaut's offer of help in exchange for being its host.

Returning to Moscow, they attack Soliony, who has been interrogating Mikhail Arkadin. Arkadin summons Firestorm and escapes the jail to find Zuggernaut threatening Soliony. Zuggernaut is driven off when Firestorm burns their chest.

Zuggernaut reappears a short time later and allows itself to be captured to get to Soliony. Again Firestorm intervenes, creating discord for both the alien and its host. Their fight with Firestorm is interrupted by Stalnoivolk, allowing Rodor to override Zuggernaut's desire to fight Firestorm and chase after Soliony. They, in turn, are delayed by the Russian super-team Soyuz, allowing Firestorm to catch up and stop them. This results in Rodor being killed and Zuggernaut withdrawing to find a new host.

== Zyklon ==
Der Zyklon is a fictional DC Comics character. Created by Roy Thomas, the character first appeared in All-Star Squadron #45 (May 1985).

The word zyklon is German for cyclone. Zyklon was given the power to move at superhuman speeds by scientists of the Third Reich, and assisted Baron Blitzkrieg, in stealing the Liberty Bell. Their plans were thwarted by Johnny Quick, Liberty Belle, Hawkgirl, and the Flash, members of the All-Star Squadron.
