= Dolus =

Mythological character

In Classical mythology, Dolus (Latin: Dolus, lit. 'Deception, Guile, Deceit') is a figure who appears in an Aesopic fable by the Roman fabulist Gaius Julius Phaedrus, where he is an apprentice of the Titan Prometheus. According to the Roman mythographer Hyginus, Dolus was the offspring of Aether and Terra (Earth), while Cicero has Dolus being the offspring of Erebus and Nox (Night).

== Prometheus and Guile ==
Dolus appears as a character in one of the Aesopic fables (number 535 in the Perry Index), by the Roman poet and fabulist Gaius Julius Phaedrus, titled Prometheus and Guile (Prometheus et Dolus), subtitled On Truth and Falsehood (De veritate et mendacio). In Phaedrus's fable, Prometheus appears as a sculptor in clay who can bring to life the figures he creates. Having just made a sculpture of Truth (Veritas/Aletheia), he is called away by Jove, leaving his workshop in the hands of his apprentice Dolus. Out of sense of rivalry, Dolus fashions an exact duplicate of Prometheus's Truth, except for the fact that, because he has run out of clay, Dolus' figure has no feet. When Prometheus returns he marvels at Dolus's work, and wishing to take credit for the amazing skill required to make so exact a duplicate, he fires both clay figures in his kiln. When both figures come to life, Prometheus' Truth walks gracefully forward, while Dolus's figure stands fixed unable to walk. Ever after Dolus's figure was called Falsehood (Mendacium/Pseudologos). In closing the fabulist says that when people say that Falsehood has no feet, he agrees, adding the moral (similar to the idiom "the truth will out"):

Now and then counterfeits bring men profit at the start, but in the long run the truth itself comes to light.
