= Infinite Frontier =

2021 DC Comics storyline & universe relaunch event

- Title logo for Infinite Frontier #0

Publication information
- Publisher: DC Comics
- Genre: Superhero
- Publication date: March 2, 2021 – January 24, 2023
- Main character: DC Universe

Creative team
- Written by: Various
- Artist: Various

Infinite Frontier is a 2021 relaunch by the American comic book publisher DC Comics of its entire line of ongoing monthly superhero comic book titles. It is the follow-up to the 2018 New Justice relaunch. The relaunch and event was shepherded by writer Joshua Williamson. The continuity and repercussions established by Infinite Frontier continue into the 2023 Dawn of DC relaunch.

== Changes in the DC Universe ==
Infinite Frontier begins after the events of Dark Nights: Death Metal, Generations and Future State.

The DC Multiverse has expanded into a larger "Omniverse" where everything is canon and it will still deal with the repercussions of DC Rebirth.

The new Multiverse has two opposite worlds that represent the Metaverse and sustain the balance: one is the Elseworld, and the other is Earth Omega, where Darkseid is imprisoned.

In the new status quo, all of DC history "counts" when understanding a character's backstory, and legacy and history within the franchise is being emphasised by editorial mandate, with many characters now sharing the same codenames. For example, Stephanie Brown and Cassandra Cain share the Batgirl title, while Oracle (Barbara Gordon) reserves the right to also wear the Batgirl costume from time to time. Jonathan Kent and his father Clark Kent are both Superman, while Conner Kent is once again Superboy. Wally West has stepped up as the primary Flash while Barry Allen and the Flash of China, Avery Ho, participate in Justice League Incarnate. While Diana of Themiscyra continues in her role as Wonder Woman from the afterlife, her mother, Hippolyta, serves in Wonder Woman's place on the Justice League, and her sister, Nubia, explores the idea of succeeding Diana as Wonder Woman. The new Batman Jace Fox succeeds Bruce Wayne for a short time, before later serving as the Batman of New York City while Bruce remains in Gotham City. Another example of a relaxed approach to codename sharing among legacy characters is Robin: Tim Drake is officially Robin once again, but the previous Robin (Damian Wayne) continues to head up the Robin comic book without an official codename, while newcomer Maps Mizoguchi assumes the role briefly in a short story.

The soft relaunch and new approach to history also completes what began with DC Rebirth in restoring the status quo of characters prior to popular New 52 changes, re-establishing characters' memories and relationships with each other, while selectively retaining some of the simplified backstories from the modern era and many of the new characters. An example of this is Tim Drake once again serving as Robin. Some characters have simply returned to being as fans remembered them; for example, the Black Canary, who in The New 52 had been presented as a singular new version of the character, has been restored to being the daughter of her Golden Age predecessor. Other changes were made to address longstanding inconsistencies. After many decades of back-and-forth changes to her backstory involving false memories, magical cloning, and multiversal anomalies, Donna Troy's original backstory – an orphan girl raised by the Amazons – was restored to continuity.

== Plot ==
After the recreation of the infinite Multiverse, and a look into a possible future of her universe, Wonder Woman, who has ascended after the defeat of The Batman Who Laughs, is offered a role by the Quintessence (Ganthet, Hera, Highfather, the Phantom Stranger, the Spectre, and the wizard Shazam) in return for saving the Multiverse. The Spectre takes her to a journey where it is revealed that Roy Harper is resurrected as well as Batman dealing with a mysterious group of enemies. Wonder Woman rejects becoming a part of the Quintessence since she wants to live it rather than just witness it. As she leaves, the Quintessence go to Earth Omega, where they are attacked by Darkseid, who has finally achieved his true form after his past versions were combined into one.

On Earth, everyone is now aware of the Multiverse (as a result of events in Dark Nights: Death Metal), and Alan Scott (who came out to his children) is struggling with living in this new world. He talks with his son Obsidian when the Justice Society of America's headquarters explodes in green flames, and Alan asks where Jade is. In Paris, as Director Bones is talking to Cameron Chase about the recent events that have transpired, Batman (from the Flashpoint era) crashes on Earth 23, where he meets the Justice Incarnate (Calvin Ellis, Mary Marvel from Earth 5, Machinehead from Earth 8, Aquawoman from Earth 11, and Captain Carrot from Earth 26) and asks where Barry Allen is. While running through the multiverse, Barry Allen vibrates through the worlds and arrives in Earth Omega, where he is attacked by the Psycho-Pirate, who wants Barry to find someone. In a diner, Roy Harper deals with an angry customer when an enemy named X-Tract attacks him. Roy wards off the attacker, realizing that he has a Black Lantern ring.

Cameron Chase contacts Batman and Superman about the public being worried about the Multiverse, but Superman and Batman dodge her questions. Thomas Wayne admits that seeing his whole world turned him evil and he does not want his son to know he is alive. Magog of Earth 22 attacks Calvin Ellis and Thomas Wayne, having gone back to his villainous roots. Back on Earth-0, Mr. Terrific tells Vandal Savage, Obsidian, and Alan Scott that there are still people who do not have their memories restored or are missing after the restoration of the Multiverse. Roy Harper starts training with his Black Lantern Ring, but gets overwhelmed by its power. Meanwhile, Cameron Chase confronts Captain Atom but after realizing this Captain Atom is an impostor, the impostor blows himself up.

The Psycho-Pirate puts the Flash on a treadmill in Earth Omega and uses his power to take Barry somewhere else. Obsidian and Alan Scott meet a man named Shade and they realize that an enemy of Obsidian has stolen Jade. The duo goes to Command D, where they are attacked by Director Bones, X-Tract, and Cameron Chase. The Justice Incarnate calm down Magog and, after Magog allows them to touch a mysterious spacecraft, Calvin Ellis tells everyone they need to go back to his Earth. Roy Harper regains control of his Black Lantern ring, but is captured by Hector Hammond when he is saved by the Infinite Incorporated (Power Girl and Jade).

Thomas Wayne and Calvin Ellis go to his office to find Lex Luthor of Earth 23 to get a transmatter symphonic array to travel through universes. They find Lex Luthor of Earth 23 dead, while Cameron Chase is saved by X-Tract from the fake Captain Atom and meets with Detective Bones, who then shoots him in the leg when he finds out that he plans to leave other universes to die. The Infinite Incorporated arrived on Earth Omega, but they are soon attacked. Likewise, Thomas Wayne and Calvin Ellis plan to go to Earth Omega when Machinehead attacks them. Machinehead reveals his world was destroyed when Earth-0 invaded his home and plans to keep the universes separate before calling in the Injustice Incorporated.

On Earth Omega, the Psycho-Pirate explains his world was the original Earth-Two before "Crisis on Infinite Earths", and his world was replaced by a new version. Detective Bones was revealed to have shot down Cameron Chase's ship and says that he made a deal with Darkseid to spare their Earth in exchange for others. Jade knocks down Detective Bones, and X-Tract reveals she was Cameron Chase from the original Earth-Two, and the Psycho-Pirate explains that the Flash is running so Darkseid can cross-dimension to gain enough power to control the Multiverse. Machinehead attacks Calvin Ellis, explaining that when the Flash created Flashpoint, it caused changes to his Earth which made it darker and restrains Calvin Ellis. The Psycho-Pirate nearly persuades Roy Harper to join his side, but slips out that Roy's daughter is still alive. Roy Harper frees everyone, but his overuse of the Black Lantern Ring causes Darkseid to appear.

Obsidian frees Roy Harper from Darkseid, while Thomas Wayne and Calvin Ellis defeat Machinehead. Calvin Ellis destroys the treadmill the Flash was on, which causes the Flash to disappear. Darkseid kills Machinehead and teleports everyone back home while the Psycho-Pirate flees in terror of his failure. X-Tract acquires Roy's Black Lantern ring and meets up with Darkseid, Granny Goodness, DeSaad, Grail (Darkseid's daughter), Steppenwolf and Kalibak, where Darkseid reveals to his elites that Earth-0 is not on Earth but in a place where the Great Darkness rests, which he vows to find the Flash and crack the Omniverse to take control of the Great Darkness, believing that there are other dark forces who were seeking to control it. X-Tract swears her allegiance to him. Director Bones was mentioned to have escaped. The Flash arrives in the Multiverse-2, the ruins of the first Crisis, where he meets Pariah, who transports the Flash to a different Earth for sinister reasons.

== Titles ==
Key

Color	Meaning
	Title continued into Dawn of DC.

=== Ongoing series ===
Title	Issues	Initial creative teams (excluding back-ups) (Note: For additional creative team information, see each title's individual article.)			Debut Date	Conclusion Date
Title	Issues	Writer(s)	Artist(s)	Colorist(s)	Debut Date	Conclusion Date
Action Comics	#1029–1050	Phillip Kennedy Johnson; Simon Spurrier	Phil Hester	Hi-Fi	March 2021	TBA
Batgirls	#1–19	Becky Cloonan; Michael W. Conrad	Jorge Corona	Sarah Stern; Ivan Plascencia	December 2021	June 2023
Batman (vol. 3)	#106–134	James Tynion IV	Jorge Jimenez	Tomeu Morey; Romulo Fajardo Jr.	March 2021	April 2023
Batman: Urban Legends	#1–23	Various	Various	Various	March 2021	January 2023
Batman/Superman (vol. 2)	#16–22	Gene Luen Yang	Ivan Reis	Sabine Rich; Hi-Fi	March 2022	September 2022
Batman/Superman: World's Finest	#1–11	Mark Waid	Dan Mora	Tamra Bonvillain	March 2022	TBA
Catwoman (vol. 5)	#29–51	Ram V	Fernando Blanco	Jordie Bellaire	March 2021	TBA
Deathstroke Inc.	#1–15	Joshua Williamson	Howard Porter	Hi-Fi; Romulo Fajardo Jr.	September 2021	November 2022
Detective Comics	#1034–1061	Mariko Tamaki	Dan Mora	Jordie Bellaire	March 2021	TBA
The Flash	#768–800	Jeremy Adams	Brandon Peterson	Luis Guerrero	March 2021	June 2023
Future State: Gotham	#1–18	Joshua Williamson	Giannis Milonogiannis	N/A	May 2021	October 2022
Green Lantern (vol. 6)	#1–12	Geoffrey Thorne	Dexter Soy	Alex Sinclair	April 2021	April 2022
Harley Quinn (vol. 4)	#1–22	Stephanie Phillips	Riley Rossmo	Ivan Plascencia	March 2021	TBA
I Am Batman	#1–18	John Ridley	Olivier Coipel	Alex Sinclair	September 2021	February 2023
The Joker (vol. 2)	#1–15	James Tynion IV; Matthew Rosenberg	Guillem March	Arif Prianto	March 2021	July 2022
Justice League (vol. 4)	#59–75	Brian Michael Bendis	David Marquez	Tamra Bonvillain	March 2021	April 2022
Nightwing (vol. 4)	#78–100	Tom Taylor	Bruno Redondo	Adriano Lucas	March 2021	TBA
Robin (vol. 3)	#1–17	Joshua Williamson	Gleb Melnikov	Gleb Melnikov	April 2021	August 2022
Suicide Squad (vol. 7)	#1–15	Robbie Thompson	Eduardo Pansica	Marcelo Maiolo	March 2021	May 2022
Superman (vol. 5)	#29–32	Phillip Kennedy Johnson	Phil Hester	Hi-Fi	March 2021	June 2021
Superman: Son of Kal-El	#1–15	Tom Taylor	John Timms	Gabe Eltaeb	July 2021	December 2022
Teen Titans Academy	#1–15	Tim Sheridan	Rafa Sandoval	Jordi Tarragona; Alejandro Sánchez	March 2021	May 2022
Wonder Girl (vol. 3)	#1–7	Joëlle Jones	Joëlle Jones	Jordie Bellaire	May 2021	January 2022
Wonder Woman	#770–800	Becky Cloonan; Michael W. Conrad	Travis Moore	Tamra Bonvillain	March 2021	June 2023

=== Limited series ===
Title	Issues	Publication date	Creative team			Notes
Title	Issues	Publication date	Writer(s)	Artist(s)	Colorist(s)	Notes
Aquaman/Green Arrow: Deep Target	#1–7	October 2021–April 2022	Brandon Thomas	Ronan Cliquet	Ulises Arreola	
Aquaman: The Becoming	#1–6	September 2021 – February 2022	Brandon Thomas	Diego Olortegui	Adriano Lucas; Alex Guimarães	
Aquaman & The Flash: Voidsong	#1–3	June–August 2022	Jackson Lanzing; Collin Kelly	Vasco Georgiev		
Aquamen	#1–6	February-July 2022	Chuck Brown; Brandon Thomas	Sami Basri	Adriano Lucas	
Arkham City: The Order of the World	#1–6	October 2021 – March 2022	Dan Watters	Dani	Dave Stewart	
Batman Beyond: Neo Year	#1–6	April 2022 - September 2022	Jackson Lanzing; Collin Kelly	Max Dunbar	Sebastian Cheng	
Batman: Fortress	#1–8	May 2022–	Gary Whitta	Darick Robertson		
Batman: Killing Time	#1–6	March–August 2022	Tom King	David Marquez	Alejandro Sánchez	
Batman: The Detective	#1–6	April–November 2021	Tom Taylor	Andy Kubert	Brad Anderson	
Batman: The Knight	#1–10	January–October 2022	Chip Zdarsky	Carmine Di Giandomenico	Ivan Plascencia	
Blue & Gold	#1–8	July 2021 – April 2022	Dan Jurgens	Ryan Sook	Ryan Sook	
Black Adam	#1–12	June 2022–	Christopher Priest	Rafa Sandoval	Matt Herms	
Black Manta	#1–6	September 2021 – February 2022–	Chuck Brown	Valentine De Landro; Matthew Smith	Marissa Louise	
Checkmate	#1–6	June–November 2021	Brian Michael Bendis	Alex Maleev	Dave Stewart	Originally titled Event Leviathan: Checkmate
Crime Syndicate	#1–6	March–August 2021	Andy Schmidt	Kieran McKeown	Kieran McKeown; Bryan Hitch	Steve Oliff; Alex Sinclair
Crush & Lobo	#1–8	June 2021 – January 2022	Mariko Tamaki	Amancay Nahuelpan	Tamra Bonvillain	
Dark Crisis	#1–7	June 2022–	Joshua Williamson	Daniel Sampere	Alejandro Sánchez	Preceded by Dark Crisis #0 FCBD Special Edition and Justice League: Road to Dark Crisis #1.
Dark Knights of Steel	#1–12	November 2021–	Tom Taylor	Yasmine Putri; Bengal	Yasmine Putri; Arif Prianto	
DC vs. Vampires	#1–12	November 2021–	James Tynion IV; Matthew Rosenberg	Otto Schmidt; Simone di Meo		
DC Mech	#1–6	July 2022–	Kenny Porter	Baldemar Rivas	Mike Spicer	
Earth-Prime	#1–6	April–June 2022	Camrus Johnson; Natalie Abrams; Kelly Larson; Adam Mallinger; Jai Jamison; Andrew Wong; Lauren Fields; Daniel Park; James Robinson; Paula Sevenbergen	Clayton Henry; Tom Grummett; Norm Rapmund; Paul Pelletier; Andrew Hennessy; Jerry Ordway		
The Flash: The Fastest Man Alive	#1–3	September 2022 – November 2022	Kenny Porter	Ricardo López Ortiz; Juan Ferreyra		
Flashpoint Beyond	#0–6	April–October 2022	Geoff Johns; Jeremy Adams; Tim Sheridan	Xermanico; Mikel Janin		Preceded by Flashpoint Beyond #0.
Infinite Frontier	#1–6	June–September 2021	Joshua Williamson	Xermanico; Paul Pelletier; Norm Rapmund; Jesús Merino; Tom Derenick; Raúl Fernández	Romulo Fajardo Jr.	
Jurassic League	#1–6	May–October 2022	Daniel Warren Johnson; Juan Gedeon	Juan Gedeon	Mike Spicer	
Justice League Incarnate	#1–5	November 2021 – March 2022	Joshua Williamson; Dennis Culver	Andrei Bressan; Brandon Peterson; Paul Pelletier; Norm Rapmund; Kyle Hotz; Mikel Janín; Todd Nauck; Ariel Olivetti; Nicole Virella; Mike Norton; Chris Burnham; Jesús Merino	Hi-Fi	
Justice League: Last Ride	#1–7	May–November 2021	Chip Zdarsky	Miguel Mendonça	Enrica Angiolini	
Justice League: vs. the Legion of Super-Heroes	#1–6	January 2022 – September 2022	Brian Michael Bendis	Scott Godlewski	Ryan Cody	
Legends of the Dark Knight	#1–8	Various	Various		May 2021–	
The Joker Presents: A Puzzlebox	#1–7	August 2021 – February 2022	Matthew Rosenberg	Jesús Merino; Joshua Hixson; Dominike Stanton; Juni Ba; Vanessa del Rey; Ricardo López Ortiz; Freddie Williams II; Chris Mooneyham; Shawn Crystal; Juan Doe; Vicente Cifuentes; Mike Norton	Ulises Arreola; Juan Doe	
The Next Batman: Second Son	#1–4	April–July 2021	John Ridley	Tony Akins; Travel Foreman; Mark Morales	Rex Lokus	Digital first from February 23, 2021
Man-Bat (vol. 4)	#1–5	February–June 2021	Dave Weilgosz	Sumit Kumar	Romulo Fajardo Jr.	
Mister Miracle: The Source of Freedom	#1–6	May–November 2021	Brandon Easton	Fico Ossio	Rico Renzi	
Monkey Prince	#1–12	February 2022 -	Gene Luen Yang	Bernard Chang	Sebastian Cheng	
Naomi: Season Two	#1–6	March–August 2022	Brian Michael Bendis; David F. Walker	Jamal Campbell	Jamal Campbell	
Nubia and the Amazons	#1–6	October 2021 – March 2022	Stephanie Williams; Vita Ayala	Alitha Martinez	Mark Morales	
One-Star Squadron	#1–6	December 2021–May 2022	Mark Russell	Steve Lieber	Dave Stewart	
Robin & Batman	#1–3	November 2021 – January 2022	Jeff Lemire	Dustin Nguyen		
Robins	#1–6	November 2021 – April 2022	Tim Seeley	Baldemar Rivas	Romulo Fajardo Jr.	Digital first from October 2021
Sensational Wonder Woman	#1–14	March–April 2021	Stephanie Phillips; Andrea Shea; Colleen Doran; Alyssa Wong; Corinna Sara Bechko; Amy Chu; Sina Grace; Sanya Anwar	Meghan Hetrick; Bruno Redondo; Colleen Doran; Eleonora Carlini; Dani Strips; M. L. Sanapo; Paul Pelletier; Sanya Anwar	Marissa Louise; Bruno Redondo; Colleen Doran; Eleonora Carlini; Mike Spicer; Wendy Broome; Adriano Lucas; Eva de la Cruz	Digital first from January 6, 2021
Shazam!	#1–4	July–October 2021	Tim Sheridan	Clayton Henry	Marcelo Maiolo	
Suicide Squad: King Shark	#1–6	September 2021 – January 2022	Tim Seeley	Scott Kolins	John Kalisz	Digital first from August 2021
Supergirl: Woman of Tomorrow	#1–8	June 2021 – February 2022	Tom King	Bilquis Evely	Mat Lopes	
Superman '78	#1–6	August 2021 – January 2022	Robert Venditti	Wilfredo Torres	Jordie Bellaire	
Superman and the Authority	#1–4	July–October 2021	Grant Morrison	Mikel Janín	Jordie Bellaire	
Superman: Red & Blue	#1–6	March–August 2021	John Ridley; Brandon Easton; Wes Craig; Dan Watters; Marguerite Bennett	Clayton Henry; Steve Lieber; Wes Craig; Dani; Jill Thompson	Jordie Bellaire; Ron Chan; Wes Craig; Dani; Jill Thompson	
The Swamp Thing	#1–16	March 2021–August 2022	Ram V	Mike Perkins	Mike Spicer	
Task Force Z	#1–12	October 2021–September 2022	Matthew Rosenberg	Eddy Barrows; Eber Ferreira; Kieran McKeown; Dexter Vines; Jackson Hebert; Matt Santorelli	Adriano Lucas	
Titans United	#1–7	September 2021 – March 2022	Cavan Scott	Jose Luis	Rex Lokus	
Trial of the Amazons	#1–2	March–April 2022	Becky Cloonan; Michael W. Conrad; Stephanie Williams; Vita Ayala; Joëlle Jones	Jöelle Jones; Elena Casagrande; Laura Braga; Skylar Patridge		
Trial of the Amazons: Wonder Girl	#1–2	March–April 2022	Joëlle Jones			
War for Earth-3	#1–2	March 2022	Dennis Hopeless; Robbie Thompson	Steve Pugh; Dexter Soy; Brent Peeples	Matt Herms	
Wonder Woman: Black & Gold	#1–6	June–November 2021	A.J. Mendez; Nadia Shammas; John Arcudi; Amy Reeder; Becky Cloonan; Mariko Tamaki; Che Grayson; Stephanie Williams; Tillie Walden; Rachel Smythe; Peter J. Tomasi; Janet Harvey; Andrew MacLean; Paula Sevenbergen; Aimee Garcia; Sina Grace; Andrew Constant; Nnedi Okorafor; Paul Azaceta; Kurt Busiek; Sherri L. Smith; Josie Campbell; Sanya Anwar; Trung Le Nguyen; Christos Gage; Michael W. Conrad; Sheena Howard	Ming Doyle; Morgan Beem; Ryan Sook; Amy Reeder; Becky Cloonan; Tillie Walden; Rachel Smythe; Jamie McKelvie; Corin Howell; Ashley A. Woods; Christian Alamy; Steve Epting; Inaki Miranda; Megan Levens; Sébastian Fiumara; Paul Azaceta; Nicola Scott; Leonardo Romero; Jack T. Cole; Trung Le Nguyen; Carlos D'Anda; Colleen Doran; Benjamin Dewey; Liam Sharp; Marguerite Sauvage; Kevin Maguire; Jamal Campbell; Noah Bailey; Jordie Bellaire; Eva de La Cruz; John Kalisz; Adriano Lucas		
Wonder Woman: Evolution	#1–8	November 2021 – July 2022	Stephanie Phillips	Mike Hawthorne; Adriano Di Benedetto	Jordie Bellaire	
World of Krypton	#1–6	December 2021–May 2022	Robert Venditti	Michael Avon Oeming	Nick Filardi	

=== One-shots ===
Title	Issues	Publication date	Creative team			Notes
Title	Issues	Publication date	Writer(s)	Artist(s)	Colorist(s)	Notes
Are You Afraid of Darkseid?	#1	October 2021	Elliott Kalan; Kenny Porter; Calvin Kasulke; Dave Wielgosz; Collin Kelly; Jackson Lanzing; Ed Brisson; Terry Blas; Jeremy Haun	Mike Norton; Max Dunbar; Rob Guillory; Pablo M. Collar; Jesús Hervás; Christoper Mitten; Garry Brown; Tony Akins; Moritat	Allen Passalaqua; Luis Guerrero; Wil Quintana; Eva de la Cruz; Tony Aviña; Marissa Louise; Moritat	
Aquaman 80th Anniversary 100-Page Super Spectacular	#1	August 2021	Jeff Parker; Geoff Johns; Michael Moreci; Stephanie Phillips; Shawn Aldridge; Marguerite Bennett; Cavan Scott; Dan Watters; Dan Jurgens; Chuck Brown; Brandon Thomas	Evan Shaner; Paul Pelletier; Norm Rapmund; Pop Mhan; Hendry Prasetya; Tom Derenick; Trung Le Nguyen; Scot Eaton; Miguel Mendoça; Daniel Henriques; Steve Epting; Valentine de Landro; Diego Olortegui; Wade Von Grawbadger	Evan Shaner; Hi-Fi; Tony Aviña; Ulises Arreola; Nick Filardi; Jordie Bellaire; Romulo Fajardo Jr. Jeromy Cox; Marissa Louise; Adriano Lucas	
Batman: Fear State Alpha	#1	August 2021	James Tynion IV	Riccardo Federici	Chris Sotomayor	
Batman: The Audio Adventures Special	#1	October 2021	Dennis McNicholas; Bobby Moynihan; Heidi Gardner; Paul Scheer; Ike Barinholtz	Leonardo Romero; Rich Ellis; Anthony Marques; J. Bone; German Peralta; Emma Kubert; Roberto Poggi; Jon Mikel; Jacob Edgar; Juni Ba; Derec Donovan; Jesūs Hervās	Mike Spicer; Dave Stewart; Kristian Rossi; Hi-Fi; Nick Filardi; Rex Lokus; David Baron	
Batman: The Long Halloween Special	#1	October 2021	Jeph Loeb; Tim Sale	Tim Sale	Brennan Wagner	
Batman: Fear State Omega	#1	November 2021	James Tynion IV	Guillem March; Trevor Hairsine; Ryan Benjamin; Christian Duce; Riccardo Federici	Chris Sotomayor	
Batman Secret Files: Clownhunter	#1	August 2021	Ed Brisson	Rosi Kämpe	Andrew Dalhouse	
Batman Secret Files: The Gardener	#1	November 2021	James Tynion IV	Christian Ward		
Batman Secret Files: Huntress	#1	July 2021	Mariko Tamaki	David Lapham	Patricia Mulvihill	
Batman Secret Files: Miracle Molly	#1	September 2021	James Tynion IV	Dani	Lee Loughridge	
Batman Secret Files: Peacekeeper-One	#1	October 2021	James Tynion IV; Ed Brisson	Joshua Hixson	Roman Stevens	
Batman Secret Files: The Signal	#1	July 2021	Tony Patrick	Christian Duce	Luis Guerrero	
Batman/Superman: The Authority Special	#1	November 2021	Phillip Kennedy Johnson	Jonathan Glapion; Scott Hanna; Trevor Hairsine; Ben Templesmith	Rain Beredo	
Dark Crisis FCBD Special Edition	#0	May 2022	Joshua Williamson	Daniel Sampere; Jim Cheung		
DC Festival of Heroes: The Asian Superhero Celebration	#1	May 2021	Mariko Tamaki; Mihn Lé; Greg Pak; Aniz Adam Ansari; Ram V Dustin Nguyen; Alyssa Wong; Sarah Kuhn; Amy Chu; Pornsak Pinchetshote; Gene Luen Yang	Marcus To; Trung Le Nguyen; Sumit Kumar; Sami Basri; Audrey Mok; Dustin Nguyen; Sean Chen; Norm Rapmund; Victoria Ying; Marcio Takara; Alexandre Tefenkgi; Bernard Chang	Sebastian Cheng; Trung Le Nguyen; Romulo Fajardo Jr. Sunny Gho; Jordie Bellaire; Dustin Nguyen; Rain Beredo	
DC Pride	#1	June 2021	James Tynion IV; Steve Orlando; Vita Ayala; Mariko Tamaki; Sam Johns; Danny Lore; Sina Grace; Nicole Maines; Andrew Wheeler	Trung Le Nguyen; Stephen Byrne; Skylar Patridge; Amy Reeder; Klaus Janson; Lisa Sterle; Ro Stein; Ted Brandt; Rachael Stott; Luciano Vecchio	Trung Le Nguyen; Stephen Byrne; José Villarubia; Marissa Louise; Dave McCaig; Enrica Eren Angiolini; Ro Stein; Ted Brandt; Rex Lokus	
DC vs. Vampires: Hunters	#1	May 2022	Matthew Rosenberg	Neil Googe		
DC vs. Vampires: Killers	#1	June 2022	Matthew Rosenberg	Eduardo Mello; Mike Bowden		
Flashpoint Beyond	#0	April 2022	Geoff Johns	Eduardo Risso		
Gotham City Villains Anniversary Giant	#1	November 2021	Danny DeVito; Wes Craig; G. Willow Wilson; Phillip Kenedy Johnson; Nadia Shammas; Joshua Williamson; Stephanie Phillips; Dan Watters; Mairghread Scott	Dan Mora; Jason Wordie; Emma Ríos; Riccardo Federici; Max Raynor; Max Fiumara; Skylar Patridge; Ariela Kristantina	Tamra Bonvillain; Andworld Design; Jordie Bellaire; Sunny Gho; John Kalisz; Max Fiumara; Marissa Louise; Patricia Mulvihill	
Green Arrow 80th Anniversary 100-Page Super Spectacular	#1	June 2021	Mariko Tamaki; Tom Taylor; Stephanie Phillips; Mike Grell; Ram V Brandon Thomas; Devin K. Grayson; Phil Hester; Vita Ayala; Benjamin Percy; Jeff Lemire; Larry O'Neil	Javier Rodriguez; Nicola Scott; Chris Mooneyham; Mike Grell; Christopher Mitten; Jorge Corona; Max Fiumara; Phil Hester; Laura Braga; Otto Schmidt; Andrea Sorrentino; Jorge Fornés	Javier Rodriguez; Nicola Scott; Mike Spicer; Lovern Kindzierski; Ivan Plascencia; Mat Lopes; Max Fiumara; Patricia Mulvihill; Adriano Lucas; Otto Schmidt; Jordie Bellaire; Jorge Fornés	
I Am Batman	#0	August 2021	John Ridley	Travel Foreman	Rex Lokus	
Infinite Frontier	#0	March 2021	Joshua Williamson; James Tynion IV; Scott Snyder; Brian Michael Bendis; Becky Cloonan; Michael W. Conrad; Joëlle Jones; Tim Sheridan; Phillip Kennedy Johnson; Geoff Johns; Geoffrey Thorne	John Timms; David Marquez; Jorge Jimenez; Alitha Martinez; Mark Morales; Joëlle Jones; Stephen Byrne; Rafa Sandoval; Jordi Tarragona; Jamal Igle; Alex Maleev; Todd Nauck; Dexter Soy; Howard Porter; John Romita Jr. Klaus Janson	Alex Sinclair; Tamra Bonvillain; Tomeu Morey; Emilo Lopez; Jordie Bellaire; Stephen Byrne; Alejandro Sánchez; Hi-Fi; Brad Anderson	
Infinite Frontier: Secret Files	#1	June 2021	Joshua Williamson; Brandon Thomas; Stephanie Phillips; Dan Watters	Valentine De Landro; Inaki Miranda; Stephen Byrne; Phil Hester	Marissa Louise; Triona Farrell; Nick Filardi; Stephen Byrne	Released digitally as six issues from April 18, 2021
Justice League: Road to Dark Crisis	#1	May 2022	Joshua Williamson; Brandon Thomas; Chuck Brown; Phillip Kennedy Johnson; Stephanie Phillips; Jeremy Adams	Clayton Henry; Dan Jurgens; Emanuela Lupacchino; Leila del Duca; Fico Ossio		
Nubia: Coronation Special	#1	May 2022	Stephanie Williams; Vita Ayala	Alitha Martinez; Becky Cloonan; Darryl Banks; Jill Thompson; Marguerite Sauvage; Nikolas Draper-Ivey		
Peacemaker: Disturbing the Peace	#1	January 2022	Garth Ennis	Garry Brown	Lee Loughridge	
Sensational Wonder Woman Special	#1	March 2022	Paula Sevenbergen; Stephanie Phillips	Scott Kolins; Paul Pelletier; Alitha Martinez		
Shadow War Alpha	#1	March 2022	Joshua Williamson	Viktor Bogdanovic; Daniel Henriques	Mike Spicer	
Shadow War Omega	#1	May 2022	Joshua Williamson	Stephen Segovia		
Shadow War Zone	#1	May 2022	Joshua Williamson; Ed Brisson; Stephanie Phillips; Nadia Shammas	Trevor Hairsine; Mike Bowden; Ann Maulina		
Stargirl Spring Break Special	#1	May 2021	Geoff Johns	Todd Nauck; Bryan Hitch; Fred Hembeck	Hi-Fi; Alex Sinclair	
Strange Love Adventures	#1	February 2022	Stephanie Phillips; Rich Douek; Rex Ogle; Andrew Marino; Che Grayson; Devin K. Grayson; Jackson Lanzing; Collin Kelly; Ram V	Jon Sommariva; Scot Eaton; Wayne Faucher; Geraldo Borges; Pablo M. Collar; Jon Mikel; Roger Robinson; Christian Duce; Phil Hester; Erik Gapstur; Ande Parks	Rex Lokus; Hi-Fi; Nick Filardi; Dee Cunniffe; Tony Aviña; Enrica Eren Angiolini	
Superman & Robin Special	#1	January 2022	Peter J. Tomasi	Viktor Bogdanovic; Scott Hanna; Daniel Henriques; Matt Santorelli	Ivan Plascencia; Matt Herms	
'Tis the Season to be Freezin'	#1	December 2021	Alan Burnett; Paul Dini; Tee Franklin; Rich Bernatovech; Tara Roberts; Bobby Moynihan; Andrew Wheeler	Jordan Gibson; Yancy Labat; Travis Mercer; Norm Rapmund; Eric Battles; Pop Mhan; Meghan Hetrick	Monica Kubina; Tony Aviña; Andrew Dalhouse; Eva de La Cruz; Ivan Plascencia; Marissa Louise	
Wonder Woman 80th Anniversary 100-Page Spectacular	#1	October 2021	Becky Cloonan; Michael W. Conrad; Jordie Bellaire; Mark Waid; Tom King; Steve Orlando; G. Willow Wilson; Amy Reeder; Vita Ayala; Stephanie Phillips	Jim Cheung; Paulina Ganucheau; José Luis García-López; Joe Prado; Amy Reeder; Evan Shaner; Isaac Goodhart; Laura Braga; Marcio Takara; Meghan Hetrick	Marcelo Maiolo; Kendall Goode; Marissa Louise; Patricia Mulvihill; Evan Shaner; Jeremy Lawson; Romulo Fajardo Jr.	
Wonder Woman: The Adventures of Young Diana	#1	October 2021	Jordie Bellaire	Paulina Ganucheau	Kendall Goode	
Wonder Woman Day 2021 – Diana: Princess of the Amazons	#1	October 2021	Shannon Hale; Dean Hale	Victoria Ying	Lark Pien	
Wonder Woman Day 2021: Tempest Tossed	#1	October 2021	Laurie Halse Anderson	Leila del Duca	Kelly Fitzpatrick	
Wonder Woman Day Special Edition	#1	October 2021	Greg Rucka	Liam Sharp	Laura Martin	

== Critical reception ==
According to Comic Book Roundup, the entire event received an average rating of 8.6 out of 10 based on 110 reviews.

== Collected edition ==
Title	Material collected	Published date	ISBN
Infinite Frontier	Infinite Frontier #0–6, Infinite Frontier: Secret Files #1	April 2022	978-1779514240

== See also ==
- List of current DC Comics publications
