= List of Wonder Woman comics =

Printed depictions of the DC superhero

Wonder Woman has been prominently featured in various ongoing series, annuals, miniseries, graphic novels, and trade paperbacks published by DC Comics.

== Former titles ==
=== Wonder Woman '77 ===
Title	Material collected	Year	ISBN
Wonder Woman '77 Vol. 1	Wonder Woman '77 Special #1-2	2016	978-1401263287
Wonder Woman '77 Vol. 2	Wonder Woman '77 Special #3-4	2017	978-1401267889
Batman '66 Meets Wonder Woman '77	Batman '66 Meets Wonder Woman '77 #1-6	2017	978-1401273859
Wonder Woman '77 Meets the Bionic Woman	Wonder Woman '77 Meets the Bionic Woman #1-6	2017	978-1524103729

=== Sensation Comics featuring Wonder Woman ===
Title	Material collected	Year	ISBN
Sensation Comics featuring Wonder Woman Vol. 1	Sensation Comics featuring Wonder Woman #1-5	2015	978-1401253448
Sensation Comics featuring Wonder Woman Vol. 2	Sensation Comics featuring Wonder Woman #6-10	2015	978-1401258627
Sensation Comics featuring Wonder Woman Vol. 3	Sensation Comics featuring Wonder Woman #11-17	2016	978-1401261573

== Crossover titles ==
=== Superman/Wonder Woman ===
Title	Material collected	Year	ISBN
Superman/Wonder Woman Vol. 1: Power Couple	Superman/Wonder Woman #1-6	2014	978-1401253462
Superman/Wonder Woman Vol. 2: War and Peace	Superman/Wonder Woman #8-12; Superman/Wonder Woman Annual #1; Wonder Woman: Futures End #1; Superman/Wonder Woman: Futures End #1	2015	978-1401253479
Superman/Wonder Woman Vol. 3: Casualties of War	Superman/Wonder Woman #13-17	2015	978-1401257682
Superman/Wonder Woman Vol. 4: The Dark Truth	Superman/Wonder Woman #18-24	2016	978-1401263225
Superman/Wonder Woman Vol. 5: A Savage End	Superman/Wonder Woman #25-30	2016	978-1401265458

== Graphic novels ==
Title	Year	ISBN
Wonder Woman: Earth One Vol. 1	2016	978-1401229788
Wonder Woman: Earth One Vol. 2	2018	978-1401281175
Wonder Woman: Earth One Vol. 3	2021	978-1779502070
Wonder Woman: The Hiketeia	2003 (paperback); 2013 (hardcover)	SC: 978-1563899140; HC: 978-8866914211
Wonder Woman: Spirit of Truth	2001	978-1563898617
Wonder Woman: The True Amazon	2016	978-1401249014
Wonder Woman Historia: The Amazons	2022–2023	978-1779521354
Wonder Woman: Warbringer	2017	978-0141387376

== Collected editions ==
The five volumes of Wonder Woman have been collected in various hardcover and trade paperback books.

=== The Wonder Woman Chronicles ===
Title	Material collected	Year	ISBN
The Wonder Woman Chronicles Vol. 1	All Star Comics #8; Sensation Comics #1–9; Wonder Woman #1	2010	978-1401226442
The Wonder Woman Chronicles Vol. 2	Sensation Comics #10–14; Wonder Woman #2–3; Comic Cavalcade #1	2011	978-1401232405
The Wonder Woman Chronicles Vol. 3	Sensation Comics #15–18; Wonder Woman #4–5; Comic Cavalcade #2	2012	978-1401236922

=== DC Archive Editions ===
Title	Material collected	Year	ISBN
Wonder Woman Archives Vol. 1	All Star Comics #8; Sensation Comics #1–12; Wonder Woman #1	1998	978-1563894022
Wonder Woman Archives Vol. 2	Sensation Comics #13–17; Wonder Woman #2–4	2000	978-1563895944
Wonder Woman Archives Vol. 3	Sensation Comics #18–24; Wonder Woman #5–7	2002	978-1563898143
Wonder Woman Archives Vol. 4	Sensation Comics #25–32; Wonder Woman #8–9	2004	978-1401201456
Wonder Woman Archives Vol. 5	Sensation Comics #33–40; Wonder Woman #10–12	2007	978-1401212704
Wonder Woman Archives Vol. 6	Sensation Comics #41–48; Wonder Woman #13–15	2010	978-1401227340
Wonder Woman Archives Vol. 7	Sensation Comics #49–56; Wonder Woman #16–18	2012	978-1401237431
Wonder Woman: The Amazon Princess Archives Vol. 1	Wonder Woman #98–110	2013	978-1401238650

=== Showcase Presents ===
Title	Material collected	Year	ISBN
Showcase Presents Wonder Woman Vol. 1	Wonder Woman #98–117	2007	978-1401213732
Showcase Presents Wonder Woman Vol. 2	Wonder Woman #118–137	2008	978-1401219482
Showcase Presents Wonder Woman Vol. 3	Wonder Woman #138–156	2009	978-1401225247
Showcase Presents Wonder Woman Vol. 4	Wonder Woman #157–177	2011	1-4012-3289-2

=== DC Finest ===
Title	Material collected	Year	ISBN
Wonder Woman: Introducing Wonder Woman	Wonder Woman (vol. 1) #1-4, All Star Comics #8, Sensation Comics #1-18, Comic Cavalcade #1-2	2025	978-1799503361
Wonder Woman: Enter the Cheetah	Wonder Woman (vol. 1) #5-9, Sensation Comics #19-34, Comic Cavalcade #3-7, All Star Comics #20	2026	978-1799507444
Wonder Woman: Judgment in Infinity!	Wonder Woman (vol. 1) #286-305, The New Teen Titans #11-12, DC Comics Presents #41	2027	978-1799515081
Wonder Woman: The Legend of Wonder Woman	Wonder Woman (vol. 1) #306-329, The Legend of Wonder Woman (vol. 1) #1-4, DC Comics Presents #76, Blue Devil #10	2025	978-1799502012
Wonder Woman: Origins & Omens	Wonder Woman (vol. 3) #14-35, Outsiders: Five of a Kind - Wonder Woman/Grace #1, The Brave and the Bold (vol. 3) #7	2024	978-1779528346
Wonder Woman: Dawn Before Darkness	Wonder Woman (vol. 3) #36-44 and 600, Secret Six (vol. 3) #10-14, Blackest Night: Wonder Woman #1-3, DCU Halloween Special '09 #1	2026	978-1799508113

=== DC Compact Comics ===
Title	Material collected	Year	ISBN
Wonder Woman: Earth One	Wonder Woman: Earth One Vol. 1-3	2024	978-1779527332
Wonder Woman: Blood and Guts	Wonder Woman (vol. 4) #1-12	2025	978-1799502494

=== Wonder Woman ===
Title	Material collected	Year	ISBN
Wonder Woman: The Golden Age Vol. 1	All-Star Comics #8; Comic Cavalcade #1; Sensation Comics #1-14; Wonder Woman #1-3	2017	978-1401274443
Wonder Woman: The Golden Age Vol. 2	Comic Cavalcade #2-5; Sensation Comics #15-24; Wonder Woman #4-7	2018	978-1401285364
Wonder Woman: The Golden Age Vol. 3	Comic Cavalcade #6-8; Sensation Comics #25-36; Wonder Woman #8-11; The Big All-American Comic Book	2019	978-1401291907
Wonder Woman: The Golden Age Omnibus Vol. 1	All-Star Comics #8; Comic Cavalcade #1-5; Sensation Comics #1-24; Wonder Woman #1-7	2016	978-1401264963
Wonder Woman: The Golden Age Omnibus Vol. 2	Comic Cavalcade #6-13; Sensation Comics #25-48; Wonder Woman #8-15; The Big All-American Comic Book	2017	978-1401271466
Wonder Woman: The Golden Age Omnibus Vol. 3	Comic Cavalcade #14-22; Sensation Comics #49-69; Wonder Woman #16-25	2018	978-1401280826
Wonder Woman: The Golden Age Omnibus Vol. 4	Comic Cavalcade #23-29; Sensation Comics #70-91; Wonder Woman #26-36	2020	978-1401294793
Wonder Woman: The Golden Age Omnibus Vol. 5	Action Comics #142; Sensation Comics #92-104; Wonder Woman #37-47	2023	978-1779506672
Wonder Woman: The Golden Age Omnibus Vol. 6	Sensation Comics #105-106; Wonder Woman #48-71	2024	978-1779525970
Wonder Woman: The Silver Age Omnibus Vol. 1	Wonder Woman #98-123	2022	978-1779513366
Wonder Woman: The Silver Age Omnibus Vol. 2	Wonder Woman #124-149	2023	978-1779523150
Wonder Woman: The Silver Age Omnibus Vol. 3	Wonder Woman #150-177	2026	978-1799503019
Diana Prince: Wonder Woman Vol. 1	Wonder Woman #178–184	2008	978-1401216603
Diana Prince: Wonder Woman Vol. 2	Wonder Woman #185–189; Superman's Girlfriend Lois Lane #93; The Brave and the Bold #87	2008	978-1401218256
Diana Prince: Wonder Woman Vol. 3	Wonder Woman #190–198; World's Finest #204	2008	978-1401219475
Diana Prince: Wonder Woman Vol. 4	Wonder Woman #199–204; The Brave and the Bold #105	2009	978-1401221508
Wonder Woman: Diana Prince - Celebrating the 60's Book One (cancelled)	Wonder Woman #178-194	2020	978-1401295592
Wonder Woman: Diana Prince - Celebrating the '60s Omnibus	Wonder Woman #178-196, #199-204; Superman's Girlfriend Lois Lane #93; The Brave and the Bold #87, 105; Adventure Comics #397; World's Finest Comics #204	2018	9781401291662
Wonder Woman: The Twelve Labors	Wonder Woman #212–222	2012	978-1401234942
Huntress: Darknight Daughter; The Huntress: Origins	DC Super Stars #17; Batman Family #18-20; the Huntress back-up stories from Wonder Woman #271-287, 289-290 and 294–295	2006; 2020	978-1401209131; 978-1779500724

=== Wonder Woman (vol. 2) ===
Title	Material collected	Year	ISBN
Wonder Woman by George Perez Vol. 1	Wonder Woman (vol. 2) #1-14	2016	SC: 978-1401263751
Wonder Woman by George Perez Vol. 2	Wonder Woman (vol. 2) #15-24, Annual #1	2017	SC: 978-1401269067
Wonder Woman by George Perez Vol. 3	Wonder Woman (vol. 2) #25-35	2018	SC: 978-1401278328
Wonder Woman by George Perez Vol. 4	Wonder Woman (vol. 2) #36-45, Annual #2	2020	SC: 978-1401291266
Wonder Woman by George Perez Vol. 5	Wonder Woman (vol. 2) #46-57 and Who's Who #3-4, 7–8, 13, 16	2021	SC: 978-1779502285
Wonder Woman by George Perez Vol. 6	Wonder Woman (vol. 2) #58-62 and War of the Gods #1-4	2021	978-1779510303
Wonder Woman by George Perez Omnibus Vol. 1	Wonder Woman (vol. 2) #1-24, Annual #1	2015	HC: 978-1401255473
Wonder Woman by George Perez Omnibus Vol. 2	Wonder Woman (vol. 2) #25-45, Annual #2	2017	HC: 978-1401272388
Wonder Woman by George Perez Omnibus Vol. 3	Wonder Woman (vol. 2) #46-62, 168–169, 600; War of the Gods #1-4	2018	HC: 978-1401280390
Wonder Woman: War of the Gods	War of the Gods #1-4; Wonder Woman (vol. 2) #58-62	2016	978-1401261078
Wonder Woman Book 1: The Last True Hero	Wonder Woman (vol. 2) #63-64, 66–75, Annual #3, Special #1	2020	9781779500366
Wonder Woman Book 2: Ares Rising	Wonder Woman (vol. 2) #77-89, DC Retroactive: Wonder Woman '90s #1.	2021	978-1779507488
Wonder Woman: The Contest	Wonder Woman (vol. 2) #0, 90–93	1995	978-1563891946
Wonder Woman by Mike Deodato	Wonder Woman (vol. 2) #0, 85, 90–100	2016	SC: 978-1401261061
Wonder Woman by John Byrne Vol. 1	Wonder Woman (vol. 2) #101-114	2017	HC: 978-1401270841
Wonder Woman by John Byrne Vol. 2	Wonder Woman (vol. 2) #115-124, Annual #5-6	2018	HC: 978-1401280727
Wonder Woman by John Byrne Vol. 3	Wonder Woman (vol. 2) #125-136	2019	978-1401292249
Batman by Brian K. Vaughan	Batman #588-590, Detective Comics #787, Batman: Gotham City Secret Files and Origins #1 and Wonder Woman (vol. 2) #160-161	2017	978-1401268381
Wonder Woman: Gods of Gotham	Wonder Woman (vol. 2) #164-167	2001	
Wonder Woman by Phil Jimenez Omnibus	Wonder Woman (vol. 2) #164–188; Wonder Woman: Our Worlds At War #1; Wonder Woman Secret Files and Origins #3; Teen Titans/Outsiders Secret Files and Origins 2003	2019	978-1401288570
Wonder Woman: Paradise Lost	Wonder Woman (vol. 2) #164–170; Wonder Woman Secret Files and Origins #2	2002	978-1563897924
Wonder Woman: Paradise Found	Wonder Woman (vol. 2) #171–177; Wonder Woman Secret Files and Origins #3	2003	978-1563899560
Wonder Woman by Walt Simonson & Jerry Ordway	Wonder Woman (vol. 2) #189-194	2019	SC: 978-1401285883
Wonder Woman by Greg Rucka Vol. 1	Wonder Woman: The Hiketeia; Wonder Woman (vol. 2) #195-205	2016	SC: 978-1401263324
Wonder Woman by Greg Rucka Vol. 2	Wonder Woman (vol. 2) #206-217; The Flash (vol. 2) #219	2017	SC: 978-1401271176
Wonder Woman by Greg Rucka Vol. 3	Wonder Woman (vol. 2) #218-226; Blackest Night: Wonder Woman #1-3	2019	978-1401293420
Wonder Woman: Mission's End	Wonder Woman (vol. 2) #218–226	2006	978-1401210939

=== Wonder Woman (vol. 3) ===
Title	Material collected	Year	ISBN
Wonder Woman: Who Is Wonder Woman?	Wonder Woman (vol. 3) #1–4, Annual (vol. 2) #1	2008; 2017	Hardcover 978-1401212346; Paperback 978-1401272333
Wonder Woman: Love and Murder	Wonder Woman (vol. 3) #6–10	2007	978-1401217082
Wonder Woman: Amazons Attack!	One-page recaps of Wonder Woman (vol. 3) #11–13; Amazons Attack! #1-6	2007	978-1401215439
Wonder Woman: The Circle	Wonder Woman (vol. 3) #14–19	2008	978-1401219321
Wonder Woman: Ends of the Earth	Wonder Woman (vol. 3) #20–25	2009	978-1401221362
Wonder Woman: Rise of the Olympian	Wonder Woman (vol. 3) #26–33	2009	978-1401225131
Wonder Woman: Warkiller	Wonder Woman (vol. 3) #34–39	2010	978-1401227791
Wonder Woman: Contagion	Wonder Woman (vol. 3) #40–44	2010	978-1401229207
Wonder Woman by Gail Simone Omnibus	Wonder Woman (vol. 3) #14–44, 600 and Sensation Comics featuring Wonder Woman #1	2020	978-1401292492
Wonder Woman: Odyssey Vol. 1	Wonder Woman #600–606	2012	978-1401230777
Wonder Woman: Odyssey Vol. 2	Wonder Woman #607–614	2013	978-1401234317

=== Wonder Woman (vol. 4): The New 52 ===
Title	Material collected	Year	ISBN
Wonder Woman Vol. 1: Blood	Wonder Woman (vol. 4) #1–6	2012	978-1401235635
Wonder Woman Vol. 2: Guts	Wonder Woman (vol. 4) #7–12	2013	978-1401238094
Wonder Woman Vol. 3: Iron	Wonder Woman (vol. 4) #0, 13–18	2013	978-1401242619
Wonder Woman Vol. 4: War	Wonder Woman (vol. 4) #19–23.1	2014	978-1401246082
Wonder Woman Vol. 5: Flesh	Wonder Woman (vol. 4) #23.2, 24–29	2014	978-1401250973
Wonder Woman Vol. 6: Bones	Wonder Woman (vol. 4) #30-35; Secret Origins (vol. 3) #6	2015	978-1401253509
Wonder Woman Vol. 7: War-Torn	Wonder Woman (vol. 4) #36-40; Annual (vol. 3) #1	2015	978-1401256791
Wonder Woman Vol. 8: A Twist of Faith	Wonder Woman (vol. 4) #41-47	2015	978-1401261641
Wonder Woman Vol. 9: Resurrection	Wonder Woman (vol. 4) #48-52	2017	978-1401265847
Deluxe editions
Wonder Woman: Blood and Guts: The Deluxe Edition	Wonder Woman (vol. 4) #0-12	2023	978-1779523167
Absolute editions
Absolute Wonder Woman by Brian Azzarello and Cliff Chiang Vol. One	Wonder Woman (vol. 4) #0-18	2016	978-1401268480
Absolute Wonder Woman by Brian Azzarello and Cliff Chiang Vol. Two	Wonder Woman (vol. 4) #19-35	2018	978-1401277499

=== Wonder Woman (vol. 5): DC Rebirth ===
Title	Material collected	Year	ISBN
Wonder Woman Vol. 1: The Lies	Wonder Woman: Rebirth #1; Wonder Woman (vol. 5) #1, 3, 5, 7, 9, 11	2017	978-1401267780
Wonder Woman Vol. 2: Year One	Wonder Woman (vol. 5) #2, 4, 6, 8, 10, 12, 14	2017	978-1401268800
Wonder Woman Vol. 3: The Truth	Wonder Woman (vol. 5) #13, 15, 17, 19, 21, 23, 25	2017	978-1401271411
Wonder Woman Vol. 4: Godwatch	Wonder Woman (vol. 5) #16, 18, 20, 22, 24; Annual (vol. 4) #1	2017	978-1401274603
Wonder Woman Vol. 5: Heart of the Amazon	Wonder Woman (vol. 5) #26-30, stories from Annual (vol. 4) #1; Wonder Woman: Steve Trevor #1	2018	978-1401277345
Wonder Woman Vol. 6: Children of the Gods	Wonder Woman (vol. 5) #31-37	2018	978-1401284244
Wonder Woman Vol. 7: Amazons Attacked	Wonder Woman (vol. 5) #38-45	2018	978-1401285340
Wonder Woman Vol. 8: Dark Gods	Wonder Woman (vol. 5) #46-50, Annual (vol. 4) #2	2019	978-1401289010
Wonder Woman Vol. 9: The Enemy of Both Sides	Wonder Woman (vol. 5) #51-55, The 75th Anniversary Special #1; stories from Justice League 100-Page Giant #1-2	2019	978-1401292058
Wonder Woman and Justice League Dark: The Witching Hour	Wonder Woman (vol. 5) #56-57; Wonder Woman and Justice League Dark: The Witching Hour #1; Justice League Dark (vol. 2) #4 and Justice League Dark and Wonder Woman: The Witching Hour #1	2019	978-1401290733
Wonder Woman Vol. 1: The Just War	Wonder Woman (vol. 5) #58-65	2019	978-1401294571
Wonder Woman Vol. 2: Love is a Battlefield	Wonder Woman (vol. 5) #66-73	2019	978-1401294571
Wonder Woman Vol. 3: Loveless	Wonder Woman (vol. 5) #74-81	2020	978-1779502537
Wonder Woman Vol. 4: The Four Horsewomen	Wonder Woman (vol. 5) #82-83, #750-758 Annual (vol. 4) #3	2021	978-1779509109
Wonder Woman: Lords & Liars	Wonder Woman (vol. 5) #759-769	2021	978-1779510228
Wonder Woman Vol.1: Afterworlds	Wonder Woman (vol. 5) #770-779	2021	978-1779512796
Wonder Woman Vol.2: Through A Glass Darkly	Wonder Woman (vol. 5) #780-784, Wonder Woman 2021 Annual #1; Wonder Woman 80th Anniversary 100-Page Super Spectacular #1	2022	978-1779516602
Trial of the Amazons	Wonder Woman #785-786, Nubia and the Amazons #6, Trial of the Amazons #1-2, Trial of the Amazons: Wonder Girl #1-2	October 2022	978-1779516824
Wonder Woman Vol.3: The Villainy of Our Fears	Wonder Woman (vol. 5) #787-794	2023	978-1779519849
Wonder Woman Vol.4: Revenge of the Gods	Wonder Woman (vol. 5) #795-800	2023	978-1779520456
Deluxe Editions
Wonder Woman Rebirth Deluxe Edition Book 1	Wonder Woman: Rebirth #1; Wonder Woman (vol. 5) #1-14	2017	978-1779500403
Wonder Woman Rebirth Deluxe Edition Book 2	Wonder Woman (vol. 5) #15-25, Annual (vol. 4) #1; material from DC Holiday Special 2017	2018	978-1401280932
Wonder Woman Rebirth Deluxe Edition Book 3	Wonder Woman (vol. 5) #26-30, stories from Annual (vol. 4) #1; The 75th Anniversary Special #1	2020	978-1401285722

=== Wonder Woman (vol. 6): Infinite Frontier ===
Title	Material collected	Year	ISBN
Wonder Woman Vol. 1: Outlaw	Wonder Woman (vol. 6) #1-6	2024	978-1779525451
Wonder Woman Vol. 2: Sacrifice	Wonder Woman (vol. 6) #7-13	2024	978-1779528407
Wonder Woman Vol. 3: Fury	Wonder Woman (vol. 6) #14-19	2025	978-1799501442
Wonder Woman Vol. 4: The Island of Mice and Men	Wonder Woman (vol. 6) #22-30	2026	978-1799503125
Wonder Woman Vol. 5: The Wonder War Act I	Wonder Woman (vol. 5) #31-36	2026	978-1799509394

=== Absolute Wonder Woman ===
Title	Material collected	Year	ISBN
Absolute Wonder Woman Vol. 1: The Last Amazon	Absolute Wonder Woman #1-7	2025	978-1799505303
Absolute Wonder Woman Vol. 2: As My Mothers Made Me	Absolute Wonder Woman #8-14	2026	978-1799507543
Absolute Wonder Woman Vol. 3: Season of the Witch	Absolute Wonder Woman #15-20, 2026 Annual #1	2026	978-1799508953

== Miscellaneous collections ==
Title	Material collected	Year	ISBN
The Comic Cavalcade Archive Edition Vol. 1	Comic Cavalcade #1–3	2005	978-1401206581
Wonder Woman: The Greatest Stories Ever Told	Sensation Comics #1; Wonder Woman #28, 99, 108, 163, 178, 214, 286; Wonder Woman (vol. 2) #20, 170; Wonder Woman: Spirit of Truth	2007	978-1401212162
Flashpoint: World of Flashpoint featuring Wonder Woman	Flashpoint: Emperor Aquaman #1-3; Flashpoint: The Outsider #1-3; Flashpoint: Lois Lane and the Resistance #1-3; Flashpoint: Wonder Woman and the Furies #1-3	2012	978-1401234102
The Legend of Wonder Woman	The Legend of Wonder Woman #1-4	2016	978-1401267285
Wonder Woman: A Celebration of 75 Years	All-Star Comics #8; Sensation Comics #1; Wonder Woman #7, 28, 64, 93, 99, 107, 142, 177, 179, 195, 204, 288, 600; Wonder Woman (vol. 2) #1, Wonder Woman (vol. 3) #0; Justice League: New Frontier Special #1; Sensation Comics Featuring Wonder Woman #1, 7	2016	978-1401265120
Wonder Woman: Forgotten Legends	The Legend of Wonder Woman #1-4, Wonder Woman #318; Wonder Woman Annual (vol. 2) #2; Wonder Woman Gallery	2018	978-1401277956
The Brave and the Bold: Batman and Wonder Woman	The Brave and the Bold: Batman and Wonder Woman #1-6	2019	978-1401283438
Wonder Woman: Agent of Peace Vol. 1: Global Guardian	Wonder Woman: Agent of Peace #1-10	2021	978-1779512833
Sensational Wonder Woman	Sensational Wonder Woman #1-7	2021	978-1779512666
Wonder Woman: Agent of Peace Vol. 2	Wonder Woman: Agent of Peace #12-23	2022	978-1779515094
Wonder Woman: Evolution	Wonder Woman: Evolution #1-8	2022	978-1779516862
Wonder Woman Black & Gold	Wonder Woman Black & Gold #1-6	2023	978-1779520449
Wonder Woman: The Adventures of Young Diana	Wonder Woman #770-779, 785-796	2024	978-1779527134

== See also ==
- List of Batman comics
- List of Superman comics
