= Marvel's Voices =

Official Marvel podcast, comic books, and webcomics spotlighting diversity

- Language: American English

Cast and voices
- Hosted by: Angélique Roché

Publication
- No. of seasons: 5
- No. of episodes: 89

Related
- Website: www.marvel.com/watch/digital-series/marvel-s-voices

Marvel's Voices is a podcast hosted by journalist, producer, and author Angélique Roché. Each episode, Roché interviews and has "deep-diving conversations with storytellers" associated with Marvel Entertainment. The podcast puts on emphasis "diversity in storytelling" and creators of color. Its popularity resulted in a number of spin-off comic books starting in 2020.

== Show history ==
The original idea for Marvel's Voices was developed by Sana Amanat and Judy Stephens in order to spotlight people of color within the Marvel Universe on their Women of Marvel podcast. This became a short segment on the podcast, which was then spun-off into a new "a long-form interview show spotlighting the stories and work of people of color who either worked with or had a strong connection to the Marvel Universe." Roché came aboard as host in February 2018 and the first episode came out in May.

Marvel's Voices #1 came out two years later in 2020 and was inspired by the podcast. A number of other comics since then have been published under the banner of Marvel's Voices, including a Marvel's Voices webcomic which went for 100 issues and spun-off the Avengers Academy: Marvel's Voices on Marvel Unlimited.

== Episodes ==
=== Season 1 ===
No.	Title	Original release date
1	"Jeremie Harris, FX's Legion"	May 4, 2018
2	"Sana Amanat, Marvel"	April 19, 2018
3	"Jeffrey Bowyer-Chapman, UnREAL"	April 27, 2018
4	"A'ja Wilson, First Round WNBA Draft Pick"	May 3, 2018
5	"Greg Pak, Writer of Planet Hulk"	May 17, 2018
6	"Franchesca Ramsey, Comedian and Accidental Activist"	May 31, 2018
7	"Olivia Holt & Aubrey Joseph, Marvel's Cloak & Dagger"	June 14, 2018
8	"Martellus Bennett, Creative Director of Awesomeness"	June 28, 2018
9	"Gabrielle Dennis, 'Marvel's Luke Cage'"	July 12, 2018
10	"Cheo Hodari Coker, 'Marvel's Luke Cage' Showrunner"	July 27, 2018
11	"Matteo Lane, Comedian"	August 9, 2018
12	"Jacinda Chew, Insomniac Games Art Director"	August 23, 2018
13	"Kathreen Khavari, Voice of Ms. Marvel"	September 6, 2018
14	"Jessica Henwick, 'Marvel's Iron Fist'"	September 20, 2018
15	"Ronny Chieng, Stand-Up Comedian and Actor"	October 4, 2018
16	"Kris Anka, Artist for Runaways"	November 1, 2018
17	"Mariko Tamaki, Writer of X-23"	November 15, 2018
18	"Saladin Ahmed, Writer of Miles Morales: Spider-Man"	November 29, 2018
19	"Kimiko Glenn, of Spider-Man: Into the Spider-Verse"	January 10, 2019
20	"Lyrica Okano, 'Marvel's Runaways'"	January 24, 2019
21	"Chris Robinson, Marvel Comics Assistant Editor"	February 7, 2019
22	"Jesse J. Holland, Author of Black Panther Novelization"	February 21, 2019
23	"Marcus To, X-Men Artist"	March 7, 2019
24	"Rachael Holmes, 'Wolverine: The Lost Trail' Actor"	March 20, 2019
25	"James Monroe Iglehart, 'Hamilton' Actor"	April 4, 2019
26	"Janelle James, Comedian"	April 18, 2019
27	"Nilah Magruder, 'Marvel Rising' Writer"	May 2, 2019
28	"Evan Narcisse, 'Rise of the Black Panther' Writer"	May 16, 2019
29	"Meghan C. Rogers & Gloria Reuben of Marvel's 'Cloak & Dagger'"	May 30, 2019
30	"Preeti Chhibber, Author of "Spider-Man: Far From Home: Peter and Ned's Ultimate Travel Journal""	June 13, 2019
31	"Dax ExclamationPoint on Combining Drag & Cosplay"	June 27, 2019
32	"Jason Reynolds, Writer of 'Miles Morales: Spider-Man'"	July 11, 2019
33	"Ira Madison III, Writer and Co-Host of "Keep It!""	July 25, 2019
34	"Jen Bartel, Eisner Award-Winning Illustrator and Comic Artist"	August 8, 2019
35	"Ray-Anthony Height, Illustrator"	August 22, 2019
36	"Vita Ayala, Writer of 'Age of X-Man: Prisoner X'"	September 5, 2019
37	"Alitha Martinez, Artist for Fearless & Moon Girl and Devil Dinosaur"	September 19, 2019
38	"Paul Bae and Mischa Stanton, Director and Sound Designer, Marvels"	October 3, 2019
39	"This Week in Marvel: Elevating Black Voices in Comics"	June 12, 2020
40	"Method Man and the Coming of Galactus"	December 7, 2020
41	"Nic Stone and Writing "Shuri""	December 14, 2020
42	"Roxane Gay and Writing in Wakanda"	December 21, 2020
43	"BONUS: Jason Reynolds, Writer of 'Miles Morales: Spider-Man'"	December 28, 2020
44	"Alyssa Wong and Writing Doctor Aphra"	January 11, 2021
45	"Marvel World Wide"	January 18, 2021
46	"Outlawed: Eve L. Ewing"	January 25, 2021
47	"Sandra Saad and Voicing Kamala Khan"	February 1, 2021
48	"Gene Luen Yang and Writing Shang-Chi"	February 8, 2021
49	"Jeffrey Veregge and the Storytelling Process"	February 15, 2021
50	"Javier Garron & Natacha Bustos and Drawing for Comics"	February 22, 2021
51	"Tochi Onyebuchi & Stephanie Williams and Their Comics Journeys"	March 1, 2021
52	"Rebecca Roanhorse & Weyshoyot Alvitre and Spotlighting Echo"	March 8, 2021
53	"Anthony Mackie & Malcolm Spellman on Marvel Studios' The Falcon and the Winter Soldier"	June 1, 2021

=== Season 2 ===
No.	Title	Original release date
54	"Chris Cooper on Pride and Comics"	June 28, 2021
55	"Justin A. Reynolds on Miles Morales"	July 5, 2021
56	"Kalinda Vazquez & Christopher Priest On Donning the Stars & Stripes"	July 12, 2021
57	"Pharoahe Monch on Hip Hop & Fandom"	July 19, 2021
58	"Terry Blas On Reptil and Comunidades"	July 26, 2021
59	"José Alaniz & Day Al-Mohamed on Disability Representation in Comics"	August 2, 2021
60	"Darren Shan on Marvel's Voices: Identity"	August 9, 2021
61	"Gene Luen Yang On Writing Shang-Chi"	August 16, 2021
62	"Marvel's Wastelanders: Hawkeye Sneak Peek!"	October 4, 2021

=== Season 3 ===
No.	Title	Original release date
63	"A Celebration of Marvel's Voices: Legacy – Part I"	February 10, 2022
64	"First Look at The History of Marvel Comics: Black Panther"	February 14, 2022
65	"A Celebration of Marvel's Voices: Legacy – Part II"	February 17, 2022
66	"Symbiosis! The Evolution of Shuri and Wakanda with Nic Stone"	February 24, 2022
67	"Behind the Mic of Marvel's Wastelanders: Black Widow"	March 3, 2022
68	"Larry Hama, the Renaissance Man"	March 10, 2022
69	"From Intergalactic Emperor to Earthly Espionage: John Ridley on T'Challa's Next Chapter"	March 17, 2022
70	"Anyone Can Wear the Mask: 60 Years of Spider-People"	March 24, 2022
71	"Walter Mosley's Ben Grimm is The Next Big Thing"	March 31, 2022
72	"First Look at Marvel's Squirrel Girl: The Unbeatable Radio Show!"	April 18, 2022
73	"First Look at Marvel's Wastelanders: Wolverine"	June 13, 2022

=== Season 4 ===
No.	Title	Original release date
74	"Language to Letters w/ Janice Chiang"	August 25, 2022
75	"Creating Comics for Everyone w/ Fabian Nicieza"	September 8, 2022
76	"Marvel's Wastelanders: Doom, starting September 12th"	September 12, 2022
77	"Writing the Wastelands & Translating Wolverine: Fiction Podcasts w/ James Kim & Alejandra Lopez"	September 15, 2022
78	"Marvel Mythos and African Folklore w/ Juni Ba"	September 22, 2022
79	"Moon Girl Team-Ups w/ Mohale Mashigo"	September 29, 2022
80	"Marvel in the Momoko-Verse"	October 6, 2022
81	"Writing Warrior Women for YA w/ Ibi Zoboi"	October 13, 2022

=== Season 5 ===
No.	Title	Original release date
82	"Making Marvel's Moon Girl and Devil Dinosaur"	February 23, 2023
83	"Writing Wakanda"	March 2, 2023
84	"Finding the Best Comics Talent"	March 9, 2023
85	"Designing Marvel Studios' Ant-Man and the Wasp: Quantumania"	March 16, 2023
86	"Writing She-Hulk, Miles Morales, and Spider-Punk"	March 23, 2023
87	"Weaving the Spider-Verse"	March 30, 2023
88	"Animating Spider-Man"	April 6, 2023
89	"Building Backstories and Book Festivals"	April 13, 2023

== Comic Books ==
Title	Writers	Artists	Published
Marvel's Voices #1	Vita Ayala, Kyle Baker, Chuck Brown, Roxane Gay, James Iglehart, Method Man, Rob Markman, Lenard Mckelvey, Brandon Montclare, Evan Narcisse, Anthony Piper, Brian Stelfreeze, Geoffrey Thorne, Luciano Vecchio, David Walker	Kyle Baker, Natacha Bustos, Bernard Chang, Sanford Greene, Ray-Anthony Height, Jj Kirby, Jahnoy Lindsay, Alitha E. Martinez, Anthony Piper, Khary Randolph, Damion Scott, Brian Stelfreeze, Luciano Vecchio, Brittney L. Williams	February 19, 2020
Marvel's Voices: Indigenous Voices #1	Taboo, Darcie Little Badger, B. Earl, Jeffrey Veregge, Rebecca Roanhorse, Stephen Graham Jones	Weshoyot Alvitre, David Cutler, Jeffrey Veregge, Kyle Charles	November 18, 2020
Marvel's Voices: Legacy #1	Ho Che Anderson, Danny Lore, Nnedi Okorafor, Tochi Onyebuchi, John Ridley, Angélique Roché, Stephanie Renee Williams	Natacha Bustos, Olivier Coipel, ChrisCross, Sean Hill, Valentine De Landro, Ken Lashley	February 24, 2021
Marvel's Voices: Pride #1	Vita Ayala, Terry Blas, Crystal Frasier, Kieron Gillen, Allan Heinberg, Tini Howard, Jj Kirby, Mike O'sullivan, Anthony Oliveira, Steve Orlando, Lilah Sturges, Mariko Tamaki, Luciano Vecchio, Leah Williams	Claudia Aguirre, Kris Anka, Jan Bazaldua, Jacopo Camagni, Derek Charm, Jim Cheung, Samantha Dodge, Joanna Estep, Paulina Ganucheau, Javier Garron, Rye Hickman, Jj Kirby, Jethro Morales, Luciano Vecchio, Brittney L. Williams	June 23, 2021
Marvel's Voices: Identity #1	Maurene Goo, Greg Pak, Christina Strain, Alyssa Wong, Gene Luen Yang, Sabir Pirzada	Mashal Ahmed, Jason Loo, Whilce Portacio, Marcus To	August 25, 2021
Marvel's Voices: Comunidades #1	Julio Anta, David Betancourt, Terry Blas, Edgar Delgado, Erica Harrell, Nico Leon, Yehudi Mercado, Daniel José Older, Claribel Ortega, Amparo Ortiz, Karla Pacheco, Juan Ponce, Desiree Proctor, Leonardo Romero, Alex Segura	Enid Balam, Gustavo Duarte, Mauro Fodra, Alba Glez, Carlos Gomez, Francisco Herrera, Nico Leon, Alitha E. Martinez, Paco Medina, Adriana Melo, Julius Ohta, German Peralta, Vanesa Del Rey, Leonardo Romero, Wilton Santos	December 8, 2021
Marvel's Voices: Heritage #1	Nyla Innuksuk, Rebecca Roanhorse, Bobby Wilson	Shaun Beyale, David Cutler, Natasha Donovan, James Terry	January 12, 2022
Marvel's Voices: Legacy (2022) #1	Natacha Bustos, Victor LaValle, Cody Ziglar, Jason Holtham, Maria Fröhlich	Natacha Bustos, Jahnoy Lindsay, Julian Shaw, Larry Houston, Eder Messias, Karen S. Darboe, Maria Fröhlich, Sean Damien Hill, Paris Alleyne	February 16, 2022
Marvel's Voices: Identity (2022) #1	Rina Ayuyang, Jeremy Holt, Emily Kim, Pornsak Pichetshote, Sabir Pirzada	Eric Koda, Creees Lee, Rickie Yagawa, Kei Zama	May 18, 2022
Marvel's Voices: Pride (2022) #1	Charlie Jane Anders, Christopher Cantwell, Danny Lore, Ira Madison, Andrew Wheeler, Alyssa Wong	Ted Brandt, Stephen Byrne, Scott Henderson, Lorenzo Susi, Lucas Werneck, Brittney L. Williams, Kei Zama	June 22, 2022
Marvel's Voices: Comunidades (2022) #1	Zoraida Córdova, Edgar Delgado, Carlos Hernandez, Fabian Nicieza, Alex Segura	Roge Antonio, Marcelo Costa, Paco Medina, Yasmin Flores Montanez, Luis Morocho, Dio Neves	September 28, 2022
Marvel's Voices: Wakanda Forever #1	Murewa Ayodele, Juni Ba, Adam Serwer, Karama Horne, Sheena C. Howard	Dotun Akande, Juni Ba, Alitha E. Martinez, Todd Harris, Marcus Williams, Juni Ba	February 15, 2023
Marvel's Voices: Spider-Verse #1	Vita Ayala, Saint Bodhi, Cheryl Lynn Eaton, Steve Foxe, Jeremy Holt, J Holtham, Jason Loo, Cody Ziglar	ChrisCross, Alberto Alburquerque, Jason Loo, Julian Shaw	April 12, 2023
Marvel's Voices: Pride (2023) #1	Stephen Byrne, Steve Foxe, Marieke Nijkamp, Stephanie Renee Williams	Stephen Byrne, Joanna Estep, Rosi Kampe, Bailie Rosenlund, Lorenzo Susi	June 14, 2023
Marvel's Voices: X-Men #1	Raphael Draccon, Jay Edidin, Al Ewing, Carolina Munhoz, Greg Pak, Jay Jurden	Daniel Bayliss, Jan Bazaldua, Jorge Corona, Marcelo Costa, Jethro Morales, Wilton Santos, Gustavo Alex Vargas Tataje, Nina Vakueva	August 16, 2023
Marvel's Voices: Avengers #1	Robbie Thompson, Utkarsh Ambudkar, Justina Ireland, Jason Concepcion	Sid Kotian, Tadam Gyadu, Karen S. Darboe, Moises Hidalgo	December 6, 2023
Marvel's Voices: Legends #1	Justina Ireland, David F. Walker, Ezra Claytan Daniels, Sheree Renée Thomas	Eder Messias, Karen S. Darboe, Sean Damien Hill, Julian Shaw	January 31, 2024
X-Men: The Wedding Special #1	Kieron Gillen, Tini Howard, Tate Brombal, Yoon Ha Lee, Wyatt Kennedy	Rachael Stott, Phillip Sevy, Emilio Pilliu, Stephen Byrne, Jenn St. Onge	May 29, 2024
Ghost Rider: Robbie Reyes Special #1	Melissa Flores, Carlos Hernandez, Felipe Smith	Daniel Bayliss, Jan Bazaldua, Moises Hidalgo	October 2, 2024
Kahhori: Reshaper of Worlds #1	Ryan Little, Arihhonni David, Kelly Lynne D'Angelo	Todd Harris, David Cutler, Jim Terry	November 6, 2024

== Infinity Comics ==
Title		Issues	Writer	Artist	Debut Date
Marvel's Voices	Iceman	#1–4	Luciano Vecchio		June 1, 2022
Marvel's Voices	Young Avengers	#5–10	Anthony Oliveira	Jethro Morales & Dijjo Lima	June 29, 2022
Marvel's Voices	Amadeus Cho	#11	John Tsuei	Lynne Yoshii	August 10, 2022
Marvel's Voices	America Chavez	#12–17	Juan Ponce	Alba Glez	August 17, 2022
Marvel's Voices	Miles Morales	#18	Mohale Mashigo	Julian Shaw	September 28, 2022
Marvel's Voices	Werewolf by Night	#19	Owl Goingback	Alison Sampson	October 5, 2022
Marvel's Voices	Nova	#20–25	Terry Blas	Bruno Oliveira	October 12, 2022
Marvel's Voices	Black Panther	#26	Cheryl Lynn Eaton	Nelson Daniel	November 24, 2022
Marvel's Voices	The Family Snikt	#27–32	Stephanie Renee Williams	Alan Robinson	November 30, 2022
Marvel's Voices	Crescent & Io	#33–36	Danny Ko	Jodi Nishijima	November 30, 2022
Marvel's Voices	Reptil	#37	Daniel José Older	Michael Shelfer	January 25, 2023
Marvel's Voices	Moon Girl	#38–43	Stephanie Williams	Julian Shaw	February 1, 2023
Marvel's Voices	Negasonic Teenage Warhead	#44-49	Andrew Wheeler	Carola Borelli	March 15, 2023
Marvel's Voices	Wave	#50	Greg Pak	Luigi Teruel	April 26, 2023
Marvel's Voices	Iron Fist Pei - Wayward Warrior	#51–56	Jeremy Holt	Guillermo Sanna	May 3, 2023
Marvel's Voices	Ayo & Aneka	#57	Wyatt Kennedy	Sumeyye Kesgi & KJ Díaz	June 14, 2023
Marvel's Voices	Runaways	#58–63	Terry Blas	Bruno Oliveira	June 21, 2023
Marvel's Voices	Echo - Dream Descent	#64–69	Melissa Flores	Kyle Charles	August 16, 2023
Marvel's Voices	Miles Morales	#70	David Betancourt	Alba Glez	September 27, 2023
Marvel's Voices	Nightshade	#71–74	Stephanie Williams	Hector Barros	October 4, 2023
Marvel's Voices	Loki Presents Bifrost and Furious	#75 & 83	Karla Pacheco	Roberta Ingranata	November 1, 2023
Marvel's Voices	Spider-Man India and Black Cat	#76–77	Preeti Chhibber	Alti Firmansyah	November 8, 2023
Marvel's Voices	White Tiger and Kraven the Hunter	#78–79	Alex Segura	Alba Glez	November 22, 2023
Marvel's Voices	Misty Knight and the Prowler	#80–81	J. Holtham	Julian Shaw	December 6, 2023
Marvel's Voices	Terrax the Tamer and Shang-Chi	#82	Jason Loo	Rickie Yagawa	December 20, 2023
Marvel's Voices	A-Force	#84–94	Cheryl Lynn Eaton	Federica Mancin	January 3, 2024
Marvel's Voices	Unlike Any Other	#95–100	Anthony Oliveira	Bailie Rosenlund	April 3, 2024
Kid Juggernaut: Marvel's Voices		#1–6	Emily Kim	Minkyu Jung	May 15, 2024
Avengers Academy: Marvel's Voices		#1–	Anthony Oliveira	Carola Borelli	June 26, 2024
