= Stephanie Williams (comics) =

American comic book writer

- Williams at Dragon Con in 2026
- Notable works: Wonder Woman, Street Sharks, Roots of Madness, Temporal

Stephanie Williams is an American comic book writer, who has written for various properties, including Wonder Woman, Moon Girl and Devil Dinosaur, and Street Sharks, as well as original series Roots of Madness and Temporal. She was nominated for the Eisner Award for Best Writer in 2026.

== Career ==
Williams started writing comics after the birth of her child. She published the webcomics Parenthood Activate, But What If Though, and Living Heroes, the last of which was a Kickstarter-funded superhero fancomic featuring Storm, She-Hulk, Misty Knight, and Monica Rambeau living together in a sitcom setting. Marvel hired Williams for a two-page story about Rambeau titled Panic at the Supermarket for the comic anthology Marvel's Voices: Legacy after reading the comic.

Williams co-wrote the 2021 limited series Nubia & the Amazons with Vita Ayala, starring the Amazon Nubia. The series introduced Bia, the first transgender Amazon in DC Comics. While unconfirmed in her debut issue, Williams verified the character's status as a trans woman on Twitter.

In 2025, Williams and artist Sas Milledge adapted Maggie Stiefvater's The Raven Boys into a graphic novel.

In 2023's Marvel's Voices: Pride, Williams wrote the short story What May Bloom, which introduced the character Logan Lewis, who operates as a superhero named Nightshade. Lewis is the cousin of existing character Tilda Johnson, who shares the same codename.

In 2024, Williams wrote the graphic novel Moon Girl and Devil Dinosaur: Wreck and Roll, a tie-in with the Moon Girl and Devil Dinosaur TV series.

In 2025, she wrote Roots of Madness, a creator-owned horror comic inspired by the life of Madam C. J. Walker, illustrated by Letizia Cadonici and published by Ignition Press. The same year, she wrote Temporal, a sci-fi heist series illustrated by Asiah Fulmore and published by Mad Cave Studios. Also in 2025, she wrote the Street Sharks comic miniseries for IDW Publishing. She has discussed being a fan of the original animated series as a child.

In June 2026 it was announced Williams would write the comic miniseries Vengeance Unchained: The Legend of Black Caesar with Shaquille O'Neal and illustrated by Ray-Anthony Height and Studio Skye-Tiger, based on the 18th-century pirate Black Caeser and set for release in October 2026. The same month, she was announced as the writer of Smile: Any Given Smile, a football-themed comic set in Smile franchise.

At the 2026 San Diego Comic-con, it was announced she would be writing the first ongoing series for the DC Comics superhero Vixen, to be illustrated by Khary Randolph.

== Awards and recognition ==
In 2026, Williams was nominated for the Eisner Award for Best Writer for her work on Street Sharks, Roots of Madness, and Temporal. Williams was the first Black woman to be nominated for the award, and was the second ever Black person to be nominated after Dwayne MacDuffie's nomination in 1995. She was also nominated for the Eisner Award for Best New Series for Temporal in the same year.

Outlets such as Comics Beat noted an initial lack of coverage for Williams's nominations in mainstream comics news outlets. Williams herself stated on Threads "It’s actually kinda wild that not one major comic news outlet ... have written any pieces about not only my historic Eisner nominations (first Black Woman and the second Black person since 95 for the Best Writer category) but also the amount of diverse nominations this year in total."

== Personal life ==
Williams graduated from the University of Illinois Chicago and worked in scientific research prior to entering the comics industry.

Williams is queer. In an interview with NPR, she discussed her experience with postpartum depression.

== Bibliography ==
=== DC Comics ===
- Wonder Woman: Black and Gold ("A Common Motivator", 2021, illustrated by Ashley A. Woods, ISBN 9781779520449)
- Nubia and the Amazons (with Vita Ayala, 2021–2022, illustrated by Alitha Martinez, ISBN 9781779516671)
- Trial of the Amazons #1–2 (with Vita Ayala, Becky Cloonan, Michael W. Conrad, Jordie Bellaire, and Joëlle Jones, illustrated by Joëlle Jones, Elena Casagrande, Skylar Patridge, and Laura Braga, 2022, UPC 76194137524300111, 76194137524300211)
- Nubia: Coronation Special #1 (with Vita Ayala, 2022, illustrated by Marguerite Sauvage, Colleen Doran, Darryl Banks, Jill Thompson, and Alitha Martinez. UPC 76194137527400111)
- DC Pride 2022 ("Confessions", illustrated by Meghan Hetrick, 2022, UPC 76194137652300111)
- Nubia: Queen of the Amazons (illustrated by Alitha Martinez, 2022, ISBN 9781779516961)
- DC Power: A Celebration #1 ("The Queen, the Bee & the Symphony", 2023, illustrated by Alitha Martinez, 2023, UPC 76194137914200111)
- Warriors and a Wee Wonder (webcomic for DC GO!, 2025)
- Warriors and a Tween Wonder (webcomic for DC GO!, 2026)
- Wonder Woman #29–30 (fill-in for Tom King, illustrated by Jeff Spokes, 2026, UPC 76194138162602911, 76194138162603011)
- Wonder Woman #35–36 (fill-in for Tom King, illustrated by Clayton Henry, 2026, UPC 76194138162603511, 76194138162603611)
- Wonder Woman Annual: Wonder War – The Matriarch #1 (with Leah Williams, illustrated by Eduardo Pansica and Belén Ortega, UPC 76194139691000111)

=== Marvel ===
- Marvel's Voices: Legacy ("Panic at the Supermarket", illustrated by Natacha Bustos, 2021, UPC 75960609828600111)
- Wakanda #1 (illustrated by Paco Medina, 2022, UPC 75960620365900111)
- Marvel's Voices: Pride ("What May Bloom", illustrated by Héctor Barros, 2023, UPC 75960620608700111)
- Alien: Black, White & Blood #2 (2024, UPC 75960620775600211)

=== IDW Publishing ===
- My Little Pony: Maretime Mysteries (illustrated by Abby Bulmer, 2024, ISBN 9798887241715)
- Street Sharks (illustrated by Ariel Medel, 2025, ISBN 9798887245065)
- Star Trek: Deviations – Threads of Destiny #1 (illustrated by Greg Maldonado, 2026, UPC 82771403505600111)

=== Penguin Random House ===
- The Raven Boys (adaption of the novel by Maggie Stiefvater, 2025, illustrated by Sas Milledge, ISBN 9780593621172)

=== Mad Cave Studios ===
- Temporal (illustrated by Asiah Fulmore, 2025, ISBN 9781545823897)

=== Ignition Press ===
- Roots of Madness (illustrated by Letizia Cadonici, 2025, ISBN 9781968063108)

=== Oni Press ===
- Sesame Street #2 (illustrated by Beth Hughes, 2025, ISBN 9781637156780)

=== Scholastic ===
- Moon Girl and Devil Dinosaur: Wreck and Roll (illustrated by Asia Simone, 2024, ISBN 9781338785524)
