= Nubia & the Amazons =

2021 DC Comics limited series

Publication information
- Publisher: DC Comics
- No. of issues: 6

Creative team
- Written by: Stephanie Williams and Vita Ayala
- Artist(s): Alitha Martinez and Mark Morales

Nubia and the Amazons (also spelled as Nubia & the Amazons) is a 2021 six-issue Wonder Woman comic book series written by Stephanie Williams and Vita Ayala and illustrated Alitha Martinez and Mark Morales. The series focuses on Nubia as she adapts to being the new queen of the Amazons.

== Plot ==
Following the Infinite Frontier storyline, Nubia has assumed the role the queen of Themyscira. As she adapts to her new role, the Well of Souls, where human women killed in the world of men are reborn as Amazons and where Nubia herself once emerged, opens up after having long been sealed away.

Medusa acts as an antagonist in the series.

The sixth and final issue of the comic is the second part of the Trial of the Amazons crossover event.

== Collected edition ==
Title	Material collected	Pages	Published date	ISBN
Nubia & the Amazons	Nubia & the Amazons #1-6; and pages from Infinite Frontier #0	160	11/28/23	978-1779520555

== Reception ==
According to Comic Book Roundup, a review aggregator website, the series has a cumulative rating of 8.5 out of 10 across all six issues from 55 critical reviews.

The series was included in the 2022 Best Graphic Novels for Adults by the Graphic Novels & Comics Round Table.

The series gained attention from numerous outlets for the introduction of Bia, an Amazon resurrected by the Well of Souls in the first issue. While left unconfirmed in the issue, both authors later specified on social media that Bia was a trans woman, making her the first confirmed transgender Amazon in DC Comics.
