= Trial of the Amazons =

Comic book storyline

- Publisher: DC Comics
- Publication date: April – March 2022
- Genre: Superhero; Mythology
Title(s)
Batman (vol. 3) #95–100
Nightwing (vol. 4) #70–73
- Main character(s): Wonder Woman; Nubia; Yara Flor; Artemis of Bana-Mighdall; Donna Troy; Wonder Girl; Hippolyta

Creative team
- Writer(s): Jordie Bellaire, Vita Ayala, Joëlle Jones, Stephanie WIlliams
- Artist: Joëlle Jones
- Penciller(s): Joëlle Jones, Elena Casagrande, Skylar Patridge
- Editor: Marie Javins

"Trial of the Amazons" is a seven issue crossover event from DC Comics written by Becky Cloonan, Michael W. Conrad, Jordie Bellaire, Vita Ayala, Joelle Jones, and Stephanie Williams. The story details a civil war between the Amazons, and has Wonder Woman crossing paths with Nubia, Yara Flor, Cassie Sandsmark, Donna Troy, Hippolyta and Artemis of Bana-Mighdall. The event received positive reviews, although the ending received criticism for it being rushed.

== Publication history ==
DC Comics announced in October 2021 that it will have its first Wonder Woman comic book event since 1992 called "Trial of the Amazons" where Wonder Woman must bend the relationships between different Amazon tribes or else there will be a civil war.

== Plot summary ==
=== Prelude ===
After the events of Dark Nights: Death Metal where Wonder Woman sacrificed herself to defeat The Batman Who Laughs, she is transported to Asgard where she travels throughout dimensions to get back to Earth. On the way to Earth, she meets Greek Gods where she overhears that there is a civil war between Amazons. Yara Flor (an Amazon with ties to Brazilian) is traveling to Brazil when the Greek Gods, Amazons from Bana-Mighdall, and Diana's tribe all feel threatened by Yara for mysterious reasons and everyone targets Yara. Artemis of Bana-Mighdall and Wonder Girl go try to find Yara Flor, but are interrupted by Brazilian Amazons. Eros takes down the plane Yara was at, but accidentally nicks himself with the arrow and falls in love with Yara.

Eros takes Yara to Mt. Olympus where Yara meets Hera, who plans to have Yara marry Eros and become a god-like being. Artemis and Wonder Girl defeat the Brazilian Amazons and go to their headquarters. Yara meets a Brazilian Amazon named Potira who reveals that the Gods created a tribe of powerful warriors, however they were defeated by the darkness and after regaining their humanity they were split in half: The Amazons and the Bana-Mighdall. An Amazon name Aella broke free from both tribes and fell in love with a human, but was separated and landed in Brazil where she met a female Brazilian warrior tribe and gave birth to Yara, however the Greek Gods killed Aela as punishment for deserting the Amazons tribes. Artemis and Wonder Girl arrive, and tell Yara that if she allies with Hera then there will be a path of destruction that the Amazons can't stop.

The next day, Yara Flor refuses to drink the elixir of immortality, and escapes Mt. Olympus. Wonder Girl meets Potira, where they travel to the Brazilian Amaon's headquarters called Akahim and plan to invade Themiscyra as punishment for taking Yara Flor against her will, and Wonder Girl meets Donna Troy. Hephaestus arrives and sends Yara to Tartarus. but Yara escapes and arrives at Mt. Olympus the same time her Brazilian allies plan to attack. Yara Flor is attacked by Greek Gods, and realizes that one of them is Eros who killed her mother so that he can be with her. Yara Flor opens the gates of Mt. Olympus, and Donna Troy, Wonder Girl, and the Brazilian allies help Yara fend off the Gods, and Wonder Girl calms Zeus down.

When Wonder Woman comes back to Earth, she is greeted warmly by Superman, Batman, Black Canary, Green Arrow, Hawkgirl, The Flash, Cyborg, Doctor Fate, and her mother Queen Hippolyta. When Wonder Woman saves a group of innocent civilians, the whole world hears her return and everyone is celebrating except Artemis and Yara Flor. After defeating a person name Attum, Wonder Woman receives a message saying that something is happening in Themiscyra, Wonder Woman flies off. Artemis introduces a new Amazon to her tribe, when she hears that they are under attack by a creature. After defeating the creature, Artemis realizes that creature came from Themyscira. The Bana-Mighdall believe Yara is responsible, but Artemis defends Yara. Faruka (a Bana-Mighdall) wants to take down Themiscyra so the rest of the tribe can have immortality and win back Themyscira. Artemis meets up with Hippolyta, Atalanta, and Antiope and pledges her oath to them to help unite the Amazons against an evil enemy known as Chaos. It is revealed that Nubia accidentally opened a magic portal called Doom's Doorway while fighting Medusa that draws attention to the three Amazons tribes as Queen Hippolyta arrives to ask where is Nubia.

=== Main plot ===
Queen Hippolyta, Bia and Nubia talk about foreshadowing dreams of Penelope (an Amazon) who sees the island burning in flames and think it is in regards to Yara Flor and the return of Diana Prince. The Amazons decide to concentrate on celebrating Diana Prince's return, and Faruka, Atalanta and Artemis enter the Amazon's Embassy to go to Themiscyra to participate in the contest to see who would guard the Doom Doorway. Yara Flor and Diana Prince arrive, and Diana and Faruka get in a heated argument but leave for dinner. During the feast, Faruka adds that she wants the contest to also include the right for the Queen to rule all the Amazons. Hippolyta and Phillippus meet to talk about what happened, and they kissed. However, the next day Nubia finds that Hippolyta has been murdered by a poisonous drink.

All of the Amazons mourn Hippolyta's death, and the champions debate if the contest should be canceled. Nubia's tribe nearly gets in a fight with the Bana-Mighdall tribe, while Medusa reveals that Apeiron keeps on calling to her from the Doom Doorway. Diana Prince arrives and tells Nubia she will use her Lasso of Truth to find Hippolyta's killer.

Yarima, Rhea, and Io are guarding the Doom Doorway when they are killed by mysterious forces. Wonder Woman gathers Cassie Sandsmark, Yara Flor, Artemis of Bana-Mighdall, Donna Troy, and Nubia to find the killer of Queen Hippolyta, but Nubia tells Wonder Woman that the investigation will have to be delayed in order to evade tensions. While praying to the Gods, Wonder Woman sees a mysterious stranger, but the stranger disappears after taunting Wonder Woman. Donna Troy pledges her allegiance to Faruka, while the rest of the contestants are waiting for the Contest to start. Wonder Woman arrives and tells everyone that she will participate in the tournament, but she belongs to no tribe. Yara Flor is reminiscing her lost memories of her mother and her recent bond with Queen Hippolyta, while Cassie Sandmarks is trying to find the murderer of Queen Hippolyta but is threatened by Artemis of Bana-Mighdall when she accuses Artemis, in which Cassie grew more suspicious about Artemis's behavior. While Diana, Yara, Donna Troy, and Phillipus prepare for the contest, Altuum frees monsters which disrupt the contest and drive the audience angry. After they survived their fall, the contestants wander into the mysterious catacombs until they encounter a monster name Echidna and push Echnida to the Doom's Doorway where Diana Prince realizes that a being named Chaos has come to Themiscyra. As the catacombs began to collapse, Donna, Yara, and Philipus quickly escape while Diana was left buried in the rubble before telling them to warn Nubia about Chaos. Having fed up with delays and rising tensions, Cassie Sandmarks steps in and reveals to the leaders that the murderer, who poisoned Hippolyta, snuck into the hallway and secretly drop the poison on Hippolyta's chalice during the altercation caused by Atalanta, Faruka, and Yara Flur. As Cassie investigates the poison that killed Hippolyta, she discovered that it originates from Esquicidas' homeland from Brazil, Akahim, after she recognized the scent during her visit with Esquecidas, during which she was warned about the threat of the poison's aroma. Cassie deduces that Artemis of Bana Mighdall illegally took the poison and murders Queen Hippolyta, which Nubia arrests her. Because of the oath, she swore to Hippolyta, Artemis refuses to explain why she did it. Wonder Woman pushes herself out of the rubble in relief and arrives at the same time as Donna, Yara, and Philipus before the Doom Doorway opens. Cassie Sandmarks asks Artemis for help as Wonder Woman and the rest of the Amazons try to defeat Chaos, who revealed himself as Aperion. After tricking chaos into receiving the gift of entropy, Atalanta and Antiope sacrifice themselves to seal Chaos away and guard Doom Doorway to prevent Chaos from being freed. Wonder Woman tells Yara Flor that she is worthy to be Wonder Girl, and all the Amazons decide to unite and work together to stop future threats while Artemis is left in self-imposed exile. For honoring Atalanta's sacrifice, Faruka acknowledges Nubia as a rightful leader and Nubia reconcile Faruka for her nobility.

=== Aftermath ===
With the trial ended and Themyscira recovered, the Amazons of three tribes have finally found peace with Diana still grieving her mother's death. Diana manages to track Atluum, having lost contact with Chaos. Using the lasso of truth on him, she learned that Atluum is the last survivor of countless souls sent to Themyscira to eradicate all monsters. Having shown resentment towards the Amazons for their gods' approval, the souls returned to Tartarus leaving Altuum alone and manipulated by Chaos to incite war against the Amazon tribes. Diana offers Atluum to escape the sunken ship but he declined and chose to accept his fate rather than accept his false fantasy out of shame. Hippolyta revealed to Diana that she instructed Artemis to poison her to help unite the tribes and ascended to Olympus for Amazon's support. She also informed Diana that the Olympus gods still fear her for many reasons.

== Reading order ==
- Trial of the Amazons #1 (Part 1)
- Nubia and the Amazons #6 (Part 2)
- Wonder Woman #785 (Part 3)
- Trial of the Amazons: Wonder Girl #1 (Part 4)
- Wonder Woman #786 (Part 5)
- Trial of the Amazons: Wonder Girl #2 (Part 6)
- Trial of the Amazons #2 (Final Part)

== Collected edition ==
Title	Material collected	Published date	ISBN
Trial of the Amazons	Wonder Woman #785-786, Nubia and the Amazons #6, Trial of the Amazons #1-2, Trial of the Amazons: Wonder Girl #1-2	October 2022	978-1779516824

== Critical reception ==
According to Comic Book Roundup, Trials of the Amazon #1 received an average score of 8 out of 10 based on 15 reviews.

According to Comic Book Roundup, Nubia and the Amazons #6 received an average score of 8.6 out of 10 based on 6 reviews.

According to Comic Book Roundup, Wonder Woman #785 received an average rating of 8.5 out of 10 based on 5 reviews.

According to Comic Book Roundup, Trial of the Amazon: Wonder Girl #1 received an average score of 8.4 out of 10 based on 10 reviews.

According to Comic Book Roundup, Wonder Woman #786 received an average score of 7.8 out of 10 based on 8 reviews.

According to Comic Book Roundup, Trial of the Amazon: Wonder Girl #2 received an average score of 7.4 out of 10 based on 10 reviews.

According to Comic Book Roundup, Trials of the Amazon #2 received an average score of 6.6 out of 10 based on 9 reviews.
