= John Kalisz =

American comics artist

- Born: 8 May 1969 (age 56)
- Occupation: Comics creator/artist

John Kalisz is an American comics artist who has worked as a colorist in the comics industry. He has been recognized for his work with nominations for the Comics Buyer's Guide Favorite Colorist Award in 2001, 2002, 2003, and 2004.

In August 1997, Kalisz worked on the official film adaptation comic of Steel, which was released by DC Entertainment/Warner Bros. Shaquille O'Neal starred as Steel in the film.
