= Wonder Woman (comic book) =

Comic book series

- Cover of Wonder Woman #1 (summer 1942), art by Harry G. Peter

Publication information
- Publisher: DC Comics
- Format: Ongoing series
- Genre: Superhero
- Publication date: List: (vol. 1): Summer 1942 – February 1986 (vol. 2): February 1987 – April 2006 (vol. 3): August 2006 – October 2011 (vol. 4): November 2011 – July 2016 (vol. 5): August 2016 – December 2019 (vol. 1 resumed): January 2020 – June 2023 (vol. 6): September 2023 – present
- No. of issues: List: (vol. 1): 329 (vol. 2): 228 (#1–226. plus issues numbered #0 and 1,000,000) and 8 Annuals (vol. 3): 60 and 1 Annual (vol. 4): 55 (#1–52, plus issues numbered #0 and 23.1-23.2) and 1 Annual (vol. 5): 83 + 4 Annuals + a DC Rebirth one-shot issue (vol. 1 resumed): 51 + 1 "Annual" (vol. 6): 37
- Main character: List: Diana Prince Queen Hippolyta Hercules Donna Troy Steve Trevor

Creative team
- Created by: William Moulton Marston; Harry G. Peter; Elizabeth Holloway Marston
- Written by: List: (vol. 1) William Moulton Marston (1-11, 21-30), Joye Hummel (12-20), Robert Kanigher (30-176, 204-205, 207-211, 286), Bill Finger (177), Dennis O'Neil (178–181, 199–201), Mike Sekowsky (178-196), Samuel R. Delany (202-203), Cary Bates (206, 213, 215), Len Wein (212), Elliot S. Maggin (214, 216–217, 225), Martin Pasko (218–224, 226–232), Gerry Conway (233-241, 259-285, 329), Jack C. Harris (242-254), Paul Levitz (255-258, Huntress: 271-287, 289-296), Marv Wolfman (287, 294), Roy Thomas (288-296, 300), Dan Mishkin (295-299, 301-317, 319-325), Kurt Busiek (318) Mindy Newell (326-328) (vol. 2) George Pérez (1-62, 169, Annual #1 and #2), Len Wein (3-16), Mindy Newell (36-46), William Messner-Loebs (0, 63-64, 66-87, 90-100, Annual #3), Joey Cavalieri (65), Christopher Priest (88-89, 137-138, 1,000,000), Kate Worley (Annual #4), John Byrne (101-136, Annual #5 and #6), Eric Luke (139-159, Annual #7), Doselle Young (Annual #8), Brian K. Vaughan (160-161), Ben Raab (162-163), Phil Jimenez (164-168, 170-188), Walter Simonson (189-194), Greg Rucka (195-226) (vol. 3) Allan Heinberg (1-4, Annual #1), Jodi Picoult (6-10), J. Torres (11-13), Gail Simone (14-44, 600), J. Michael Straczynski (600-614) (vol. 4) Brian Azzarello (0-35, 23.2) John Ostrander (23.1) Meredith Finch (36-52, Annual #1) (vol. 5) Greg Rucka (1-25), Shea Fontana (26-30), James Robinson (31-50), Steve Orlando (51-55, 73, 82-83, 750-758), James Tynion IV (56-57), G. Willow Wilson (58-72, 74-81)' (vol. 1 resumed) Mariko Tamaki (759-769), Becky Cloonan & Michael W. Conrad (770-800), Jordie Bellaire (770-779, 785-798, 800), Vita Ayala (781-784)' (vol. 6) Tom King (1-28, 31-34, 37-), Stephanie Williams (29-30, 35-36)
- Penciller: List: (vol. 1) Harry G. Peter (1-97), Ross Andru, Mike Sekowsky (178-198), Don Heck (199, 204-206, 233-234, 287, 301, 306-309, 311-317, 319-329), Ric Estrada, Curt Swan (212, 214, 219, 221, 224, 297), Irv Novick, John Rosenberger, José Delbo (222-223, 225-230, 235-240, 242-261, 263-286), Gene Colan (288-305) (vol. 2): George Pérez, Chris Marrinan, Colleen Doran, Jill Thompson Paris Cullins, Mike Deodato (0, 85, 90-100), John Byrne (101-136), Phil Jimenez, Jerry Ordway, Drew Johnson (vol. 3) Terry Dodson Aaron Lopresti Nicola Scott Don Kramer Eduardo Pansica (vol. 4) Cliff Chiang David Finch (vol. 5) Liam Sharp Nicola Scott Bilquis Evely Mirka Andolfo David Messina Carlo Pagulayan Emanuela Lupacchino Stephen Segovia Jesus Merino ACO Raul Allen Cary Nord Xermanico Max Raynor Mikel Janin Carlo Barberi Steve Pugh Rafa Sandoval Travis Moore Paulina Ganucheau Marcio Takara Skylar Patridge (vol. 6) Daniel Sampere (1-28, 31-34, 37-) Jeff Spokes (29-30) Clayton Henry (35-36)
- Inker: List: (vol. 1) Mike Esposito Dick Giordano Vince Colletta Joe Giella (vol. 2) Bruce Patterson Romeo Tanghal P. Craig Russell Ray Snyder Bob McLeod (vol. 3) Rachel Dodson Matt Ryan Wayne Faucher (vol. 4) Scott Hanna (vol. 5)

Wonder Woman is an ongoing American comic book series featuring the DC Comics superhero Wonder Woman and occasionally other superheroes as its protagonist. The character first appeared in All Star Comics #8 (cover dated December 1941), later featured in Sensation Comics (January 1942) series and gaining her own solo title shortly after.

The series contained many volume revamps and new writers through the ages. Events within the DC Universe tended to affect the series' storylines, including several reboots such as Crisis on Infinite Earths and The New 52.

The series was given a relaunch in 2016, when DC Comics rebooted its entire line of titles in an event called DC Rebirth. The series received a revamp in 2021, as part of a line-wide relaunch called Infinite Frontier, with issue #770. The series relaunched in 2023 as a part of Dawn of DC.

== Volume 1 ==
=== Golden Age ===
Wonder Woman first appeared in All Star Comics #8 (December 1941), during the era known to comics historians as the "Golden Age of Comic Books". Following this debut, she was featured in Sensation Comics #1 (January 1942), until starting in her own series in Summer 1942.

During 1942 to 1947, images of bound and gagged women frequently graced the covers of both Sensation Comics and Wonder Woman. An early example is a scene in Wonder Woman #3 (Feb.-March 1943) in which Wonder Woman herself ties up several women, dresses them in deer costumes and chases them through the forest. Later, she rebinds them and displays them on a platter.

A variety of Wonder Woman enemies debuted in the comic series. Issue #1 introduced Wonder Woman's nemesis, Ares, as the embodiment of all abnormal emotions, evil, and essentially all that Wonder Woman was against. In issue #5, the character of Doctor Psycho, a murderous psychopath with an intense hatred of women, was debuted, Issue #6 introduced the Cheetah while issue #9 introduced Giganta. Also issue #9 debuted Queen Clea, which would later help form the female supervillain team Villainy Inc. Later on, issue #49 debuted another recurring enemy, Circe.

=== Silver Age ===
Wonder Woman experienced significant changes from the late 1950s through the 1960s during the Silver Age of Comic Books. Harry G. Peter was replaced by Ross Andru and Mike Esposito in issue #98 (May 1958), and the character was revamped as were other characters in the Silver Age. In Diana's new origin story (issue #105), it is revealed that her powers are gifts from the gods. Receiving the blessing of each deity in her crib, Diana is destined to become as "beautiful as Aphrodite, wise as Athena, stronger than Hercules, and swifter than Mercury". Further changes included the removal of all World War II references from Wonder Woman's origin, the changing of Hippolyta's hair color to blonde, Wonder Woman's new ability to glide on air currents, and the introduction of the rule that Paradise Island would be destroyed if a man ever set foot on it.

In the 1960s, regular scripter Robert Kanigher adapted several gimmicks which had been used for Superman. As with Superboy, Wonder Woman's "untold" career as the teenage Wonder Girl was chronicled. Foils of Wonder Woman in the Robert Kanigher run included the Angle Man.

=== The Diana Prince era and the Bronze Age ===
Wonder Woman #189 (August 1970): By this era, Wonder Woman had more in common with Emma Peel than superheroes. Cover art by Mike Sekowsky and Dick Giordano.

In 1968, under the guidance of scripter Denny O'Neil and editor/plotter/artist Mike Sekowsky, Wonder Woman surrendered her powers to remain in "Man's World" rather than accompany her fellow Amazons to another dimension where they could "restore their magic" (part of her motivation was to assist Steve Trevor, who was facing criminal charges).

Now a mod boutique owner, the powerless Diana Prince acquired a Chinese mentor named I Ching. Under I Ching's guidance, Diana learned martial arts and weapons skills, and engaged in adventures that encompassed a variety of genres, from espionage to mythology. During this time she fought villains such as the Catwoman, Doctor Cyber, the hippie gang Them!, and the campy witch Morgana.

This new era of the comic book was influenced by the British television series The Avengers, with Wonder Woman in the role of Emma Peel. With Diana Prince running a boutique, fighting crime, and acting in concert with private detective allies Tim Trench and Jonny Double, the character resembled the Golden Age Black Canary. Soon after the launch of the "new" Wonder Woman, the editors severed all connections to her old life, most notably by killing Steve Trevor.

During the 25 bi-monthly issues of the "new" Wonder Woman, the writing team changed four times. Consequently, the stories display abrupt shifts in setting, theme, and tone. The revised series attracted writers not normally associated with comic books, most notably science fiction author Samuel R. Delany, who wrote Wonder Woman #202–203 (October and December 1972).

The I Ching era had an influence on the 1974 Wonder Woman TV movie featuring Cathy Lee Crosby, in which Wonder Woman was portrayed as a non-superpowered globe-trotting super-spy who wore an amalgam of the Wonder Woman and Diana Prince costumes. The first two issues of Allan Heinberg's run (Wonder Woman (vol. 3) #1–2) include direct references to I Ching, and feature Diana wearing an outfit similar to that which she wore during the I Ching era.

Wonder Woman's powers and traditional costume were restored in issue #204 (January–February 1973). Gloria Steinem, who grew up reading Wonder Woman comics, was a key player in the restoration. Steinem, offended that the most famous female superheroine had been depowered, placed Wonder Woman (in costume) on the cover of the first issue of Ms. (1972) – Warner Communications, DC Comics' owner, was an investor – which also contained an appreciative essay about the character.

The return of the "original" Wonder Woman was executed by Robert Kanigher, who returned as the title's writer-editor. For the first year, he relied upon rewritten and redrawn stories from the Golden Age.

Following the popularity of the Wonder Woman TV series (initially set during World War II), the comic book was also transposed to this era. The change was made possible by the multiverse concept, which maintained that the 1970s Wonder Woman and the original 1940s version existed in two separate yet parallel Earths. A few months after the TV series changed its setting to the 1970s, the comic book returned to the contemporary timeline. Soon after, when the series was written by Jack C. Harris, Steve (Howard) Trevor was killed off yet again.

Writer Gerry Conway brought Steve Trevor back to life again in issue #271 (September 1980). Following Diana's renunciation of her role as Wonder Woman, a version of Steve Trevor from an undisclosed portion of the Multiverse accidentally made the transition to Earth-One. With Diana's memory erased by the Mists of Nepenthe, the new Steve again crash-landed and arrived at Paradise Island. After reclaiming the title of Wonder Woman, Diana returned to Military Intelligence, working with Trevor and re-joined by supporting characters Etta Candy and General Darnell.

In the preview in DC Comics Presents #41 (January 1982), writer Roy Thomas and penciler Gene Colan provided Wonder Woman with a stylized "WW" emblem on her bodice, replacing the traditional eagle. The "WW" emblem, unlike the eagle, could be protected as a trademark and therefore had greater merchandising potential. Wonder Woman #288 (February 1982) premiered the new costume and an altered cover banner incorporating the "WW" emblem. The new emblem was the creation of Milton Glaser, who also designed the "bullet" logo adopted by DC in 1977, and the cover banner was originally made by studio letterer Todd Klein, which lasted for a year and a half before being replaced by a version from Glaser's studio. Dann Thomas co-wrote Wonder Woman #300 (Feb. 1983) and, as Roy Thomas noted in 1999 "became the first woman ever to receive scripting credit on the world's foremost super-heroine."

After the departure of Thomas in 1983, Dan Mishkin took over the writing. Mishkin and Colan reintroduced the character Circe to the rogues gallery of Wonder Woman's adversaries. Don Heck replaced Colan as artist as of issue #306 (Aug. 1983) but sales of the title continued to decline. Shortly after Mishkin's departure in 1985 – including a three-issue run by Mindy Newell and a never-published revamp by Steve Gerber - the series ended with issue #329 (Feb. 1986). Written by Gerry Conway, the final issue depicted Wonder Woman's marriage to Steve Trevor.

=== Huntress series ===
Despite the name title, Wonder Woman was not the only character featured in volume 1 of the series. Beginning with issue #271 (September 1980), the character Huntress (Helena Wayne) appeared in her own solo series as a backup feature in issues of Wonder Woman.

== Volume 2 ==
Wonder Woman (vol. 2) #1 (February 1987), art by George Pérez

Following Crisis on Infinite Earths, Wonder Woman was rebooted in 1987, by writer Greg Potter, who previously created the Jemm, Son of Saturn series for DC, was hired to rework the character. He spent several months working with editor Janice Race on new concepts, before being joined by writer/artist George Pérez. Inspired by John Byrne and Frank Miller's work on refashioning Superman and Batman, Pérez came in as the plotter and penciler of Wonder Woman. Potter dropped out of writing the series after issue #2, and Pérez became the sole plotter. Initially, Len Wein replaced Potter but Pérez took on the scripting as of issue #17. Mindy Newell returned to the title as scripter with issue #36 (November 1989). Pérez produced 62 issues of the rebooted title. His relaunch of the character was a critical and sales success.

Pérez and Potter wrote Wonder Woman as a feminist character, and Pérez's research into Greek mythology provided Wonder Woman's world with depth and verisimilitude missing from her previous incarnation. The incorporation of Greek gods and sharply characterized villains added a richness to Wonder Woman's Amazon heritage and set her apart from other DC heroes.

Wonder Woman was a princess and emissary from Paradise Island (now called Themyscira) to Patriarch's World. She was described as possessing stunning beauty and a loving heart, gifts from the goddess Aphrodite. From Athena, she received the gift of great wisdom; from Demeter, the power and strength of the earth; from Hestia, sisterhood with fire; and from Artemis, unity with beasts and the instincts and prowess of a hunter. Finally, Diana received the gift of speed and the power of flight from the god Hermes.

The American theme of Diana's costume was explained by Pérez in the Challenge of the Gods storyline in which Diana engaged in a series of trials arranged by Zeus as punishment for refusing his advances. Diana met the spirit of Steve Trevor's mother, Diana Trevor, who was clad in armor identical to her own. Trevor revealed that during World War II she had crashed on Themyscira while on duty as a U.S. Army pilot. She blundered into an Amazon battle against Cottus, a multi-armed demon, at the portal to the underworld. Trevor was drawn into the battle, although she was armed only with her side arm. She wounded the beast before suffering a mortal blow, allowing the Amazons to reseal the portal.

Impressed by this unknown woman's self-sacrifice, the Amazons entombed her with honors and clothed her in armor displaying the American flag pattern on her uniform, which they assumed were her heraldic colors. Trevor's legacy was also the primary reason why Ares arranged for Steve Trevor to bomb the island, as he could not resist the irony of the heroine's son unwittingly killing her admirers.

Wonder Woman did not keep her identity a secret, and initially did not consider herself a superheroine. Indeed, her character was wide-eyed and naive, innocent and without guile. Diana spoke only Themyscirian, a variation of ancient Greek, and had to learn English when she arrived in the United States. Fortunately, Diana soon met Julia Kapatelis, a scholar in Greek culture, and her daughter Vanessa Kapatelis who helped the Amazon princess adjust to the world of men. However, for all her apparent naiveté, Diana was a trained warrior, and had no compunction against using deadly force when it was called for. For example, she felled the god Deimos in battle and felt completely justified under the circumstances. Through Pérez's tenure on the book, Diana confronted war, injustice, inequality, death and conflicts involving the Olympian Gods.

Wonder Woman's supporting characters were altered as well. In addition to the introduction of the Kapatelises, Steve Trevor was changed into an Air Force officer considerably older than Diana, thus sidestepping the traditional romance between the two. Instead, Trevor became involved with Etta Candy, a mature military officer possessing a plump physique. The Greek war god Ares and the witch Circe eventually became two of Diana's greatest enemies. Her rogues gallery included the Cheetah, a woman who could transform into a ferocious feline-humanoid creature; and the Silver Swan, a once-deformed radiation victim granted beauty, wings and deafening sonic powers through genetic engineering.

Following Pérez, William Messner-Loebs took over as writer and Mike Deodato became the artist for the title. Messner-Loebs introduced Diana's Daxamite friend Julia in Wonder Woman vol. 2 #68 during the six-issue space arc. Messner-Loebs's most memorable contribution to the title was the introduction of the red-headed Amazon Artemis, who took over the mantle of Wonder Woman for a short time. He also included a subplot during his run in an attempt to further humanize Diana by having her work for a fictional fast food chain called "Taco Whiz".

John Byrne's run included a period in which Diana's mother Hippolyta served as Wonder Woman, having traveled back to the 1940s, while Diana ascended to Mount Olympus as the Goddess of Truth after being killed in issue #124. In addition, Wonder Woman's Amazon ally Nubia was re-introduced as Nu'Bia, scripted by a different author. Byrne posited that Hippolyta had been the Golden Age Wonder Woman. Byrne restored the series' status quo in his last issue.

Writer Eric Luke next joined the comic and depicted Diana as often questioning her mission in Man's World, and most primarily her reason for existing. His most memorable contributions to the title was having Diana separate herself from humanity by residing in a floating palace called the Wonder Dome, and for a godly battle between the Titan Cronus and the various religious pantheons of the world. Phil Jimenez, worked on the title beginning with issue #164 (January 2001), and produced a run which has been likened to Pérez's, particularly since his art bears a resemblance to Pérez's. Jimenez's run showed Wonder Woman as a diplomat, scientist, and activist who worked to help women across the globe become more self-sufficient. Jimenez also added many visual elements found in the Wonder Woman television series. One of Jimenez's story arcs is "The Witch and the Warrior", in which Circe turns New York City's men into beasts, women against men, and lovers against lovers.

After Jimenez, Walt Simonson wrote a six-issue homage to the I Ching era, in which Diana temporarily loses her powers and adopts an all-white costume (Wonder Woman (vol. 2) #189–194). Greg Rucka became writer with issue #195. His initial story arc centered upon Diana's authorship of a controversial book and included a political subtext. Rucka introduced a new recurring villain, ruthless businesswoman Veronica Cale, who uses media manipulation to try to discredit Diana. Rucka modernized the Greek and Egyptian gods, updating the toga-wearing deities to provide them with briefcases, laptop computers, designer clothing, and modern hairstyles. Rucka dethroned Zeus and Hades, who were unable to move with the times as the other gods had, replacing them with Athena and Ares as the new rulers of the gods and the Underworld. Athena selected Diana to be her personal champion.

== Volume 3 ==
In conjunction with DC's "One Year Later" crossover storyline, Wonder Woman (vol. 3) was launched with a new issue #1 (June 2006), written by Allan Heinberg with art by Terry Dodson. Her bustier features a new design, combining the traditional eagle with the 1980s "WW" design, similar to her emblem in the Kingdom Come miniseries.

Donna Troy has taken up the mantle of Wonder Woman; Diana has disappeared to parts unknown, though there are reports that she has been seen in the company of an eastern mystic named I Ching. The World Court drops the charges against Diana for the killing of Maxwell Lord.

When Diana returns she takes on the persona of Diana Prince, now a secret agent and member of the Department of Metahuman Affairs. She is partnered with Nemesis and the two report to Sarge Steel. Her first assignment is to retrieve her sister Donna Troy, who has been kidnapped by several of her most persistent enemies; their powers have been augmented by Circe. After this is accomplished, Diana takes back the title of Wonder Woman.

In Wonder Woman Annual (vol. 3) #1 (2007), Circe gives Diana the "gift" of human transformation. When she becomes Diana Prince she transforms into a non-powered mortal. She is content, knowing that she can become Wonder Woman when she wishes and be a member of the human race as Diana Prince.

The relaunch was beset by scheduling problems as described by Grady Hendrix in his article, "Out for Justice" in The New York Sun. "By 2007 [Heinberg had] only delivered four issues...Ms. Picoult's five issues hemorrhaged readers...and Amazons Attack!, a miniseries commissioned to fill a hole in the book's publishing schedule caused by Mr. Heinberg's delays, was reviled by fans who decried it as an abomination." Picoult's interpretation received acclaim from critics, who would have liked to have seen the novelist given more time to work. Min Jin Lee of The Times stated, "By furnishing a 21st-century emotional characterization for a 20th-century creation, Picoult reveals the novelist's dextrous hand."

Gail Simone took up writing duties on the title beginning with issue #14.

=== Issue #600 and beyond ===
DC Comics Executive Editor Dan DiDio asked fans for 600 postcards to restore the Wonder Woman comic book to the original numbering, starting at #600. The publisher's office had received 712 postcards by the October 31, 2009, deadline. As a result, the numbering switched to #600 after Wonder Woman #44, in an anniversary issue. Issue #600 featured several stories featuring work from guest creators such as Geoff Johns, George Pérez, Phil Jimenez, and Amanda Conner. The issue featured guest appearances from other female superheroes such as Batwoman, Power Girl, Batgirl, Stargirl and the Question.

Writer J. Michael Straczynski took over the title after Gail Simone in issue #601. The art team was Don Kramer and Michael Babinski.

Straczynski's run focused on an alternate timeline created by the gods where Paradise Island was destroyed, leading to many Amazons being raised in the outside world. It revolves around Wonder Woman's attempts to restore the normal timeline, despite the fact that she does not remember it properly. Wonder Woman in this alternative timeline has been raised in New York City as an orphan and is coming into her powers. She is aware of the presence of Amazons, but does not remember her childhood on Paradise Island. Wonder Woman wore a new costume designed by DC Comics co-publisher Jim Lee. Writer Phil Hester continued the storyline.

The decision to redesign Wonder Woman received considerable coverage in mainstream news outlets.

The Wonder Woman in this timeline started off with a limited power set, but gained her magic lasso and the power of flight during the fourth installment of the story.

== Volume 4 ==
In August 2011, Wonder Woman (vol. 3) was cancelled along with every other DC title as part of a line-wide relaunch following Flashpoint. The series was relaunched in September with a new issue #1 written by Brian Azzarello and drawn by Cliff Chiang. Wonder Woman now sports another new costume, once again designed by Jim Lee. Azzarello describes the new Wonder Woman book as being darker than the past series, even going so far as to call it a "horror" book.

In this new continuity, Wonder Woman's origin is significantly changed and she is no longer a clay figure brought to life by the magic of the gods. Instead, she is the natural-born daughter of Hippolyta and Zeus. The earlier origin story was revealed by Hippolyta to be a ruse thought up by the Amazons, to protect Diana from the wrath of Hera, who is known for hunting and killing several illegitimate offspring of Zeus.

In the first story arc, Wonder Woman meets and protects a young woman named Zola, from Hera's wrath. Zola is pregnant with Zeus's child and Hera, seething with jealousy, intends to kill the child. The major event in this story is the revelation of Diana's true parentage. Long ago, Hippolyta and Zeus battled each other. Their battle ended with the couple making love and thus Diana was conceived. The first six issues of the New 52 series are collected in a hardcover titled Wonder Woman Vol. 1: Blood.

The second storyline focuses on Wonder Woman's quest to rescue Zola from Hades, who had abducted her and taken her to Hell at the end of the sixth issue of the series. The male Amazons are introduced and their origin story is revealed- the Amazons used to infrequently invade the ships coming near the island and force themselves on the sailors, and then kill them. After nine months, the birth of the female children are highly celebrated and inducted into the proper ranks of the Amazons, while the male children are rejected. In order to save the children from being killed by the Amazons, Hephaestus trades them with the Amazons in exchange for weapons.

The story then centers on Apollo trying to take over as King of Olympus due to his father Zeus' absence and Wonder Woman's efforts to protect Zola from him, as it is prophesied that one of Zeus' children will be his downfall, which Apollo considers to be Zola's child. Wonder Woman receives the power of flight by one of Hermes' feathers piercing her thigh and Zola's baby is stolen by Hermes at the end and given to Demeter. The issue's last page shows a dark and mysterious man rising from the snow, taking a helmet and disappearing. Issues 7–12 are collected in a hardcover titled Wonder Woman Vol. 2: Guts, scheduled for release in January 2013.

A stand-alone #0 Issue was released in September which explored Diana's childhood and her tutelage under Ares, the God of War. The issue was narrated in the style of a typical Golden Age comic book and saw Diana in her childhood years. The main plot of the issue was Diana training under Ares, as he thought of her being an extraordinary girl with immense potential. The issue ultimately concluded with Diana learning and experiencing the importance of mercy, as she hesitates and refuses to kill the Minotaur - a task given to her by Ares; however, this show of mercy makes her a failure in Ares' eyes.

Artist David Finch and writer Meredith Finch became the new creative team on the Wonder Woman series with issue #36 (Jan. 2015).

The series has been one of the most altered of the New 52 event. Joey Esposito and Erik Norris of IGN noted that the new creative team provided "a creative well that appears bottomless." Timothy Callahan of Comic Book Resources called the title "the best of the New 52" and described the work of Brian Azzarello and Cliff Chiang as "a clean, poetic story with a strong mythological pull."

== Volume 5 ==
As part of the DC Rebirth relaunch, writer Greg Rucka and artists Liam Sharp, Matthew Clark, and Nicola Scott launched a new Wonder Woman series in June 2016. This series reestablished elements of pre‑New 52 continuity, particularly regarding the origins of the Amazons and Themyscira, and featured a redesigned costume incorporating a pteruges-style skirt inspired by both Batman v Superman: Dawn of Justice and Rucka’s earlier run.

The series ran from issues #1 through #83. With issue 84, DC transitioned to legacy numbering: the series continued as issue #750, acknowledging Wonder Woman’s original Golden Age. Issue #750 was published as an oversized celebration issue, featuring multiple short stories by returning writers, including Gail Simone and Greg Rucka.

Beginning with issue #770, Wonder Woman became part of the 2021 Infinite Frontier initiative, introducing new creative teams—Becky Cloonan and Michael Conrad as writers, with Travis Moore as the initial artist—and continuing through issue #800 in June 2023.

During this period, an additional title, Sensational Wonder Woman, was published as a limited series in 2021. Originally a digital‑first initiative celebrating Wonder Woman’s 80th anniversary, the series was collected in print across seven issues. It featured standalone, accessible stories by a variety of creators—Stephanie Phillips and Meghan Hetrick kicked off the series with a storyline involving Doctor Psycho and Hawkgirl.

== Volume 6 ==
The Wonder Woman series relaunched in September 2023 as a part of the Dawn of DC initiative. The series is written by Tom King and drawn by Daniel Sampere. The story follows Diana as she seeks to continue her duties as Wonder Woman, even after a recent law has been passed that bans Amazons on American soil and the creation of the Amazon Extradition Entity (AXE) task force.

== See also ==
- Superman (comic book)
- Batman (comic book)
- Green Lantern (comic book)
- The Flash (comic book)
