= Wayne Faucher =

American comic book inker

Wayne Faucher is an American comic book inker. He is known mostly for his ink work on the Batman family of comics for DC Comics and for Spider-Man titles for Marvel Comics.

== Career ==
Raised in Rhode Island and a graduate of the Rhode Island School of Design, he worked for years as a graphic designer in New York City and Boston before setting his sights on working in comics. He started in the industry in 1995, with the DC Comics series Impulse. Since then, Faucher has worked on dozens of titles for a variety of publishers.

Pencillers with whom he is frequently paired include: Humberto Ramos, Alex Maleev, Mark Buckingham, Dick Giordano, Mike Deodato, Chad Hardin, Alberto Ponticelli and others.

== Selected works ==
=== DC Comics ===
- Arqueiro Verde e Canário Negro (2007)
- Impulse
- Batman: Shadow of the Bat
- Catwoman
- Detective Comics
- Wonder Woman
- Countdown
- Trinity
- Titans
- Legion
- Mr. Terrific
- Frankenstein Agent of S.H.A.D.E.
- Red Hood and the Outlaws

=== Marvel Comics ===
- Peter Parker: Spider-Man
- Nightcrawler
- The Spectacular Spider-Man
