= Nubia (DC Comics) =

Fictional character in DC Comics

- Nubia on the cover of Nubia & the Amazons #1 (October 2021), art by Alitha Martinez and Laura Martin.

Publication information
- Publisher: DC Comics
- First appearance: Wonder Woman #204 (January 1973)
- Created by: Robert Kanigher (writer), Don Heck (artist)

In-story information
- Species: Amazon
- Team affiliations: Justice League
- Abilities: Super strength, speed, agility, reflexes, senses, stamina, durability, and endurance; Superior hand-to-hand combatant; Magical weaponry, including a magical sword and armor; Paralyzing "Cold Sight"; Possesses the ability to open dimensional portals via lion armor; Possesses the ability to relieve her body of physical injury and toxins by becoming one with the Earth's soil and then reforming her body whole again; Immortality

Nubia is a fictional character appearing in DC Comics publications and related media, commonly as an ally of the superhero Wonder Woman. Historically, she is DC Comics' first black female superhero. Originally introduced in 1973 as Wonder Woman's long-lost fraternal twin sister, a former agent of Ares, and the ruler of Slaughter Island, a floating landmass. She is now presented as one of the hero's oldest and closest friends. Created by Robert Kanigher and Don Heck, Nubia debuted in 1973's Wonder Woman #204 and appeared intermittently throughout Wonder Woman's Bronze Age adventures.

In modern comic stories, Nubia is depicted as an Amazon contemporary of Wonder Woman and the successor to Wonder Woman's mother Hippolyta as queen of the Amazon nation of Themyscira. The character has developed an expanded profile and greater visibility in DC Comics' post-Rebirth continuity, including the limited series Nubia & the Amazons (2021), Trial of the Amazons (2022) and Nubia: Queen of the Amazons (2022). The publisher also commissioned young adult graphic novels featuring Nubia as the central character, including Nubia: Real One (2021) and Diana & Nubia: Princesses of the Amazons (2022).

Jayne Kennedy portrays Carolyn Hamilton in the television series Wonder Woman, who is retroactively revealed to be Nubia in Wonder Woman '77 Meets the Bionic Woman.

== Publication history ==
Nubia was created by Robert Kanigher and Don Heck in 1973. While Kanigher had previously written Wonder Woman for nine years, he had left to work on other projects. He and then-partner Heck created Nubia in his first issue back on Wonder Woman (#204 in January 1973), part of a one-year stint for the team.

== Fictional character biography ==
=== Nubia ===
Nubia is DC Comics' first Black superheroine and was introduced as a mysterious and stoic warrior with a helmet that concealed her identity. Someone incomparable in combat, she was the only one among all Amazons capable of rivaling Diana in power and even beauty. Originally, she was one of the royal twins of Themyscira, the daughter of Queen Hippolyta, older by a sigh, molded from darker clay just before Diana, making her, according to some accounts, the true heir to the Amazons. She could have also inherited the title of Wonder Woman, had it not been for her disappearance. Unlike her blessed sister, she was abducted and raised by Ares, the god of war. The girl was hidden from Aphrodite and the other gods; the stolen child, now called Nubia, was raised and trained by Mars in all forms of combat.

Ares (Mars) raised her far from Themyscira, surrounded by male figures, in a world of chaos and violence, training her from a young age to be his fiercest warrior. Since the moment she learned to walk, she was thrust into battle, quickly surpassing all her male peers. Ares treated her almost like an adopted daughter, preparing her to be his supreme champion in his war against the Amazons. As his only female apprentice, she quickly surpassed her male colleagues and even came to lead them. She was meticulously trained as a living weapon.

It was later revealed that, although she led Ares' armies, she never truly desired it. Despite being raised under his influence, Nubia retained the indomitable spirit of the Amazons, and Ares resorted to using a magical ring to bend her to his will through mind control to suppress her true nature, in order to make Nubia serve as the god of war's agent in the destruction of the Amazons, whose philosophy of love threatened his methods of war.

When Nubia reached adulthood, Mars named her ruler of a tribe of male warriors stationed on the Slaughter Island, a floating landmass wrapped in mist, with an "arsenal naturally capable of traveling anywhere in the world's oceans."

Nubia's first appearance in Wonder Woman (vol. 1) #204 (January 1973), art by Don Heck.

In Wonder Woman #204 (January 1973), Diana (Wonder Woman) has her memories restored by the Amazons after her mother, Hippolyta, brings her back to Paradise Island. In the previous issue, #203, Diana is living as Diana Prince and has given up her Amazon powers to live in "Man's World." Her memories of her life as an Amazon have faded, until flashbacks of her birth return — "as Hippolyta sculpts a tiny girl and Athena endows her with the powers of the gods." Issue #204 suggests that Diana is missing an important part of her origin story that was kept from her.

Diana regains her memory and reaffirms herself as Wonder Woman, but is soon interrupted by an armored woman who claims to be the "Wonder Woman of the Floating Islands." The masked warrior challenges Diana for the title of Wonder Woman, and Diana accepts the challenge. The mysterious woman and Diana are watched by the other Amazons from the stands of a coliseum as they face off in a series of games. The two fight on equal terms until, at a critical moment, the intruder disarms Diana, knocking the sword from her hands.

Nubia hesitates several times to kill Diana. As she looks at her, something triggers a subconscious recognition — something familiar, though she doesn't know what it is. She stops and reveals herself as Nubia. Feeling pity, she allows the fight to end in a draw, promising to return once Diana is ready to face her again. Declaring herself the "one true Wonder Woman," Nubia tells Diana that one day they will meet again to determine who truly deserves the title.

Diana's mother, Queen Hippolyta, secretly believes she recognizes Nubia and fears that Diana may be killed by her own blood sister — unless she reveals the secret that there were, in fact, two Wonder Women. Fortunately, Nubia hesitates and ultimately returns to her own Floating Island.

A short story about Nubia in Wonder Woman #205 begins with her departure from Paradise Island. It shows Queen Hippolyta following her, leading to a brief conversation and an embrace—though Hippolyta still doesn't reveal the truth, uncertain whether Nubia is truly her daughter. Later, Nubia is seen training her warriors before withdrawing to be alone. While she maintains the image of a strong and confident leader, it becomes evident that she is also a sensitive and introspective woman—someone who avoids showing weakness in front of others. Nubia begins to cry after Hippolyta's embrace. The story reveals that Nubia grows up feeling just as lonely as her twin sister. Back on her mist-concealed Floating Island, Nubia rules a community of all men. Upon her return, two men claim the right to fight for her, citing the "law of the Floating Island" or "Mars' law of conquest". Declaring "No man will ever own Nubia!" One of the men is defeated by the other, but before he can deliver the final blow, Nubia blocks the attack with her sword, preventing them from killing each other, and takes his place in the fight. Nubia accepts the challenge and disarms herself, removing her armor to fight on equal footing with the man. She then demands the right to choose her own champion—someone who can fight on equal ground and under the same conditions: herself. They fight, and the man underestimates Nubia, wondering how she expects to defeat a man. Nubia says, "A man? What is a man without a weapon?Just another ordinary man… Helpless as a babe…Waiting to be slaughtered!" She fights one of the men herself, defeating him but letting him live, even as he begs her to finish him. She says, "A woman doesn't destroy life! She cherishes it! She never forgets that once a life has been taken—it can never return! Until men turn from war to peace—and violence to love—They will always remain in a murderous jungle!”.

In Wonder Woman #206, Hippolyta recalls a revised version of Diana's origin: she had molded two babies from clay — one dark, one light. Both were granted life by the gods, but Mars, the god of war, abducted the dark-skinned child, Nubia, and raised her to become a weapon against the Amazons. From their base on the so-called “Slaughter Island,” Mars and Nubia launched an assault on Paradise Island. Mars had chosen Nubia because she was the only woman powerful enough to challenge — and possibly defeat — Diana.

Nubia wielded a magic sword capable of countering the effects of Diana's Lasso of Truth. After an intense battle between the sisters, Diana, recognizing Nubia's strength, chose a different approach. Noticing Mars' enchanted ring, she used sunlight reflected off her bracelets to heat and expand it, loosening it just enough to pull it from Nubia's finger. This act broke the war god's mind control, and Nubia regained her clarity. The two Amazons then confronted Mars, accusing him of fearing women. The claim enraged him so deeply that he renounced Nubia and vanished into another realm.

Afterward, Nubia assumed leadership of the floating island and vowed to guide her warriors toward peace. Hippolyta finally revealed Nubia's true origin to Diana. Although the sisters did not settle who had the right to the title of Wonder Woman, they forged a lasting bond of sisterhood. Over time, Nubia embraced her birthright and rejoined her mother and the Amazons on Paradise Island as a princess alongside his sister.

Nubia's next appearance comes in Supergirl #9 (December 1973) written by Robert Kanigher. In the story Supergirl is made an honorary Amazon. Later when it is discovered that Nubia is suffering from a mutated shark poisoning, Hippolyta sends Kara to retrieve a rare root needed to cure her.

In Super Friends #25 (October 1979), Wonder Woman, who is temporarily under the control of the evil Overlord, is seen attempting to liberate the oppressed women of the African continent. She tells them that men still treat women as if they were possessions and it is time for women to stand up to men, with Wonder Woman as a leader. Diana is interrupted by Nubia. She tells her to back off and they fight; eventually the Overlord is defeated, and they part as friends.

==== Long-term publication absence ====
It would be 20 years between Nubia's last pre-Crisis appearance in Super Friends #25 (October 1979) and first post-Crisis appearance in Wonder Woman (vol. 2) Annual #8 (September 1999). In the interim, new Black characters in Wonder Woman were introduced, such as Philippus, created by George Pérez for the 1987 reboot of the Wonder Woman comic book.

=== Nu'Bia ===
Nu'Bia from Wonder Woman (vol. 2) #154 (March 2000), art by John McCrea.

Sometime after Crisis on Infinite Earths, a new version of Nubia, now called Nu'Bia, was introduced. When Nu'Bia first meets Diana, she mistakenly calls Diana by the name of her former queen "Antiope". Nu'Bia is only slightly surprised to discover that Diana is Antiope's niece. The woman identifies herself to Diana as Nu'Bia and says that she was a Themysciran Amazon who won the "Tournament of Grace and Wonder" just as Diana previously had, and become the Amazons' first champion. Her assigned mission was to guard "Doom's Doorway", which is an entrance to the river Styx and the Tartarus Gate on Themyscira. Entering Doom's Doorway, she was to guard the entryway from the inside, stopping anyone from entering or any creature from escaping. As Diana was never told of Nu'Bia, it is assumed that the Themysciran Amazons assumed she perished during her mission long before Diana's birth. Sometime during her time in Hell, Nu'bia explains she met the Zoroastrian god of light, Ahura Mazda, and became his lover.

The next time Nu'Bia is shown, an elevator in a Las Vegas hotel suddenly manifests a golden metal lion insignia. When Diana investigates this strange occurrence, Nu'Bia steps out of the elevator. She says: "Many leagues from the kingdom of light have I traveled. Through the province of Nox and the territory of shades have I hunted the demon-king Ahriman. Finally, to track him here, to Patriarch's World...to my ancient faraway home. How passing strange it is then, Princess, that I should find you here, as well".

The demon Ahriman murdered Ahura Mazda, and carved his heart from his body. Nu'Bia had come back to earth in search of Ahriman, hoping that she can retrieve the heart and revive her lover. Nu'Bia had Ahriman in her possession and rides an elevator back to Hades to revive her beloved.

=== Nubia ===
After DC Rebirth and Infinite Frontier, Nubia is featured in a backup story in the series Future State: Immortal Wonder Woman. This depicts Nubia in Man's World. After "Future State" and a new version of the Multiverse were created, this version of Nubia is reintroduced as an Amazonian champion tasked with guarding Doom's Doorway, a hellish portal on Themyscira. Nubia shortly becomes Queen of Amazons when Hippolyta returns to Man's World to represent Diana in the newest iteration of the Justice League. After returning to the living, Diana officially blesses Nubia to share her title as Wonder Woman, in addition to her new role as Queen. While Nubia is no longer Diana's twin in a literal way, the two were both born on the same day and fostered a close relationship. Nubia is also shown as having a romantic relationship with the Amazon blacksmith Io.

== Other versions ==
=== Earth-23 ===
Renee Montoya ventures forth with Earth-5's Captain Marvel in an attempt to recruit each universe's equivalent of Superman to join Nix Uotan's Army of Heaven on Earth-Zero (the primary DC Earth). The beginning of the last Final Crisis issue illustrates their visit to a universe where a Black Superman is the President of the United States. This Superman confers with a Black Wonder Woman, whom he refers to as Nubia. This Nubia is apparently one of the "Wonder Women of Amazonia", and she uses a relic called the Wonder Horn to summon Renee and the others into her world.

This version of Nubia later reappears as a member of her Earth's Justice League, with her Earth officially revealed as Earth-23 in the new Multiverse.

=== Wonder Woman: Earth One ===
Nubia appears in the 2016 graphic novel Wonder Woman: Earth One. Queen Hippolyta's closest advisor and second-in-command of the Amazons, it is revealed that she had a romantic relationship with Hippolyta.

=== Injustice: Gods Among Us ===
Nubia appears in the comic series based on the 2017 video game Injustice 2. In the prologue to Injustice 2, Nubia is appointed as the new Wonder Woman of Themyscira after Diana's actions with the Regime from the first game (the Diana of the Injustice dimension having been morally corrupt and obsessed with her Earth's genocidal Superman before being defeated by a regular Wonder Woman from another reality).

=== Nubia: Real One ===
An original YA graphic novel Nubia: Real One, set in its own continuity, was written by L.L. McKinney and with art by Robyn Smith, following Nubia Johnson, the black twin sister of Diana Johnson/Wonder Girl. According to the publisher, the story "follows a teenage Nubia as she learns to embrace her true self in a world filled with racial inequality, school violence, and other timely issues affecting young people today". It was released on February 23, 2021.

=== Diana and Nubia: Princesses of the Amazons ===
A middle grade graphic novel that is the sequel to Diana: Princess of the Amazons by Shannon Hale and Dean Hale. In this comic, she and Diana are pre-teens who become sisters through a magic ritual.

== Powers and abilities ==
=== Pre-Crisis ===
Nubia possessed a magic sword created by Mars which was the only weapon on Earth that could counteract Diana's magic lasso. She could also glide on air currents like Wonder Woman and possessed super strength as well as all other Amazon abilities.

=== Post-Crisis ===
Nu'Bia wears special magical armor with an embossed lion's head on its breastplate. Nu'Bia has been shown traveling back and forth to Hades at will, and from there to other mythological realms. Typically, when she is about to appear at a new location the lion's head on her armor appears as part of the doorway, suggesting that the armor may be the source of this ability. In honor of an ancient pact, the Gorgons of the underworld blessed Nu'Bia with the "Cold Sight", which allows her to turn anyone to stone. She carries an unspecified magic sword.

Nu'Bia has 3,000 years of combat experience providing her expertise in both hand-to-hand combat as well as with handheld weapons. As a Themyscirian Amazon she also possesses immortality that allows her to live indefinitely in a youthful form, but does leave her open to potential injury and death depending on her actions. She also possesses enhanced strength and intelligence. As shown by fellow members of her tribe, she has the capability to break apart steel and concrete with her bare hands, jump over 12 feet from a standing position, has a high durability factor, enhanced healing, and the ability to absorb and process a vast amount of knowledge in a short period of time.

Nu'Bia, in addition to the other Themyscirian Amazons, possesses the ability to relieve her body of physical injury and toxins by becoming one with the Earth's soil and then reforming her body whole again. The first time Diana does this she prays to her god Gaea saying: "Gaea, I pray to you. Grant me your strength. You are the Earth who suckled me, who nurtured and bred me. Through you all life is renewed. The circle never ends. I pray you, mother Gaea, take me into your bosom. Please, let me be worthy". During writer John Byrne's time on the comic it was stated that this is a very sacred ritual to the Themyscirians, only to be used in the direst of circumstances.

== Collected editions ==
Title	Material collected	Pages	Published date	ISBN
Nubia & the Amazons	Nubia & the Amazons #1-6; and pages from Infinite Frontier #0	160	11/28/23	978-1779520555

== In other media ==
1977 Nubia doll by Mego.

=== Television ===
- Nubia was intended to appear in Wonder Woman (1975), but was ultimately cut. However, the character did appear in merchandise, sporting a gladiator-like costume and white hair streak, with the sequel comic book Wonder Woman '77 Meets the Bionic Woman retroactively revealing Carolyn Hamilton, portrayed by Jayne Kennedy in the television series, to have become Nubia.

=== Video games ===
- Nubia appears in DC Universe Online, voiced by Valoneecia Tolbert.
- Nubia appears as a playable character in MultiVersus, voiced by Kimberly Brooks.

=== Miscellaneous ===
- Nubia appears in the Challenge of the Superfriends digital comic.
- A variant of Nubia appears in Wonder Woman '77 Meets the Bionic Woman. This version is Carolyn Hamilton, a former enemy of Wonder Woman (portrayed by Jayne Kennedy in the television series) who became an Amazon commander.

== Bibliography ==
=== Nubia ===
- Wonder Woman #204–206
- Supergirl #9
- Super Friends #25

=== Nu'Bia ===
- Wonder Woman (vol. 2) Annual #8
- Wonder Woman (vol. 2) #154–155
- Wonder Woman (vol. 2) #188 (cameo)
