= Vita Ayala =

Afro-Puerto Rican comics writer

- Born: New York City, New York
- Occupation: Comic book writer
- Writing career
- Notable works: Submerged, The Wilds, Livewire, New Mutants, Nubia and the Amazons, Trial of the Amazons, Static: Season One
- Website: definitelyvita.com

Vita Ayala is an Afro-Puerto Rican comic book writer from New York City who has worked at Marvel Comics, DC Comics, and small press. They are best known for their work on New Mutants and Wonder Woman.

== Career ==
Ayala's first professionally published comic was DC's New Talent Showcase in 2017. This was the final project for DC's Talent Participation Program led by a number of DC comics talent, like Scott Snyder. Ayala then wrote stories for Batgirl, the Suicide Squad, and Batman Beyond.

In 2018, they announced their first indie comic, Submerged, from Vault Comics, a retelling of the Orpheus and Eurydice myth. In August, they were announced as the writer for the upcoming book Livewire from Valiant Entertainment, about the character of Amanda McKee/Livewire. "Amanda is a warrior, but a warrior with a cause. She doesn’t think that people are expendable, but she will do whatever it takes to make sure that the Greater Good (as she sees it) is served. I think she tends to be very much a 'needs of the many' and 'by any means necessary' sort of person, with very few exceptions. But she is growing and learning, and that process of change is what I want to focus on in this first arc of the book." In 2019, they became the writer for Dynamite's Xena: Warrior Princess comic.

In 2019, they were announced as the writer, alongside artist Germán Peralta, for Age of X-Man: Prisoner X. "To me, Bishop is the perfect mix of historian/detective and action hero, and I wanted to reflect that in the shape of the story." They then became the writer for the new Morbius ongoing and Nebula mini-series. Both books were impacted by the COVID-19 pandemic and eventually canceled. They were then announced, with artist Rod Reis, as the new creative team for New Mutants during the Dawn of X. "They are kind of the circle of the Venn diagram of my interests, storywise: headstrong teens/young adults, the potential for horror/heavy stories, found family dynamics, and a true variety of characters (in terms of gender, ethnicity, orientation, etc.)." They were also announced as the writer for the Children of the Atom mini-series.

Outside of Marvel, in 2019, they were announced as co-writing along with writer Danny Lore the new relaunch of James Bond for Dynamite Entertainment. The two then also published the comic Quarter Killer through ComiXology Originals. Ayala wrote the "Batgirls" backups for Future State: The Next Batman and, in 2021, became the writer for Static: Season One for the new Milestone Media. "One of the things that I've always really liked about Virgil that I hoped to replicate in a more contemporary way was that he's a weirdo. He's a weird, smart Black kid who plays Dungeons & Dragons with his friends. And he's kind of a fanboy." In 2023, a sequel, Static: Shadows of Dakota, was released.

In 2021, they became the co-writer along with Stephanie Williams for Nubia and the Amazons, a companion book to Wonder Woman and prelude to Trial of the Amazons starring Nubia. This book introduced marked the first appearance of a trans Amazon. Following Trial of the Amazons, Ayala co-wrote the Nubia: Coronation Special and wrote the one-shot Artemis: Wanted. In addition, Ayala wrote a six-part Batman/Zatanna story for Batman: Urban Legends #11-16.

In 2022–23, they co-wrote with Mariko Tamaki the four-issue mini-series Peter Parker & Miles Morales, Spider-Men: Double Trouble. In 2024, they were announced as the writer for the comic adaptation of Tamora Pierce's Song of the Lioness. They will also write the one-shot Finders//Keepers for Image Comics' The Horizon Experiment, a project run by writer Pornsak Pichetshote and editor Will Dennis.

== Personal life ==
Ayala is queer and non-binary. They live in New York City with their wife.

== Bibliography ==
=== Marvel Comics ===
- 2020 Ironheart #1-2 (2020)
- Black Panther
  - Shuri #6-7 (2019)
  - Marvel Action: Black Panther #4-6 (2019)
- Ghost-Spider Annual #1 (2019)
- Heroes Reborn: Night-Gwen #1 (2021)
- Incredible Hulk vol 4 #5, short story "Power Man No More" (2023)
- Marvel Comics #1001, short story "This Means War" (2019)
- Marvel Knights 20th #4 (2018)
- Marvel's Voices
  - Marvel's Voices #1, short story "Race" (2020)
  - Marvel's Voices: Pride #1, short story "You Deserve" (2021)
  - Marvel's Voices: Spider-Verse #1, short story "Birthday Bash" (2023)
- Morbius #1-5 (2019–2020)
- Nebula #1-2 (2020)
- Peter Parker & Miles Morales: Spider-Men: Double Trouble #1-4 (2022–2023)
- X-Men
  - Merry X-Men Holiday Special #1, short story "Secret Santa" (2018)
  - Age of X-Man: Prisoner X #1-5 (2019)
  - Empyre: X-Men #3 (2020)
  - Marauders #13 (2020)
  - New Mutants #14-28, 30 (2020–2022)
  - Wolverine: Black, White & Blood #2, short story "Unfinished Business" (2020)
  - Children of the Atom #1-6 (2021)

=== DC Comics ===
- Aquaman Annual vol 8 #2 (2019)
- Batman
  - Batgirl Annual vol 5 #1 (2017)
  - Batman Beyond vol 6 #12 (2017)
  - Batman Secret Files #3, short story "Don't Hold Your Breath" (2020)
  - Future State: The Next Batman #1-2, backup "Batgirls" (2021)
  - Batman: Urban Legends #11-16, six-part story "Bound to Our Will" (2022)
- Cursed Comics Cavalcade #1, short story "Siren Song" (2018)
- Dark Nights: Death Metal Guidebook #1, short story "Seeds of Hope" (2020)
- DC Pride #1, short story "Try the Girl" (2021)
- DC Rebirth Holiday Special #1, short story "The Epiphany" (2017)
- DC's Beach Blanket Bad Guys Summer Special #1, short story "False Idols" (2028)
- Flash Facts, short story "(Sub)Atomic" (2021)
- Green Arrow 80th Anniversary 100-Page Spectacular #1, short story "Happy Anniversary" (2021)
- Legends of the Swamp Thing: Halloween Spectacular #1, short story "Sleeping Giant" (2020)
- New Talent Showcase vol 2 #1, short story "Blood & Glory" (2017)
- New Year's Evil vol 2 #1, short story "Little Christmas Tree" (2020)
- Static
  - Static: Season One #1-6 (2021–2022)
  - Static: Shadows of Dakota #1-7 (2023–2024)
- Suicide Squad Most Wanted: El Diablo and Amanda Waller #5-6, backup story "Down the Rabbit Hole" (2017)
- Supergirl vol 7 #19 (2018)
- Tales from the Dark Multiverse: Wonder Woman: War of the Gods #1 (2021)
- Wonder Woman
  - Wonder Woman Annual #3, short story "In Defense of Truth and Justice" (2017)
  - Wonder Woman #750, short story "Always," #781-784, 787, backup stories (2020, 2022)
  - Wonder Woman 80th Anniversary 100-Page Spectacular #1, short story "Better Angels" (2021)
  - Nubia and the Amazons #1-6 (2021–2022)
  - Trial of the Amazons #1-2 (2022)
  - Nubia: Coronation Special #1 (2022)
  - Artemis: Wanted #1 (2022)

=== Other Companies ===
==== Black Mask Studios ====
- BLACK [AF] Devil's Dye #1-3 (2018)

==== Dark Horse ====
- The Secret Loves of Geeks (2018)

==== Dynamite Entertainment ====
- James Bond #1-6 (2019)
- Xena: Warrior Princess vol 2 #1-6 (2019)

==== IDW ====
- Star Wars Adventures #9 (2021)
- The High Republic Adventures: Galactic Bake-Off Spectacular #1 (2022)
- Star Trek: Celebrations #1 (2024)

==== Image Comics ====
- Bitch Planet: Triple Feature #4 (2017)
- The Old Guard: Tales Through Time #6 (2021)
- The Silver Coin #9 (2022)
- Twisted Romance #2, prose backup (2018)
- Razorblades: The Horror Magazine #1 (2022)

==== Lion Forge Comics ====
- Puerto Rico Strong (2018)

==== Valiant Entertainment ====
- Livewire #1-12 (2018–2019)

==== Vault Comics ====
- Submerged #1

=== Non-Comics Work ===
- Jessica Jones: Playing With Fire, a serialized audiobook from Serial Box (2021). Writers were Vita Ayala, Sam Beckbessinger, Zoe Quinn, Elsa Sjunneson.
