= Kia Damon =

American chef

- Born: 1993 (age 31–32); Orlando, Florida, U.S.
- Culinary career
- Previous restaurant(s): Lalito, Chinatown, Manhattan, (2018-2019)
- Website: kiacooks.com

Kia Damon (born 1993) is an American chef. She rose to prominence after she was promoted to the role of head chef of Lalito in Manhattan's Chinatown at age 24. Damon went on to compete on and win an episode of Chopped in 2020. She is the culinary director for food magazine Cherry Bombe.

== Career ==
Damon was born and raised in Orlando, Florida, where she began her career working at various restaurants, fast food chains, and food trucks. She was a sous-chef living and working in Tallahassee before she relocated to New York to continue her career. Damon was always the only Black woman chef in every kitchen where she worked.

In 2018, she took a job as a sous-chef at the Chinatown restaurant Lalito, Damon gained prominence when was promoted to head chef after just a few months of work, when she was 24 years old. Damon left the role in June 2019, noting resistance from the owner to accept her ideas for menu changes.

Damon was invited to be a contestant on Chopped, and went on to win the episode, which aired in August 2020. She stated that she had watched the show growing up and her father encouraged her to be a contestant on it when she was still a teenager.

In 2020, Cherry Bombe named Damon as the magazine's first culinary director. There she runs a test kitchen and hosts an Instagram Live show, On the Line, where she highlights the work of contemporary chefs.

Damon shares her experiences in the cooking world using her Instagram. She credits "authenticity" with her rise to prominence, and uses the platform to share barriers she has experienced, including microaggressions and struggles with her mental health.

== Other work ==
Damon provided food support at the George Floyd protests in New York, and cited chef and Civil Rights Movement activist Georgia Gilmore as a longtime inspiration.

She contributed writing to the 2020 nonfiction book Black Futures edited by Kimberly Drew and Jenna Wortham.

In August 2020 Damon founded s Kia Feeds The People, her forthcoming mutual aid initiative, which will provide free groceries in Bed Stuy.

== Personal life ==
Damon resides in Brooklyn. She is queer.
