= Florence Ngala =

American photographer

Flo Ngala
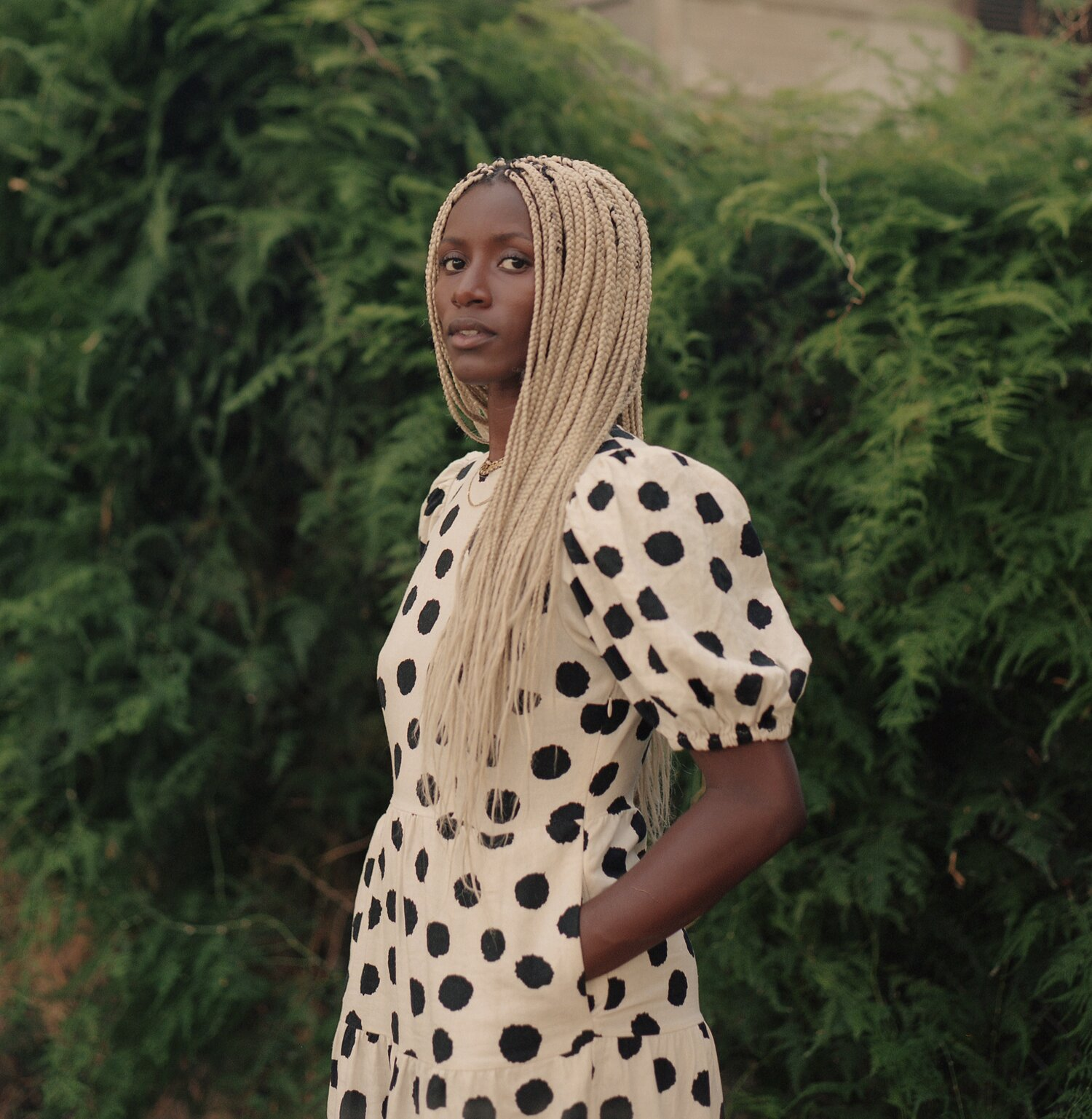
- Born: Florence Ngala; Harlem, New York City, U.S.
- Education: Horace Mann School
- Occupation: Photographer

Florence "Flo" Ngala is an African-American photographer and photojournalist known for her street, celebrity and portrait photography. Ngala's work has been featured on front covers of The New York Times, Billboard and Essence. In 2022, she became the first Black woman commissioned by Vogue to photograph the MET Gala.

Ngala has photographed Stacey Abrams, Sarah Jessica Parker, Method Man, and Wizkid; and started her career as a personal photographer to Cardi B. She is a Forbes 30 Under 30 2023 recipient for Art & Style.

== Early life ==
Born in Harlem, New York, Ngala is one of four children of Thomas and Tina Ngala. Her parents are from Nigeria and Cameroon, and ran their own hair braiding and beauty salon in Harlem from the 1990s to 2000s. Ngala credits early exposure to "entrepreneurship…beautiful artistry and black excellence" in Harlem as a key inspiration for her initial foray into photography.

=== Figure Skating in Harlem ===
From age 6 until she graduated high school, Ngala figure skated with Harlem-based non-profit, Figure Skating in Harlem. She became a captain of the non-profit's first competitive synchronized team. While a student, Ngala photographed her teammates and almost a decade later in her photography career went on to capture Figure Skating in Harlem in a photo essay for The New York Times.

=== Self-Portraits ===
Ngala's early photographic attempts and education explored self-portraiture. "A big part of understanding how to use the camera–and discovering what [she] liked about the medium– was making self-portraits." By layering expressions and poses, Ngala "learned how to shoot other people by taking pictures of [her]self."

=== Education ===
Ngala attended the Horace Mann School from 2008 to 2013. At 13, she participated in her first photography class. At Horace Mann she produced self-portraits and street photography, graduating with the Excellence in Visual Arts Award. As a student, she was influenced by early social media use of Tumblr "being on it so much as a teen helped me become a photographer... I was flipping through so much good work." In 2015, an early self-portrait went viral on the site.

After high school, Ngala attended City College of New York and graduated Cum Laude with a Bachelor's of Science in Communications. While enrolled in CCNY, Ngala was selected as an intern for The Schomburg Center for Research in Black Culture. She was given access to a variety of culturally important images through Black history and the opportunity to meet the scholars who contributed to them. After graduating, her photography portfolio was awarded first prize in a national competition and led to an internship with Droga5 in New York City. A few months into the internship, at 22, Ngala decided to begin a full-time career in photography.

== Career ==
Ngala's work is known for referring to duality in public and private personas of celebrities. Her images depict "off guard" moments captured of subjects that are deemed "real" or "transparent" by viewers.

Her first work in music came after appearing as an extra in the music video for "All the Way Up". An executive producer of the video saw her behind the scenes images on set and connected Ngala with label Atlantic Records leading work with musician Gucci Mane in New York after his 2016 prison release. In 2017, Ngala was commissioned to photograph Cardi B's first live television performance at the 2017 BET Awards. She went on to be a personal photographer for the rapper in early stages of her career. Behind-the-scenes images of Cardi getting ready for The Met Gala, show appearances, and on set of record breaking videos like "Up" and "WAP ft. Megan Thee Stallion" are included in Ngala's coverage.

Other celebrity commissions include politician Stacey Abrams for Rolling Stone, Wu-Tang member Method Man for Essence, and musicians like Drake, Burna Boy, Tierra Whack, Nas, Busta Rhymes, City Girls, Lil Uzi Vert, and The Weeknd.

=== Photojournalism ===
==== "When I Skate It Just Feels Free" / The New York Times ====
In 2018, Ngala returned to her figure skating alma mater, the non-profit, Figure Skating in Harlem, to document a photo essay for The New York Times. Ngala captured female figure skaters of color for a photo essay that appeared on the front page of The New York Times. The photographs would later be displayed in her first solo show, Harlem Ice: The Select Folders at Compére Collective Gallery in New York City.

==== "Why We Protest" / Rolling Stone ====
Following the murder of George Floyd in 2020, Ngala joined protests in New York City against police brutality and demanding change globally. Select images of hers were featured in publications like Rolling Stone The New York Times, and GQ. Ngala was also vocal on social media, sharing posts with her photography.

In 2022 and 2023, Ngala was invited by Vogue to take photos of the annual MET Gala thus becoming the first Black woman to do so in the 74-year history.

=== Commercial and Editorial ===
Ngala has photographed Simone Biles for Athleta, Cardi B for Reebok, Nike Pride and Black History campaigns, as well as work for Adidas, Bank of America and others. In 2020, Ngala photographed the creators of the Netflix docu-series Self-Made: Inspired by the Life of Madame C.J. Walker. She later photographed Madame C.J. Walker's great great-granddaughter, A’Leila Bundles. In 2022, Ngala photographed clothing designer Kerby Jean-Raymond's, Pyer Moss couture show on the estate of Madame C.J. Walker, the nation's first self-made Black woman millionaire.

== Outreach ==
Ngala is a presenter at schools often speaking about photography, career building and advocacy for woman of color in the entertainment industry. Her shooting style is referred to as "Flo On the Wall". In the 2022 Netflix docu-series Strong Black Lens, she states, "I think that the way people of color are profiled is a huge reason that being a person of color who has a lens, who has the opportunity to capture that truth, capture that integrity is really, really empowering."

The aesthetic style of her photos is rooted in Ngala's specific way of seeing the world in terms of lighting and how lighting is crucial in capturing the innate glow of a subject's skin.

== Photography ==
=== Notable Photographs ===
- Sasha Obama with Cardi B and Offset at the 2018 Broccoli Fest.
- Stacey Abrams for Rolling Stone.
- Method Man for Essence.
- Burna Boy's 1st Grammy Award.
- Kim Kardashian, Kendall Jenner, and Kylie Jenner at the Met Gala.

=== Photography featured in ===
- Black Futures, by Jenna Wortham & Kimberly Drew, publisher One World, 2020, ISBN 039918113X
- Ice Cold, by Vikki Tobak, publisher TASCHEN, 2022, ISBN 3836584972

=== Exhibitions ===
- Harlem Ice at Compere Collective, 2019
- Africa Fashion at V&A Museum, 2022
- Been Seen Schomburg Center, 2022

== Awards ==
In 2022 Ngala was awarded the Culture Creators Visual Arts Award.

In January 2022, Ngala was named to the 2nd Annual Foot Locker Award Sole List honoring "Black photographers whose work showcases authentic images.”

Forbes 30 Under 30 List 2023
