= Roxane Gay =

American writer (born 1974)

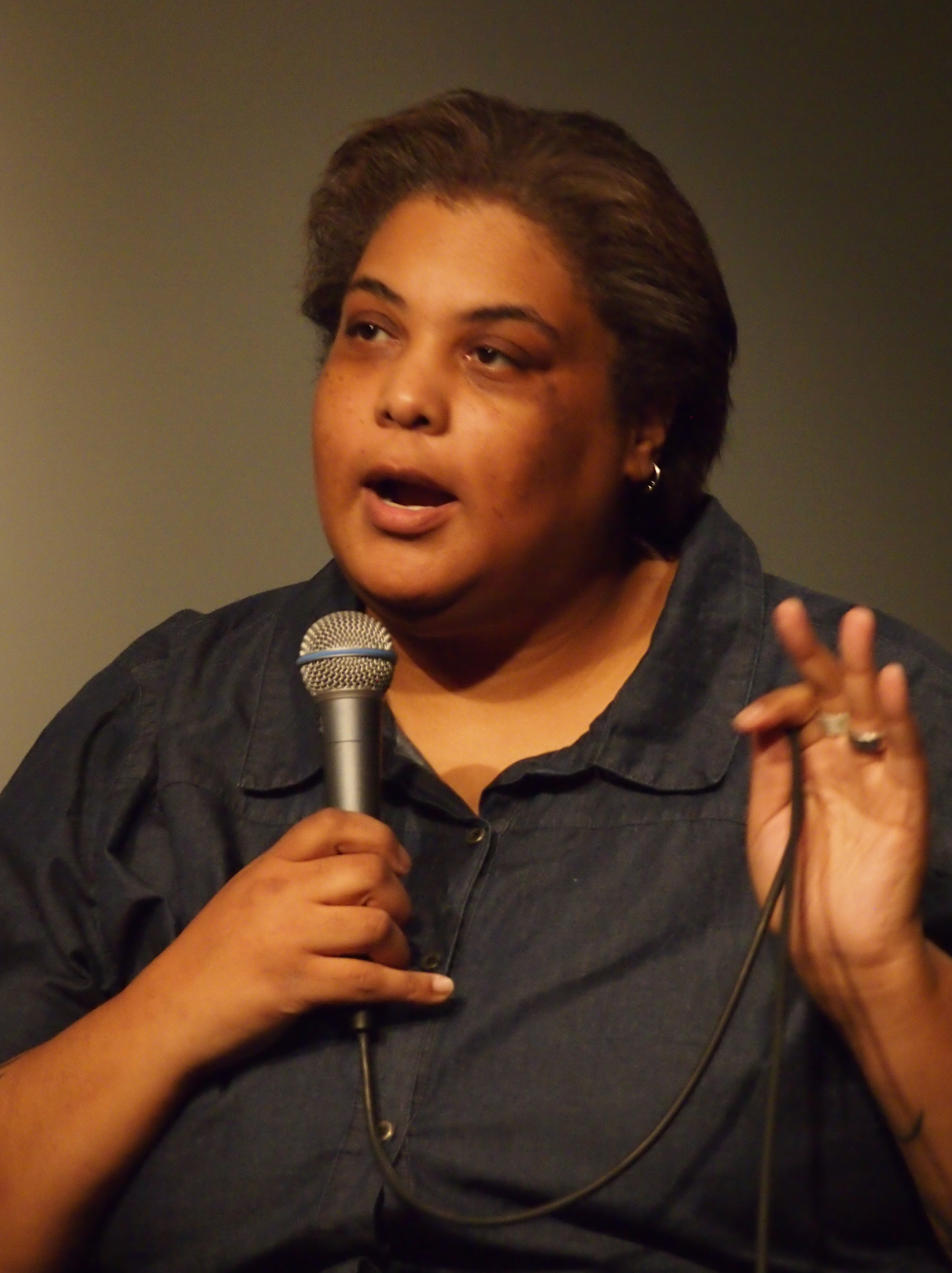
- Gay in 2014
- Born: October 15, 1974 (age 52); Omaha, Nebraska, U.S.
- Education: Yale University; Norwich University (BA); University of Nebraska–Lincoln (MA); Michigan Technological University (PhD)
- Occupations: Professor, writer
- Spouse: Debbie Millman (m. 2020)
- Relatives: Claudine Gay (cousin)
- Writing career
- Genres: Novel, short story, criticism
- Scientific career
- Fields: Communication studies
- Thesis: Subverting the subject position: toward a new discourse about students as writers and engineering students as technical communicators (2010)
- Doctoral advisor: Ann Brady
- Website: roxanegay.com

Roxane Gay (born October 15, 1974) is an American writer, professor, editor, and social commentator. Gay is the author of The New York Times best-selling essay collection Bad Feminist (2014), as well as the short story collection Ayiti (2011), the novel An Untamed State (2014), the short story collection Difficult Women (2017), and the memoir Hunger (2017).

Gay is the Gloria Steinem Endowed Chair in Media, Culture and Feminist Studies at Rutgers University. She was an assistant professor at Eastern Illinois University for four years before joining Purdue University as an associate professor of English, where she was tenured. In 2018, she left Purdue to become a visiting professor at Yale University. She joined Rutgers in 2022.

Gay is a contributing opinion writer at The New York Times, founder of Tiny Hardcore Press, essays editor for The Rumpus, and the editor for Gay Mag, which was founded in partnership with Medium.

== Early life and education ==
Gay was born in Omaha, Nebraska, on October 15, 1974, to Michael and Nicole Gay, both of Haitian descent. Her mother was a homemaker and her father is owner of GDG Béton et Construction, a Haitian concrete company. She is a cousin of Harvard University professor Claudine Gay. Gay was raised Catholic and spent her summers visiting family in Haiti. She attended high school at Phillips Exeter Academy in New Hampshire. Gay began writing essays as a teenager, with much of her early work being influenced by her experience with childhood sexual violence. Her parents were relatively wealthy, supporting her through college and paying her rent until she was 30.

After graduating from Phillips Exeter Academy in Exeter, New Hampshire, Gay began her undergraduate studies at Yale University, but dropped out in her junior year to pursue a relationship in Arizona. She completed her undergraduate degree at Vermont College at Norwich University, and also received a master's degree with an emphasis in creative writing from the University of Nebraska–Lincoln.

Gay received a Doctor of Philosophy in Rhetoric and Technical Communication from Michigan Technological University in 2010. She was inducted into the Omicron Delta Kappa Circle. Her dissertation is titled Subverting the Subject Position: Toward a New Discourse About Students as Writers and Engineering Students as Technical Communicators. Ann Brady served as her dissertation advisor.

== Career ==
After completing her Ph.D., Gay began her academic teaching career in 2010 at Eastern Illinois University, where she was assistant professor of English. While at EIU, she was a contributing editor for Bluestem magazine, and she also founded Tiny Hardcore Press. Gay worked at Eastern Illinois University until the end of the 2013–14 academic year. She was an associate professor of creative writing in the Master of Fine Arts program at Purdue University from August 2014 until 2018. Gay announced her departure from Purdue in October 2018, voicing concerns about the fairness of her compensation and noting Purdue had failed to address the issue. For the spring of 2019 Gay was a visiting professor at Yale University. In 2022, she joined Rutgers University, becoming the Gloria Steinem Endowed Chair in Media, Culture and Feminist Studies.

Gay published a short-story collection, Ayiti (2011), then two books in 2014: the novel An Untamed State and the essay collection Bad Feminist (2014). A Time review noted: "Gay's writing is simple and direct, but never cold or sterile. She directly confronts complex issues of identity and privilege, but it's always accessible and insightful."

In May 2021, Gay announced she was starting a new imprint under Grove Atlantic, called Roxane Gay Books. The first three books to be published under the imprint were announced in 2023.

In 2023, Gay was one of more than 370 New York Times contributors to sign an open letter expressing "serious concerns about editorial bias" in the newspaper's reporting on transgender people. The letter characterized the reporting as using "an eerily familiar mix of pseudoscience and euphemistic, charged language", and raised concerns regarding the newspaper's employment practices regarding trans contributors. The following year, Gay published an essay in the New York Times decrying—despite the worthy tradition of Émile Zola's J'Accuse...! and Dr. Martin Luther King, Jr.'s "Letter from a Birmingham Jail"—the open letter as a form that "Should End," as it allows writers to "hold fast to [their] deeply held beliefs without having to question them or grapple with doubt" and to "mitigate... helplessness with performance rather than practice."

== Projects ==
=== An Untamed State ===
In 2014, Gay published her debut novel, An Untamed State, which centers around Mireille Duval Jameson, a Haitian-American woman who is kidnapped for ransom. The novel explores the interconnected themes of race, privilege, sexual violence, family, and the immigrant experience. An Untamed State is often referred to as a fairy tale because of its structure and style, especially in reference to the opening sentence, "Once upon a time, in a far-off land, I was kidnapped by a gang of fearless yet terrified young men with so much impossible hope beating inside their bodies it burned their very skin and strengthened their will right through their bones," and the author's exploration of the American dream and courtship of Mireille's parents.

The Guardian review by Attica Locke calling it "a breathtaking debut novel," and The Washington Post crediting it as "a smart, searing novel."

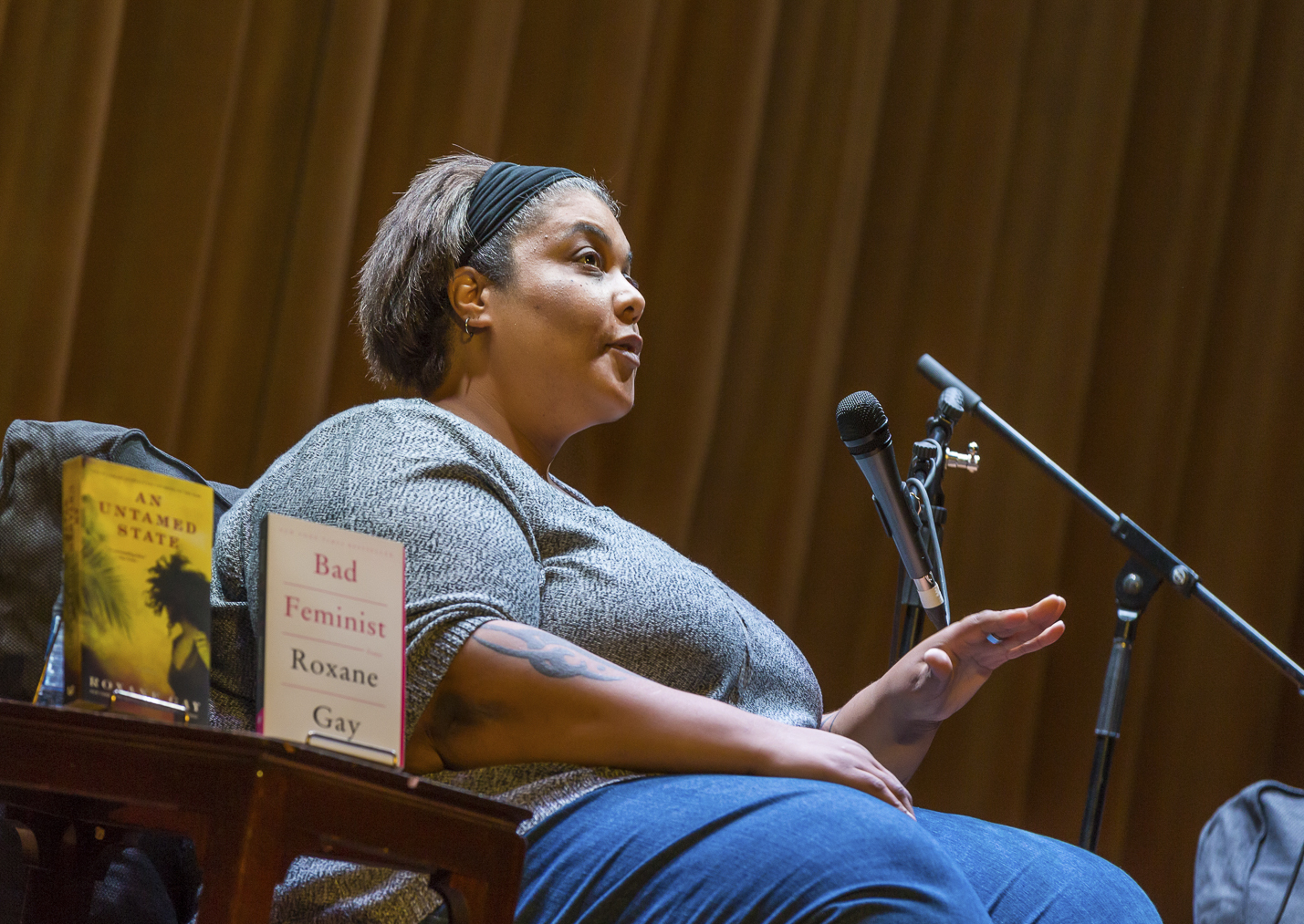
Gay being interviewed in 2015

=== Bad Feminist ===
Gay's collection of essays, Bad Feminist, was released in 2014 to widespread acclaim; it addresses both cultural and political issues, and became a New York Times best-seller. A Time magazine reviewer dubbed Bad Feminist "a manual on how to be human," and called Gay the "gift that keeps on giving." In a 2014 interview with the magazine, Gay explained her role as a feminist, and how it has influenced her writing: "In each of these essays, I'm very much trying to show how feminism influences my life for better or worse. It just shows what it's like to move through the world as a woman. It's not even about feminism per se, it's about humanity and empathy."

In The Guardian, critic Kira Cochrane offered a similar assessment, "While online discourse is often characterised by extreme, polarised opinions, her writing is distinct for being subtle and discursive, with an ability to see around corners, to recognise other points of view while carefully advancing her own. In print, on Twitter and in person, Gay has the voice of the friend you call first for advice, calm and sane as well as funny, someone who has seen a lot and takes no prisoners."

A group of feminist scholars and activists analyzed Gay's Bad Feminist for "Short Takes: Provocations on Public Feminism", an initiative of the feminist journal Signs: Journal of Women in Culture and Society.

=== World of Wakanda ===
In July 2016, Gay and poet Yona Harvey were announced as writers for Marvel Comics' World of Wakanda, a spin-off from the company's Black Panther title, making them the first black women to be lead writers for Marvel. Six issues of the comic were published.

Black Panther: World of Wakanda was hailed for its prominent portrayal of LGBTQ characters. The comic followed the journey of two lovers Aneka and Ayo, who are former members of the Dora Milaje, the Black Panther's female security force. The series follows the pair through multiple events, including the siege of their city by Thanos and the flooding of Wakanda by Namor.

The series' cancellation was confirmed in June 2017 by Gay, just two days after the premiere of the trailer for the Black Panther movie. The last issue was released in March 2017. Marvel stated no official reason for the cancellation; however, feminist tech site The Mary Sue pointed to a connection with Marvel's knock against "diversity titles" and Marvel VP David Gabriel's statement that "people didn't want any more diversity. They didn't want female characters out there. That's what we heard, whether we believe that or not. I don't know that that's really true, but that's what we saw in sales."

=== Difficult Women ===
In 2017, Gay published Difficult Women, a collection of short stories that highlight women who have lives that differ from society's spectrum of a normal life. Each story follows a different character and her journey through either a traumatic experience or what makes her different from societal norms. The stories explore difficult and complex topics such as the intertwined relationship of sex and violence.

=== Hunger ===
Hunger: A Memoir of (My) Body was released in June 2017. Throughout, Gay discusses her experience with weight, body image, and building a positive relationship with food, particularly following her experience as a childhood victim of sexual violence. At 12 years old, Gay was lured into a cabin by her then-boyfriend and gang raped by him and his friends. She describes the event as the catalyst for her rapid weight gain and lifelong issues with both her body and sexuality. Gay described the book as a testimony of "what it's like to live in a world that tried to discipline unruly bodies." The memoir received wide acclaim, praised by critics as "remarkable... ferociously honest," "arresting and candid," and "intimate and vulnerable."

She also wrote frankly about how she became morbidly obese and how society views her. She wrote that she became obese when she was in high school and is still to this day, despite decades of trying to lose weight. She explores a society and culture that shames her for her weight. She cites specifically the struggles she endures being obese, such as not being able to find clothes that fit her and the inability to sit in certain chairs. She described a publishing event in which she sat and broke a chair, and the public humiliation she felt. She stated in an interview with Vice, that she has often been misgendered due to her weight. She added, "Being fat means you aren’t desirable. So as a woman, you are basically degendered. People also often read fat bodies as male."

Following her national book tour in support of Hunger, Gay said she found press around the book "to be very challenging, because people just don't know how to talk about fat." In June 2017, Australian website Mamamia published an interview with Gay, revealing numerous details about how they prepared for her visit, which they described as a "logistical nightmare" because of the apparent consequence of her weight. On Twitter, Gay later described these preparations, including questions like "Will she fit into the office lift?" as both "cruel and humiliating". In an interview with The New York Times, Gay stated the controversial event was "helpful, in that I think people get to see, in real time, what fat-phobia looks like and just how careless people can be in considering that fat people deserve dignity. So I suppose it's a useful example of why I wrote the book."

At a February 2019 speaking event at USC, in the Q&A, supporters of the Revolutionary Communist Party criticized co-speaker Amanda Nguyen's work in the U.S. government during the war on terror; in response, Gay defended Nguyen on Twitter.

=== Not That Bad ===
Gay was the editor of the anthology titled Not That Bad: Dispatches from Rape Culture. The collection, published in 2018 by HarperCollins, features essays from Gay and 29 other authors, including Stacey May Fowles, Lyz Lenz, Samhita Mukhopadhyay, Ally Sheedy, Brandon Taylor, and Gabrielle Union.

=== Gay Magazine ===
Medium approached Gay in 2017 about the possibility of starting a "pop-up" magazine for the online publishing platform. The magazine would specialize in cultural criticism and provide pay for writers including Gay's work in an editorial capacity. The weekly online publication was produced with Medium's Deputy Editor Laura June and Managing Editor Kaitlyn Adams. The first issue, published in late April 2019, featured essays by Athena Dixon and Grace Lavery. In May 2019, Gay and Medium formally launched the new publication, Gay Magazine. The short-lived journal was also referred to on Medium as GAY The Magazine—The Best Stories About Culture and Gay Mag. The first of the planned quarterly themed editions appeared in June 2019; public submissions were solicited in addition to the commissioned articles. The final issue of Medium's Gay Magazine was themed 'Power' and was posted on April 3, 2020, during the COVID-19 pandemic's global lockdowns.

In October 2019, when asked about Gay Magazine, Gay responded, "I'm doing what I always aim to do as an editor, which is to create a literary space for a range of voices who have something smart and interesting to say — and more importantly, to be able to pay them well. One of the biggest challenges of the digital media landscape is that the money is concentrated at the top and it rarely trickles down to the editors and writers, so to be able to have the support of Medium to create a publication — for however long it lasts – where we can pay people equitably and fairly is a really great thing. There is so much good writing going on out there, and I love being able to have a small hand in bringing that into the world."

Following Gay and Wendy C. Ortiz's public accusation of plagiarism against Kate Elizabeth Russell on January 21, 2020, on January 29, Gay Magazine published an essay alleging that Russell's then-forthcoming novel My Dark Vanessa shared "eerie story similarities" to Oritz's memoir Excavation, calling My Dark Vanessa "fictionalized, sensationalized". The Associated Press reported that "[r]eviewers who looked at both books saw no evidence of plagiarism", and New York magazine found the same. In response to these allegations, Oprah Winfrey dropped My Dark Vanessa from her influential book club. Russell denied the allegations.

=== Unruly Bodies ===
In April 2018, Gay partnered with the online publishing platform Medium to create a month-long pop-up magazine called Unruly Bodies. The magazine explored the relationship people share with their bodies, through an anthology of essays by 25 writers (including Gay herself). Gay asked the 24 writers, "What does it mean to live in an unruly body?"; her book dealing with such issues, Hunger: A Memoir of (My) Body, had been published in 2017. In a 2018 interview, Gay said, "I was surprised because I expected that I might get a lot of repetition, of [subject], not of style, but people wrote about all kinds of things. They wrote about gender, size, gun violence, wrestling, sex, ability. The range of issues from that one prompt, with the way that writers responded, was wonderful, and affirmed that I made very good choices in the writers that I approached."

In April 2018, over a year before the actual launch of the online magazine, "Gay Magazine" posted 25 articles in response to Gay's query under the heading Unruly Bodies; the writers were: Kaveh Akbar, Gabrielle Bellot, S. Bear Bergman, Keah Brown, Meghan Carpentier, Mike Copperman, Jennine Capó Crucet, Kelly Davio, Mensah Demary, Danielle Evans, Roxane Gay, Casey Hannan, Samantha Irby, Randa Jarrar, Kima Jones, Kiese Laymon, Carmen Maria Machado, Terese Mailhot, Mary Anne Mohanraj, Brian Oliu, Tracy Lynne Oliver, Larissa Pham, Matthew Salesses, Chelsea G. Summers and Your Fat Friend.

=== The Banks ===
In December 2019, comic book publisher TKO Studios launched The Banks by Gay. The Banks is a heist thriller about the most successful thieves in Chicago: the women of the Banks family. TKO Studios announced in 2020 a partnership with Macro (whose films have garnered nine Oscar nominations and one Oscar win for Viola Davis in Fences) to produce a film adaptation of the graphic novel. The screenplay is to be written by Gay, who is also serving as executive producer.

=== The Audacity ===
In January 2021, Gay debuted her newsletter The Audacity, featuring essays by herself and emerging writers on a bi-weekly basis. It is also home to The Audacious Book Club, which features one book per month highlighting new works from underrepresented American writers. It started with Black Futures by Kimberly Drew and Jenna Wortham, followed by Torrey Peters' debut novel Detransition, Baby in February. Also featured in 2021 are books by Brandon Hobson, Ashley C. Ford, and Anthony Veasna So.

=== Other projects ===
Gay was the editor of The Butter, an online feminist writing site and sister site to The Toast, from November 2014 to August 2015. The Butter featured writing on subjects including disability, literature, family, and music. The Butter ceased publishing in August 2015, with Gay stating she was "simply stretched too thin."

Gay was a U.S. Guardian columnist from 2015 to 2018.

Gay was the guest judge and guest editor of The Masters Review annual fiction anthology in 2017.

Gay was featured in a five-minute segment of This American Life on June 17, 2016, talking about her body and how she is perceived as a fat person.

Gay announced in January 2017 that she was pulling her book How to Be Heard, originally set to be published in 2018 by TED Books, an imprint of Simon & Schuster, due to her objections to alt-right journalist Milo Yiannopoulos receiving a book deal from another Simon & Schuster imprint.

She also edited the book Girl Crush: Women's Erotic Fantasies. In addition to her regular contributions to Salon and the now-defunct HTMLGiant, her writing has appeared in Best American Mystery Stories 2014, Best American Short Stories 2012, Best Sex Writing 2012, A Public Space, McSweeney's, Tin House, Oxford American, American Short Fiction, West Branch, Virginia Quarterly Review, NOON, Bookforum, Time, The Los Angeles Times, The Nation and The New York Times Book Review. She is a contributor to the 2019 anthology Daughters of Africa, edited by Margaret Busby.

Gay was featured in the 2016 book In the Company of Women: Inspiration and Advice from over 100 Makers, Artists, and Entrepreneurs.

In July 2019, Gay launched a book club on HBO's Vice News Tonight.

In 2019, Gay partnered with Tressie McMillan Cottom to create a black feminist podcast titled Hear To Slay, which featured influential black women as guests, including Stacey Abrams, Gabrielle Union, and Ava DuVernay. In 2022, the podcast was relaunched as The Roxane Gay Agenda.

In 2022, Gay partnered with the stationery company Baron Fig on a notebook designed to aid consumers' writing processes. She revealed in 2023 that she has been experiencing writer's block for five years.

In 2025, it was announced that Gay and her partner Debbie Millman were the new owners of The Rumpus.

== Themes ==
Much of Gay's written work deals with the analysis and deconstruction of feminist and racial issues through the lens of her personal experiences with race, gender identity, and sexuality.

== Personal life ==
Gay is bisexual. In October 2019, she became engaged to artist and writer Debbie Millman. In August 2020, Gay revealed that they had eloped.

In January 2018, Gay revealed that she had undergone sleeve gastrectomy, a bariatric surgery that removes 75–85% of the stomach. She is 6 feet 3 inches (1.91 m) tall.

== Awards and honors ==
In 2020, in honor of the 50th anniversary of the first LGBTQ Pride parade, Queerty named Gay among the fifty heroes "leading the nation toward equality, acceptance, and dignity for all people". She was also included in the 2022 Fast Company Queer 50 list.

Year	Title	Award/Honor	Result	Ref.
2015	—	PEN Center USA Freedom to Write Award	Winner	
2017	Hunger	National Book Critics Circle Award for Memoir	Finalist	
2018	—	Guggenheim Fellowship for Creative Arts in General Nonfiction	Recipient	
2018	—	Lambda Literary Board of Trustees Award for Excellence in Literature	Winner	
2018	Hunger	Lambda Literary Award for Bisexual Literature	Winner	
2018	World of Wakanda	Eisner Award for Best Limited Series	Winner	
2019	Hear to Slay	Podcast Hosts of the Year	Winner	
2021	—	PEN Oakland Gary Webb Anti-Censorship Award	Winner	
2025		Literarian Award for Outstanding Service to the American Literary Community	Winner	

== Published works ==
=== Fiction ===
- Gay, Roxane (2011). Ayiti. New York/Oregon: Artistically Declined Press. ISBN 9781450776714.
- — (2014). An Untamed State. New York: Black Cat / Grove Atlantic. ISBN 9780802122513.
- — (2017). Difficult Women. New York: Grove Atlantic. ISBN 9780802125392.

=== Selected short fiction ===
- Gay, Roxane (July 6, 2016). "Group Fitness". Oxford American. No. 60.
- — (2013). "The Year I Learned Everything". Prairie Schooner. 87 (1): 23–41. doi:10.1353/psg.2013.0032. JSTOR 24640291. S2CID 201761324.

=== Comics ===
- Black Panther: World of Wakanda #1-5 (#2-5 co-written with Ta-Nehisi Coates) with Alitha Martinez, "Dawn of the Midnight Angels", 2017, Marvel Comics. Collected as:
  - Black Panther: World of Wakanda (tpb, 144 pages, 2017, ISBN 1-30290-650-X).
- Marvel's Voices #1, "Punishment" (with Brittney Williams), Marvel Comics, 2020.
- The Banks #1-6, with Ming Doyle, 2019, TKO Studios. Collected as:
  - The Banks (tpb, 155 pages, 2019, ISBN 9781732748583).
- The Sacrifice of Darkness (co-written with Tracy Lynne Oliver), with Rebecca Kirby, (hc, 128 pages, 2020, Archaia Entertainment, ISBN 978-1684156245).

=== Non-fiction ===
- Gay, Roxane (2014). Bad Feminist. New York: Harper Perennial. ISBN 9780062282729.
- — (2017). Hunger: A Memoir of (My) Body. New York: Harper. ISBN 9780062362599.
- — (2023). Opinions: A Decade of Arguments, Criticism, and Minding Other People's Business. New York: Harper Collins. ISBN 9780063341463.
- Pillow, Megan; Gay, Roxane (2024). Do the Work: A Guide to Understanding Power and Creating Change. illustrated by Aurélia Durand. London: Leaping Hare Press. ISBN 9780711268968.

=== Edited works ===
- Gay, Roxane, ed. (2018). Not That Bad: Dispatches from Rape Culture. New York: Harper. ISBN 9780062851468.

=== Other selected works ===
- Gay, Roxane (2010). Subverting the Subject Position: Toward a New Discourse About Students as Writers and Engineering Students as Technical Communicators (Thesis/dissertation). Houghton, MI: Michigan Technological University. OCLC 774576963.
