= Hunger: A Memoir of (My) Body =

2017 memoir by Roxane Gay

- Author: Roxane Gay
- Language: English
- Subject: Weight; sexuality; trauma
- Genre: Memoir
- Publisher: HarperCollins
- Publication date: June 13, 2017
- Pages: 320
- ISBN: 978-0-06-236259-9 (Hardcover)
- Website: Hunger at HarperCollins

Hunger: A Memoir of (My) Body is a 2017 memoir by Roxane Gay, published on June 13, 2017, by HarperCollins in New York, New York.

Gay has described Hunger as being "by far the hardest book I've ever had to write." The parentheses that encompass the word "my" in the title signifies the physical barrier of weight-gain that Gay has built for herself in response to her emotional trauma, and also "marks the difficulty of the bracketed female self and voice busting out of its allegorical seams."

== Content ==
In Hunger: A Memoir of (My) Body, Gay describes her experience of her body, her relationship to food and weight, and her experience as a victim of sexual violence. Gay gained weight in the wake of her trauma, as both a means of comfort and of protecting herself from the world, and describes the book as being about "living in the world when you are three or four hundred pounds overweight, when you are not obese or morbidly obese but super morbidly obese." Gay explains that this desire for protection through binge eating began as a coping mechanism in order to become physically larger and "repulsive" to men. By avoiding the male gaze, Gay as a child pursued her own safety from further sexual assault. Reviewing the book in The Atlantic, Adrienne Green wrote, "The story of Roxane Gay's body did not begin with this violation of her innocence, but it was the fracture that would come to define her relationship with food, desire, and denial for decades." Beyond the event of the rape and subsequent weight gain, Gay discusses her relationship with family, friends, food, gyms, travel, and her own narrative as a result of the size of her body.

Gay informs the reader of what it is like to receive constant, and often vocal, public protests in reaction to the appearance of her body, as people express anger and disgust towards its lack of conformity with current beauty standards. She describes how just the simple act of walking down the street can mean having to deal with negative and cruel verbal epithets: "When I am walking down the street, men lean out of their car windows and shout vulgar things at me about my body, how they see it, and how it upsets them that I am not catering to their gaze and their preferences and desires."

In Vox, Constance Grady described Hunger as "an intimate and vulnerable memoir, one that takes its readers into dark and uncomfortable places. Gay examines wells of trauma and horror, not sparing her own self-loathing from her forthright analytic eye. But all the while, she insists on her right to be treated with dignity." Gay also addresses the concept of personal space, and how being obese has affected the way people perceive and treat her in her day-to-day life. She criticizes the female clothing market, weight-loss systems and their advertisements, public figures, public transportation, and certain agencies with whom she conducts business for not conscientiously accommodating to the needs of those who are overweight. She remarks how this negligence is damaging to her identity and self-esteem.

== Reception ==
Hunger was widely and favorably reviewed.

In the Los Angeles Times, Rebecca Carroll described the book as "a bracingly vivid account of how intellect, emotion and physicality speak to each other and work in tireless tandem to not just survive unspeakable hurt, but to create a life worth living and celebrating." In USA Today, Charisse Jones gave the book three and a half of four stars, saying Gay's "spare prose, written with a raw grace, heightens the emotional resonance of her story, making each observation sharper, each revelation more riveting, and also sometimes difficult to bear." At the same time, Kirkus Reviews writes Gay is "just as engaging when discussing her bisexuality and her adoration for Ina Garten, who taught her 'that a woman can be plump and pleasant and absolutely in love with food.'" Nadia Craddock says that "Gay proceeds to write with both extreme vulnerability and grace" about her life and experiences.

However, in a negative review in British conservative magazine The Spectator, Julie Burchill described Hunger as "despite the sad and shocking subject matter—just another addition to the ever-growing canon of the suffering sisterhood of solipsism."

Awards and honors for Hunger
Year	Award/Honor	Result	Ref.
2017	Goodreads Choice Award for Memoir & Autobiography	Finalist	
2017	National Book Critics Circle Award for Memoir	Finalist	
2017	Reading Women Award for Nonfiction	Shortlist	
2018	Andrew Carnegie Medal for Nonfiction	Longlist	
2018	Brooklyn Public Library Literary Prize for Nonfiction	Shortlist	
2018	Lambda Literary Award for Bisexual Literature	Winner	

== See also ==
- Bad Feminist
