= Ormes Society =

Comic book industry group

The Ormes Society is an online group that promotes black women who work in the comic book industry. The organization is named after Jackie Ormes, a pioneering African-American comic artist.

== History ==
The Ormes Society was founded in 2007 by artist Cheryl Lynn Eaton. Eaton was upset by the comic book industry's lack of diversity and wanted to help support black women and fans. She named the organization after Jackie Ormes, a pioneer African-American comic illustrator and America’s first black female professional cartoonist. The website for the group became a hub where comic book creators could network with one another. The site itself also acted as an archive of members' artwork.

The group ended briefly in July 2015, when Eaton felt that there was no longer a need for it. It was briefly rebooted a year later but as of 2021 it appears to be defunct once again as its website is gone and its social media has not been updated since 2017.

Members of the group included Charlie Trotman, Carol Burrell, Afua Richardson and Alitha Martinez.
