= Cheryl Lynn Eaton =

American comic book writer

- Born: Atlanta, Georgia, U.S.
- Occupations: Writer, editor, journalist
- Years active: 2000s–present
- Notable work: Black Panther: Blood Hunt (2023), Marvel's Voices Infinity Comic (2023)

Cheryl Lynn Eaton is an American writer, editor, and journalist based in Atlanta, Georgia. She is known for her contributions to comics and pop culture journalism, with a focus on Black culture and representation. Eaton has written for the comic book publishers Marvel and DC Comics and has contributed to several publications covering comics, culture, and identity.

== Early life and education ==
Details about Eaton’s early life and education are limited in public sources. She developed an interest in comics and pop culture at an early age and worked in a comic shop during her youth, which influenced her career path in the comic book industry.

== Career ==
=== Comic book writing ===
Eaton has written for the comic book publishers Marvel and DC Comics. Her notable works include Black Panther: Blood Hunt, a miniseries illustrated by Farid Karami, and Marvel's Voices Infinity Comic, focusing on the all-female superhero team A-Force.

Her writing often explores themes of identity, culture, and authentic representation in storytelling, particularly within the comic book medium.

Eaton founded the Ormes Society to promote African-American women that write comic books. The society is named after writer Jackie Ormes.

=== Editorial and journalism work ===
Eaton has worked as an editor at academic presses and contributed to pop-culture sites such as Racialicious, The Root, and Comics Alliance. She has written articles highlighting Black culture and issues of diversity in comics.

== Works ==
- Black Panther: Blood Hunt (Marvel, 2023) – miniseries illustrated by Farid Karami
- Marvel's Voices Infinity Comic (Marvel, 2023) – focuses on A-Force storyline
- New Talent Showcase: The Milestone Initiative, vol. 1 (August 2023), anthology
