= Lyz Lenz =

American writer and editor

- Born: 1982 (age 43–44)
- Education: Gustavus Adolphus College (BA)
- Occupations: Author, writer, editor
- Website: lyzlenz.com

Lyz Lenz (born 1982) is an American author and editor. She was a columnist at The Cedar Rapids Gazette and served as managing editor of The Rumpus. She is the author of God Land and Belabored.

== Life and career ==
Lenz moved from Vermillion, South Dakota to Minneapolis, Minnesota while in high school and attended Eden Prairie High School. She has an undergraduate degree from Gustavus Adolphus College. Lenz belonged to Evangelical churches but came into conflict with their orthodoxies including on the role of women in the church and the exclusion of gay and lesbian people.

Lenz's writing has been published by publications including the Columbia Journalism Review, The Washington Post, and The Gazette. A divorced mother, she wrote in Glamour about her self-imposed 2-year hiatus from cooking. As reported in Salon.com, Lenz stated she "ended my marriage after the 2016 election" because "I watched someone who said he loved me vote for someone who had been credibly accused of rape and who spoke about women like they were trash."

In September 2019, Lenz was a moderator for an LGBTQ discussion with U.S. presidential candidates Joe Biden, Kamala Harris, and Elizabeth Warren in Cedar Rapids, Iowa.

Lenz's first book, God Land, explores her personal experiences and the role of religion and politics in rural America during the Trump era, including accounts of visits to and meetings with groups such as the Rural Home Missionary Association.

Her second book, Belabored, focuses on the rights and autonomy that pregnant women ought to be afforded, the ways in which religion and politics impact how pregnant women are treated in the U.S., and her own experience of being pregnant.

In 2005 Lenz moved to Cedar Rapids, Iowa.

== Bibliography ==
- Lenz, Lyz (February 20, 2024). This American Ex-Wife. Crown. ISBN 9780593241127.
- Lenz, Lyz (August 11, 2020). Belabored. Bold Type Books. ISBN 9781541762824.
- Lenz, Lyz (August 1, 2019). God Land: A Story of Faith, Loss, and Renewal in Middle America. Indiana University Press. ISBN 9780253060860.
- Lenz, Lyz (2018). "All the Angry Women". In Gay, Roxanne (ed.). Not that Bad: Dispatches from Rape Culture. Harper Collins. ISBN 9780062413512.
- Lenz, Lyz (December 2019). "Cottonwood Creek". In Stroop, Chrissy; O'Neal, Lauren (eds.). Empty the Pews: Stories of Leaving the Church. Epiphany Publishing. ISBN 9781946093073.
