= Sam Feder =

American filmmaker

Sam Feder is a transgender American filmmaker whose work is focused on the exploration of visibility regarding race, class, and gender. Feder is concerned with bringing visibility to trans people's experiences, and prefers to be identified with gender-neutral pronouns. They are best known for the 2020 documentary Disclosure. Their films have been nominated for and received multiple awards, including The James Aronson Award for Social Justice Journalism, the GLAAD Media Award for Outstanding Documentary, and the Peabody Awards.

== Early life and education ==
Feder was born and raised in Brooklyn, New York. At fifteen years old, Feder bought a Pentax K1000 camera, and used it to make photo essays on neglected children and racism in Brooklyn. In high school, they became an HIV activist. During adolescence, Feder struggled with their identity, specifically with the images they saw of trans people in media. In an interview with Suyin Haynes of Time Magazine, they said "It wasn't really until I met trans people in real life did I understand; these images informed what I thought trans people were," In 2004, they received an MA degree in media studies from the New School, New York. In 2013, they received an MFA degree from the Integrated Media Arts graduate program at Hunter College, New York.

== Career and films ==
Feder's career has had a focus on the trans community and trans justice. Feder stated in an interview with Megan McFarland of Salon, "I think I began to make films in my early twenties because I felt so alienated,". Feder has said in interviews that the images they saw in films and shows influenced their idea of trans people. Feder has spent their career since then making films about, and with, trans people. Specifically, when working on Disclosure, Feder prioritized hiring trans people. Whenever that was not possible, the cisgender person would be asked to mentor a fellow trans crewmember.

Feder's short films include the 2009 film No More Lies, the 2010 film Billy: A Portrait Of A Dancer, the 2010 film This All Happened Already, and the 2019 film When The Dust Settles.

Feder's films include the 2006 feature Boy I Am, exploring tensions in lesbian communities around trans men coming out,; the 2013 film Kate Bornstein is a Queer & Pleasant Danger, profiling the groundbreaking trans activist Kate Bornstein; the documentary film Disclosure: Trans Lives on Screen, exploring Hollywood's depiction of transgender people, and what impact those depictions have had on both the transgender community itself and American culture as a whole; and the 2025 documentary Heightened Scrutiny, featuring trans ACLU attorney Chase Strangio preparing to argue before the U.S. Supreme Court in United States v. Skrmetti.

Feder was given a James Aronson Award for Social Justice Journalism in 2015 for the film Kate Bornstein is a Queer & Pleasant Danger. The Advocate also named Kate Bornstein is a Queer and Pleasant Danger one of the best documentaries in 2014.

Feder's film Disclosure: Trans Lives on Screen premiered at the 2020 Sundance Film Festival and was released on Netflix the same year. The film explores the representation of trans people in contemporary film. The New York Times reviewed the film positively, calling it "a sweeping examination of how transgender people have been depicted in film and TV, from the silent era to The Arsenio Hall Show to Pose. The film later won the Outstanding Documentary award at the 32nd GLAAD Media Awards in 2021, which Feder and executive producer Laverne Cox accepted. Disclosure also received a nomination for the Peabody Awards.

Feder's films have been supported by many organizations, including the Jerome Foundation, Perspective Fund, Threshold, IFP Film Week, MacDowell Colony, and the Yaddo artist residency.

== See also ==
- List of transgender film and television directors
