= Emmett Schelling =

American transgender rights activist and nonprofit executive

- Occupations: Nonprofit executive; Transgender rights activist
- Organization: Executive Director of the Transgender Education Network of Texas
- Awards: Time 100 2022

Emmett Schelling is a South Korean-born American transgender rights activist and nonprofit executive who has served as the Executive Director of the Transgender Education Network of Texas since 2017. He previously served as the President of the San Antonio Gender Association from 2016 to 2017. He was named one of the Time 100 in 2022.

== Biography ==
He was born in Seoul, but was adopted and raised in Ohio and in Michigan in a very rural area. He frequently shares a story about how when he was 3 or 4, his sister tried to curl his hair and put him in a dress and he wound up burning his head from trying to escape the curling iron. He has also stated that he's cut his hair short since he was 9 or 10, first with scissors. He has discussed how he grew up in a mostly evangelical, rural, Christian community, and was involved in the Young Republicans in his youth. He felt afraid to come out as a transgender man for fear of his life and safety during his childhood.

He studied business management and marketing in college, and at one point did an internship as an associate youth pastor and ministry research fellow. He then worked in corporate management, and moved to San Antonio in 2015. He served as president of the San Antonio Gender Association from 2016 to 2017.

That same year, he became a full-time activist, and in 2017, he took on the role of Executive Director of the Transgender Education Network of Texas, the largest transgender and genderdiverse advocacy group in Texas. He was the first ever person of color to serve as executive director, and immediately worked on making the board more diverse.

As executive director, he handles a grueling schedule of long hours advocating against anti-transgender bills in the Texas state legislature and advocating for queer rights, healthcare access, and gender equity, among other things, in varying settings.

He was named to the Time 100 in 2022 for his transgender rights advocacy in Texas: his profile was written by Chase Strangio.
