= World of Wakanda =

Comic book spin-off of Marvel's Black Panther

- Issue #1 cover

Publication information
- Publisher: Marvel Comics
- Schedule: monthly
- Genre: Superhero
- Publication date: Jan. 2017-June 2017
- No. of issues: 6
- Main character(s): Ayo, Aneka

Creative team
- Written by: Roxane Gay (issues #1-5); Yona Harvey (issue #1); Rembert Browne (issue #6)
- Artist: Afua Richardson (covers)
- Penciller(s): Alitha E. Martinez (issues #1-5); Joe Bennett (issue #6)
- Inker: Robert Poggi
- Letterer: Joe Sabino
- Colorist(s): Rachelle Rosenberg; Tamra Bonvillain
- Editor: Wil Moss

Collected editions
- Black Panther: World of Wakanda: ISBN 978-1-302-90650-4

Black Panther: World of Wakanda is a comic book series and a spin-off from the Marvel Comics Black Panther title. It published six issues before being canceled. The series was primarily written by Roxane Gay, with poet Yona Harvey contributing a story to the first issue. Alitha E. Martinez drew the majority of the art for the series, for which Afua Richardson contributed cover art to the first five issues, as well as art for a short story in the first issue. Gay and Harvey became the first two black women to author a series for Marvel; counting Martinez and Richardson, upon its debut the series itself was helmed entirely by black women. Ta-Nehisi Coates served as a consultant for the series.

Black Panther: World of Wakanda won a 2018 Eisner Award for Best Limited Series. The series also won a 2018 GLAAD Media Award for Outstanding Comic Book.

== Publication history ==
After the success of the Black Panther series relaunch in April 2016, written by Ta-Nehisi Coates, Marvel developed a companion piece set in the fictional African country of Wakanda, home to the Black Panther. Coates recommended Gay and Harvey to pen the series. He had seen Gay read a short story about zombies two years earlier that he recalled as "the most surprising, unexpected, coolest zombie story you ever want to see"; Harvey had been his classmate at Howard University and he felt her skills as a poet would lend themselves to the comic-book form, telling The New York Times, "That's just so little space, and you have to speak with so much power. I thought she'd be a natural."

The series debuted November 9, 2016 (with a cover date of January 2017). Harvey wrote a 10-page origin story for Wakanda's revolutionary leader Zenzi, and has said she drew on the example of Winnie Mandela as inspiration. Gay has mentioned the character of Olivia Pope in the first season of Scandal and the original USA version of La Femme Nikita as influences for the series.

The series was canceled after six issues due to poor sales.

== Overview ==
The first World of Wakanda story arc (issues #1-5) features Ayo and Aneka, two Wakandan members of the Dora Milaje, the Black Panther's female security force. Ayo and Aneka are also lovers. The first storyline also describes Zenzi, a revolutionary and villain in the Black Panther series.

The first issue is a prequel to Coates's Black Panther series, describing the backstory of women in Wakanda. Captain Aneka of the Dora Milaje must deal with an impertinent new recruit who simultaneously challenges her and fascinates her. Meanwhile, Zenzi discovers that she has enhanced abilities and has to decide the best way to use them. Contrasting World of Wakanda with its Black Panther predecessor, Caitlin Rosberg writes at The A.V. Club that "World Of Wakanda feels more intimate, and all the more powerful for it. It's deeply invested in the identities of black women both as characters and more importantly as creators, making it clear that these aren't just background characters in T'Challa's [Black Panther's] life." Writing for Inverse magazine, Caitlin Busch called the first installment "a tear-jerking love story for the ages, encapsulating all the emotion, romance, tragedy, and fearsome intelligence of Black Panthers Wakandan civilization."

As the story moves along, Aneka and Ayo grow closer, but concerns over the righteousness of T'Challa's priorities lead them to leave the sisterhood. Aneka is conflicted about making her relationship with Ayo more public, but she agrees to take a vacation trip together. Folami tries to cause trouble for the Dora Milaje, but Queen Ramonda rebuffs her attempt and alerts Zola. Aneka and Ayo cut their trip short when they are summoned back to Wakanda. They become estranged when they return from their vacation to find that Shuri has been killed. Aneka takes on a solo mission to rescue women from an evil chieftain, and she is forced to kill him. She is arrested, and Folami, the chieftain's daughter, vows revenge. The women of Wakanda rise up to object to Aneka's imprisonment, and the Dora Milaje take a more active role in peacekeeping. Folami threatens Ayo and eventually kills Mistress Zola. Ayo breaks Aneka out of prison and the two vow to remain together and to fight injustice as the masked Midnight Angels.

The series' final issue, #6, is a standalone story by Rembert Browne and Joe Bennett about Kasper Cole and White Tiger.
