= Difficult Women (book) =

2017 short story collection by Roxane Gay

- Author: Roxane Gay
- Language: English
- Genre: Short fiction
- Publisher: Grove
- Publication date: January 3, 2017
- Publication place: United States
- Pages: 272
- ISBN: 978-0-8021-2539-2

Difficult Women is a 2017 short story collection by Roxane Gay.

== Content ==
In Vogue, Julia Fesenthal characterized Difficult Women as "a misogynist's taxonomy of the opposite sex. On the narrator's short list: loose women, frigid women, crazy women, mothers, and, finally, dead girls," depicted in stories "woven through with strands of magical realism."

== Development and publication ==
Gay has described being challenged by publishers in the development of the collection owing to the difficult material the book covers. Speaking at the Los Angeles Times Festival of Books, Gay recounted, "Editors said, 'we love [Difficult Women] but it makes me want to kill myself.'"

Grove Press published the 272-page collection on January 3, 2017.

== Reception ==
Difficult Women received favorable reviews from critics. Reviewing the collection in The Washington Post, Megan Mayhew Bergman said Gay's "real gift to readers in Difficult Women is her ability to marry her well-known intellectual concerns with good storytelling." In USA Today, Jaleesa M. Jones gave Difficult Women four (of four) stars, noting Gay's "deft touch with how ... intersecting identities mold and shape women’s experiences."

In 2018, Difficult Women was a finalist for the Lambda Literary Award for Lesbian Fiction and longlisted for the Aspen Words Literary Prize.
