= Yona Harvey =

American poet (born 1974)

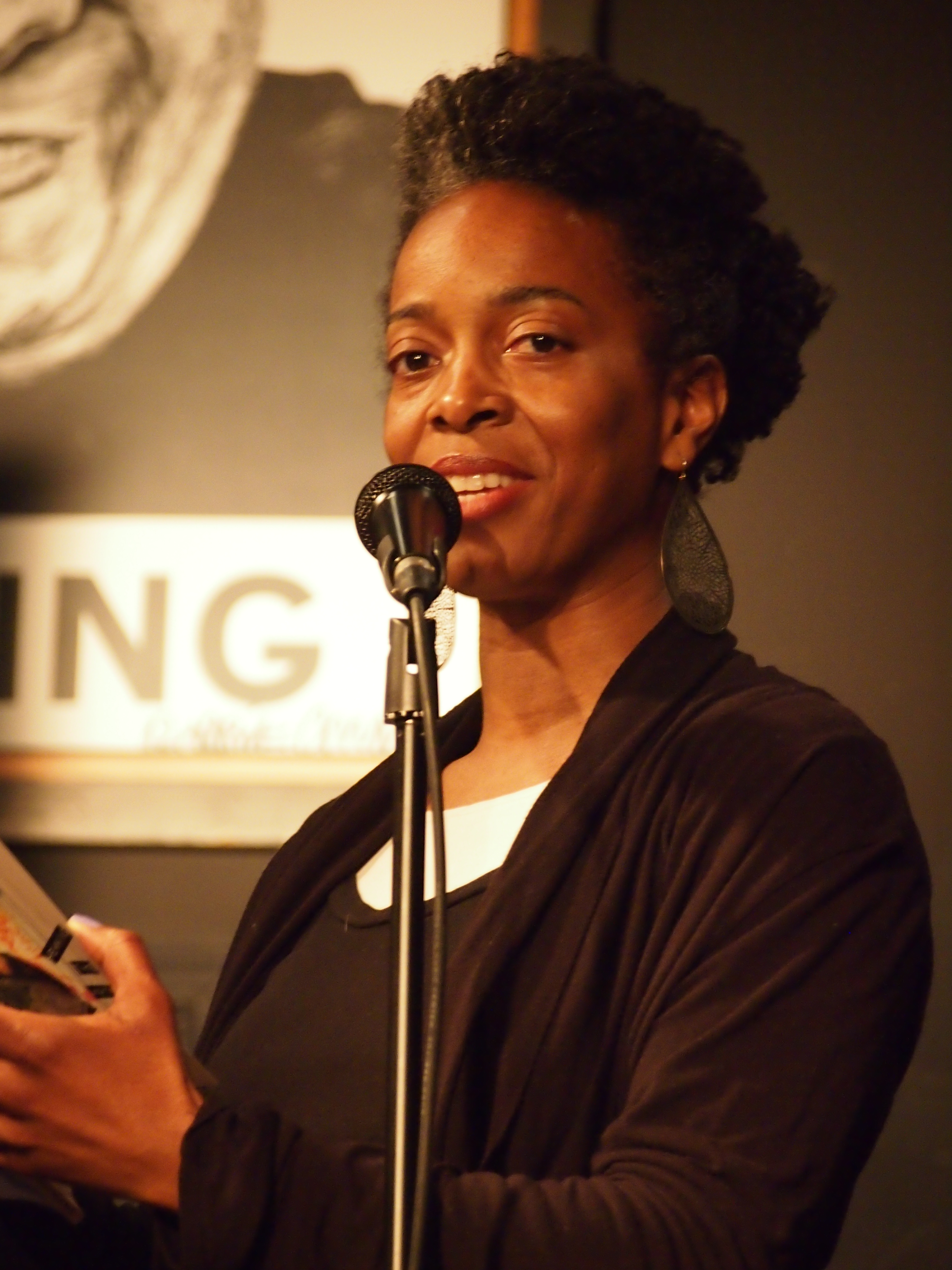
- Harvey at Busboys and Poets, 2014
- Born: 1974 (age 51–52); Cincinnati, Ohio, United States
- Education: Howard University; Ohio State University; University of Pittsburgh
- Occupations: Poet; Professor
- Writing career
- Notable work: Hemming the Water
- Notable awards: Kate Tufts Discovery Award
- Website: www.yonaharvey.com

Yona Harvey (born 1974) is an American poet and assistant professor at University of Pittsburgh. She won the 2014 Kate Tufts Discovery Award. She is also an author of Marvel Comics' World of Wakanda, becoming one of the first two black women writing for Marvel.

== Early life ==
Harvey received her undergraduate degree in English from Howard University, where her classmates included writer Ta-Nehesi Coates, playwright Kemp Powers, and poet Doug Kearney. She went on to receive a graduate degree in English from Ohio State University and a Master of Library and Information Science degree from the University of Pittsburgh.

== Career ==
=== Poetry ===
Harvey's work has appeared in jubilat, Ploughshares, Gulf Coast, Callaloo, and West Branch.

Harvey published her first poetry collection, Hemming the Water, with Four Way Books in 2013. She won 2014 Kate Tufts Discovery Award for the collection and was named a finalist for 2014 Hurston/Wright Legacy Award in poetry. Reviewing Hemming the Water in the Pittsburgh City Paper, Mike Schneider said: "At her best — such as 'Rose Lassi' — Harvey creates a feeling of something put together as well as the best machines that sew and sing, every word a necessary part of the whole humming beauty." In the Asterix Journal, Lauren Russell wrote of the collection that its "shiftiness is Harvey’s particular genius. In poems that weave tenderness and violence, the expectation and the surprise, Harvey thwarts the grand cliché even as she courts it, stitching together a polyphony of voices, visions and songs in a patchwork too slippery for any matinee idol to wear."

Harvey is the Tammis Day Professor of Poetry at Smith College. She was previously an assistant professor at the University of Pittsburgh. She teaches in the English department's writing program; her teaching deals with African and disaporic literature and culture, digital and new media, poetry and lyric essays, and multimodal composition. She is on the faculty for The Frost Place's 2017 Conference on Poetry.

=== Artist statement ===
Harvey has described her artistic interest as spanning genres to express "the diverse lives and experiences of Black American women through literature...the visibility and invisibility of Black women, our mental health and self-care, and the evidence of our imaginations in society as manifested in our hair, clothing, speech, parenting, decisions not to parent, and interactions with other women."

=== Comics ===
Harvey wrote her first comic, an issue of "Flatbush Maiden", as an undergraduate.

In 2016, Harvey became a writer for the Marvel Comics series World of Wakanda, a spinoff of the Black Panther series; she and Roxane Gay are the first two black women to write for Marvel. Ta-Nehisi Coates, who initially connected Gay and Harvey with the Marvel franchise, said that he recommended Harvey because he felt her skill in poetry would translate well to the short-form storytelling necessary in successful comics: "That’s just so little space, and you have to speak with so much power. I thought she’d be a natural." Harvey contributed an origin story for World of Wakanda's revolutionary leader Zenzi, and has said she was inspired by the example of Winnie Mandela.

Harvey and Coates wrote another companion to the Black Panther series, called Black Panther & The Crew, set in Harlem. That series was canceled due to slow sales and ran for six issues.

=== Forthcoming projects ===
Harvey is completing a second poetry manuscript and also working on a memoir about her younger sister's struggles with depression.

== Personal life ==
Harvey is now divorced from Terrance Hayes; the two met at a Cave Canem retreat for black poets in 1996. They have two children, a son and daughter.

Harvey's sister died at the hospital where she went in search of psychiatric help.

== Works ==
- Hemming the Water, Four Way Books 2013, ISBN 9781935536321
- The Subject of Retreat (poem, 2015)
- Hurricane (poem, 2013)
- Gingivitis, Notes on Fear (poem, 2013)
- Selected poems via Washingtonart.com
- Selected poems via Bucknell.edu
- Her work has been anthologized in A Poet's Craft: A Comprehensive Guide to Making and Sharing Your Poetry and The Force of What's Possible: Accessibility and the Avant - Garde.

== Awards ==
- Winner, 2014 Kate Tufts Discovery Award
- Finalist, 2014 Hurston/Wright Legacy Award, Poetry
- Winner, 2016 Carol R. Brown Creative Achievement Awards, Established Artist, from the Pittsburgh Foundation and the Heinz Endowments
- Individual Artist grant in nonfiction from The Pittsburgh Foundation
