= Heightened Scrutiny (film) =

2025 documentary film

- Directed by: Sam Feder
- Produced by: Sam Feder; Amy Scholder; Paola Mendoza
- Starring: Chase Strangio
- Cinematography: Martin DiCicco; Mariam Dwedar
- Edited by: Emelie Mahdavian
- Music by: Jonathan Sanford
- Distributed by: Fourth Act Film
- Release date: January 27, 2025 (Sundance Film Festival)
- Running time: 89 minutes
- Country: USA
- Language: English

Heightened Scrutiny is a 2025 documentary film directed by Sam Feder. The film follows Chase Strangio, lawyer for the American Civil Liberties Union (ACLU), as he becomes the first openly transgender person to argue before the US Supreme Court. Strangio represented the plaintiffs in the case United States v. Skrmetti, arguing that a Tennessee state law banning access to gender-affirming healthcare violated the Equal Protection Clause of the 14th Amendment.

In addition to Strangio, the film features interviews with trans actors and activists Elliot Page, Laverne Cox, and Peppermint, trans media executive Gina Chua, journalist and Columbia Journalism School dean Jelani Cobb, and other media figures. Cox also served as one of the executive producers.

The documentary premiered at the 2025 Sundance Film Festival. It was nominated for Outstanding Documentary at the 37th GLAAD Media Awards.
