= Iowa Brown and Black Forum =

The Iowa Brown & Black Presidential Forum is a presidential forum in the state of Iowa. Its stated purpose is for "all candidates [to] have the opportunity to answer essential concerns of African-Americans and Latinos." It is recognized as the oldest continuous minority forum for presidential candidates in America and one of the longest-running presidential forums in the nation.

== Founding ==
The forum was founded in 1984 by Mary E. Domniguez Campos, and former Iowa Representative Wayne Ford. The two recognized that their communities were not being addressed by presidential candidates, seemingly not counting in the election process, and wanted to create a non-partisan event that would result in the Iowa caucuses being more inclusive of all Iowans. The forum aims to garner attention for the issues that Latinos and African Americans throughout Iowa, and the United States, face on a daily basis. It also hopes to help close gaps in the voting process by educating these groups, and ultimately motivating them to participate in the political process.

== Key years ==
The first forum, in which candidates pledged to help end discrimination, took place in 1984 and was held at the Tiny Tot Child Care Center with John Glenn, Gary Hart, Alan Cranston and George McGovern participating in the event. Both 1992 and 1996 were standout years in that the 1992 event only featured one participant, Senator Tom Harkin, who was known as the favorite-son candidate, and the 1996 event did not go on as President Bill Clinton was running unopposed for renomination, and Republican candidates chose not to participate.

In 2000, the event was broadcast live nationwide by MSNBC and featured Al Gore and Bill Bradley. The fifth forum took place in 2004 with Democratic candidates Ambassador Carol Moseley Braun, Governor Howard Dean, Senator John Edwards, Representative Dick Gephardt, Senator John Kerry, Senator Joe Lieberman, Representative Dennis Kucinich, and Reverend Al Sharpton. And, in 2007, with a live telecast by HDnet and Mediacom, delayed showing on Iowa Public Television and live worldwide broadcast via Sirius Satellite Radio, the event featured then-Senator Barack Obama, then-Senator Joe Biden, then-Senator Hillary Clinton, Senator Chris Dodd, Senator John Edwards, Senator Mike Gravel, Representative Dennis Kucinich, and Governor Bill Richardson participated. The event also featured a new element that brought a debate-like feel to the forum: candidates were allowed to pose one question to another candidate.

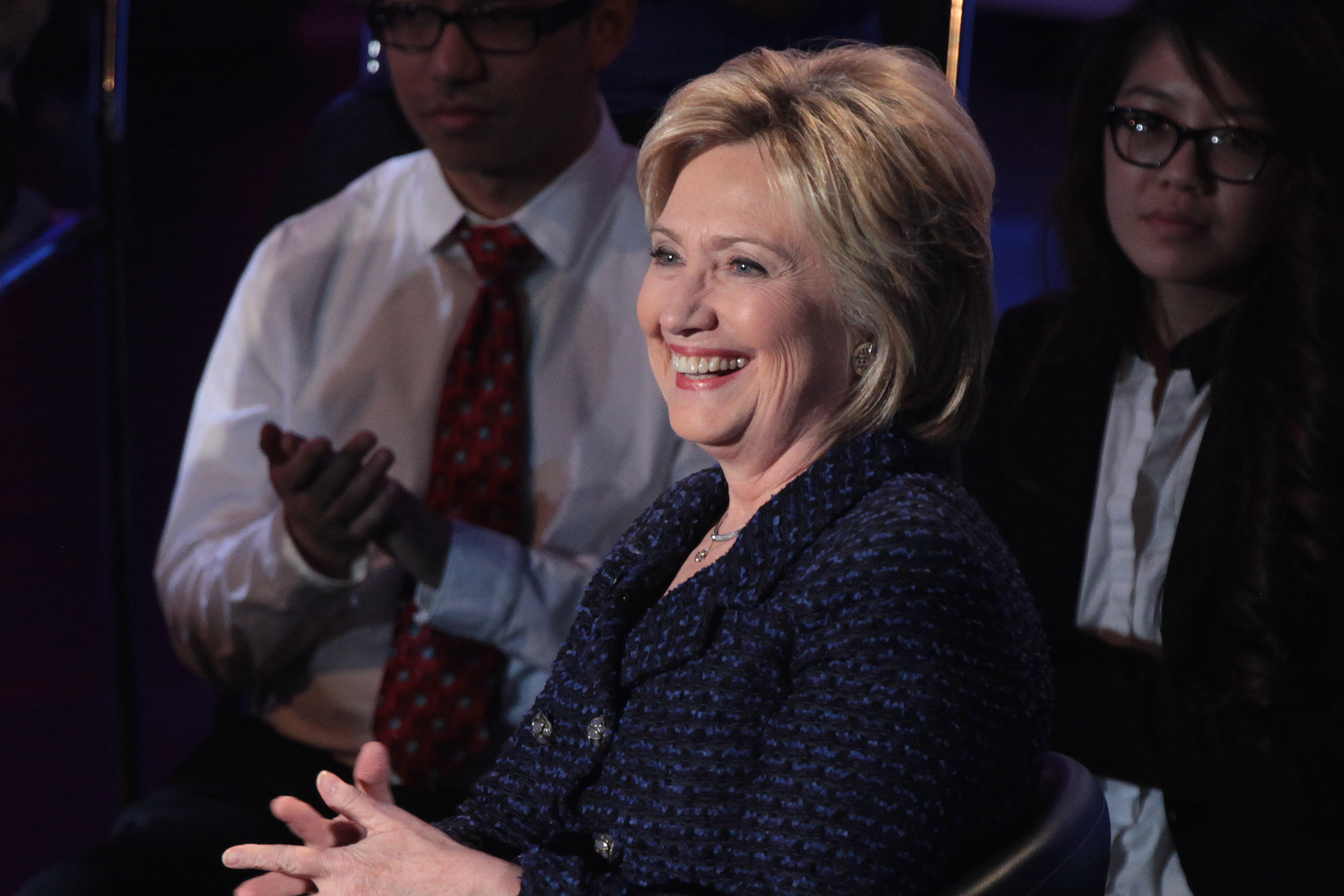
Hillary Clinton at the Forum in 2016

=== 2016 ===
The 2016 Brown & Black Democratic Presidential Forum was broadcast live on January 11, 2016. at 8 p.m. ET on Fusion, a joint venture between the Disney-ABC Television Group and Univision Communications. Participating in the event are Democratic hopefuls Hillary Clinton, Martin O'Malley and Bernie Sanders. Jorge Ramos, a 2015 Time 100 honoree, led the discussion alongside co-moderators Alicia Menendez, Rembert Browne and Akilah Hughes. The forum focused on five key issues areas including: social justice, the economy, education, healthcare and immigration. The forum was also broadcast on Iowa Public Television on January 13, 2016, at 9 p.m. CT.

=== 2020 ===
The 2020 Brown & Black Democratic Presidential Forum was streamed live on January 20, 2020 at 1pm ET on VICE media's Facebook page. The event brought Democratic hopefuls Pete Buttigieg, Joe Biden, Elizabeth Warren, Bernie Sanders, Amy Klobuchar, Andrew Yang, John Delaney, and Senator Michael Bennet together in Des Moines, Iowa. The discussion was led by co-moderators Dexter Thomas and Zo Slade. The forum was also broadcast on VICE's TV network.
