= Chase Strangio =

American lawyer and activist (born 1982)

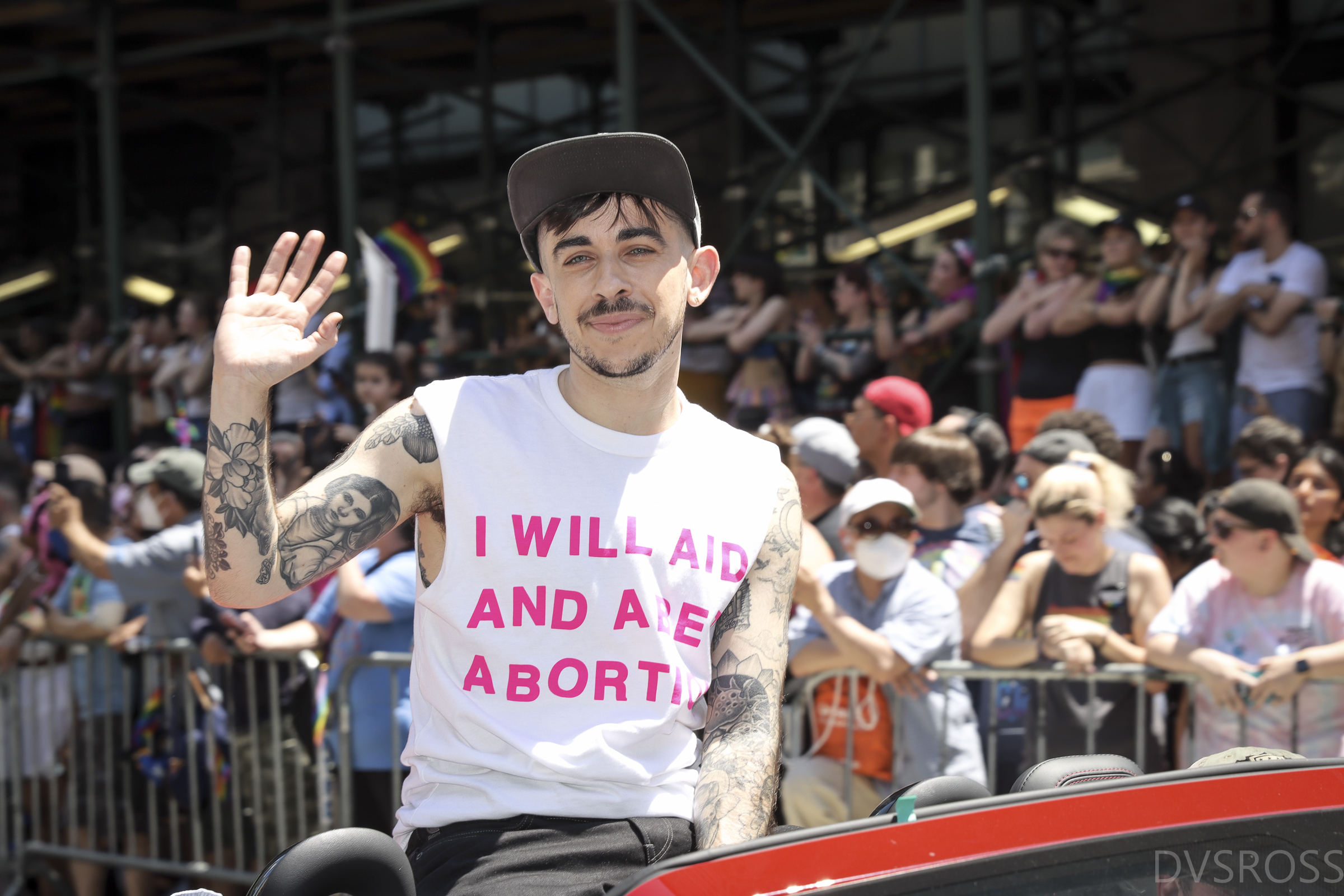
- Strangio in 2022
- Born: October 29, 1982 (age 43)
- Education: Grinnell College (BA); Northeastern University (JD)
- Employer: American Civil Liberties Union
- Known for: Transgender rights activism
- Partner: Kimberly Drew
- Children: 1

Chase Strangio (/strænˈdʒiːoʊ/ born October 29, 1982) is an American lawyer and transgender rights activist. He is the deputy director for transgender justice and staff attorney with the American Civil Liberties Union (ACLU). He is the first known transgender person to make oral arguments before the Supreme Court of the United States.

== Early life and education ==
Strangio grew up in a Jewish family in Newton, Massachusetts, just outside of Boston, Massachusetts. When Strangio was in tenth grade, his parents, Joan and Mark, divorced. His father was soon remarried. His mother worked as a social worker and stayed in the family house. He attended Newton North High School and played on the soccer team. Strangio realized he was queer in high school, and graduated in 2000.

Strangio gained early admission to Williams College, but left after orientation and spent time working in Ohio near Oberlin College. He then enrolled at Grinnell College in Iowa, where he graduated in 2004 with a degree in history. While in college, he studied radical political aims and was critical of mainstream LGBTQ legal priorities.

After college, Strangio worked as a paralegal at GLBTQ Legal Advocates & Defenders in Boston before attending Northeastern University School of Law, where he focused on social justice. He interned at the Urban Justice Center's Peter Cicchino Youth Project in New York City, working with homeless queer and transgender youth. Strangio came out as a transgender man while in law school, and graduated in 2010.

After graduating from Northeastern in 2010, Strangio took a job with the Sylvia Rivera Law Project, where he worked on cases for gender-nonconforming clients.

== Career and activism ==
After law school, Strangio received a fellowship at the Sylvia Rivera Law Project (SRLP), providing legal services to low-income transgender, intersex, and gender non-conforming people. Strangio and trans activist Lorena Borjas co-founded the Lorena Borjas Community Fund in 2012 to provide bail and bond assistance to trans people.

Strangio began working for the American Civil Liberties Union (ACLU) in 2013. He then became a lead counsel for US soldier Chelsea Manning in her lawsuit against the Department of Defense for access to gender-affirming medical treatment while in custody after she came out as transgender in 2013. In 2015, he won Manning's case against the U.S. Army and as a result, it was required to pay for Manning's hormone therapy in prison. Strangio co-organized a fundraiser for Manning which raised over $120,000 for her release. He wrote to President Barack Obama in 2016 requesting Manning’s release, with most of her sentence commuted the following year. He was also part of the team in 2015, suing on behalf of a trans high school student Gavin Grimm, who was denied access to the boys' restrooms at his school.

He worked on Obergefell v. Hodges, in which the US Supreme Court ruled in 2015 that every state must allow same-sex marriage. After joining the ACLU, media coverage about Strangio increased with high profile cases such as Manning, as well as from fighting the Trump administration’s ban on transgender military service members and during the national debate over bathroom bills, like North Carolina's HB 2. In this case, he objected to messaging that described trans women as "born male" or "born with a male body", arguing instead that a trans woman is born a woman.

In October 2019, Strangio was one of the lawyers representing Aimee Stephens, a trans woman who was fired from her job at a funeral home, in the U.S. Supreme Court case R.G. & G.R. Harris Funeral Homes Inc. v. Equal Employment Opportunity Commission. Those oral arguments were heard alongside Bostock v. Clayton County, on which Strangio was also a lawyer. The previous month, trans actress Laverne Cox brought Strangio as her date to the 2019 Emmy Awards, and the pair spoke to reporters on the red carpet about the upcoming court case.

In June 2020, the U.S. Supreme Court decided 6–3 in favor of Gerald Bostock, a gay man terminated from his job due to discrimination on the basis of sexual orientation, in Bostock v. Clayton County. The court ruled that it is illegal to discriminate in employment on the basis of transgender identity or sexual orientation.

In November 2020, journalist Glenn Greenwald criticized Strangio's comments about the book Irreversible Damage: The Transgender Craze Seducing Our Daughters by Abigail Shrier. Strangio, who had tweeted that "stopping the circulation of this book and these ideas is 100% a hill I will die on," responded that he was not speaking for the ACLU and said he deleted his tweet because "there were relentless calls to have me fired, which I found exhausting as I was navigating work and childcare." According to the New York Times, Strangio's tweet had "startled traditional backers [of the ACLU], who remembered its many fights against book censorship and banning".

Strangio has appeared on television programs including The Rachel Maddow Show, Democracy Now!, For the Record with Greta, AM Joy, PBS NewsHour, and Up.

Since 2021, Strangio has worked with the ACLU to fight against state legislation seeking to prohibit children from accessing treatment for gender transition. On December 4, 2024, he became the first known transgender person to make oral arguments before the Supreme Court of the United States in United States v. Skrmetti, a case brought to challenge a Tennessee law prohibiting certain forms of gender-affirming care (including puberty blockers and hormone therapy) for transgender minors. In the days ahead of oral arguments, Strangio published an op-ed in The New York Times describing how having access to the forms of gender-affirming medical care prohibited by the Tennessee law saved his own life. In June 2025, the Supreme Court held that the Tennessee state law banning puberty blockers and hormone therapy for the treatment of gender dysphoria in minors did not violate the Equal Protection Clause of the Fourteenth Amendment to the United States Constitution.

In 2025, a documentary by Sam Feder featuring Strangio, Heightened Scrutiny, premiered at the Sundance Film Festival. The film documents Strangio's work on the United States v. Skrmetti case.

== Views ==
Strangio has described himself as "a constitutional lawyer who fundamentally doesn't believe in the Constitution." He has called civil marriage "a fundamentally violent institution." Strangio disagrees with the idea that transgender women could be born with a male body, saying there is no such thing as a "male body" and that "A penis is not a male body part. It's just an unusual body part for a woman."

== Honors and recognition ==
In 2014, Strangio was named to the Trans 100 list for "outstanding contributions to the trans community".

In June 2017, Strangio was one of those chosen for NBC Out's inaugural "#Pride30" list.

In May 2018, Strangio was awarded an honorary Doctor of Laws by his alma mater Grinnell College.

In November 2019, he was awarded the American Bar Association's Commission on Sexual Orientation and Gender Identity's 2020 Stonewall Award.

Strangio was included in 2020's Time 100 most influential people in the world. He wrote the 2022 Time 100 entry for Emmett Schelling.

== Personal life ==
His partner is the art curator and writer Kimberly Drew (as of 2021). As of 2022, Strangio lives in New York City and has one child.
