= The Paideia School =

Private school in Atlanta, Georgia, United States

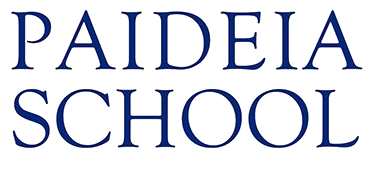

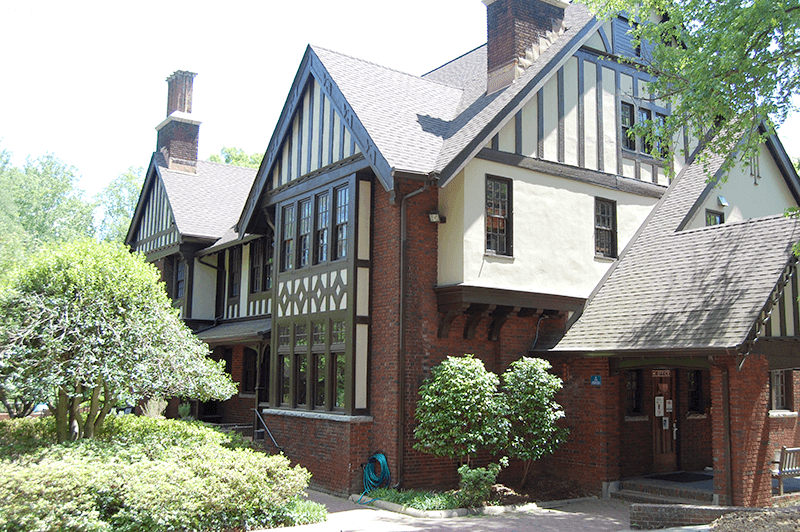

Location
- 1509 Ponce de Leon Avenue; Atlanta, Georgia 30307; United States; 33.77337°N 84.33796°W

Information
- Type: Private
- Founded: 1971; 55 years ago
- School code: 110214
- Dean: Elementary: Elissa Harrison; Junior high: Jennifer Cox; High school: Stacey Winston
- Headmaster: Tom E. Taylor
- Teaching staff: 107.9 (FTE) (2021–22)
- Grades: PK–12
- Gender: Co-educational
- Enrollment: 986 (2021–22)
- Average class size: 16 (high school)
- Student to teacher ratio: 9 (2021–22)
- Language: English
- Hours in school day: 6.8
- Campus size: Main: 16 acres Python Park: 12 acres
- Campus type: Open
- Colors: Blue and white
- Song: "O Mascot of Might"
- Mascot: Python
- Team name: Pythons
- Tuition: Half day, ages 3-5 - $13,143; Elementary, ages 5-12 - $26,835; Junior high, grades 7-8 - $30,030; High school, grades 9-11 - $30,102; High School, grade 12 - $30,378
- Website: paideiaschool.org

The Paideia School (/ˌpaɪˈdeɪ.ə/) is a private independent school in the Druid Hills neighborhood of Atlanta, Georgia, United States. It enrolls children ages 3 through 18.

== Founding ==
In November 1970, when there was a rush among southern communities to open segregation academies to fight federally mandated integration of the public schools, a group got together to found a less-segregated private school. The founders planned to open a school in September 1971, but they didn't have a location or any students. Their headmaster was only 25 and had no experience in administrations. The Paideia School opened for the fall semester in 1971 with 145 students in a building at 1509 Ponce de Leon in Druid Hills.

== Alumni ==
- Sarah Bianchi, Deputy United States Trade Representative
- Rembert Browne, a writer who primarily focuses on pop culture, politics and sports
- Tommy Dorfman, an American actress known for her work in the Netflix series 13 Reasons Why
- Alisha Kramer, an American doctor and health activist
- Jon Ossoff, U.S. senator from Georgia since 2021
- Daniel Platzman, an American songwriter, composer, and the drummer for the pop rock band Imagine Dragons
- Bex Taylor-Klaus, an American actor known for their work in Arrow, Scream, and Voltron: Legendary Defender
