= Tiny Hardcore Press =

Illinois-based small press

- Founded: 2010
- Founder: Roxane Gay
- Country of origin: United States
- Headquarters location: Charleston, Illinois
- Publication types: Books
- Official website: Was tinyhardcorepress.com

Tiny Hardcore Press is an Illinois-based small press (a micro-press) founded by Roxane Gay, who was an Assistant Professor of English at Eastern Illinois University, and co-edits the literary magazine PANK. Tiny Hardcore Press's first title, Normally Special by pseudonymous author xTx, is in its fifth printing, and has received reviews from, among other places, The Nervous Breakdown and the literary blog Bookslut.

Other titles from Tiny Hardcore Press include So You Know It's Me (2011) by Brian Oliu, Please Don't Be Upset (2011) by Brandi Wells, Steal Me for Your Stories (2012) by Robb Todd, and The Map of the System of Human Knowledge (2012) by James Tadd Adcox. In addition, Tiny Hardcore has published two anthologies of chapbooks, featuring work by Lauren Becker, Erin Fitzgerald, Tyler Gobble, Kirsty Logan, Christopher Newgent, Brian Oliu, Michelle Reale, and Amber Sparks.

When asked to describe the press, Roxane Gay has said in an interview that it is "tiny enough to be so adorable you can't help but sigh happily when you think of it", and "hardcore enough to make you want to look away but you can't so you keep staring and feeling that terrible thrilling tension winding itself through you".

In January 2012 Gay published an essay in the literary blog HTML Giant about starting and running a small press like Tiny Hardcore.
