= Bad Feminist =

2014 collection of essays by Roxane Gay

- First edition
- Author: Roxane Gay
- Language: English
- Subject: Essays
- Genre: Nonfiction
- Publisher: Harper Perennial
- Publication place: United States
- Media type: Print, ebook
- Pages: 336 pp
- ISBN: 978-0062282712

Bad Feminist: Essays is a 2014 collection of essays by cultural critic, novelist and professor Roxane Gay. Bad Feminist explores being a feminist while loving things that could seem at odds with feminist ideology. Gay's essays engage pop culture and her personal experiences, covering topics such as the Sweet Valley High series, Django Unchained, and Gay's own upbringing as a Haitian-American.

== Publication history ==
Bad Feminist was one of two books published by Gay in 2014, the other being her novel An Untamed State.

== Content ==
The essays in Bad Feminist address a wide variety of topics, both cultural and personal. The collection of essays is broken into five sections: Me; Gender & Sexuality; Race & Entertainment; Politics, Gender & Race; and Back to Me. In a 2014 interview with Time, Gay explained her role as a feminist and how it has influenced her writing: "In each of these essays, I'm very much trying to show how feminism influences my life for better or worse. It just shows what it's like to move through the world as a woman. It's not even about feminism per se, it’s about humanity and empathy."

== Reception ==
Bad Feminist was widely reviewed. Gay drew praise for her "wry and delightful voice."

The Boston Globe wrote that "there is much to admire", such as her "insightful" essay "What We Hunger For"; Bad Feminist "signals an important contribution to the complicated terrain of gender politics." The Huffington Post was more effusive in its praise – "Gay's essays expertly weld her personal experiences with broader gender trends occurring politically and in popular culture" – and gave the book an 8/10 rating. The Boston Review wrote that "Bad Feminist surveys culture and politics from the perspective of one of the most astute critics writing today." In the United Kingdom's The Guardian, critic Kira Cochrane wrote: "While online discourse is often characterised by extreme, polarised opinions, her writing is distinct for being subtle and discursive, with an ability to see around corners, to recognise other points of view while carefully advancing her own. In print, on Twitter and in person, Gay has the voice of the friend you call first for advice, calm and sane as well as funny, someone who has seen a lot and takes no prisoners." Time dubbed Bad Feminist "a manual on how to be human" and called Gay the "gift that keeps on giving."

The New York Times Book Review wrote that Gay relied too heavily on an "unreasonable strawman" to make her point, and The Independent found that Gay's own contradictions within the book come off as "intellectually flimsy." The Chicago Tribune noted that while "Gay writes incisively, fearlessly, sometimes angrily, often wittily and always intelligently on an incredibly diverse array of issues: race, domestic violence, pop culture, food, social media, child sexual abuse, the Obamas and, of course, feminism" in her columns, Bad Feminist is somewhat lacking: "why, then, is there not more to admire in this collection of Gay's new and previously published essays? One problem is the aforementioned recapitulation of tried and true analyses, opinions and memes, any or all of which might bear reprising if Gay brought to them a new and original take."

The book was noted for its popularity in feminist circles, with the satirical site Reductress publishing a story about how someone was a bad feminist because they hadn't yet read Bad Feminist. A group of feminist scholars and activists analyzed Gay's Bad Feminist for "Short Takes: Provocations on Public Feminism", an initiative of the feminist journal Signs: Journal of Women in Culture and Society.
