= Afua Richardson =

American comic book artist (born 1980)

- Richardson at Dragon Con in 2026
- Born: April 25, 1980 (age 46) New York City, NY
- Areas: Writer, Penciller, Inker, Colourist
- Pseudonym: Docta Foo
- Notable works: Genius, World of Wakanda

Afua Richardson is an African-Native American artist. She did covers for five issues of Marvel's World of Wakanda and art for a short story backup in the first issue. Her comic, Genius, with writers Marc Bernardin and Adam Freeman won Top Cow's 2008 Pilot Season. She illustrated a Langston Hughes poem in 2014 for NPR's Black History Month, and did variant covers for several comic book titles including All Star Batman for DC comics, Attack on Titan for Kodansha, Mad Max for Vertigo, as well as covers/variant covers for X-Men '92, Totally Awesome Hulk, Shuri, and Captain America and the Mighty Avengers at Marvel Comics. She was one of a small group of African American women artists who were employed by the "big two" comic publishers at the time she entered the industry.

== Biography ==
Richardson was raised in New York City. From a family of scientists, she studied classical flute from age nine. As a flautist, she performed with ensembles at Carnegie Hall and on Soul Train. She also performed with Sheila E. and Parliament-Funkadelic.

She was a backup singer, a beatboxer, a background dancer on MTV Jams and appeared in an off-Broadway show with Melvin Van Peebles. She is part of the musical collective Future Soul Society, and recorded with Alexa Edmonds Lima under the name 'Afua & Alexa'.

Richardson is a self-trained artist. She was a member of the now defunct Ormes Society, which promoted African-American women in the comics industry.

For the comic book series, Genius (2007), she worked with writers Marc Bernardin and Adam Freeman to tell the story through the voice of a black woman, Destiny Ajaye. Richardson's experience of being a minority in the United States influenced her work. In Genius, she draws violent acts in a way that is both "matter-of-fact and highly stylized," according to ComicsAlliance. She portrays Ajaye's thought processes and David Brothers called it "instantly understandable and worthy of poring over."

== Awards ==
In 2011, Richardson received the Nina Simone Award for Artistic Achievement as one of the few African-American women comic book artists to work for the leading publishers in the field.

== Bibliography ==
=== Interior art ===
- World of Wakanda #1 (2017) (backup short story)

==== Top Cow ====
- Genius (2007)

=== Cover work ===
==== DC ====
- Warren Ellis' WildStorm #2 – Variant (2017)
- All Star Batman #1 – Variant (2016)

==== Marvel ====
- Captain Marvel #4 – Variant (2016)
- Totally Awesome Hulk #2 – Variant (2016)
- X-Men '92 #1 – Variant (2016)
- Captain America and the Mighty Avengers #14 – Variant (2015)
- World of Wakanda #1–#5 (2017)

==== Image ====
- Black Magick #3 – Variant (2016)

=== Other art ===
- Attack on Titan Anthology – Pinup (2016)
- Mad Max Fury Road Artist Book – Two-Page Spread (2016)
- The Negro Speaks of Rivers – Illustrations of the Langston Hughes Poem set to Narration for NPR (2014)
