= Alitha Martinez =

American comic book artist

Alitha E. Martinez
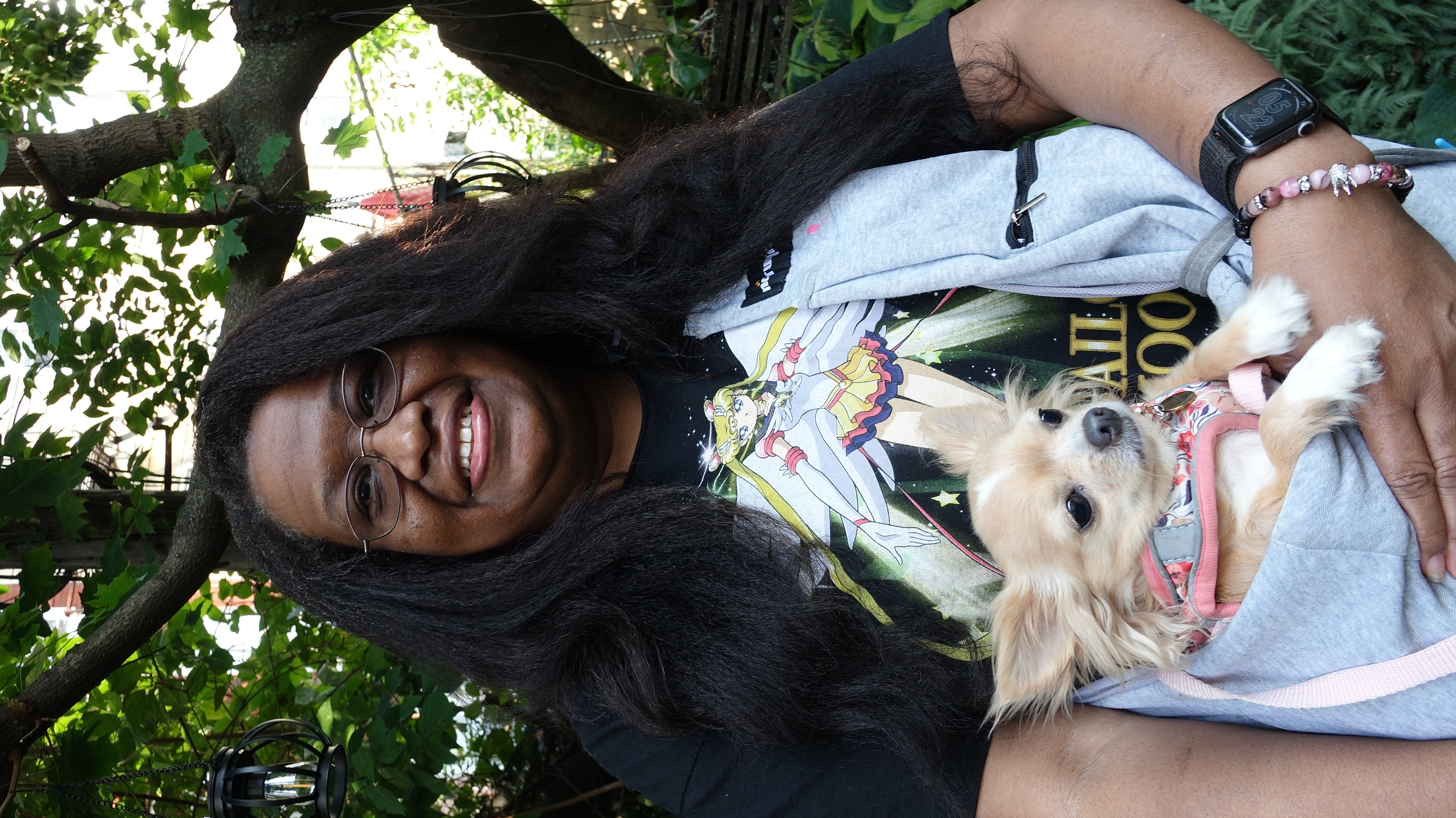
- Martinez in 2026
- Born: New York, United States
- Areas: Penciller, Inker
- Notable works: Iron Man; Heroes webcomics Black Panther: World of Wakanda
- Awards: Eisner Award (2018); GLAAD Media Award for Outstanding Comic Book (2018)

Alitha E. Martinez is an American comic book artist best known for her work on for Marvel Comics's Iron Man, the Heroes webcomics, and DC's Batgirl. Over the course of her career she has worked for all the major comic book publishers, including Marvel, DC Comics, Image Comics, and Archie Comics.

== Career ==
Martinez attended the School of Visual Arts in the mid-1990s. She has discussed the challenges she faced as often the only female student in her cartooning classes.

For much of the latter half of the 1990s, Martinez worked as a background assistant/inker for other creators, with her earliest known work being her 1993 contribution to the series Cable. Martinez counts 1999 as her big break in comics when she was working as an assistant to Marvel editor Joe Quesada. Via this connection, she became the lead artist on Iron Man, working on the book throughout 2000 and 2001.

After a series of short stints and one-shots for the next few years, Martinez became a regular artist on the Season 2 and Season 3 Heroes webcomics produced in 2008–2009 to supplement the popular television show of the same name.

Moving to DC Comics, Martinez co-created the villain Knightfall in Batgirl #10 (August 2012).

In recent years, she helped create the artwork, including cover art, for a special commemorative issue of Riverdale by Archie Comics. Martinez penciled most of the first five issues of World of Wakanda, a spin-off from the Marvel Comics' Black Panther title that was primarily written by Roxane Gay. In 2017, she was a guest artist for the limited series Lazarus X+66 from Image Comics, written by Greg Rucka. She also worked on five issues of Marvel Comics' Moon Girl And Devil Dinosaur.

In 2019, Martinez released the series Omni with writer Devin K. Grayson for the Humanoids Publishing comic line.

In 2020, art by Martinez was included in the exhibit Women in Comics: Looking Forward, Looking Back at the Society of Illustrators in New York City.

Martinez is on the faculty of the School of Visual Arts.

== Personal life ==
Martinez is of Honduran and Curaçao heritage. She has a son named Michael.

== Awards ==
- 2018 Eisner Award for Best Limited Series (World of Wakanda)
- 2018 GLAAD Media Award for Outstanding Comic Book

== Bibliography (selected) ==
=== Archie Comics ===
- New Crusaders issues #3–5 (2013) – with writer Ian Flynn
- Riverdale One-Shot (2017) – with writer Will Ewing
- Mighty Crusaders #1 (Dec. 2018) – with writer Ian Flynn

=== DC Comics ===
- Batgirl issues #7, 8, 10 (2012) – with writer Gail Simone
- Vertigo Quarterly CMYK #1 (2014) – with writer Amy Chu
- Represent: It's a Bird! (2020) — with writer Christian Cooper

=== Devil's Due Publishing ===
- Voltron: Defender of the Universe #9–11 (2004) – with writer Dan Jolley

=== Graphic Universe ===
- The Quest for Dragon Mountain: Book 16 (Twisted Journeys) (2010) – with writer Robin Mayhall

=== Heroes ===
- Faces, Part 1 (2008) – with writer Mark Sable
- Berlin parts 1 and 2 (2008) – with writer Christopher Zatta
- Hindsight (2008) – with writer Oliver Grigsby
- Foresight (2008) – with writer Zach Craley
- Dreams Unto Death (2008) – with writer Christopher Zatta
- The Sting of Injustice (2008) – with writer Christopher Zatta
- Viewpoints (2008) – with writer Chuck Kim
- The Caged Bird parts 1 and 2 (2008) – with writer Timm Keppler
- What We Have Wrought (2009) – with writer Joseph Robert Donnelly

=== Humanoids/H1 ===
- Omni issues #1–2 (2019) – with writer Devin K. Grayson

=== Image Comics ===
- Lazarus: X+66 #4 (2017) – with writers Greg Rucka and Eric Trautmann

=== Marvel Comics ===
- Cable 1999 (1999) – with writers Michael Higgins and Karl Bollers
- Iron Man issues #28–40 (2000–2001) – with writers Joe Quesada and Frank Tieri
- Marvel Age: Fantastic Four issues #3, 9, 10 (2005) – with writers Sean McKeever and Marc Sumerak
- Black Panther: World of Wakanda issues #1–5 (2017) – with writer Roxane Gay
- X-Men Gold Annual #1 (Mar. 2018) – with writers Marc Guggenheim and Leah Williams
- Moon Girl and Devil Dinosaur #26, #44–47 (2018–2019) – with writer Brandon Montclare

=== NBM/Papercutz ===
- WWE Slam City Comics (2014) – with writer Mathias Triton
- Papercutz Free Comic Book Day #11 (2016) – with writer Sarah Kuhn
