= Jackie Ormes =

American cartoonist (1911–1985)

- Jackie Ormes holding a Patty-Jo doll.
- Born: Zelda Mavin Jackson; August 1, 1911 Pittsburgh, Pennsylvania
- Died: December 26, 1985 (aged 74) Chicago, Illinois
- Area: Cartoonist
- Notable works: Torchy Brown in Dixie to Harlem; Candy; Patty Jo 'n' Ginger; Torchy in Heartbeats (originally titled Torchy Brown Heartbeats) and accompanying Torchy Togs (paper doll cutouts).
- Awards: National Association of Black Journalists Hall of Fame; Will Eisner Comic Industry Hall of Fame

Jackie Ormes (August 1, 1911 – December 26, 1985) was an American cartoonist. She is known as the first African-American woman cartoonist and creator of the Torchy Brown comic strip and the Patty-Jo 'n' Ginger panel.

== Early life and education ==
Jackie Ormes was born Zelda Mavin Jackson on August 1, 1911, in Pittsburgh, Pennsylvania, to parents William Winfield Jackson and Mary Brown Jackson. Her father William, the owner of a printing company and movie theater proprietor, was killed in an automobile accident in 1917. This resulted in the then six-year old Jackie and her older sister Dolores being placed in the care of their aunt and uncle for a brief period of time. Eventually, Jackie's mother remarried and the family relocated to the nearby city of Monongahela. Ormes described the suburb in a 1985 interview for the Chicago Reader as "spread out and simple. Nothing momentous ever happens here." She graduated from high school in Monongahela in 1930.

Ormes drew and wrote throughout high school. She was arts editor for the 1929–1930 Monongahela High School Yearbook where her earliest efforts as a cartoonist can be seen in the lively caricatures of her school's students and teachers. It was during this period that she wrote a letter to the editor of the Pittsburgh Courier, a weekly African-American newspaper that was published on Saturdays. The then-editor, Robert Vann, wrote back. This correspondence led to her first writing assignment—covering a boxing match. Her coverage of subsequent matches led to her becoming an avid fan of the sport.

== Career ==
Ormes started in journalism as a proofreader for the Pittsburgh Courier. She also worked as an editor and as a freelance writer, writing on police beats, court cases and human-interest topics. While she enjoyed "a great career running around town, looking into everything the law would allow, and writing about it," what she really wanted to do was draw.

=== Cartooning ===
Ormes's first comic strip, Torchy Brown in Dixie to Harlem, first appeared in the Pittsburgh Courier on May 1, 1937. Her work was not syndicated in the usual sense, but, since the Courier had fourteen city editions, she was indeed read from coast to coast. The strip, starring Torchy Brown, was a humorous depiction of a Mississippi teen who found fame and fortune singing and dancing in the Cotton Club. Torchy's journey from Mississippi to New York City mirrored the journey of many African-Americans who ventured northward during the Great Migration. It was through Torchy Brown that Ormes became the first African-American woman to produce a nationally appearing comic strip. The strip ran until April 30, 1938. The reason for the strip's abrupt end is uncertain, but it is presumed to have been due to an end of her contract.

Ormes moved to Chicago in 1942. She soon began writing occasional articles and, briefly, a social column for The Chicago Defender, one of the nation's leading black newspapers, a weekly at that time. For a few months at the end of the war, her single panel cartoon, Candy, about an attractive and wisecracking housemaid, appeared in the Defender; the panel ran from March 24 to July 21, 1945.

By August 1945, Ormes's work was back in the Courier, with the advent of Patty-Jo 'n' Ginger, a single-panel cartoon which ran for 11 years. It featured a big sister-little sister set-up, with the precocious, insightful and socially/politically-aware child as the only speaker and the beautiful adult woman as a sometime pin-up figure and fashion mannequin. The strip ran from September 1, 1945, to September 22, 1956.

Starting August 19, 1950, the Courier began an eight-page color comics insert, where Ormes re-invented her Torchy character in a new comic strip, Torchy in Heartbeats. This Torchy was a beautiful, independent woman who finds adventure while seeking true love. Ormes expressed her talent for fashion design as well as her vision of a beautiful black female body in the accompanying paper doll topper, Torchy Togs. The strip is probably best known for its last installment on September 18, 1954, when Torchy and her doctor boyfriend confront racism and environmental pollution. Ormes used Torchy in Heartbeats as a sounding board for several big issues of the time. In a 1985 interview for Chicago Reader she claimed she was "anti-war-I was anti-everything-that's-smelly". Torchy presented an image of a black woman who, in contrast to the contemporary stereotypical media portrayals, was confident, intelligent, and brave.

=== Patty-Jo dolls ===
Ormes contracted with the Terri Lee doll company in 1947 to produce a play doll based on her little girl cartoon character. The Patty-Jo doll was on the shelves in time for Christmas and was the first American black doll to have an extensive upscale wardrobe. As in the cartoon, the doll represented a real child, in contrast to the majority of dolls that were mammy and Topsy-type dolls. The dolls were popular with both black and white children. In December 1949, Ormes's contract with the Terri Lee company was not renewed, and production ended. Patty-Jo dolls are now highly sought collector's items.

== Content and influence ==
Her heroines, including the iconic Torchy in Heartbeats, are strong and independent women who are socially and politically aware, who strive for their goals against all odds, defy social norms, and pick themselves up by the bootstraps and move on to the next adventure. In an interview towards the end of her life Ormes said, "I have never liked dreamy little women who can't hold their own." Ormes's creations not only defied expectations for black women, but gave her readership strong models for what the next powerful generation of young black women could become.

Jackie Ormes's heroines faced challenges that were relatable and contemporary, such as smothering aunts or the dangers of being taken advantage of in an unfamiliar environment. Torchy dealt with issues such as deception, unsympathetic peers, racism, danger, and heartbreak.

Ormes tackled social and political issues everywhere from race to sex to environmental pollution. In each aspect of her life the cartoonist was involved in humanitarian causes, and her passion for left-wing ideologies post-World War II even led to an investigation by the FBI.

== Retirement ==
Ormes retired from cartooning in 1956, although she continued to create art, including murals, still lifes and portraits until rheumatoid arthritis made this impossible. She contributed to her South Side Chicago community by volunteering to produce fundraiser fashion shows and entertainments. She was also on the founding board of directors for the DuSable Museum of African American History. Ormes was a passionate doll collector, with 150 antique and modern dolls in her collection, and she was active in Guys and Gals Funtastique Doll Club, a United Federation of Doll Clubs chapter in Chicago.

== Personal life and death ==
Jackie Ormes married accountant Earl Ormes in 1931. The couple initially moved to Salem, Ohio, so Earl could be close to his family. But Ormes was not happy there, and they eventually moved to Chicago. The pair had one child, Jacqueline, who died of a brain tumor at the age of three. Ormes and Earl remained married until his death in 1976.

Ormes died of a cerebral hemorrhage in Chicago on December 26, 1985.

== Legacy ==
Ormes was posthumously inducted into the National Association of Black Journalists Hall of Fame in 2014, inducted into the Will Eisner Comic Industry Eisner Award Hall of Fame as a Judges' Choice in 2018 and into the Society of Illustrators Hall of Fame in 2026.

A Google Doodle on September 1, 2020, paid homage to her work.

== See also ==
- Ormes Society
- Barbara Brandon-Croft
