= Rembert Browne =

American writer

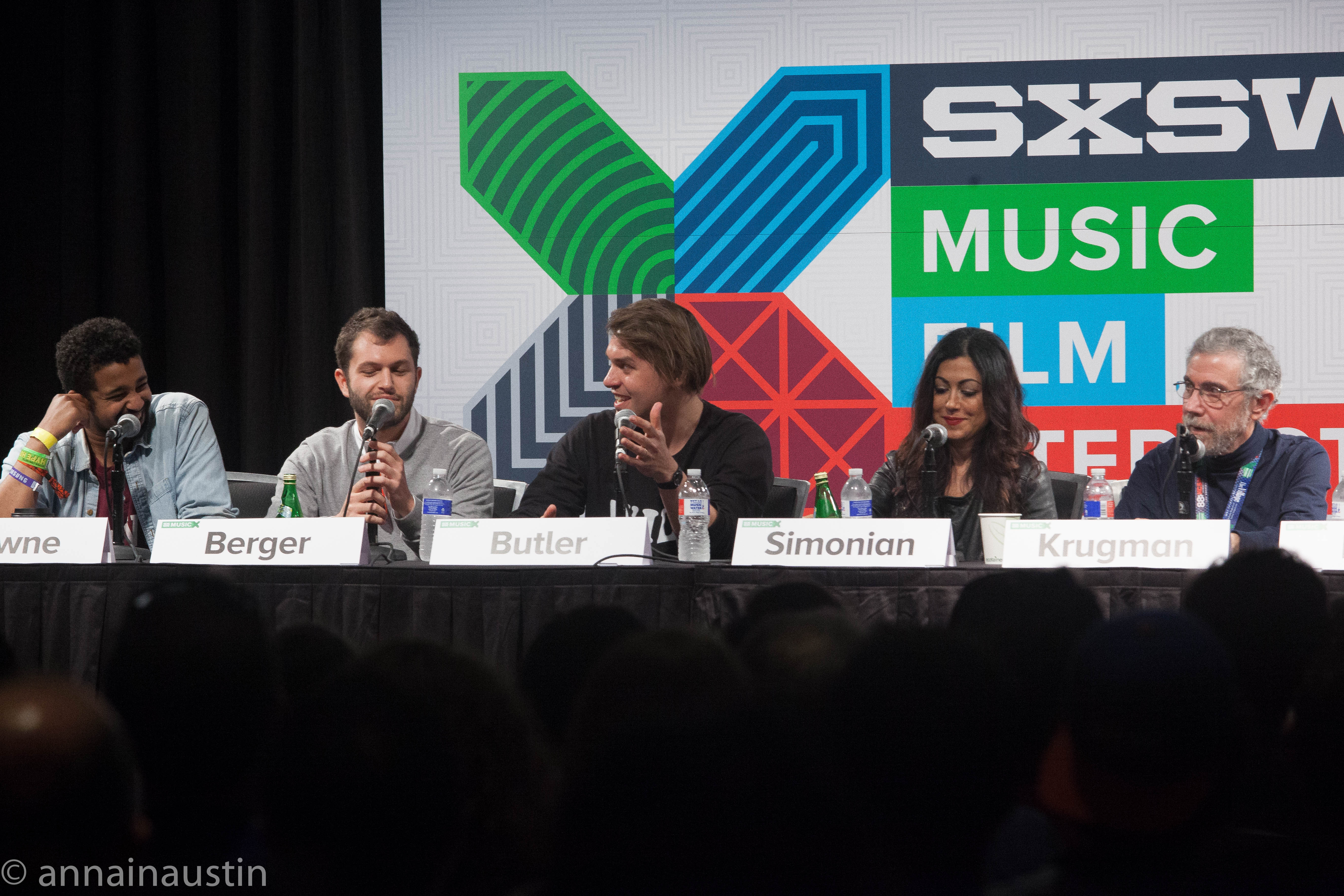
- Browne (left)
- Born: 1987 (age 38–39)
- Education: Dartmouth College
- Occupation: Journalist
- Writing career
- Subjects: Pop culture, sports, politics

Rembert Browne (born 1987) is a writer who primarily focuses on pop culture, politics and sports. Previously Browne wrote for Grantland, then for New York Magazine.

== Early life ==
Browne grew up in Atlanta and attended The Paideia School, where his classmate was Jon Ossoff, now the senior U.S. senator from Georgia. He graduated from Dartmouth College in 2009 with a degree in sociology, public policy and geography. While attending Dartmouth, Browne wrote for The Dartmouth, the student newspaper. He later attended Columbia University in pursuit of a Master's degree in Urban Planning but left the program when he was offered a full-time position at Grantland. He currently lives in Los Angeles with his wife Andrea Gompf.

== Writing ==
Browne has drawn notice for his journalism on a wide variety of topics, including music, sports, and politics, interviewing President Obama on the 50th anniversary of the Selma March and serving as a moderator of the Iowa Democratic Brown and Black Presidential Forum during the 2016 U.S. Presidential campaign. Browne covered the Republican and Democratic National Conventions for New York Magazine in 2016.

In 2016, Forbes magazine named Browne to its 30 Under 30 list, citing his work on "everything from reporting on the ground in Ferguson, to interviewing President Obama on Air Force One, to covering pop culture." He was selected with four other journalists to fly with President Barack Obama to Selma, Alabama on March 7, 2015 to report on commemoration of the 50th anniversary of Selma to Montgomery Voting Rights March in March of 1965.

The A.V. Club has called Browne, "a thoughtful critic who speaks with the voice of young America" and Brooklyn Magazine included him on its list of "100 Most Influential People in Brooklyn Culture," praising his "sharp-witted, playful and incisive voice." Offering a eulogy for Grantland after ESPN shuttered the website, The New Republic said Browne illustrated the way Grantland was "fun because it was smart, and because it was run by human beings...Browne’s long, absurdly detailed critical analysis of a photo of Nicki Minaj surrounded by dorky teenagers at a bar mitzvah [was] a singular example of how much fun one could have on the internet...an inspired, creative bit of fun."

USA Today named Browne's Grantland piece on Kevin Durant to its list of "The 13 Greatest Pieces of Sportswriting in 2013" and Flavorwire cited his reporting on the Ferguson protests as "Longform You Have to Read: Race in America."

== Other media ==
Other projects led by Browne include Grantland's Rembert Explains podcast—praised by The A.V. Club as "knowledgeable and enthusiastic...making for a spirited conversation"—as well as a popular Tumblr called Peak Blackness. He spoke at The New Museum's Ideas City conference on Detroit and at the Museum of the Moving Image's screening of ESPN's 30 for 30: O.J.: Made in America.

With Ta-Nehisi Coates, Browne co-wrote Black Panther: World of Wakanda #6 for Marvel Comics, published April 19, 2017.
