= Rural Home Missionary Association =

- Formation: 1942
- Executive Director: Adam Kipp
- Website: rhma.org

Rural Home Missionary Association (RHMA) is an evangelical organization that plants and strengthens churches in small-town America. It was founded in 1942 by rural pastor C.J. Rediger.

RHMA seeks to plant new churches and strengthen existing churches through conferences and training. Glenn Daman suggests that it has been "instrumental in expanding rural church ministry."

RHMA has missionaries across rural America who are either church planters or church strengtheners. In either case, the goal is to bring the local church to self-sustaining status.

The annual Small-Town Pastors' Conference (inaugurated in 1994) seeks to affirm, encourage, and equip pastoral couples in rural settings.

The TACT [Town and Country Training] Program (inaugurated in 2008) consists of seminary-level, week-long classes (in June) which introduce and train for rural ministry.
