= An Untamed State =

2014 novel by Roxane Gay

- First edition
- Author: Roxane Gay
- Language: English
- Genre: Fiction
- Publisher: Grove Atlantic
- Publication date: 2014
- Publication place: United States
- ISBN: 978-0-8021-2251-3

An Untamed State is the debut novel of writer Roxane Gay, first published in 2014 by Grove Atlantic.

== Plot ==
Mireille Duval Jameson is born and raised in the United States, her parents are from Haitian descent. Her parents move back to Haiti. While vacationing at her parents' house with her husband and child in Haiti, she is kidnapped. When her father, who by now has become a wealthy Haitian developer, refuses to pay her ransom, she is gang-raped and tortured by her captors, who keep her imprisoned for 13 days before finally releasing her.

=== "Happily Ever After" ===
In the first portion of the book, called "Happily Ever After," the novel moves back and forth in time between Mireille's captivity and her earlier life, meeting and falling in love with husband Michael during graduate school in the Midwest of the United States.

=== "Once Upon a Time" ===
The latter section of the novel, "Once Upon a Time," follows Mireille in the aftermath of her trauma, including her time living with Michael's mother, Lorraine, on the family farm in Nebraska.

== Themes ==
Commentary on An Untamed State frequently cites the novel's emphasis on fairy tale. Reviewing the novel for the Los Angeles Times, Chris Daley suggests the fairy tale theme serves to translate unspeakable trauma: "Written from Mireille's perspective, 'An Untamed State' is an account of what is normally unaccountable: a level of trauma that, even if it is survived, is often too painful to relate. From the first sentence, we know Mireille has found a way to craft her story to make it bearable. She frames it as a fairy tale: 'Once upon a time, in a far-off land, I was kidnapped'". In the New York Times, Holly Bass said in contrast to contemporary, happy-ending-focused fairy tales, Gay's interpretation of the genre recalled "the real horrors of the original Brothers Grimm stories and their ilk ... that a passing stranger raped Sleeping Beauty as she lay unconscious, or that Snow White's jealous stepmother not only called for her death but wanted to eat her liver and lungs. Roxane Gay's striking debut novel, 'An Untamed State,' is a fairy tale in this vein, its complex and fragile moral arrived at through great pain and high cost."

== Reception ==
=== Reviews ===
The Los Angeles Times called it "suspenseful, immediate and realistic." The A.V. Club awarded it an A letter grade and praised it as "a gripping psychological portrait of how trauma remakes the body to respond only to itself."

=== Awards ===
Gay was nominated for an NAACP Image Award for Outstanding Literary Work, Fiction in 2015 for An Untamed State.

== Adaptation ==
In March 2016 director Gina Prince-Bythewood announced she would be adapting the novel into a feature film for Fox Searchlight. Prince-Bythewood and Gay will co-write the film, to star Gugu Mbatha-Raw. Prince-Bythewood will direct and will also produce with Michael De Luca. Prince-Bythewood and Mbatha-Raw previously collaborated on Beyond the Lights.
