= Kimberly Drew =

American art curator, writer, activist

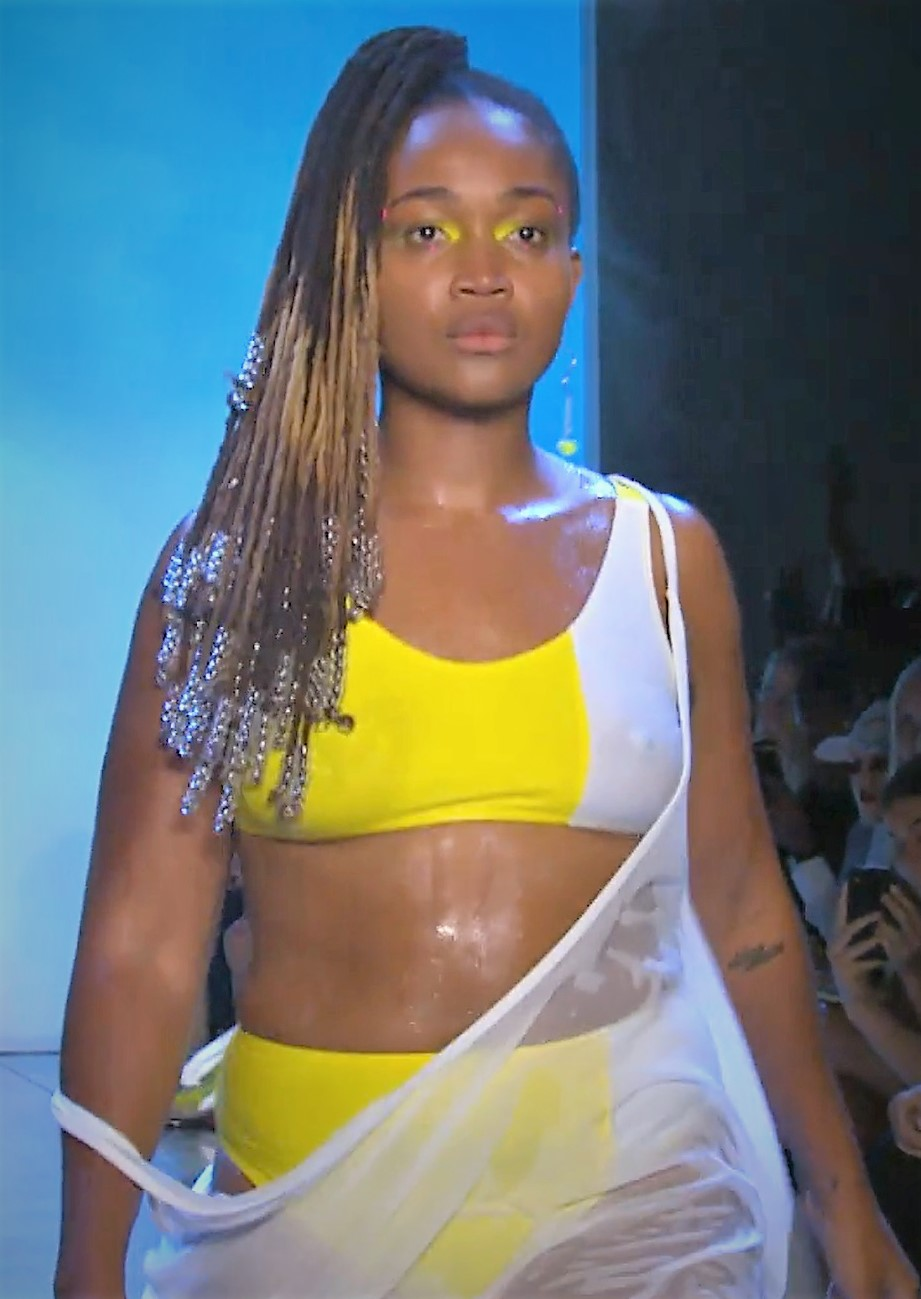
- Drew models for Chromat during New York Fashion Week 2018
- Born: Orange, New Jersey, U.S.
- Education: Smith College
- Occupations: Art curator Writer Former social media manager for the Metropolitan Museum of Art
- Years active: 2011–present
- Known for: @MuseumMammy (Instagram account); Black Contemporary Art blog on Tumblr
- Notable work: Black Futures (with Jenna Wortham)
- Partner: Chase Strangio

Kimberly Drew is an American art influencer and writer. She is best known as the former social media manager for the Metropolitan Museum of Art and her use of the social media handle @MuseumMammy. Drew released her first book, This Is What I Know About Art in June 2020, as part of a children's book series from Penguin, and published an anthology titled Black Futures with New York Times staff writer J Wortham in December 2020.

== Early life and education ==
Drew grew up in Orange, New Jersey, in a family of artists. She attended Link Community School in Newark, New Jersey. In 2008, she graduated from St. George's School in Middletown, Rhode Island.

After graduating from high school Drew attended Smith College in Northampton, Massachusetts. She studied mathematics and engineering before ultimately declaring a double major in art history and Africana studies, and a concentration in museum studies. During her second year at Smith, Drew interned at the Studio Museum in Harlem with Thelma Golden, which influenced her later choice of concentration and informed her career path. She graduated from Smith in 2012.

== Career ==
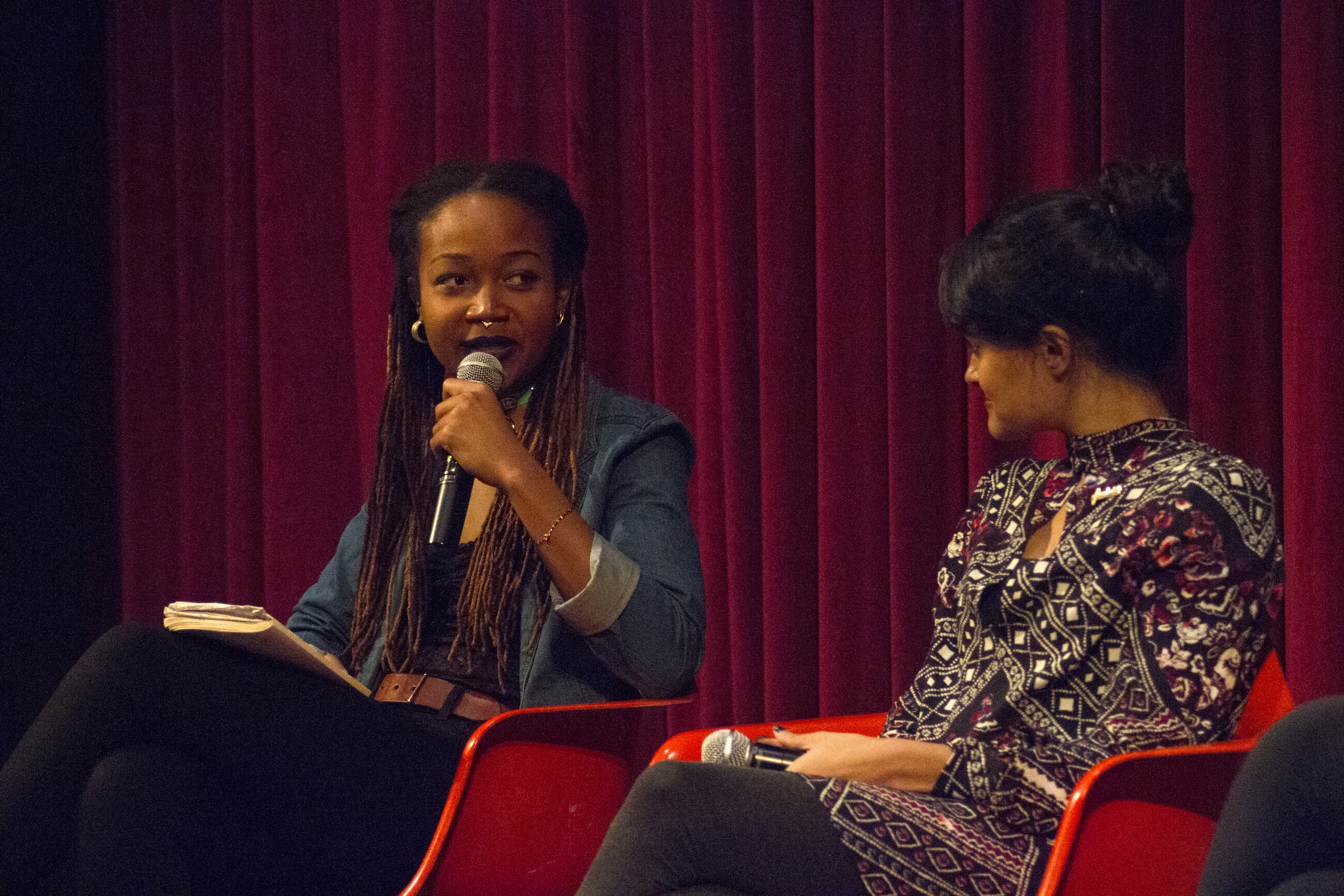
Drew speaking at Art+Feminism at MoMA, 2017

In March 2011, Drew started the Tumblr blog Black Contemporary Art while still in college. She and others posted about Black artists who were featured on museum websites but had no digital presence on Tumblr, so that they "were part of a recorded history." Drew has referred to herself as a "a curator of "black art and experiences" and has been recognized by Artsy for advocating for racial equality in the art world. She has spoken about the importance of tying art to activism and protests, specifically in the immediate aftermath of the high-profile murders of Black Americans such as George Floyd and Ahmaud Arbery, and the shootings of Breonna Taylor and Tony McDade.

After graduating from Smith College, Drew worked on the communications team at Lehmann Maupin gallery, as well as for Hyperallergic and Creative Time. In July 2015, Drew was hired as the Associate Online Community Producer at the Metropolitan Museum of Art in New York City, a position that she held until November 2019.

In 2016, Drew curated the White House's Instagram account during the 2016 South by South Lawn festival. That July, Drew, along with writers Taylor Renee Aldridge and Jessica Lynne and art historian Jessica Bell Brown, organized a project called Black Art Incubator, a two-month long program of book exchanges, art critiques, and panel discussions.

In 2018, Drew modeled for the Chromat Spring/Summer 2019 runway during New York Fashion Week.

In 2021, she launched an online event series Black Power Lunch Hour and began hosting Hulu's podcast Your Attention Please.

In February 2022, Pace Gallery announced that Drew would be joining as associate director.

In November 2025, Drew was announced as a member of New York City Mayor-elect Zohran Mamdani's Committee on Arts and Culture.

=== Books ===
Beginning their connection through Twitter's direct-messaging, Drew co-edited and released the anthology Black Futures with journalist Jenna Wortham. After five years in the making, the anthology encapsulates a multitude of art forms by more than 100 Black creators responding to the question, "What does it mean to be Black and alive, right now?" Their creation stamps a time when the height of Black empowerment coexists with long-term systemic oppression. Drew and Wortham's goal is to bring to light how Black culture surrounds everyday society and how Blackness is limitless. Black Futures was published by Random House's One World imprint in December 2020.

On June 2, 2020, Drew released her first book, This Is What I Know About Art, a book for young adults under the Penguin Workshop imprint.

== Honors and awards ==
In 2016, Drew received the inaugural Feminist Curator Award from AIR Gallery. The same year, she was listed on the Yerba Buena Center for the Arts 100 List, which identifies creative and cultural catalysts of change. In 2017, she was named one of Brooklyn Magazine's 100 Influencers of Brooklyn Culture.

In 2020, she was awarded the Smith College Medal, which recognizes outstanding alumnae who contribute to their communities.

== Personal life ==
Drew resides in Brooklyn and is queer. Her partner is Chase Strangio, a civil rights lawyer.
