= J Wortham =

American journalist

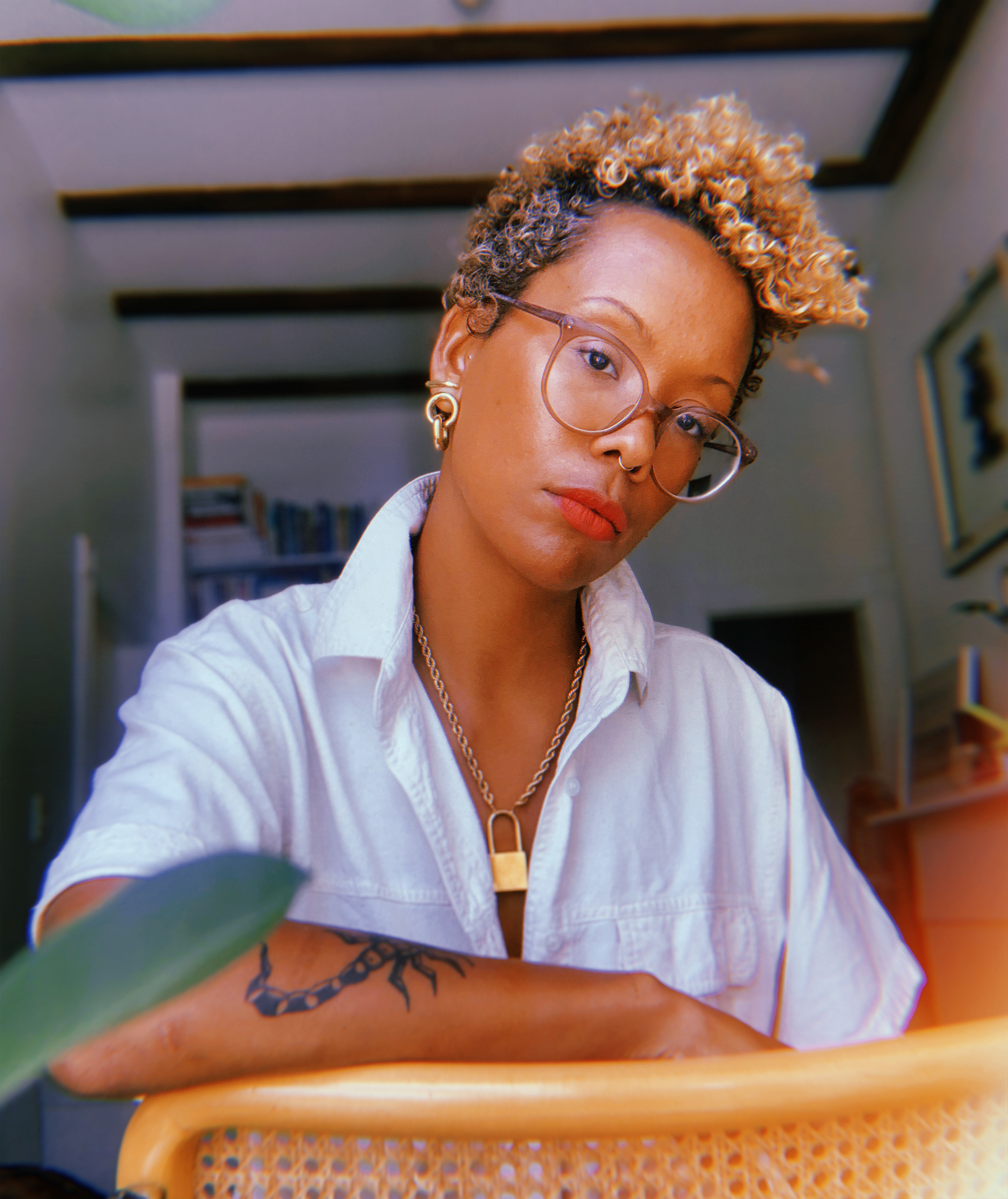
- Wortham in 2020
- Education: University of Virginia
- Occupation: Journalist
- Employer: The New York Times
- Known for: Still Processing; Black Futures (with Kimberly Drew)
- Website: JennyDeluxe.com

J Wortham (formerly known as Jenna Wortham) is an American journalist. They work as a culture writer for The New York Times Magazine. Wortham was co-host of The New York Times podcast Still Processing with Wesley Morris, which ran from 2016 to 2022. In 2020, with Kimberly Drew, Wortham published Black Futures, an anthology of Black art, writing and other creative work.

Wortham began their journalism career freelancing in San Francisco, then worked for Wired before joining the Times in 2008.

== Early life ==
Wortham grew up in Alexandria, Virginia, then studied medical anthropology at the University of Virginia. They graduated in 2004.

== Career ==
=== Journalism ===
After college, Wortham moved to San Francisco, where they interned for San Francisco Magazine and Girlfriend Magazine and wrote for SFist, eventually becoming a technology and culture reporter for Wired. They joined The New York Times in 2008, working as a technology and business reporter, then moved to the Times Magazine in 2014; Politico said the hire "gives the magazine additional editorial firepower and cachet," citing Wortham's "huge following" including more than 530,000 Twitter followers as of December 2014.

Wortham's work has also appeared in Matter, The Awl, Bust, The Hairpin, Vogue, The Morning News, and The Fader among other publications. Pi.co calls them "one of those rare writers who is able to explain the shapeshifting culture of the younger and newer internet." In 2012, Wortham was included in The Root 100 list. The Fader named Wortham's piece on The Shade Room "Instagram's TMZ" to its list of "The Best Culture Writing of 2015".

In addition to praise for their technology reporting, Wortham has been recognized for their commentary on a range of cultural topics. At The Village Voice, Mallika Rao described Wortham as "skirt[ing] the edges of tech, culture, and identity in (their) writing — carving out (their) own corner of the internet wherein (they are) a rightful star. (A shimmering Lemonade essay prompted a thank-you note from the Queen herself, signed "Love, Beyoncé" and 'grammed by Wortham.)" Other topics in Wortham's writing have included queer identity and race and gender on television. At Rookie, Diamond Sharp praised Wortham's "incisive writing, and the generous way (they move) within the world. (They) is, with no hyperbole, one of the most important minds working in media." Wortham's work appears in the anthologies Never Can Say Goodbye: Writers on Their Unshakable Love for New York (2014) and An Experience Definitely Worth Allegedly Having: Travel Stories from The Hairpin (2013).

=== Books ===
With Kimberly Drew, Wortham edited a collection entitled Black Futures, published in December 2020 by Random House's One World imprint.

Wortham is also writing the essay collection Work of Body, about their "formative experiences as a queer Black person, against the backdrop of technology and the larger history of Black bodies in America". Work of Body will be published by Penguin.

=== Fellowships ===
In 2017, Wortham was the Zora Neale Hurston Fellow at the first Jack Jones Literary Arts retreat. They were awarded a fellowship at the MacDowell Colony in 2018. In 2020, Wortham and their New York Times colleague Wesley Morris were named Kelly Writers House Fellows.

=== Still Processing ===
In September 2016, Wortham and Morris launched a culture podcast called Still Processing, produced by the Times and podcasting startup Pineapple Street Media. The show debuted to favorable reviews ("an incredible mix" and "refreshing") and made year-end "best of" lists at The Atlantic, The Huffington Post, and IndieWire. In 2020, the podcast was nominated American Society of Magazine Editors Magazine Award.

=== Other projects ===
In 2011, Wortham created Girl Crush Zine with Thessaly La Force, a project After Ellen said aimed "to show women embracing their love for other women." Other contributors included fiction writers Jennifer Egan and Emma Straub—with Straub writing about their "girl crush" on Egan.

In November 2014, Wortham debuted an ongoing project called Everybody Sexts which "collect[s] anecdotes of people's sexting decisions, accompanied by nudes from said sexting incidents that are then recreated by an array of artists," including Melody Newcomb. Vice Media's technology vertical Motherboard said Wortham's treatment of sexting was "one of the first to transcend hand-wringing or how-to guides, and present the sexual behavior as something worthy of inspiring art."
