= Nite-Wing =

DC Comics character

- Tad Ryerstad as Nite-Wing on the cover of Nightwing vol. 2, #31 (March 1999); art by Scott McDaniel.

Publication information
- Publisher: DC Comics
- First appearance: Nightwing (vol. 2) #8 (May 1997)
- Created by: Chuck Dixon (writer); Scott McDaniel (artist)

In-story information
- Alter ego: Tad Ryerstad
- Partnerships: Torque
- Notable aliases: Tadpole
- Abilities: Capable street fighter Carries many billiard balls Use of a modified three-foot pool stick or steel rod as weapons

Nite-Wing (Tad Ryerstad) is a fictional character in the DC Comics series Nightwing. He is an antagonist, a fascist foil to the eponymous superhero (Dick Grayson), and as an allegory of toxic fandom.

Obsessed with becoming a superhero to attain purpose, fame, and wealth, Ryerstad based his vigilantism on mass culture such as comic books, films, television, and paperbacks, his hatreds and prejudices, and accusations against him (despite his claims to be fighting injustice). He is rejected and despised by Nightwing and other heroes after they discover that he is a psychopathic, reactionary neo-fascist unable to distinguish right from wrong, a spree killer no different from the supervillains and other criminals he seeks to fight. Ryerstad becomes a fugitive, pursued by the Federal Bureau of Investigation (FBI) and Nightwing. He blames Nightwing and his allies for ruining his life by depicting him as a villain and seeks to kill them, whom he calls "betrayers of justice" and believes that this would "clear his name".

Chuck Dixon said in a 2008 interview, "I wanted to show, without the proper upbringing and the wrong motivations, what would happen if a guy tried to become a vigilante. Tad's a guy who just gets everything wrong that Dick Grayson gets right, and he doesn't even necessarily have good in his heart ... He wanted the bragging rights of being a hero without having anything to recommend him as a hero, except that he got a buzz off the danger". The character was created as a part of DC Comics publications' effort to counter the then-popular style of violent and reckless pseudo-heroes in comics and other media and demonstrate that archetypal superheroes with strong morals, like Nightwing, made for a better hero. He is based on the 1950s Brooklyn Thrill Killers.

== Character biography ==
Tad Ryerstad, an amoral, narcissistic, hypocritical, and sociopathic fame-seeker, has a great deal of rage and hate and is prone to loud outbursts. He frequently refers to himself in the third person. The similarities between his name and Nightwing's have gotten him into trouble, and nearly led to his murder on two occasions.

Growing up an orphan in Blüdhaven, he goes by the first name of Tad — originally Tadpole, the nickname he was given in the orphanage because of his diminutive size. His last name, Ryerstad, is the name of a local beer brand adopted by his father Randy as a criminal alias; Tad never knew his family's true surname. His father was an abusive alcoholic; his mother constantly smoked and talked on the phone, and Tad never received a proper education. Due to his lack of parental involvement and his anti-social nature, Tad devoured popular culture by stealing paperbacks and comic books and sneaking into action films to escape; this desensitizes him to violence, but he teaches himself to read. His inadequate education, combined with an unstable and loveless childhood, produced a deluded psychotic trapped in a heroic fantasy. He was never sane, embodying what society feared from the mass media and child abuse.

Tad soon began to resent his father, who earned money by fencing, and feared that he was also on a criminal path. He frames his father (an act he believes to be heroic) by anonymously telling his father's crack dealer that he was an informer. His father was murdered by gangsters as a result, and his mother was imprisoned. After living with a number of foster parents who learn that he is violently unstable, Tad lives on his own. Unemployed, Tad is usually a vagrant who can afford to feed himself only by stealing from people he kills after accusing them of crimes. Having been a white supremacist after he was bullied by a Black patron in a comic book store as a child, Tad targets African Americans based on criminal stereotypes in the media; he has one person beaten nearly to death in front of his white step-nephew and niece (traumatizing them) after accusing him of pedophilia.

He meets John Law, an elderly novelist who was the Tarantula (a masked mystery man who was a member of the defunct All-Star Squadron superhero team). After hearing his stories, Tad decides to become a superhero (unaware that Law is terrified of him because he recognizes Tad's psychosis). He has difficulty finding a name until he sees an all-night deli specializing in chicken wings, naming himself Nite-Wing.

Tad corners Redhorn, Blüdhaven's corrupt police chief, and obtains the files pertaining to Blockbuster. He and Nightwing begin to attack Blockbuster's power base, but are captured and separated. When Ronald Houston (a Black undercover FBI agent who infiltrated Blockbuster's organization as Cisco Blaine) came to free Tad, Tad beats him to death. He flees, remorseless, after learning that Houston was a government agent. Nightwing tracks Tad down and tells him that would never be accepted by real superheroes like Superman or Batman, but he has gained notoriety amongst Nightwing's closest superhero allies (including Batman) and has been labeled a supervillain by Oracle (Barbara Gordon) on her databases. Despite his being insane, he is sentenced to Lockhaven Penitentiary, instead of a psychiatric hospital, due to the lack of a diagnosis by a criminal psychologist. Tad and Nightwing become enemies, and Tad vows to kill Nightwing.

In prison, Tad declares one-man war on Nightwing and all superheroes, whom he sees as hypocrites and villains. Tad naively tries to get himself released by giving his account to the federal agents who are holding him in custody, expecting them to share his mindset; however, he exposes himself as a spree killer. He denies his criminal status despite evidence to the contrary and beats the inmates who mock him. Tad later escapes prison and is implicated in the murder of Redhorn. He is innocent of that crime, however, and is framed by Blockbuster and the new Tarantula (Catalina Flores). He contacts Nightwing to help clear him, despite their antipathy. Tad is arrested again with Tarantula, and is returned to Lockhaven. He escapes on Christmas Eve, and is again at large.

== Powers and abilities ==
Tad has no superpowers, but he is in peak physical condition and a self-taught, ruthless street fighter. He often carries a number of billiard balls taped to his back, and uses a modified three-foot pool stick or a steel rod found in a junkyard as weapons.

== See also ==
- List of Batman family enemies
