= Nightwing (comic book) =

Comic book series featuring Nightwing

- Cover of Nightwing vol. 1, #1 (Sep 1995 DC Comics), art by Brian Stelfreeze.

Publication information
- Publisher: DC Comics
- Schedule: Monthly
- Format: List: (vol. 1) Limited series (vol. 2-4) Ongoing series
- Genre: Superhero
- Publication date: List: (vol. 1) July–October 1995 (vol. 2) August 1996 – February 2009 (vol. 3) September 2011 – May 2014 (vol. 4) July 2016 – present
- No. of issues: List: (vol. 1): 4 (plus one Special (vol. 2): 155 (plus two Annuals) (vol. 3): 30 (plus an #0 and one Annual) (vol. 4): 135 (plus three Specials and 7 Annuals)

Creative team
- Written by: List: (vol. 1): Dennis O'Neil (vol. 2): Chuck Dixon Devin Grayson Judd Winick Bruce Jones Marv Wolfman Peter Tomasi (vol. 3): Kyle Higgins Tim Seeley (vol. 4): Tim Seeley Benjamin Percy Dan Jurgens Tom Taylor Dan Watters
- Penciller: List: (vol. 1): Greg Land (vol. 2): Scott McDaniel Greg Land Rick Leonardi Rags Morales Don Kramer Jamal Igle (vol. 3): Eddy Barrows Brett Booth Will Conrad Russell Dauterman (vol. 4): Javier Fernández Bernard Chang Chris Mooneyham Bruno Redondo Chris Mooneyham Dexter Soy Denys Cowan
- Inker: List: (vol. 1): Mike Sellers Nick J. Napolitano (vol. 2): Karl Story Greg Adams Aaron Sowd Rodney Ramos Michael Bair (vol. 3): Eber Ferreira J.P. Mayer Norm Rapmund Vicente Cifuentes (vol. 4): Javier Fernández Bernard Chang Klaus Janson Bruno Redondo Norman Rapmund

Nightwing is an American comic book featuring the character Nightwing and published by DC Comics. The character first appeared in Tales of the Teen Titans #44 in 1984, but he received his own ongoing series, which debuted in July 1996.

== Publication history ==
=== Volume One (1995) ===
The series was launched in response to the character's growing popularity, beginning with Nightwing: Alfred's Return #1 (1995). A one-shot comic book where Dick Grayson travels to England to find Alfred Pennyworth, who has resigned from Bruce Wayne's service after the events of Knightfall. After he found Alfred, they thwart a plot by terrorists aiming to destroy the Channel Tunnel before returning to Gotham City. This was followed by a miniseries from September to December 1995, written by Dennis O'Neil with art by Greg Land, where Dick contemplates retiring as Nightwing. However, a family document reveals a connection between his parents' murder and the Crown Prince of Kravia, prompting him to travel there. Dick ultimately helps to overthrow the corrupt ruler while uncovering more about his family's past.

=== Volume Two (1996–2009) ===
==== "Titans Reunited" ====
In 1996, following the success of the miniseries, DC Comics launched a monthly solo series featuring Nightwing (written by Chuck Dixon, with art by Scott McDaniel), in which he patrols Gotham City's neighboring municipality of Blüdhaven.

Upon the request of Batman, Dick journeys to the city of Blüdhaven to stop the gangster Black Mask. He then becomes the arch-enemy of the villain Blockbuster. Dick decides to stay in Blüdhaven until he destroys Blockbuster's drug cartel. After Cyborg is put in danger by a galactic threat, Dick reunites the Teen Titans to rescue him. They reform as the Titans, but Dick is pulled away to Gotham City when it is declared a No Man's Land. Following the recuperation of Gotham, Dick stays active as both the leader of the Titans and stays in Blüdhaven.

Following the deaths of Lilith Clay and Troia, Dick officially disbands the Teen Titans. Dick then returns to Blüdhaven and becomes more and more like Bruce, straining his relationships and eventually blurring the line between being a police officer and a vigilante. The vigilante Tarantula then kills the Blockbuster, who Dick fails to save. Blockbuster's death haunts him to the point of temporarily retiring from crime-fighting. At length, Nightwing shakes himself from his depression and takes responsibility for his inaction.

==== Infinite Crisis ====
Due to a crisis of conscience, Dick adopts the new villainous persona of Renegade to infiltrate Lex Luthor's Secret Society of Super Villains. This ruse includes Nightwing aligning himself with his long-time enemy Deathstroke in order to track the manufacturing and distribution of Bane's Venom serum and to keep tabs on the Society's activities in Gotham and Blüdhaven. He also begins training (and subtly converting) Deathstroke's daughter Rose Wilson.

Deathstroke takes revenge on Nightwing after Blüdhaven's destruction. The Society drops the supervillain Chemo onto the city, killing 100,000 people. Dick tries to rescue survivors, but faced with radiation poisoning. He is then rescued by Batman, when Nightwing asks forgiveness from Batman about Blockbuster's death, Batman persuades Dick to finally move beyond. Inspired by his mentor, he then proposes to Barbara Gordon, who tearfully accepts.

Batman then entrusts Nightwing to alert other heroes about the danger that the Crisis poses. Dick flies to Titans Tower, but due to the chaos resulting from the Blüdhaven disaster, the OMAC onslaught, and other Crisis-related events, the only hero who answers his call is Conner Kent. They are soon joined by Wonder Girl. Together, they locate and attack Alexander Luthor Jr.'s tower, the center of the Crisis, only to be repelled by Superboy-Prime. Prime is ready to kill Nightwing when Conner intervenes, sacrificing himself to destroy the tower, stopping the destruction of the universe.

During the Battle of Metropolis, Nightwing suffers a near-fatal injury from Alexander Luthor Jr. when he attempts to save Batman's life. Originally, the editors at DC intended to have Dick Grayson killed in Infinite Crisis as Newsarama revealed from the DC Panel at WizardWorld Philadelphia:

It was again explained that Nightwing was originally intended to die in Infinite Crisis, and that you can see the arc that was supposed to end with his tragic death in the series. After long discussions, the death edict was finally reversed, but the decision was made that, if they were going to be keeping him, he would have to be changed. The next arc of the ongoing series will further explain the changes, it was said.

Saved by the Justice Society, Nightwing recovers with Barbara at his side. As soon as he is able to walk again, Batman asks him to join him and Robin in retracing Bruce's original journey in becoming the Dark Knight. While Nightwing is hesitant, Barbara becomes the major reason on Nightwing's decision to rejoin. Before he departs, Dick leaves her an envelope containing a photograph of them as Robin and Batgirl, along with the engagement ring on a chain and a note promising he will come back to her one day.

Soon after his journey with Batman and Robin ends, Nightwing returns to Gotham, following Intergang's trail. He works with the new Batwoman and Renee Montoya to stop Intergang from destroying Gotham.

==== "One Year Later" ====
One year later, Dick Grayson returns to New York City (his previous home base with the Teen Titans) in order to find out who has been masquerading as Nightwing. The murderous impostor turns out to be the former Robin, Jason Todd. Grayson leads the Outsiders once again, operating undercover and globally.

Nightwing follows an armored thief named Raptor, whom he suspects is responsible for a series of murders. Later, Raptor himself is murdered in a manner similar to the other victims by an unseen contract killer, who proceeds to bury Grayson alive. Nightwing frees himself, wondering the relation between his experience and a mysterious voice who tells him that he is "supposed to be dead". Nightwing is having trouble finding things to keep him busy during the day due to the cast on his right arm. Incapacitated from his injuries, he tries without luck to find jobs, which forces him to take a job as a low-paid acrobatic instructor at a local gym, and continues to research into the mysterious assassin.

At one point, Dick agrees to attend a party for Bruce and their relationship seems to flourish. Bruce praises Dick for his success on the Raptor case, and also mentions to look into the Landman Building which hosted ex-LexCorp scientists; most likely those who worked on the Raptor project. Dick also continues to keep a close brotherly relationship with Tim Drake, and helps Tim deal with his many losses during the last year.

After dealing with the Raptor issue, NYC is plagued by a villainous duo called Bride and Groom. Nightwing begins pursuit of these two after some grisly murders, including that of the Lorens family (close friends of his after the Raptor incident). Dick began to get obsessed with finding them, not knowing how far he was willing to go to take them down. Eventually, he formed a makeshift team with some "villains" to find them. They located them, and after killing some of his "team," Nightwing chased them to a cave, where Bride began a cave-in and the two are trapped there.

Nightwing, along with a group of former Titans, are summoned again by Raven to aid the current group of Teen Titans battle against Deathstroke, who was targeting the latest team in order to get at his children, Ravager and the resurrected Jericho. Nightwing and the other former Titans continue to work with the current team soon after the battle with Deathstroke so as to investigate the recent murder of Duela Dent.

When the Outsiders were targeted by Checkmate, Nightwing agrees that his team will work with the organization, so long as their actions in Africa are not used against them in the future. The mission, however, does not go as well as intended, resulting in Nightwing, the Black Queen and Captain Boomerang being captured by Chang Tzu. Later, Batman is called in by Mister Terrific who then rescues Nightwing and the others. Afterwards, Nightwing admits to Batman, that while he accepts that he is an excellent leader, he is not suited to lead a team like the Outsiders, and offers the leadership position to Batman.

Batman accepts the position; however, he feels that the team needs to be remade, in order to accomplish the sorts of missions that he intends them to undertake. As such, he holds a series of try-outs for the team. The first audition involves Nightwing and Captain Boomerang, who are sent to a space station under attack by Chemo. During the mission, a confrontation erupts between Nightwing and Boomerang, who has grown tired of fighting for redemption. After a heated altercation, Boomerang quits the team. Nightwing then again furiously confronts Batman. This time, Nightwing resigns completely from the Outsiders. He goes back to New York and later finds himself confronted with one of his greatest enemy.

==== "Titans Return" ====
Nightwing joins a new team of Titans, with the same roster of the New Teen Titans, to stop an as-yet unnamed offspring of Trigon from enacting his vengeance over Raven and the Titans of every generation. Nightwing yet again leads the team, and they manage to stop the sons of Trigon from accomplishing their first attempt at global destruction and again a few days later.

Following the defeat of Trigon's sons, the Titans are approached by Jericho, who had been stuck inhabiting the body of Match, Conner Kent's clone. The Titans managed to free Jericho, but found themselves once again in trouble, because Jericho's mind had become splintered due to all the bodies he had possessed in the past. Torn between evil and good, Jericho possesses Nightwing's body in order to keep from being captured. During this time, Jericho forces Nightwing to relive all of his greatest pains. Soon afterward the JLA arrived, intent on taking Jericho in, but they fail to apprehend him.

Following this, Nightwing decides to leave the team again, due to the events of the "Batman R.I.P." storyline and Batman's apparent death, as Nightwing feels his attention is better aimed at protecting Gotham City. Nightwing thus moves on from relationship and keen on fighting crime. Following the "Batman: Battle for the Cowl", Dick finally decides to take the mantle of Batman, leading to this title along with the Robin comic series getting cancelled, leaving room for two new titles; Batman and Robin and Batman: Streets of Gotham.

=== Volume Three (2011–2014) ===
In September 2011, The New 52 rebooted DC's continuity. In this new timeline, Bruce Wayne again patrols Gotham as Batman and Dick is Nightwing. In the re-established history, there are some adjustments to Dick's biography. In the new universe, he is five years younger, making him 21 years old. He was adopted by Bruce as his legal ward at the age of 16 and not as his son due to Dick not wanting to replace his father, but after training Dick as Robin, the two gained a father-son relationship and eventually Bruce adopted him as his son. After graduating high school, Dick founded the Teen Titans and began to study law.

His activities with the Titans would lead to him to having a fallout with Bruce and straining their relationship and forcing him to become Nightwing. Their relationship with each other would worsen throughout the years and only begin to restore until after Bruce, with a broken back, lets Dick substitute as Batman, being his prodigal son. Following Bruce's absence, Dick became Batman and Damian Wayne his Robin but Bruce's return sparked changes in the city that forced Dick to return as Nightwing after a whole year of being Batman.

Nightwing writer Kyle Higgins would reveal that the overarching Prince of Gotham storyline set into motion due to the Night of the Owls would involve Dick realizing his place in Gotham. He also revealed that the storyline would be about Dick's status in Gotham elevating, him questioning his role in Gotham and whether what he does for the city is worth it and what the future of Gotham is to that point. When pressed for detail on the arc, who would appear and what changes would come to Dick, Higgins provided the following explanation:

"[T]he arc will be introducing a lot of new characters who will be in the book going forward. We've got everyone from Deputy Mayor Kavanaugh, who was introduced in "Night of the Owls" but you'll be seeing more of him in this arc; Sonia Zucco is coming back to the Bat world and she'll be in the book going forward; you've got a new detective who may or may not be framing Nightwing. And Nightwing himself, Dick Grayson, is coming out of everything with the Owls and looking towards the future. He's taking a new approach, he's got some ideas on how to make a difference in Gotham City."

During the "Death of the Family" event, one of Dick's friends Jimmy Clark who worked as a circus clown was murdered by the Joker because the Joker felt like Jimmy was a knockoff of him. Nightwing later discovers the Joker broke Raya out of prison and infected her with his toxin and has forced her to fight while wearing a makeshift Nightwing costume. The toxin eventually killed Raya, though Nightwing tried in vain with an anti-toxin to save her. Nightwing then discovered that the Joker left a message on Raya's abdomen that he was targeting Haly's Circus next. However, upon arriving there, the Joker unveils his plan to burn the circus to the ground and then infects Nightwing with his gas that not only causes him to experience hallucinations of Jimmy and Raya, but he is soon attacked by the other members of Haly's Circus that were also affected by the toxin, allowing the Joker to capture him. The events of "Death of the Family" destroyed Dick's life, with the Joker ruining his project for renovating Amusement Mile. The Joker also bankrupted him, as Dick invested all of his money into the project as a result of Sonia Zucco's initial refusal to fund the project. Following this, it led to a major shift in Nightwing's status quo. In the aftermath, Haly's Circus is gone, with Dick broke as a result for having lost his investment. While the other circus members survived since the Joker used a different toxin on them, they blame Dick and decide to leave after Raya and Jimmy's funeral, though deep down they know it is not his fault. Dick becomes bitter from his loss and after he used excessive force to bring down some criminals that tried to plunder valuables from the remains of the circus, Damian Wayne, who had been monitoring him, is able to talk some sense into Nightwing that helped him recover.

In "Forever Evil", after the Crime Syndicate invade Prime Earth and defeat the Justice League, Nightwing is captured, and his secret identity revealed to the world. Following their escape from the Syndicate, Batman and Catwoman decide to rescue him. He then is invited by Owlman to help take down the Crime Syndicate, in which he accepts. During his captivity, Nightwing is imprisoned in a containment unit, with his heart monitored to set off a bomb should he attempt to escape. The alliance of Batman, Lex Luthor, Catwoman, Captain Cold, Bizarro, Sinestro, Black Manta and Black Adam break into the fallen Watchtower to free him, but also to sabotage the Syndicate. When they are detected, the bomb is triggered to detonate in minutes. Batman tries to free Nightwing, but Luthor, believing there was no time, incapacitates Batman and Catwoman before suffocating Grayson until he dies, and the bomb is deactivated. An enraged Batman begins to brutalize Luthor, while Luthor tries to tell him that there may be still time to save Dick. Luthor in an uncharacteristically heroic moment injects his heart with a shot of adrenaline successfully reviving Grayson and saving his life as well as the others. Cyborg enters having defeated Grid and Grayson joins Batman, Cyborg and Catwoman in freeing the Justice League from the Firestorm matrix. After the defeat of the Syndicate, Grayson is seen with Batman in the Batcave. Batman tells him that he has to send him on the most dangerous mission he could possibly undertake. The Nightwing title concluded in April at issue #30, and was replaced with a new title, Grayson, in July, where after surviving the Murder Machine and the world believing that he is dead with only Batman knowing he survived in the aftermath of the Crime Syndicate's invasion, Dick gave up his life as Nightwing and went undercover by becoming an agent of Spyral, the secretive counter-intelligence organization that previously helped Batman Incorporated, where the former Batwoman Kathy Kane worked.

=== Volume Four (2016–present) ===
==== DC Rebirth ====
Dick returns to being Nightwing in his black and blue costume, starting with the DC Rebirth relaunch in 2016, and used his new skills and expertise in espionage moving forward. Nightwing is featured in two DC Rebirth books: Nightwing (vol. 4), his own solo book, and Titans, where Dick teams up with the other original Teen Titans after Wally West returns to the universe; through Wally, Dick remembers events of his life in the new DC Rebirth timeline that resembles both of the Pre-Flashpoint's and The New 52's.

In his solo book, Dick is paired with a vigilante named Raptor and the two plan to bring down the Court of Owls from the inside. Barbara criticizes Dick's willingness to trust him and doesn't agree with his methods. Though Raptor seemed willing to play by Dick's rules of not killing, he tricks Dick into agreeing to a plan that results in the deaths of all of the Parliament of Owls in Sydney. After knocking Dick out, Raptor goes to Gotham and kidnaps Bruce during a conference. Nightwing confronts him alone in the ruins of a circus in Paris. Raptor reveals that he grew up in the circus as a child and fell in love with Dick's mother, Mary, as they stole from the rich and powerful in Paris. Raptor watched over Dick in the shadows as he grew up, and developed a hatred for Bruce Wayne, as he represented everything he and Mary were against and felt it was dishonoring her memory to have Dick raised by him. Dick defeats Raptor and rescues Bruce in time.

After joining forces with the pre-Flashpoint Superman to defeat the latest attack of Doctor Destiny, Dick decided to relocate to Blüdhaven based on Superman's reference to how the pre-Flashpoint Grayson acted as the city's guardian for a time, hoping to build a life beyond Gotham City like his counterpart. While there, he meets a supervillain rehabilitation group called the Run-Offs, all of which were villains he and Batman had defeated in the past. He finds that most of them are being framed for crimes around the area and works with them to find the true culprits. After solving the case and clearing their names, Dick begins dating their leader Shawn Tsang, the former criminal known as the Defacer. Shawn is kidnapped by Professor Pyg after Dick discovers she might be pregnant with his child, and he teams up with Damian to track Pyg down and rescue her. After Shawn is revealed not to be pregnant, she ultimately breaks up with Dick, who focuses his efforts on taking down criminals such as the Blockbuster, the returning Raptor, the Judge, and Wyrm.

==== Infinite Frontier ====
With the release of Infinite Frontier, after returning to his role as Blüdhaven's protector, Grayson is informed by Barbara Gordon that he has been bequeathed a fortune by Alfred Pennyworth, accumulated during his years of service to the Wayne family. He decides to use this newfound wealth to establish a philanthropic foundation to revitalize Blüdhaven, while continuing to fight corruption and crime as Nightwing. In both efforts, he is opposed by Blockbuster as well as a new villain, Heartless, who steals peoples' hearts to sustain his own life. He is supported by Barbara, who reclaims her mantle as Batgirl; Tim Drake, once again operating as Robin; the Titans; Jon Kent, who is publicly operating as Superman in his father's absence; and two unexpected new allies: the new mayor of Blüdhaven, who is his previously unknown half-sister, and a pit bull puppy whom Grayson adopts and names Haley.

== Supporting characters ==
=== Enemies ===
Like Batman, Nightwing has faced various villains ranging from common criminals to outlandish supervillains. While the character has primarily fought other Batman villains, he also has established villains that primarily oppose him. In addition, certain Batman villains have specific enmity with Dick Grayson.

==== Dixon rogues ====
Villain	Creator(s)	First appearance	Fictional biography
Blockbuster	Roger Stern; Tom Lyle	Starman #9 (April 1989)	Roland Desmond became the second Blockbuster after a severe illness forced him to be treated with experimental steroids. Like his brother Mark, Roland became a child-minded super-strong monster.
Brutale	Chuck Dixon; Scott McDaniel	Nightwing (vol. 2) #22 (July 1998)	Guillermo Barrera was a top-level interrogator/torturer for the secret police in Hasaragua until a revolution forced him to flee. He began a new career as a mercenary/assassin and eventually began working for Blockbuster. Barrera is an expert with all forms of knives and blades.
Double Dare	Chuck Dixon; Scott McDaniel	Nightwing (vol. 2) #32 (June 1999)	Margot and Aliki Marceau are sisters who were circus performers in Cirque Sensationnel. While skilled aerialists and having achieved great fame, they were less well-known than the Flying Graysons and Boston Brand. The Marceau sisters eventually chose a double-life of crime as thieves, using their talents in service to Blockbuster, and became at odds with Nightwing, both of whom the sisters are infatuated with.
Giz	Chuck Dixon; Jim Balent	Catwoman (vol. 2) #28	Giz is an expert computer hacker who once worked alongside fellow thieves Sly Flox, Catwoman and Mouse (his girlfriend), forming a team. Eventually, Mouse and Giz split from the team, but remained together. In DC Rebirth, Giz is named Brendon Li and is of Asian descent. Giz works with Nightwing briefly until he is killed by the Second Hand, a shell corporation of Spyral.
Lady Vic	Chuck Dixon; Scott McDaniel	Nightwing (vol. 2) #14 (January 1997)	Lady Elaine Marsh-Morton is a woman hailing from a long line of British mercenaries and carries an arsenal of exotic weaponry, relics of her ancestor's plundering throughout the centuries. She operates as a hired killer to prevent foreclosure on her family estate.
Mouse	Chuck Dixon; Mike Parobeck	Robin (vol. 2) #18	Mouse is an expert thief trained by Catwoman and involved in a relationship with Giz. She was among the many operatives in Blockbuster's criminal organization.
Shrike	Chuck Dixon; Scott McDaniel	Nightwing Secret Files and Origins #1 (October 1999)	Several characters share the name Shrike and serve primarily as enemies of Dick Grayson: The first Shrike is a member of the League of Assassins who takes in young children and trained them to be assassins. After witnessing Dick Grayson's fighting prowess against his students when they threatening him, he takes him in as a trainee. Shrike later learns Dick's true identity when Batman arrives to save him. During the alternation, he is taken down when Two-Face intervenes after an assassination attempt by the League of Assassins from his group of students and killed when he accidentally falls on his blade.; The second Shrike, known only as Boone, is a childhood friend of Dick Grayson who harbors a long-standing enmity for him. Shrike traveled alone throughout the Pacific Rim, gleaning an array of martial arts skills both from a variety of unsavory teachers, including several former operatives of the League of Assassins.; Boone's brother, known as Blue Shrike, fought as a participant in the League of Lazarus on Lazarus Island, wanting to restore his brother's honor after his reputation was tarnished due to repeated defeats from Nightwing.
Stallion	Chuck Dixon; Scott McDaniel	Nightwing (vol. 2) #14 (November 1997)	Randy Hanrahan was a wide receiver for the Dallas Cowboys until he suffered a anterior cruciate ligament injury during a pre-season game. Nicknamed "Stallion" throughout his life, he would work as a bouncer for Penguin, later becoming a freelance agent and assassin. In DC Rebirth, the character was re-introduced with most of his origin intact although he is instead cast as a reformed villain as part of the Run-Offs and a closeted homosexual.
Torque	Chuck Dixon; Scott McDaniel	Nightwing (vol. 2) #1 (October 1996)	Dudley Soames is the former police inspector of Blüdhaven and a corrupt cop who serves as a secret informant for Blockbuster. After Blockbuster attempts to kill him by snapping his neck, Soames survives, but is left with his head permanently facing backwards. He is rehabilitated from radical drug therapy and uses special glasses with rear-view mirrors to see forwards.

==== Higgins rogues ====
Villain	Creator(s)	First appearance	Fictional biography
Archeron the Demon	Kyle Higgins; Eddy Barrows	Nightwing (vol. 3) #5 (August 2013)	Archeron is a rhyming demon summoned by Zohna, a witch who is obsessed with a Jimmy Allen Clark, a clown in Haly's Circus who was once her lover. Serving Zohna, she used Archeron to force Jimmy into a soul-binding ceremony. Through his ingenuity, Nightwing manages to banish the demon back to his realm.
Feedback	Kyle Higgins; Eddy Barrows	Nightwing (vol. 3) #3 (January 2013)	A former circus performer at Haly's Circus whose real name is Zane, he was a former friend of Dick, Raymond, and Raya. Later in his life, he gained implants that allowed him to transmit radio-based waves to trigger specific emotions, creating illusions of a person's fears and insecurities. Zane became a booking agent for contract killers, operating in Chicago.
Ghostwalker	Kyle Higgins; Brett Booth	Nightwing (vol. 3) #21 (August 2013)	Maxwell Morgan is a detective of the Chicago Police Department with a notable hatred for vigilantes in Chicago and a proponent for their ban in the city. Morgan begrudgingly worked alongside Nightwing during his tenure in the city to stop Prankster. In secret, it revealed that he is the vigilante known as "Ghostwalker", a former vigilante sidekick to Chicago's resident hero, Aether, and is responsible for the later systematic slaughter of Chicago's vigilantes.
Prankster	Kyle Higgins; Brett Booth	Nightwing (vol. 3) #19 (June 2013)	Oswald Loomis is Prankster, a criminal hacker who sets up death-traps for his victims in his crimes. Loomis would adopt a super-villain vendetta when his father, an electrical engineer, was killed from a sour deal while working on train lines by a group of criminals known as the Cole brothers. Although one was apprehended, he did not rat out his brothers and Oswald promised revenge and was an opponent of Nightwing when he sought to defame Wallace Cole as mayor of Chicago. Nightwing eventually teamed up with Tony Zucco, who faked his death and turned over a new leaf, to stop Prankster from destroying Chicago. Arrested, he would escape and became a member of the Secret Society of Super Villains.
Mali the Mimic / Marionette	Kyle Higgins; Brett Booth	Nightwing (vol. 3) #19 (June 2013)	Mali the Mimic is an anti-villain who developed dissociative identity disorder after being psychologically manipulated by the Mad Hatter. Most of her crimes focus on stealing a highly controlled, anti-psychotic drug known as Cranium, which temporarily heals her mental damage. In addition, Mali is a mimic capable of mimicking abilities she has visually seen.
Paragon and the Republic of Tomorrow	Kyle Higgins; Eddy Barrows	Nightwing (vol. 3) #2 (December 2011)	Paragon is a cult leader of a Gotham-based group known as the Republic of Tomorrow, a cult with hatred for Gotham-based vigilantes for perceived negligence of their actions on ordinary citizens. A genius in the field of thermodynamics and engineering, Paragon created technology that allowed him to utilize electrified whips, has suitable combat skills, and is a skilled manipulator.
Saiko	Kyle Higgins; Eddy Barrows	Nightwing (vol. 3) #1 (May 2012)	Raymond McCreary was a former circus acrobat and one of Dick Grayson's childhood friends following the new continuity established from Flashpoint. When Dick's parents were killed and he was consequentially taken in by Batman, McCreary was chosen by the Court of Owls as his replacement, the shadowy society faking McCreary's death. Failing to meet their expectations despite his brutal training and scarring in the eyes, he was released and Raymond sought revenge on Dick, attempting to kill him and using Raya to lure him into a trap. He is killed when he was eventually defeated by Nightwing, choosing to end his life rather than having Nightwing save him.
Shox	Kyle Higgins; Eddy Barrows	Nightwing (vol. 3) #6 (April 2012)	A minor villain that acts as a right-hand man to Terrence Clark, a well-known booking agent for assassins and contracts killers in the Southwest region of the United States. Shox is most notable for using a robotic suit in combat.
Spinebender	Kyle Higgins; Eddy Barrows	Nightwing (vol. 3) #4 (February 2012)	Spinebender is a shape-shifting thief with powers of elasticity that has an interest in advanced technology. Foiled by Nightwing and Batgirl, he held a grudge against the former and followed him to Chicago and made an attempt on Nightwing's life in suicidal rage though he survives his own suicidal attempt to kill Nightwing.
Zohna	Kyle Higgins; Eddy Barrows	Nightwing (vol. 3) #5 (August 2013)	Zohna is a witch who was once the lover of Jimmy Allen Clark, a clown of Haly's Circus who broke up with her due to following the supernatural. Obsessed, she sacrificed her family and created a magical ring to summon Archeron, binding the demon to her will and using him to kidnap Jimmy and perform a soul-binding ceremony. She was foiled by Nightwing and taken into custody.

==== Seeley/King Grayson rogues ====
Villain	Creator(s)	First appearance	Fictional biography
Mister Minos	Tim Seeley; Tom King; Mikel Janín	Grayson #1 (July 2014)	The former director of Spyral during Dick Grayson's tenure as Agent 37. He aims to collect the biological robotic parts of "Paragon", an android whose super-powered organs grant him powers associated with the Justice League, to learn their secret identities through DNA testing. It would be later revealed that he was unwittingly a mole intended to infiltrate Spyral and use their resources to learn the identities of the Justice League. Minos was killed by Agent Zero before he could publicly reveal the identities of the Justice League.
Doctor Elizabeth Netz / Frau Netz	Tim Seeley; Tom King; Mikel Janín	Grayson #1 (July 2014)	Daughter of the founder of Spyral Otto Netz and the sister of the first Batwoman, Kathy Kane, she appeared as both a scientist of Spyral and an assistant to the directors of Spyral. Frau Netz invented the nanite technology used by Spyral and gave up her dreams of singing to follow in her father's footsteps. After Netz refuses to join Leviathan, Mark Shaw responding by having her obliterated.
Christopher Tanner / Old Gun	Tim Seeley; Tom King; Mikel Janín	Grayson #3 (September 2014)	A one-shot villain; the Old Gun was an assassin for hire who became blind after being attacked by a madman during a school shooting, in which said man gunned down his two sons. He underwent experimental surgery that allowed him to visually see through the tip of his guns and became an assassin. He comes into conflict with Spyral during their arms race for Paragon's body parts as he comes across the android's eyes to restore his sight and have the ability to see his only surviving son, Christopher Tanner Jr. Not compatible with his body, Dick appeals to his better nature to give it up, but Old Gun is gunned down by Agent 8.
Agent 8	Tim Seeley; Tom King; Mikel Janín	Grayson #3 (September 2014)	One of the top agents of Spyral, she appeared to have a romantic relationship with Agent One while briefly having a one-night stand with Dick Grayson despite Spyral's policy against romantic ties with other agents. While initially appearing to be Dick's ally, she was later revealed to be a double agent for Frau Netz and Leviathan. After Frau Netz is defeated and Otto Netz's resurrection is foiled, Agent 8 is killed by Agent 1.
Doctor Poppy Ashmore	Tim Seeley; Tom King; Mikel Janín	Grayson #2 (August 2014)	A former member of the British Secret Intelligence (T.H.E.Y), biologist, and member of several think tanks. She was also secretly an agent for Batman's villain and human trafficker, Mother, who took in traumatized children and molded them to suit the needs of her clients. Having been disturbed by the supernatural and extraterrestrial findings and conspiracies witnessed during her tenure in T.H.E.Y, she would come across an opportunity to arm humanity against conflict by experimenting with Paragon's stomach, an enhanced organ that contained the powers of the Flash. She would implant the organ into her body, discovering her super-speed also gave her insatiable hunger, forcing her to become a cannibal.
The Syndicate	Tim Seeley; Tom King; Mikel Janín	Grayson #9 (June 2015)	A group of spies who are considered the top espionage agents in the world and work to maintain peace and alliances between all intelligence organizations. They come into conflict with Spyral over time, whose members were seemingly testing the status quo. The Syndicate would later become directly involved as Agent Zero's ultimate agenda of resurrecting Otto Netz came to fruition as well as Maxwell Lord's attempt to wipe out Spyral and gain the Minos files (which contained the list of the Justice League's secret identities). Membership included existing DC and Vertigo characters such as King Faraday, Bronze Tiger, Frankenstein, Grifter, and Tactical Augmented Organism (aka Tao). It also featured newly created characters such as Gwisin and Keshi.

==== Other rogues ====
Villain	Creator(s)	First appearance	Fictional biography
Court of Owls / Parliament of Owls	Scott Snyder; Greg Capullo	Batman (vol. 2) #3 (December 2011)	During the "Robin War" storyline, the Court of Owls created a global off-shoot of their organization and became known as the "Parliament of Owls". A shadowy society like the off-shoot, they work to expand their influence globally through their highly trained agents known as "Talons". Due to his bloodline from William Cobb, the Parliament is equally persistent in recruiting Dick Grayson as a Talon due to his skills and status, willing to use both blackmail and even forms of mind-control to achieve their goals.
Talon (William Cobb)	Scott Snyder; Greg Capullo	Batman (vol. 2) #2 (December 2011)	William Cobb is one of the talons of the Court of Owls, a near-mythical organization in Gotham City and the paternal great-grandfather of Dick Grayson. Born into a middle-class family, Cobb lost his father at a young age during an occupational accident working on a bridge in Gotham. Unable to support himself and his mother, Cobb joined Haly's Circus. Cobb is eventually indoctrinated into the Court of Owls as Talon.
Deathstroke (Slade Wilson)	George Perez; Marv Wolfman	The New Teen Titans #2 (December 1980)	Deathstroke (Slade Wilson) is a mercenary with enhanced physical abilities akin to that of a super-soldier. Initially introduced as a Teen Titans villain, Deathstroke has a complicated history with Dick Grayson.
Kathy Kane / Agent Zero	Edmond HamiltonSheldon Moldoff	Detective Comics #233 (July 1956)	The original Batwoman, Kathy Kane's character, and history were revised in the Grayson title while keeping most elements of her previous history intact. While still the daughter of German director and founder of Spyral, Otto Netz, her history also includes a sister with whom she established a fierce rivalry as their father purposely manipulated and pitted them against one another throughout their childhood in an attempt to have suitable heirs.

== Critical reception ==
=== Nightwing Vol. 3 (2011 – 2014) ===
Erik Norris's review of Nightwing #1 on IGN was generally positive but with some reservations. He acknowledged that while the issue wasn't a phenomenal debut, it was a solid and reassuring start for fans of Dick Grayson. Norris appreciated how writer Kyle Higgins demonstrated a strong understanding of the character, as shown previously in Batman: Gates of Gotham. However, he didn't consider it groundbreaking, and the review reflected a cautious optimism for the series going forward. IGN Jesse Schedeen's reviews of issues #13 to #17 highlight both the emotional depth and the action-packed moments that define the series. He consistently praises Kyle Higgins’ writing and Eddy Barrows’ artwork for their ability to balance the character personal struggles with thrilling sequences.

Melissa Grey's reviews of issues #18 to #25 are generally mixed. She notes that while these issues tackle significant emotional themes, such as Dick Grayson's mourning of Damian Wayne in issue #18, the heavy dialogue sometimes weakens the impact. As the series progresses, Grey points out that the art often struggles to capture the emotional nuances effectively. However, in issues like #25, she praises the balance of darker tones with hopeful themes, appreciating how the art contributes to the overall storytelling.

== Collected editions ==
Most of the original ongoing Nightwing series was collected in several trade paperbacks while the series was being published. Beginning in 2014, the series was reprinted, with new editions including material that had previously been omitted.

=== Volume 1 and 2 (Post-Crisis) ===
#	Title	Material collected	Released	ISBN
Original trade paperbacks
	Nightwing: Ties That Bind	Nightwing: Alfred's Return; Nightwing (vol. 1) #1-4	Sep 1997	978-1563893285
	Nightwing: A Knight In Blüdhaven	Nightwing (vol. 2) #1-8	Aug 1998	978-1563894251
	Nightwing: Rough Justice	Nightwing (vol. 2) #9-18	Sep 1999	978-1563895234
	Nightwing: Love And Bullets	Nightwing (vol. 2) #½, #19, #21-22, #24-29	Apr 2000	978-1563896132
	Nightwing: A Darker Shade Of Justice	Nightwing (vol. 2) #30-39; Nightwing: Secret Files And Origins	Dec 2000	978-1563897030
	Nightwing: The Hunt For Oracle	Nightwing (vol. 2) #41-46; Birds of Prey #20-21	Jan 2003	978-1563899409
	Nightwing/Huntress	Nightwing/Huntress #1-4 (mini-series)	Jan 2004	978-1401201272
	Nightwing: Big Guns	Nightwing (vol. 2) #47-50; Nightwing: Secret Files and Origins; Nightwing 80-Page Giant	Feb 2004	978-1401201869
	Nightwing: On The Razor's Edge	Nightwing (vol. 2) #52, #54-60	Jun 2005	978-1401204372
Issues #71-100 are collected A Knight in Blüdhaven Compendiums Three and Four
	Nightwing: Year One	Nightwing (vol. 2) #101-106	Aug 2005	978-1401204358
	Nightwing: Mobbed Up	Nightwing (vol. 2) #107-111	Mar 2006	978-1401209070
	Nightwing: Renegade	Nightwing (vol. 2) #112-117	Nov 2006	978-1401209087
	Nightwing: Brothers In Blood	Nightwing (vol. 2) #118-124	Mar 2007	978-1401212247
	Nightwing: Love And War	Nightwing (vol. 2) #125-132	Oct 2007	978-1401214630
	Nightwing: The Lost Year	Nightwing (vol. 2) #133-137, Nightwing (vol. 2) Annual #2	Mar 2008	978-1401216719
	Nightwing: Freefall	Nightwing (vol. 2) #140-146	Nov 2008	978-1401219659
	Nightwing: The Great Leap	Nightwing (vol. 2) #147-153	Aug 2009	978-1401221713
New edition trade paperbacks
	Nightwing: Old Friends, New Enemies	Material from Secret Origins (vol. 2) #13; material from Action Comics Weekly #613-618, #627-634	Aug 2013	978-1401240448
1	Blüdhaven	Nightwing Vol. 1 #1-4; Nightwing (vol. 2) #1-8	Dec 2014	978-1401251444
1	Blüdhaven	Nightwing Vol. 1 #1-4; Nightwing (vol. 2) #1-8	Apr 13, 2025	978-1799501381
2	Rough Justice	Nightwing (vol. 2) #9-18, Nightwing Annual #1	Jun 2015	978-1401255336
3	False Starts	Nightwing/Huntress #1-4; Nightwing (vol. 2) #½, #19-25	Jan 2016	978-1401258559
4	Love And Bullets	Nightwing (vol. 2) #26-34, #1,000,000; Nightwing Secret Files and Origins #1	Apr 2016	978-1401260873
5	The Hunt For Oracle	Nightwing (vol. 2) #35-46; Birds of Prey #20-21	Nov 2016	978-1401265021
6	To Serve And Protect	Nightwing (vol. 2) #47-53; Nightwing 80-Page Giant #1	Jul 2017	978-1401270810
7	Shrike	Nightwing (vol. 2) #54-60; Nightwing: Our Worlds At War #1; Nightwing: Targets #1	Feb 2018	978-1401277567
8	Lethal Force	Nightwing (vol. 2) #61-70	Nov 2018	978-1401285050
Issues #71-100 are collected A Knight in Blüdhaven Compendiums Three and Four
	Nightwing by Peter Tomasi	Nightwing (vol. 2) #140-153	Jan 2020	978-1401291716
Compendiums
1	A Knight in Blüdhaven Compendium Book One	Nightwing (vol. 1) #1-4; Nightwing (vol. 2) #1-25, #1,000,000; Nightwing Annual #1; Wizard Presents Nightwing #½; Nightwing/Huntress #1-4; Green Arrow (vol. 2) #134-135; Robin (vol. 2) #55; Detective Comics #723-725, #1,000,000	Apr 7, 2024	978-1779525864
2	A Knight in Blüdhaven Compendium Book Two	Action Comics #771; Batman Annual #23; Nightwing (vol. 2) #26-59; Birds of Prey #8, 20–21; Nightwing Secret Files; Nightwing 80-Page Giant; Nightwing: The Target	Apr 20, 2025	978-1799501480
3	A Knight in Blüdhaven Compendium Book Three	Batman #600, 605; Nightwing #60-82; The Flash Plus Nightwing; Birds of Prey #37; Batman: Gotham Knights #14, #16-17, #20-21; Nightwing: The Target; Batman: The 10-Cent Adventure; Joker: Last Laugh Secret Files and Origins; Joker: Last Laugh #1-6; Nightwing: Our Worlds at War	Apr 5, 2026	978-1799508120

=== Volume 3 (The New 52) ===
#	Title	Material collected	Legacy	Pages	Released	ISBN
Trade paperbacks
1	Traps And Trapezes	Nightwing (vol. 3) #1-7	#158-164	160	Oct 16, 2012	978-1401237059
2	Night Of The Owls	Nightwing (vol. 3) #0, #8-12	#165-169	144	Jul 30, 2013	978-1401240271
3	Death Of The Family	Nightwing (vol. 3) #13-18; Batman (vol. 2) #17, material from Young Romance #1	#170-175	176	Dec 10, 2013	978-1401244132
4	Second City	Nightwing (vol. 3) #19-24	#176-181	144	Jul 15, 2014	978-1401246303
5	Setting Son	Nightwing (vol. 3) #25-30, Annual #1	#182-187	200	Dec 16, 2014	978-1401250119
Omnibus
	Nightwing: The Prince Of Gotham Omnibus	Nightwing (vol. 3) #0-30, Batman #17, Young Romance: A New 52 St. Valentine's Day Special #1, Nightwing Annual #1, Secret Origins #1	#158-187	824	Jan 29, 2021	978-1779507006
	Nightwing: The Prince Of Gotham Omnibus	Nightwing (vol. 3) #0-30, Batman #17, Young Romance: A New 52 St. Valentine's Day Special #1, Nightwing Annual #1, Secret Origins #1	#158-187	824	May 6, 2025	978-1799501312

=== Grayson ===
After the events of Nightwing (vol. 3) #30, Dick Grayson left behind his superhero life to become an agent of the fictional spy agency Spyral.

- Main article: Grayson

#	Title	Material collected	Released	ISBN
1	Agents Of Spyral	Grayson #1–4, Grayson: Futures End; material from Secret Origins (vol. 3) #8	Jun 9, 2015	HC: 978-1401252342
1	Agents Of Spyral	Grayson #1–4, Grayson: Futures End; material from Secret Origins (vol. 3) #8	Jan 26, 2016	TPB: 978-1401257590
2	We All Die At Dawn	Grayson #5–8, Annual #1	Feb 2, 2016	978-1401257606
3	Nemesis	Grayson #9–12, Annual #2, DC Sneak Peek: Grayson	May 24, 2016	978-1401262761
4	A Ghost In The Tomb	Grayson #13–16, Robin War #1–2	Oct 18, 2016	978-1401267629
5	Spiral's End	Grayson #17–20, Annual #3, Nightwing: Rebirth	Jan 17, 2017	978-1401268251
Omnibus
	The Superspy Omnibus	Grayson #1-20, Grayson: Futures End #1, Grayson Annual #1-3, Robin War #1-2, Nightwing: Rebirth, material from Secret Origins (vol. 3) #8	Oct 24, 2017	978-1401274160
	The Superspy Omnibus	Grayson #1-20, Grayson: Futures End #1, Grayson Annual #1-3, Robin War #1-2, Nightwing: Rebirth, material from Secret Origins (vol. 3) #8	Aug 27, 2019	978-1401295059
	The Superspy Omnibus	Grayson #1-20, Grayson: Futures End #1, Grayson Annual #1-3, Robin War #1-2, Nightwing: Rebirth, material from Secret Origins (vol. 3) #8	Nov 15, 2022	978-1779517326

=== Volume 4 (DC Rebirth, post-Rebirth, Infinite Frontier, and Dawn of DC) ===
Following the events of Grayson #20, Dick Grayson returns to Blüdhaven, and life as Nightwing.

#	Title	Material collected	Legacy	Format	Pages	Released	ISBN
1	Better Than Batman	Nightwing: Rebirth; Nightwing (vol. 4) #1-4, #7-8	#188-191, #194-195	TPB	168	Jan 31, 2017	978-1401268039
	Batman: Night Of The Monster Men	Batman (vol. 3) #7-8; Nightwing (vol. 4) #5-6; Detective Comics #941-942	#192-193	HC	144	Feb 28, 2017	978-1401270674
	Batman: Night Of The Monster Men	Batman (vol. 3) #7-8; Nightwing (vol. 4) #5-6; Detective Comics #941-942	#192-193	TPB	144	Oct 31, 2017	978-1401274313
2	Back To Blüdhaven	Nightwing (vol. 4) #9-15	#196-202	TPB	168	Jun 20, 2017	978-1401270858
3	Nightwing Must Die	Nightwing (vol. 4) #16-21	#203-208	TPB	128	Sep 26, 2017	978-1401273767
4	Blockbuster	Nightwing (vol. 4) #22-28	#209-215	TPB	176	Jan 23, 2018	978-1401275334
5	Raptor's Revenge	Nightwing (vol. 4) #30-34	#217-221	TPB	128	May 1, 2018	978-1401278816
6	The Untouchable	Nightwing (vol. 4) #35-43	#222-230	TPB	216	Sep 18, 2018	978-1401287573
7	The Bleeding Edge	Nightwing (vol. 4) #44-49, Annual #1	#231-236	TPB	160	Dec 31, 2018	978-1401285593
8	Knight Terrors	Nightwing (vol. 4) #50-56	#237-243	TPB	192	Jun 11, 2019	978-1401291280
9	Burnback	Nightwing (vol. 4) #57-62	#244-249	TPB	144	Nov 12, 2019	978-1401294588
10	The Gray Son Legacy	Nightwing (vol. 4) #63-69, Annual #2	#250-256	TPB	208	May 19, 2020	978-1779500212
	The Joker War	Nightwing (vol. 4) #70-77, Annual #3	#257-264	HC	248	Mar 2, 2021	978-1779505699
	The Joker War	Nightwing (vol. 4) #70-77, Annual #3	#257-264	TPB	248	Aug 15, 2023	978-1779521149
	The Joker War Saga	Batman (vol. 3) #95-100; plus tie-in stories from Batgirl; Red Hood And The Outlaws; Catwoman; Harley Quinn; Nightwing; Detective Comics		HC	336	Feb 23, 2021	978-1779511799
	The Joker War Saga	Batman (vol. 3) #95-100; plus tie-in stories from Batgirl; Red Hood And The Outlaws; Catwoman; Harley Quinn; Nightwing; Detective Comics		TPB	336	Jan 10, 2022	978-1779514967
The series saw a soft reboot after The Joker War, with Tom Taylor taking over as writer
1	Leaping Into The Light	Nightwing (vol. 4) #78-83	#265-270	HC	160	Dec 14, 2021	978-1779512789
1	Leaping Into The Light	Nightwing (vol. 4) #78-83	#265-270	TPB	160	Jun 6, 2023	978-1779516992
	Fear State	Nightwing (vol. 4) #84-86, Annual #4 (2021); material from Batman: Urban Legends #10	#271-273	HC	152	Jun 21, 2022	978-1779515506
	Fear State	Nightwing (vol. 4) #84-86, Annual #4 (2021); material from Batman: Urban Legends #10	#271-273	TPB	152	Sep 5, 2023	978-1779520050
2	Get Grayson	Nightwing (vol. 4) #87-91; Superman: Son of Kal-El #9	#274-278	HC	160	Dec 27, 2022	978-1779517456
2	Get Grayson	Nightwing (vol. 4) #87-91; Superman: Son of Kal-El #9	#274-278	TPB	160	Dec 26, 2023	978-1779523020
3	The Battle For Blüdhaven's Heart	Nightwing (vol. 4) #92-96	#279-283	HC	176	Jun 27, 2023	978-1779520166
3	The Battle For Blüdhaven's Heart	Nightwing (vol. 4) #92-96	#279-283	TPB	176	Jun 11, 2024	978-1779525222
4	The Leap	Nightwing (vol. 4) #97-100, Annual #5 (2022)	#284-287	HC	192	Dec 12, 2023	978-1779520869
4	The Leap	Nightwing (vol. 4) #97-100, Annual #5 (2022)	#284-287	TPB	192	Jul 30, 2024	978-1779528025
5	Time Of The Titans	Nightwing (vol. 4) #101-105	#288-292	HC	152	Sep 10, 2024	978-1779525239
5	Time Of The Titans	Nightwing (vol. 4) #101-105	#288-292	TPB	152	Sep 10, 2024	978-1779529534
6	Standing At The Edge	Nightwing (vol. 4) ##106-109, #111-113	#293-296, #298-300	HC	192	Dec 24, 2024	978-1779528544
6	Standing At The Edge	Nightwing (vol. 4) ##106-109, #111-113	#293-296, #298-300	TPB	192	Dec 24, 2024	978-1779529435
7	Fallen Grayson	Nightwing (vol. 4) #114-118	#301-305	HC	152	Mar 25, 2025	978-1799500889
7	Fallen Grayson	Nightwing (vol. 4) #114-118	#301-305	TPB	152	Mar 25, 2025	978-1799500896
The series saw a soft reboot after Fallen Grayson, with Dan Watters taking over as writer
1	On With The Show	Nightwing (vol. 4) #119-124	#306-311	HC	160	Jul 1, 2025	978-1799501985
1	On With The Show	Nightwing (vol. 4) #119-124	#306-311	TPB	160	Jul 1, 2025	978-1799502005
2	Death Traps	Nightwing (vol. 4) #125-129	#312-316	HC	176	Jan 20, 2026	978-1799502548
2	Death Traps	Nightwing (vol. 4) #125-129	#312-316	TPB	176	Jan 20, 2026	978-1799502562
3	The Cirque du Sin	Nightwing (vol. 4) #130-135	#317-322	HC	152	Jul 21, 2026	978-1799508656
3	The Cirque du Sin	Nightwing (vol. 4) #130-135	#317-322	TPB	152	Jul 21, 2026	978-1799508663
DC Compact Classics
1	Nightwing: Leaping Into The Light	Nightwing (vol. 4) #78-88	#265-275	Digest	296	Mar 3, 2026	978-1799507703
Deluxe Oversized Hardcovers
1	Nightwing: Rebirth Deluxe Edition Vol.1	Nightwing: Rebirth; Nightwing (vol. 4) #1-15	#188-202	OHC	384	Oct 31, 2017	978-1401273750
2	Nightwing: Rebirth Deluxe Edition Vol. 2	Nightwing (vol. 4) #16-28	#203-215	OHC	312	May 22, 2018	978-1401278922
3	Nightwing: Rebirth Deluxe Edition Vol. 3	Nightwing (vol. 4) #29-43	#216-230	OHC	352	Jan 29, 2019	978-1401285678
Omnibuses
	Nightwing: Rebirth Omnibus	Nightwing: Rebirth; Nightwing (vol. 4) #1-49, Nightwing: Rebirth #1, Batgirl #14-17, Batman #7-8, Batman: Prelude to the Wedding: Nightwing vs. Hush #1, Detective Comics #941-942, Green Arrow #32, Red Hood and the Outlaws Annual #1, Suicide Squad #26, Teen Titans #12 and stories from Batgirl #25, DC Rebirth Holiday Special #1 and Robin 80th Anniversary 100-Page Super Spectacular #1	#188-236	Omnibus	1,496	Apr 22, 2025	978-1799501169
	Nightwing by Tom Taylor and Bruno Redondo Omnibus Vol. 1	Nightwing (vol. 4) #78-96; Batman: Urban Legends #10; Nightwing Annual 2021; Superman: Son of Kal-El #9	#265-287	Omnibus	624	Jul 22, 2025	978-1799502197
	Nightwing by Tom Taylor Omnibus Vol. 2	Nightwing (vol. 4) #101-118; Nightwing Annual 2022	#288-305	Omnibus	600	Jul 7, 2026	978-1799508502

Prestige one-shots

- Nightwing: The Target
- Batman/Nightwing: Bloodborne

=== Other collected editions ===
Title	Material collected	Format	Released	ISBN
Batman: Cataclysm	Nightwing (vol. 2) #19-20	TPB	Jun 1999	978-1563895272
Batman: Cataclysm	Nightwing (vol. 2) #19-20	TPB	Jun 16, 2015	978-1401255152
Batman: No Man's Land Vol. 2	Nightwing (vol. 2) #35-37	TPB	Apr 17, 2012	978-1401233808
Batman: New Gotham, Vol. 2: Officer Down	Nightwing (vol. 2) #53	TPB	Aug 2001	978-1563897870
Batman: Bruce Wayne: Murderer?	Nightwing (vol. 2) #65-66	TPB	Aug 2002	978-1563899133
Batman: Bruce Wayne: Murderer?	Nightwing (vol. 2) #65-66, 68–69	TPB	May 20, 2014	978-1401246839
Batman: Bruce Wayne: Fugitive Vol. 1	Nightwing (vol. 2) #68-69	TPB	Dec 2002	978-1563899331
Batman War Games Book 1	Nightwing (vol. 2) #96	TPB	Nov 3, 2015	978-1401258139
Batman War Games Book 2	Nightwing (vol. 2) #97-98	TPB	May 24, 2016	978-1401260705
Batman: The Resurrection Of Ra's al Ghul	Nightwing (vol. 2) #138-139	HC	May 20, 2008	978-1401217853
Batman: The Resurrection Of Ra's al Ghul	Nightwing (vol. 2) #138-139	TPB	May 12, 2009	978-1401220327
Batman: Night Of The Owls	Nightwing (vol. 3) #8-9	HC	Feb 19, 2013	978-1401237738
Batman: Night Of The Owls	Nightwing (vol. 3) #8-9	TPB	Nov 12, 2013	978-1401242527
The Joker: Death Of The Family	Nightwing (vol. 3) #15-16	HC	Oct 22, 2013	978-1401242350
The Joker: Death Of The Family	Nightwing (vol. 3) #15-16	TPB	Apr 22, 2014	978-1401246464
Dark Nights: The Road To Metal	Nightwing (vol. 4) #17	HC	May 22, 2018	978-1401278199
Dark Nights: The Road To Metal	Nightwing (vol. 4) #17	TPB	Jan 8, 2019	978-1401278199
Dark Nights: Metal: The Resistance	Nightwing (vol. 4) #29	TPB	Jul 3, 2018	978-1401282981

== See also ==
- Batman (comic book)
- Batgirl (comic book)
- Robin (comic book)
- List of DC Comics imprints
