= Dick Grayson =

DC Comics superhero

- Various incarnations of Dick Grayson from variant cover of Nightwing #118 (September 2024). Art by Nicola Scott.

Publication information
- Publisher: DC Comics
- First appearance: As Robin: Detective Comics #38 (April 1940); As Nightwing: Tales of the Teen Titans #44 (July 1984); As Batman: Robin #0 (October 1994); As Target: Nightwing: The Target #1 (September 2001); As Agent 37: Grayson #1 (July 2014)
- Created by: Bill Finger; Bob Kane; Jerry Robinson

In-story information
- Full name: Richard John Grayson
- Species: Human
- Team affiliations: Justice League; Teen Titans; Outsiders; Batman Incorporated; Spyral
- Partnerships: Batman; Oracle; Arsenal; The Flash; Donna Troy; Starfire; Vigilante; Tim Drake; Jason Todd (assisted as Robin and Red Hood); Damian Wayne (served as Robin to Dick's Batman)
- Notable aliases: Robin; Nightwing; Batman; Agent 38
- Abilities: Peak human physical condition; Genius-level intellect; Master strategist, tactician, and field commander; Master detective; Master acrobat, gymnast, and aerialist; Master martial artist, hand-to-hand combatant, and stick fighter; Proficient in using various high-tech equipment and weapons

Richard John "Dick" Grayson is a superhero appearing in American comic books published by DC Comics, commonly in association with Batman, the Teen Titans, and the Justice League. Created by writer Bill Finger and artists Bob Kane and Jerry Robinson, he first appeared in Detective Comics #38 in April 1940. Dick is the original and most popular incarnation of Robin, the crime-fighting partner of Batman, with whom he forms the Dynamic Duo. The son of master acrobats dubbed the Flying Graysons, he is later adopted by Batman's alter ego Bruce Wayne.

Dick Grayson's character has evolved since he was introduced in 1940. In 1984, he graduated from the role of Robin to become the adult superhero Nightwing, protector of the city of Blüdhaven, an economically troubled neighbor of Gotham City. As Bruce's eldest adoptive son, Dick has become an older-brother figure to his male successors as Robin: tearaway Jason Todd, teenage prodigy Tim Drake, and Batman's biological child, trained assassin Damian Wayne. In the Batman Family, his closest relationships are with Batman's loyal butler and father figure Alfred Pennyworth, and with one of his major romantic interests Barbara Gordon, who served as Batgirl alongside Dick, and who later helps Nightwing as Oracle. Dick has also taken up the mantle of Batman on occasions when Bruce was missing, incapacitated, or believed dead.

Dick is well-connected to other characters across the fictional DC Universe, particularly since 1964, when he became a founding member of the Teen Titans superhero group with other sidekicks of the Justice League. Teen Titans establishes many of the character's most significant partnerships, including with his best friends Wally West (Kid Flash), Donna Troy (Wonder Girl), and Roy Harper (Speedy), and his other major romantic interest, the Tamaranean princess Starfire. Dick is widely recognised as one of the superhero community's greatest strategists, leading the adult Titans team, the Outsiders, and even the Justice League at various times. Dick also has connections to the Superman franchise, with Superman providing the original inspiration for him to become Nightwing and take on a different style of superheroism from Batman, with Nightwing later mentoring Superman's son Jon Kent.

Grayson has appeared as Robin in many Batman adaptations over the years. In live-action, the character appeared in the serial Batman played by Douglas Croft, the serial Batman and Robin played by Johnny Duncan, the television series Batman and its film played by Burt Ward, the film Batman Forever and its sequel Batman & Robin played by Chris O'Donnell, and the television series Titans played by Brenton Thwaites.

== Publication history ==
=== Robin the Boy Wonder ===
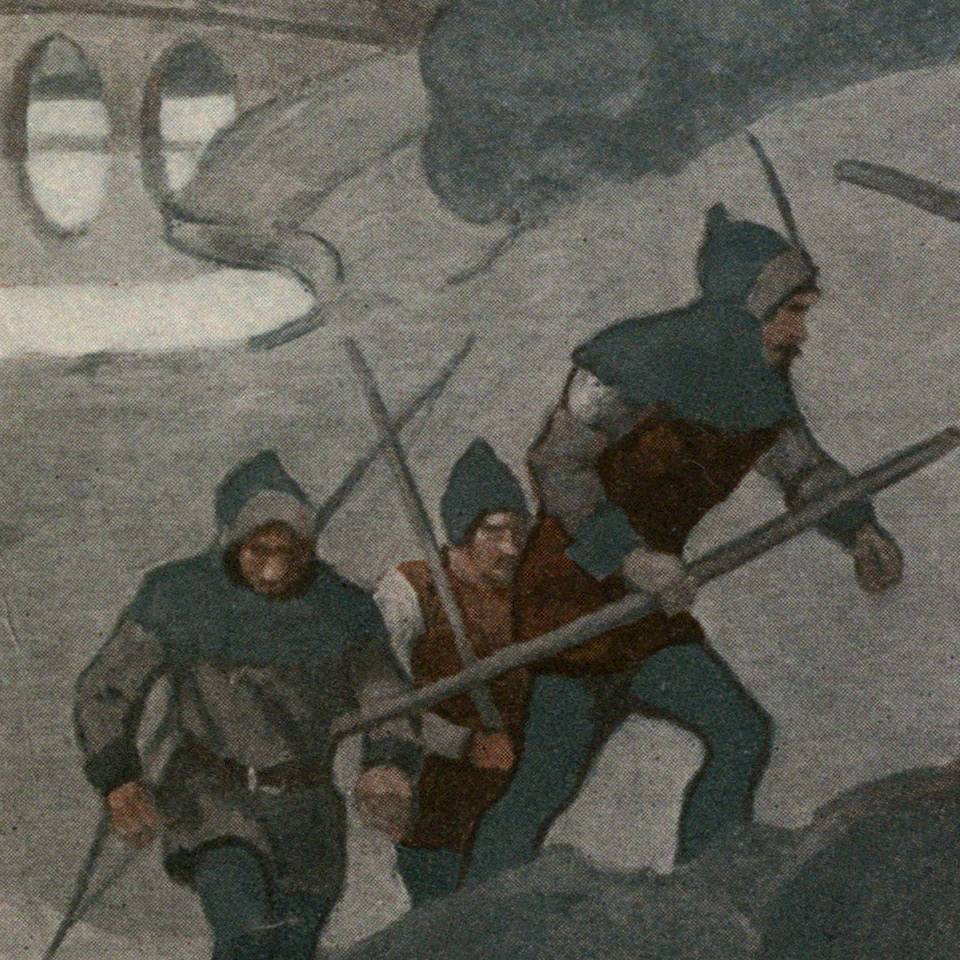
Characters from an illustration by N. C. Wyeth for "Robin Hood" (1917) by Paul Creswick. The look inspired Jerry Robinson's design for Robin.

The character was first introduced in Detective Comics #38 (1940) by Batman creators Bill Finger and Bob Kane. Robin's debut was an effort to get younger readers to enjoy Batman. The name "Robin, The Boy Wonder" and the medieval look of the original costume are inspired by the legendary hero Robin Hood. Finger had named Dick Grayson after both the half-brother of pulp fiction character Frank Merriwell, named Dick, and book editor Charles Grayson, Jr. The costume was designed by Jerry Robinson who drew it from memory based on Robin Hood illustrations by N. C. Wyeth.

In his first appearance, Dick Grayson is an 8 year-old circus acrobat, and, with his parents, one of the "Flying Graysons". Robin was born on the first day of spring, the son of John Grayson and Mary Grayson, a young aerialist couple. While preparing for a performance, Dick overhears two gangsters attempting to extort protection money from the circus owner. The owner refuses, so the gangsters sabotage the trapeze wires with acid. During the next performance, the trapeze from which Dick's parents are swinging snaps, sending them to their deaths. Before he can go to the police, Batman appears to him and warns him that the two gangsters work for Tony Zucco, a very powerful crime boss, and that revealing his knowledge could lead to his death. When Batman recounts the murder of his own parents, Dick asks to become his aide. After extensive training, Dick becomes Robin. They start by disrupting Zucco's gambling and extortion rackets. They then successfully bait the riled Zucco into visiting a construction site, where they capture him.

Robin's origin has a thematic connection to Batman's in that both see their parents killed by criminals, creating an urge to battle the criminal element. Bruce sees a chance to direct the anger and rage that Dick feels in a way that he cannot, thus creating a father/son bond and understanding between the two. Throughout the 1940s and 1950s, DC Comics portrayed Batman and Robin as a team, deeming them the "Dynamic Duo", rarely publishing a Batman story without his sidekick; stories entirely devoted to Robin appeared in Star-Spangled Comics from 1947 through 1952.

The character history of the Earth-Two Robin accordingly adopts all of the earliest stories featuring the character from the 1940s and 1950s, while the adventures of the mainstream Robin (who lived on "Earth-One") begin later and with certain elements of his origin retold. However, during the Earth-Two stories, the age that Dick became Robin changed to 13 during the 1950s. Both were depicted as separate, though parallel, individuals living in their respective universes, with the "older" Earth-Two character eventually reaching death in Crisis on Infinite Earths.

==== Teen Titans ====
1964's The Brave and the Bold #54 introduces a junior version of the Justice League of America. This team is led by the modern-day Robin, residing on Earth-One, and was joined by two other teenage sidekicks, Aqualad (sidekick of Aquaman) and Kid Flash (sidekick of the Flash), to stop the menace of Mr. Twister. Later, the three sidekicks join forces with Speedy (sidekick of Green Arrow) and Wonder Girl to free their mentors in the JLA from mind-controlled thrall. They decide to become a real team: the Teen Titans. By the tactical skills gleaned from Batman, Robin is swiftly recognized as a leader before the Titans disband some years later.

In 1969, still in the Pre-Crisis continuity, writer Dennis O'Neil and artist Neal Adams return Batman to his darker roots. One part of this effort is writing Robin out of the series by sending Dick Grayson to Hudson University and into a separate strip in the back of Detective Comics. The by-now Teen Wonder appears only sporadically in Batman stories of the 1970s as well as in a short-lived revival of The Teen Titans.

==== New Teen Titans, New Titans, Tales of Teen Titans (1980-1996) ====
In October 1980, a new roster of the Teen Titans was featured in DC Comics Presents #26 featuring Robin, Wonder Girl, and Kid Flash. Given a series of their starring writer Marv Wolfman and artist George Pérez, later additions to the team would include Changeling (Beast Boy), Raven, Cyborg, and Starfire. The New Teen Titans are run by Marv Wolfman, George Perez, and editor Len Wein. With Marvel outperforming DC Comics in sales, the then-new President of DC Comics Jenette Khan brought in the aforementioned team who would choose to use the Teen Titans characters in a bid to revitalize sales. During the comic's run, the series was among DC's best-selling books. outperforming much of the other titles featuring more popular characters. During Robin's leadership of the Titans, however, he had a falling out with Batman, leading to an estrangement that would last for years.

=== Nightwing ===
In the pre-Crisis on Infinite Earths continuity, the maturing Dick Grayson grows weary of his role as Batman's young sidekick. He renames himself Nightwing, recalling his adventure in the Kryptonian city of Kandor, where he and Batman meet the local hero of the same name. In post-Crisis continuity, he is fired by Batman after being shot by the Joker and becomes Nightwing. He maintains this identity during his role in the Teen Titans and occasionally returns to assist Batman and his successors as Robin in the form of Jason Todd and Tim Drake, Tim, in particular, becoming a younger brother figure to him.

When Bruce's back is broken by Bane during the Knightfall story arc, Bruce selects Jean-Paul Valley as his replacement as Batman as he does not want to burden Dick with the role and fears that Dick may go after Bane in revenge. When Valley proves to be too unstable to be Batman, however, Bruce undergoes a rigorous recovery and training program with the aid of Doctor Shondra Kinsolving and Lady Shiva to restore him to full health, defeating Valley with Dick and Tim's aid. Feeling that he needs to re-evaluate Batman and his mission after Valley's defeat, however, Bruce leaves Gotham once again, after appointing Dick as his successor during the "Prodigal" story arc. While acting as Batman, Dick is left with a clearer idea of the psychological stresses Bruce must endure in the role, as well as facing some of Bruce's newer enemies—such as Killer Croc, the Ventriloquist, and the Ratcatcher—while settling his long-standing issues with Two-Face.

==== Miniseries and afterward ====
In Nightwing: Alfred's Return #1 (1995), Dick Grayson travels to England to find Alfred Pennyworth who had resigned from Bruce Wayne's service following the events of the KnightSaga. Before returning to Gotham City together, they prevent an attempted coup d'état against the British government that involves destroying the Channel Tunnel under the English Channel.

Later on, with the Nightwing miniseries (September to December 1995, written by Dennis O'Neil with Greg Land as an artist), Dick briefly considers retiring from being Nightwing forever before family papers uncovered by Alfred reveals a possible link between the murder of the Flying Graysons and the Crown Prince of Kravis. Journeying to Kravis, Nightwing helps to topple the murderous Kravian leader and prevent ethnic cleansing, while learning his parents' true connection to the Prince; they witnessed the original Prince being killed and replaced with an impostor who became as bad as his predecessor (although Zucco killed the Graysons before the conspirators could do anything about it). In the aftermath, Dick returns to his role as Nightwing, recognizing that, for all his problems with Bruce, Bruce never made him become Robin or join his crusade, accepting that he imitated Bruce's example because Bruce was worthy of imitation.

In 1996, following the success of the miniseries, DC Comics launched a monthly solo series featuring Nightwing (written by Chuck Dixon, with art by Scott McDaniel), in which he patrols Gotham City's neighboring municipality of Blüdhaven, relocating there to investigate a series of murders and remaining as he recognized that the city needed protection. He remains the city's guardian for some time, facing foes such as Blockbuster and new villains such as Torque, and even becomes a police officer so that he can make an impact on the city's criminal activity in both parts of his life. Later, Grayson divides his duties between Blüdhaven and Gotham after a devastating earthquake and the subsequent decision to declare Gotham a No Man's Land, Grayson occasionally assisting his mentor and other members of Bat-Family in maintaining and restoring order in Gotham until it is fully rebuilt. When the Justice League vanished into the past fighting an ancient sorceress Gamemnae, Nightwing was selected as the leader of the reserve League created by an emergency program Batman had established in the event of his League being defeated; Batman described Nightwing as the only person he could have picked to lead the new team.

Eventually, the original League is restored, and Nightwing departs along with some of his League - although others remain as some of the original team take a leave of absence - though Batman notes that his leadership of the League proves that he is ready for more responsibilities. The death of Blockbuster, however, prompts Nightwing to leave Blüdhaven due to his crisis of conscience; Blockbuster was killed by a vigilante Tarantula, and Nightwing did not stop this even when he had the chance because he was in a depressive state after Blockbuster repeatedly attacked his loved ones. This caused him to have an anxiety attack that put him in a near catatonic state, which Tarantula took advantage of and sexually assaulted him. While Nightwing returns to Gotham to heal after assisting Batman in dealing with a series of gang wars, Blüdhaven is destroyed by the Secret Society of Super-Villains when they drop Chemo on it.

During the battle of Metropolis, Grayson suffers a near-fatal injury from Alexander Luthor Jr. when he shields Wayne from Luthor's attack. Originally, the editors at DC intended to have Grayson killed in Infinite Crisis as Newsarama revealed from the DC Panel at WizardWorld Philadelphia:

It was again explained that Nightwing was originally intended to die in Infinite Crisis, and that you can see the arc that was supposed to end with his death in the series. After long discussions, the death edict was finally reversed, but the decision was made that, if they were going to be keeping him, he would have to be changed. The next arc of the ongoing series will further explain the changes, it was said.

After spending some time away with Bruce and Tim to heal and rebuild after their harsh times before the Crisis, Dick relocates to New York but has trouble finding work as both Dick Grayson and Nightwing. During the Batman R.I.P. storyline, Nightwing is ambushed by the International Club of Villains. He is later seen being held in Arkham Asylum, where one of the surgeons, in reality also the civilian identity of ICoV member Le Bossu, arranged for Nightwing to be admitted under the name of Pierrot Lunaire (another ICoV member) and be kept both heavily drugged and regularly beaten by staff to subdue him. Scheduled for an experimental lobotomy by Le Bossu himself, he manages to free himself and come to Batman's aid for the finale of the story arc.

=== Batman: Reborn ===
Following the events of Batman's apparent death during the Final Crisis, Nightwing closes down shop in New York City to return to Gotham, where – after the events of "Battle for the Cowl" – he, initially reluctant, assumes the identity of Batman and finds a new Robin in Damian Wayne, Bruce Wayne's biological son. In the stories that followed tended to feature Grayson reckoning with themes of identity, family, loss, history and legacy, as he established himself as a different kind of Batman; more concerned with inspiring hope than fear.

The new team of Batman and Robin is the focus of Grant Morrison and Frank Quitely's Batman and Robin series. Their dynamic reverses the classic dynamic of Bruce and Dick, by having a lighter and friendlier Batman paired with a more intense and dark Robin.

During this period, Dick Grayson as Batman also features as the leader of the Justice League, joined by former Titans and Outsiders teammates Donna Troy, Jesse Quick and Jade, in a run by the writer James Robinson. After an intense confrontation with the Club of Villains and Simon Hurt (who has established fake evidence that he is Bruce's father Thomas Wayne), Hurt is defeated when Bruce returns to the present. However, Bruce leaves Dick to continue to act as Batman in Gotham with Damian as his partner while he sets up the new 'Batman Incorporated' program, Bruce publicly identifying himself as Batman's financial backer to justify a global Batman-themed operation where he funds multiple other vigilantes.

=== The New 52 (2011–2016) ===
Dick Grayson is re-established as Nightwing following DC's Flashpoint crossover event, after which the publisher relaunched all of its titles and made alterations to its continuity as part of an initiative called The New 52. In the new status quo, Bruce Wayne is once again the only Batman, and Dick, like the other members of the adoptive family, is a few years younger. Dick, despite being 19 is drawn a bit shorter than in his pre-relaunch frame. This is likely due to adding believability to his acrobat past. His origin story remains the same (Bruce Wayne takes him in upon his parents' murder by Zucco) except that Dick prodigiously talented at reading body language, allowing him to deduce Batman's secret identity upon their first meeting.

According to various interviews it is stated that Dick was adopted at 16 as opposed to as an adult due to the DCNU's timeline existing for only five years. Dick Grayson is shown in flashbacks as Robin with a revamped version of the Robin costume in Nightwing (vol. 3) #0 (November 2012) and Batman and Robin (vol. 2) Annual #2 (March 2014).

Dick Grayson in his New 52 Robin costume from Batman and Robin (vol. 2) Annual #2 (March 2014). Art by Doug Mahnke and Patrick Gleason

In his civilian identity, he is attacked by an assassin named Saiko who insists that he is the fiercest killer in Gotham. The series Batman Incorporated relaunches with a second volume, continuing its story while taking into account the New 52's continuity changes; Dick is now depicted as Nightwing, and not as Batman, but the change is not addressed in the comic itself. In Nightwing, Dick inherits the deed to the circus from a dying Jack Haly and begins a relationship with his childhood friend acrobat Raya Vestri. Saiko tortures Haly for information on Nightwing's secret identity, and the old man dies in Dick's arms after telling him the circus holds a terrible secret. Investigating leads, he tracks down a supervillain named Feedback, who used to be a childhood friend but does not learn anything. Following Haly's clues, he finds a mysterious Book of Names in the circus that has his name on the last page. Later the circus announces they will be doing a memorial show on the anniversary of the night Dick's parents were murdered, and Saiko attacks by detonating a massive explosion.

It is then revealed that the circus has been training assassins for years, and Saiko was a childhood friend using Raya as an accomplice. Grayson had been selected to become a new Talon for the Court of Owls, but when Batman adopted him, Saiko took his place. The killer plummets to his death and Raya turns herself in. Returning to the Batcave, Bruce reveals to Dick that the current Talon is his great-grandfather William Cobb. During the "Night of the Owls" event, Dick faces Cobb, who was revived while protecting Mayor Hady. Following the event, Dick decided to keep Haly's Circus in Gotham and plans to invest in turning an abandoned amusement park into their new location without Bruce's money. He works with Sonia Branch, the daughter of Tony Zucco, the crime boss who murdered Dick's parents, into getting a loan for this plan by investing his entire trust fund despite being a high-risk due to Saiko's recent attack. The problems arise because of the guilt Sonia feels towards her father's actions and many members of the circus are afraid for their lives because of the previous disasters and accuse Dick Grayson of being a flake, making it hard for those who choose to stay.

The "Death of the Family" crossover event across the Batman-related comic books led to a major shift in Nightwing's status quo. During the storyline, one of Dick's friends Jimmy Clark, who worked as a circus clown, was murdered by the Joker because Joker felt like Jimmy was a knockoff of him. Nightwing later discovers Joker broke Raya out of prison, infected her with his Joker venom, and forced her to fight him while wearing a makeshift Nightwing costume. The toxin eventually killed Raya, though Nightwing tried in vain with an anti-toxin to save her. Nightwing then discovered that Joker left a message on Raya's abdomen that he was targeting Haly's Circus next. However upon arriving there, Joker unveils his plan to burn the circus to the ground and then infects Nightwing with his gas which not only causes him to experience hallucinations of Jimmy and Raya but he is soon attacked by the other members of Haly's Circus that were also affected by the toxin allowing Joker to capture him.

In the aftermath, Haly's Circus is gone, with Dick breaking as a result of having lost his investment. While the other circus members survived since Joker used a different Joker venom on them, they blame Dick and decide to leave after Raya and Jimmy's funeral, though deep down they know it is not his fault. Dick becomes bitter about his loss. After he used excessive force to bring down some criminals that tried to plunder valuables from the remains of the circus, Damian, who has been monitoring him, can talk some sense into Nightwing, which helps him recover.

Nightwing is later deeply affected by the death of Damian following his murder at the hands of Damian's clone, the Heretic, in Batman Incorporated. With Damian's death and potential resurrection becoming an obsession of Batman's, Dick is shunned by Bruce when he tries to tell him to move on, in Batman and Nightwing (a retitled Batman & Robin #23).

Later, the Nightwing series changes its setting to Chicago, Illinois. Sonia Branch reveals to Dick an e-mail that indicates that her father Zucco is still alive. After giving the address to Red Robin to try to track down who sent it, Robin uncovers that Zucco is residing in Chicago. Nightwing moves to Chicago to find and arrest Zucco, who is now living under the assumed identity of Billy Lester, an assistant to the mayor. Soon after arriving in Chicago, Dick meets his new roommates, a photojournalist named Michael and a computer specialist named Joey. After leaving the apartment to meet with Johnny Spade, a borderline criminal who steals and sells information, their meeting is interrupted by the police. A short chase results in the accidental destruction of a newly rebuilt subway. Meanwhile, a criminal hacker called the Prankster tortures, maims, and kills criminal con men who are untouchable by the police.

The Chicago story is later abruptly ended by Nightwing's role in a larger company-wide crossover event. After the Crime Syndicate invades Earth-Prime after the "Trinity War" Justice League storyline and defeats the Justice League, the DC crossover story Forever Evil depicts Nightwing's capture by the Crime Syndicate, who exposes his secret identity to the world. Following their escape from the Syndicate, Batman and Catwoman decide to rescue him. He then is invited by Owlman to help defeat the Crime Syndicate, which he accepts. Nightwing is severely beaten by Ultraman and is attached to a device from a parallel world known as the Murder Machine, which is controlled by his heart rate and is reportedly impossible to escape from alive. When Batman and Lex Luthor arrive to free him, Lex stops his heart to fool the system so he can disarm it. However, Batman, enraged over what Lex has done, attacks him. Luthor explains it is not too late to save Grayson. In an uncharacteristically heroic moment, Luthor injects Grayson's heart with adrenaline, which successfully revives Grayson. Cyborg enters, having defeated Grid, and Grayson joins Batman, Cyborg, and Catwoman in freeing the Justice League from the Firestorm Matrix.

After the defeat of the Syndicate, Grayson is seen with Batman in the Batcave. Batman tells him that he has to send him on the most dangerous mission he could undertake, requiring that Grayson fakes his death. Upon the latter's refusal (saying he cannot do that to his family), the two have an all-out brawl during which Batman tells him Spyral is in possession of multiple secret identities and could kill his friends and family. As Bruce monologues about knowing the magnitude of what he's asking, Dick reiterates his refusal to keep his survival from his family. He finally gains the upper hand, winning the fight. However, Dick's pyrrhic victory brings him no satisfaction as he feels compelled to take on the mission, even as he tells Bruce, "if you make me do this, things can never be the same with us again."

==== Grayson ====
The Nightwing title concluded in April 2014 at issue #30, and was replaced with a new title, Grayson, which depicts Dick having given up his life as Nightwing at age 22 and going undercover as an agent of the Spyral organization where the former Batwoman Kathy Kane works. Written by Tim Seeley and former CIA counter-terrorism officer Tom King, the career change for Dick Grayson comes from the urging of Batman himself, who convinces him to remain dead to the world. Seeley stated that the series will be "leaning into" Grayson's sex symbol status. The character's look also is redesigned with no mask, but a blue-and-black outfit calling back to his pre-New 52 Nightwing counterpart with an addition of a "G" on his chest, said to be reminiscent of the Robin "R".

In the "Agent of Spyral" storyline, Dick (known as Agent 37) is enlisted by Mister Minos, the director of Spyral, after having been chosen by Helena Bertinelli to serve as a new candidate. However, Dick serves as a mole under Batman due to their agenda of unmasking heroes by collecting the Paragon organs, organs which contain the DNA of the Justice League and bestows meta-bioweapons the ability to use their powers. He assists Spyral's agenda to know more about Minos and his endgame, resulting in Spyral attaining most of the scattered organs. In a later story arc, Minos betrays Spyral and attempts to leak its secrets. To his surprise, he finds the new Agent Zero, who reveals that she, along with the upper echelon of Spyral, had used Minos to attract Dick into Spyral and kills Minos as he has outlived his life full of humor.

During Batman and Robin Eternal, Grayson finds himself working with various other members of the Bat-Family when Bruce Wayne is amnesiac after his resurrection against the ruthless villain known only as "Mother", who, it is revealed, briefly met with Batman early in Grayson's career as Robin, believing that he shared her views on using trauma to make people stronger. Mother intends to trigger a global collapse with the reasoning that the survivors will rebuild a stronger world after being broken by tragedy and without the hindrance of parents to force their ideals on them, but Grayson and the rest of the Family can defeat her, Dick affirming that Batman helps the Robins become their people who can avoid the mistakes he made in dealing with his trauma rather than Mother's belief that she and Batman each teach people to use their trauma to define themselves. After the storyline, Dick meets with the restored Batman, assuring Bruce that, unlike Mother, he never forced his ideas on them, but simply gave them all an example that they chose to emulate while avoiding following it so exactly that they became like him.

When the Court of Owls plant a bomb inside Damian Wayne, they can blackmail Dick into officially joining their organization, although all sides are aware that Grayson intends to try to use his new position against them. The Grayson series ended in issue #20, wherein the final issue, it was revealed that all knowledge of Dick's identity was erased from most of the world with one of Spyral's satellites, allowing Dick to resume his superhero activities as Nightwing once again.

=== DC Rebirth ===
Starting with the DC Rebirth relaunch in 2016, Dick returned to being Nightwing with his black and blue costume, his Spyral contacts having wiped all global evidence of his dual identity and the bomb removed from Damian. He uses his new skills and expertise in espionage moving forward. Nightwing is prominently featured in two Rebirth books: the fourth volume of Nightwing, his solo book, and Titans, where Dick teams up with the other original Teen Titans after Wally West returns to the universe; through Wally, Dick remembers events of his life before Flashpoint and The New 52. After the Titans are forcibly disbanded by the Justice League, Dick creates a new Titans team after the rupture of the Source Wall consisting of Donna Troy, Raven, Steel (Natasha Irons), Beast Boy, and Miss Martian.

In his solo book, Dick is paired with a vigilante named Raptor and the two plan to bring down the Court of Owls from the inside. Barbara criticizes Dick's willingness to trust him and does not agree with his methods. Though Raptor seemed willing to play by Dick's rules of not killing, he tricks Dick into agreeing to a plan that results in the deaths of all of the Parliament of Owls in Sydney. After knocking Dick out, Raptor goes to Gotham and kidnaps Bruce during a conference. Nightwing confronts him alone in the ruins of a circus in Paris. Raptor reveals that he grew up in the circus as a child and fell in love with Dick's mother, Mary, as they stole from the rich and powerful in Paris. Raptor watched over Dick in the shadows as he grew up, and developed a hatred for Bruce Wayne as he represented everything he and Mary were against and felt it was dishonoring her memory to have Dick raised by him. Dick defeats Raptor and rescues Bruce in time.

After joining forces with the pre-Flashpoint Superman to defeat the latest attack of Doctor Destiny, Dick contemplates checking out Blüdhaven, based on Superman's reference to how the pre-Flashpoint Grayson acted as the city's guardian for a time, and ultimately decides to go there. While there he meets a supervillain rehabilitation group called the Run-Offs, all of which were villains he and Batman defeated in the past. He finds that most of them are being framed for crimes around the area and works with them to find the true culprits. After solving the case and clearing their names, Dick begins dating their leader Shawn Tsang, known as the former criminal the Defacer. Shawn is kidnapped by Professor Pyg after Dick discovers she might be pregnant with his child, and he teams up with Damian to track Pyg down and rescue her. After Shawn is revealed not to be pregnant, she ultimately breaks up with Dick, who focuses his efforts on taking down criminals such as Blockbuster, the returning Raptor, the Judge, and Wyrm.

During one of his nightly patrols with Batman, Nightwing is shot by KGBeast and nearly killed. As a result, he suffered from severe memory loss and attempted to build a new life in Blüdhaven. He changed his name to Ric, gave up being Nightwing, and became a taxi driver that frequently went to bars. With Blüdhaven suffering from an increase in crime from the vigilante's absence, a detective named Sapienza comes across Dick's abandoned hideout in the subway and decides to become the new Nightwing. Sapienza recruits a team of his friends in law enforcement to help him, and together they make a team of Nightwings using Dick Grayson's old uniforms. In addition to Sapienza, the team consists of Malcolm Hutch, the deputy chief in the Blüdhaven fire department, Zak Edwards, the vice of the 10th precinct, and Colleen Edwards, detective of the 14th precinct.

During Year of the Villain, Ric is captured by William Cobb, his grandfather who is a Talon. A brain surgeon that Bruce hired to take care of Dick after he was shot named Dr. Haas was secretly a member of the Court, who was using a mystical memory crystal to alter Dick's memories and eventually shape him into becoming a Talon himself. William Cobb forces Ric to wear goggles and puts Dick under his spell. As a Talon, Grayson fights off other Nightwing heroes. A Nightwing hero name Connor Red shoots at Grayson's mask, making his eye visible. Connor Red pleads for mercy saying he has a family, and as the sun comes up Dick Grayson suddenly breaks out of his grandfather's control. Dick Grayson starts to remember his adventures as Nightwing. Ric defeats Talon, and saves his girlfriend Bea. Afterwards, he journeys to Switzerland to learn more answers about his past from Dr. Haas, who attempts to use the crystal to alter his memories once more. However, an explosion seemingly sends her down a river to her death while Ric can retrieve the memory crystal she used on him. During the "Joker War" storyline, the Joker steals the memory crystal and uses it to brainwash Grayson into believing he is the Joker's adopted son, "Dicky Boy" and turns him against the Bat Family in his latest war against Batman. After Barbara gets the crystal back, Bea uses it to allow him to fully regain his memories as Dick Grayson.

==== Infinite Frontier ====
Returning to his role as Blüdhaven's protector, Grayson is informed by Barbara Gordon that he has been bequeathed a fortune by Alfred Pennyworth, accumulated during his years of service to the Wayne family. He decides to use this newfound wealth to establish a philanthropic foundation to revitalize Blüdhaven, while continuing to fight corruption and crime as Nightwing. In both efforts, he is opposed by Blockbuster as well as a new villain, Heartless, who steals peoples' hearts to sustain his own life. He is supported by Barbara, who reclaims her mantle as Batgirl; Tim Drake, once again operating as Robin; the Titans; Jon Kent, who is publicly operating as Superman in his father's absence; and two unexpected new allies: the new mayor of Blüdhaven, who is his previously unknown half-sister, and a three-legged pit bull puppy whom Grayson adopts, naming her "Haley" (although Drake immediately dubs her "Bitewing").

== Character overview ==
=== Characterization ===
==== Reputation and reception ====
Throughout his publication history, Grayson's reputation and prowess has been emphasized in various fields; the character's detective and investigative abilities has been remarked to be second to Batman and considered one of the best crime fighters on Earth. He also has been expressed to have leadership abilities surpassing his mentor, second to Superman in trustworthiness in the superhero community within the DC Universe, and Batman's most proficient former protege trained in unarmed combat. However, his reception and reputation have sometimes varied.

=== Romances ===
==== Barbara Gordon ====
Dick Grayson's second major love interest was Barbara Gordon. The daughter of Gotham City police commissioner Jim Gordon, Barbara Gordon debuted as Batgirl in Detective Comics #359 (January 1967). She and Dick shared their first kiss in Batman Family #1 (October 1975), when she was a congresswoman and he was working as her congressional aid. Their relationship was initially quite controversial, as Babs was in her mid-twenties and Dick was still a teenager. In Batman Family #13 (September 1977), Dick confessed his then-unreciprocated feelings for Babs while she appeared to be sleeping.

Following the events of Crisis on Infinite Earths, Dick and Babs's controversial age gap was retconned, as was Babs's past as a congresswoman. In Nightwing #38 (December 1999) Dick and Babs, now Nightwing and Oracle, shared their first kiss since the 1970s. Throughout the course of Chuck Dixon's Nightwing run they developed a serious relationship, before breaking up in Nightwing #87 (January 2004).

During Infinite Crisis in 2006, Dick proposed and Babs accepted. Their engagement ended amicably in Nightwing Annual #2 (June 2007). Despite the relatively low drama breakup, this issue remains controversial for its depiction of their relationship. Most notably, a flashback scene revealed that Dick had seduced Babs before inviting her to his wedding with his previous fiancée Koriand'r.

Beginning in the New 52 Dick and Babs's relationship was increasingly flirtatious. By the beginning of Tim Seeley's Nightwing run during DC Rebirth, they were casually dating. Following Batman and Catwoman's own failed engagement, Dick and Babs had a romantic getaway at the Kyle-Wayne honeymoon suite in Batgirl #25 (October 2018). With the beginning of Tom Taylor's run in Nightwing #78 (May 2021) Dick and Babs are in a serious relationship again, and adopted a three-legged pit bull puppy named Haley.

Despite their failed engagement, Dick and Babs have been married several times, including once in current continuity. In Batman Family #11 (June 1977) they staged a fake wedding to trap and arrest members of the criminal organization Maze. In the pre-Flashpoint universe limited series Convergence: Nightwing/Oracle, they wed after defeating an evil alternate universe Hawkman and Hawkwoman. Most recently they eloped during Dark Nights: Death Metal but the marriage was later annulled after neither of them died as previously anticipated.

==== Starfire ====
Dick Grayson's other major romantic love interest is his Teen Titans teammate Koriand'r, also known as Starfire. Following the break-up of the original Teen Titans in the 1970s, the New Teen Titans formed in 1980 after Raven came to Dick in a dream. At their first official meeting in New York City the team met Koriand'r, an alien princess turned refugee on the run from her slavers. Unable to speak English, Kory kissed Robin so that she could use her Tamaranian abilities to absorb his language via skin-to-skin contact. Despite this sparked first meeting, Dick initially rejected Kory's advances because he was dating the vampire Dala Vadim.

Dick and Kory's romantic tension began to build after Dick and Dala's relationship ended in Batman #351 (September 1982). In New Teen Titans #26 (December 1982) Dick confessed his feelings for Kory and they went on their first date. Their relationship was passionate and relatively easygoing for the next four years until New Teen Titans #17 (February 1986), where Kory was called back to her home planet Tamaran and forced into a political marriage with the Tamaranian prince Karras. Despite the marriage Kory eventually returned to Earth in New Teen Titans #34 (August 1987), where she and Dick reconciled. Kory's marriage formally ended in New Teen Titans Annual #6 when Karras died in a battle against alien terrorists.

Throughout the 1990s Dick and Kory began to encounter increasing relationship problems. These growing pains were further complicated in Team Titans #2 (October 1992) when the shapeshifter Mirage admitted to raping Dick while impersonating Kory. In New Titans #99 (July 1993) Dick proposed and Kory accepted. At their wedding in New Titans #100 (August 1993) Raven attacked Kory with a demonic seed, shattering her psyche. In her recovery from the attack, a Tamaranian healing ritual temporarily wiped Dick from Kory's memory. Their marriage was annulled in New Titans #112 (July 1994) when she regained her memory and the relationship formally ended in New Titans #114 (September 1994).

Dick and Kory have been teammates on several occasions since their failed marriage. They were both on the first renewal of the Titans team in the 1999 run, with Titans #19 (September 2000) revealing that they were still in love with one another. In 2003 Jade invited Kory onto Nightwing's Outsiders, where Kory and Dick had a sexual encounter in Outsiders #28 (November 2005). At the beginning of the 2008 Titans run Dick and Kory were dating again, but Dick ended the relationship in Titans #5 (October 2008). Teen Titans Academy #2 (June 2021) implied that their relationship was still sexual, but no longer romantic. Since 2022 they have returned to being just friends.

==== Other romantic interests ====
Before his first long-term relationship with Koriand'r in the 1980s, Dick Grayson's romances were sporadic, episodic, and often unrequited. For example, Dick had a brief crush on Alfred Pennyworth's niece Daphne Pennyworth in Batman #216 (November 1969). Other adolescent characters, like the first Bat-Girl (Bette Kane), harbored obvious crushes on Robin but he never reciprocated. While attending Hudson University in the 1970s Dick dated two classmates, Terri Bergstrom and Lori Elton, with both relationships ending within a year of the characters' first appearances.

In between his engagements to Koriand'r and Barbara Gordon he had several short-term love interests. During the events of Batman: No Man's Land, Nightwing and Huntress had a one-night stand in Nightwing/Huntress #3 (July 1998). Their brief fling was revisited in Nightwing #28 (February 1999) and Detective Comics #1050 (March 2022). Dick's inability to maintain romantic relationships has been a reoccurring source of conflict since the 1990s. Flashbacks in Nightwing #133 (August 2007) revealed that he had lost his virginity to Liu, an adult gang member affiliated with the mob boss "Metal Eddie" Huang, when he was seventeen years old. Narration implied that this was the source of his commitment issues, with Dick wondering "Is she why I've never been able to commit? Why it's so easy for me to say 'I love you...' but not 'I need you'?"

Beginning in Nightwing #71 (September 2002) Tarantula emerged as a frequent collaborator and one-sided love interest while Nightwing was establishing himself as the primary hero of Blüdhaven. Infamously Tarantula raped him in Nightwing #93 (July 2004) after killing Blockbuster. This issue was poorly received by fans and gained further notoriety after writer Devin Grayson controversially stated "I've never used the word 'rape'. I just said it was nonconsensual." (Devin Grayson has since retracted this statement and apologized.)

== Skill and abilities ==
Despite possessing no superpowers, Grayson's abilities and use of technology made him an effective crime fighter. He is trained as an aerialist, a skill developed through his early years as a circus acrobat and his training thereafter as Batman's protégé, Robin. While Batman is his primary source of combat foundations, he has also trained under Wildcat and Richard Dragon. He is a martial artist proficient in over half a dozen of disciplines, with Savate and Escrima cited as the preferred styles, alongside training in Judo, Aikido, Capoeira, Kung Fu, Jeet Kune Do, and Karate. He also holds a degree in forensic science and has been described as an expert in criminology and detective work.

A known superlative leader and tactician, Grayson is renowned for his trustworthy character among the superhero community in the DC Universe, having overseen numerous superhero teams. He is also skilled in reading the body language of others with acute attention to detail, able to mentally note discrepancies such as blink rates, underdeveloped skills, and signs of nervousness. He uses this skill in tandem with his leadership abilities. Grayson has also received extensive espionage training from Helena Bertinelli. Miscellaneous faculties among his repertoire of skills include disguise, computer hacking, and escape artistry.

=== Equipment and resources ===
The character's resources has varied overtime; due to his affiliation with Batman and connection to his alter-ego's wealth and companies (i.e WayneTech), Grayson's resources are frequently shared with his mentor and other members of the Batman family. In portrayals emphasizing his independence, the character has had a sizeable trust fund managed by financial expert Lucius Fox able to maintain his equipment, rights to Haly's Circus, and (covert) ownership of his apartment building in Blüdhaven. He has also once inherited a sizeable fortune from Alfred Pennyworth upon his death.

As Nightwing, he is typically armed with twin Eskrima sticks. He also carries several dozen modified batarangs (called wing-dings) along with de-cel jump lines and gas capsules.

==== Costumes ====
Dick Grayson's Robin costume alluded to the American robin and Robin Hood. The cape was alternately depicted as yellow or green. The costume also featured crakow-style shoes, which some artists would discard from the portrayal. Dick Grayson's Nightwing costume was made of a version of the Nomex fire-resistant, triple-weave Kevlar-lined material. It was excellent protection against damage and was also insulated against electricity. Specifically tailored to his style of fighting, Nightwing's costume had fewer body-armor inlays than Batman's, anticipating a decreased need for shock absorption and an increased capacity for motion. Against opponents, both fast and strong, Nightwing had supplemental body-armor overlays that he could attach to his gauntlets, boots, shoulders, and mask. Instead of a black cape to keep him hidden, which Grayson dislikes wearing, the suit was light-sensitive, darkening when there was more light in the area. The mask, in the form of his symbol, was fixed in place with spirit gum, and included a built-in radio transmitter/receiver and Starlite night vision lenses. The third costume, with its stylized blue "wing" across his shoulders and extending to his hands, coloring his two middle fingers over a black bodysuit, made its first appearance in Nightwing: Ties That Bind #2 (October 1995), and was designed by the cover artist Brian Stelfreeze. His suit was also equipped with wings that allow him to glide.

As Batman, his Batsuit featured a lighter cape to accommodate his more acrobatic fighting style and a utility belt with a bat-shaped buckle. He also developed "para-capes" for his and Damian's costumes which gave them the ability to glide. Grayson is noticeably shorter than Bruce Wayne.

Post-Flashpoint with his return to Nightwing, Dick wore a similar suit, albeit with the blue "wing" being red throughout the New 52. Previously in the New 52's continuity as Nightwing, he formerly owned an armored suit which was blue and yellow, resembling a modern take on his previous first costume in the previous continuity, and another that was an armored suit that sported a red bat symbol, which has been used by Jason Todd though slightly modified for Jason's taste. Formerly before having to leave the Nightwing mantle post Forever Evil, his suit was made up of sturdy but flexible material that not only suited his strength in speed and acrobatics but also was durable enough to take bullets from machine guns. His former costume was a stylized red "wing" across his shoulders and extending to his hands, coloring his two middle fingers over a black torso and legs. He also has gauntlets much like Batman's own suit. Nightwing's costume is tailored specifically to his unique style of crime-fighting. He also has variants of his costume in which one of his stylized red "wings" reach only to his shoulders, another to his wrists, and one which has hip and finger stripes.

Some versions of Dick's story as Nightwing do not make clear whether the public at large knows that the first Robin is now Nightwing, or whether he is simply an entirely new hero. A metafictional foreword (said to have been made by a future historian) to a trade paperback for "A Death In The Family" claimed that the public at large always thought there was just one Robin. In versions that do address it, Dick and Bruce seem to want to spread the belief that Nightwing started his career as an adult, the better to hide their true identities. The series Grayson seems to indicate that the public does not know, as Midnighter did not think to study Robin's techniques in preparation for his fight with Grayson, an advantage the latter exploited.

During his time as Agent 37 for Spyral, Dick uses identity-protection implants that ensure that neither cameras nor the memory of e.g. target persons can capture his face. He also was incorporated with a pair of hypnotic contact lenses which Dick used to mind control someone if they looked directly into his eye. Additionally, he still carries a pair of Escrima Sticks. He was required to carry a gun as part of Spyral protocol.

Starting with Rebirth, Dick returns to being Nightwing, once again in black and blue. The "wing" is replaced by a thinner, V-shaped bird that starts at the chest and goes up to the shoulders and around to the back. His domino mask is now blue instead of black. The shins and calves of his legs feature a big "swish" of blue. He wears a black leather strap and buckles on each of his forearms. This redesign intends to harken back to the iconic black-and-blue look of the third Nightwing costume introduced in 1995, maintain the simplicity of the aforementioned iconic look, creating a more visible-bird symbol, while also highlighting Dick's face with a lighter-colored mask and legs which can allow for more dynamic art when he is in motion.

== Other versions ==
=== Amalgam Comics ===
Moonwing, a composite character based on Dick Grayson and Moon Knight, appears in the Amalgam Comics imprint. This version is a S.H.I.E.L.D. agent who selected Jason Todd as his successor when he temporarily left S.H.I.E.L.D. to attend college. As Moonwing, Todd was presumed dead after being caught in an explosion. Todd's body was recovered by Hydra, who replaced his damaged body parts with robotic parts, transforming him into Deathlok.

=== Kingdom Come (Post-Infinite Crisis Earth 22) ===
In Kingdom Come, a middle-aged Dick Grayson reclaims the Robin mantle as Red Robin and takes over his mentor's position on the Justice League. He also has a daughter, Nightstar (Mar'i Grayson), with Starfire. Nightstar joins Batman's Outsiders and is romantically involved with his and Talia al Ghul's son, Ibn al Xu'ffasch.

=== JLA: The Nail and JLA: Another Nail ===
In JLA: The Nail, Dick Grayson (as Robin), along with Barbara Gordon (as Batgirl), is tortured to death by the Joker, driving Batman temporarily insane after he witnesses their ordeals and demise. The grief-stricken Batman kills Joker in revenge. In JLA: Another Nail, Dick returns as a spirit and helps Batman defeat the Joker after he escapes from Hell.

=== Batman Beyond ===
In the 2000 limited series Batman Beyond, Terry McGinnis faces a new incarnation of Hush, who is revealed to be a clone of Dick Grayson created by Project Cadmus. After Hush's defeat, Dick becomes a supporting character as Terry tries to protect his identity from a detective threatening to expose him. Meanwhile, Dick navigates a complicated relationship with Barbara Gordon, who had a past with Bruce Wayne and suffered a miscarriage. In Batman Beyond 2.0, Terry works under Dick, who emphasizes the importance of family. In the rebooted timeline, Dick is the mayor of Blüdhaven and has a daughter named Elaina, who becomes Batwoman.

=== Flashpoint ===
In the alternate timeline of the Flashpoint event, Dick Grayson is an acrobat in the Haley Circus alongside Boston Brand. After receiving a vision from Doctor Fate, Boston tries to persuade Dick to perform solo, but Dick prioritizes family over fame. During an attack by the Amazons, Dick's mother is injured and his father is fatally wounded, making Boston promise to protect Dick. After escaping the attack, Dick survives an explosion that kills Boston, who becomes a ghostly guide for him. Dick ultimately takes on the mantle of Doctor Fate, using his powers to defeat the Amazons, including Starfire, and realizing he is not alone.

=== Earth 2 (New 52) ===
On Earth 2, Dick Grayson is a journalist who is forced to live in a survival camp with his son John and his wife Barbara Gordon due to an invasion of Parademons. After the fatal shooting of his wife, the disappearance of his son, and the death of the second Batman, Dick becomes the third Batman of Earth 2 where he attempts to diminish crime following the end of Convergence. He is later reunited with John, who in turn becomes the new Robin of Earth 2. Later, Dick becomes a wheelchair user and adopts a new alias as Oracle while Helena Wayne becomes the fourth Batman with John fighting by her side as her Robin.

=== Injustice: Gods Among Us ===
In the alternate world of Injustice: Gods Among Us, Dick Grayson remains loyal to Batman's ideals while Superman adopts a more authoritarian approach to crime-fighting. When Superman plans to take control of Arkham Asylum, Dick joins Batman to stop him but is accidentally killed by Damian Wayne during a confrontation. This death strains Batman's relationship with Damian, leading Bruce to declare Dick as his true son. In subsequent stories, Dick's spirit is called upon by Deadman, allowing him to investigate events from beyond the grave. He expresses no regrets about his life and shares a bond of love with Bruce. As the story progresses, Dick returns to watch over Damian, recognizing the young hero's potential but also his reckless behavior.

=== Superman/Batman: Generations ===
Dick Grayson is first seen going off to college in a scene set in 1949, after working with Batman for almost ten years, going on to become a lawyer in New York. At some point between 1959 and 1969, Dick takes on the mantle of Batman with Bruce Wayne Jr. as Robin after Bruce is forced to retire due to old age. Dick is killed by the Joker's latest scheme in 1969, with Bruce Jr. taking Dick's costume so the legacy of Batman can live on, claiming that the Joker 'merely' killed Robin. In Superman/Batman: Generations 2, Dick's ghost begins haunting the Joker in 1975. With the help of Deadman, Doctor Occult, and the ghost of Alfred Pennyworth, Dick and Alfred go into the light, Alfred convincing Dick that tormenting the Joker can serve no purpose but to risk Dick's soul, now that the Joker is so close to dying of natural causes.

=== Smallville: Season 11 ===
In the comic book continuation of the television series Smallville, Dick is Barbara Gordon's boyfriend, who becomes her successor as Nightwing and Batman's replacement partner after she becomes a Blue Lantern. Unlike previous depictions, Dick was never Bruce Wayne's ward and protégé as Robin and has referred that he was a former circus acrobat-turned-police officer before becoming Batman's new partner, in the ranks of detectives within the Gotham City Police Department.

=== Nightwing: The New Order ===
In this alternate reality, Nightwing ends a conflict among superpowered beings by activating a device that depowers 90% of them, leading to a future where superpowers are outlawed. Though his identity is exposed, Dick Grayson is celebrated as a hero and becomes the leader of a government task force called The Crusaders, tasked with hunting down super-powered individuals. He raises his son, Jake, who inherits Starfire's powers, creating tension between them due to the oppressive system Dick helped establish. After teaming up with the Titans to help Jake escape, Dick ultimately decides to support the restoration of superpowers. He spends his later years teaching super-powered children, and Jake eventually honors his father by naming his own son Richard.

=== The Gift ===
In an alternate timeline where Booster Gold prevents the murder of Thomas and Martha Wayne, Gotham has become a war zone of criminals and the Joker has become a sort of terrorist with no one to stop him. Dick Grayson is the one and only Batman who uses lethal force.

=== DC vs Vampires ===
An elseworld in which multiple prominent heroes including Wonder Woman and Superman are turned into vampires. Dick Grayson is later revealed to be the king of the vampires and kills Batman, Red Robin, and Red Hood.

=== Absolute Universe ===
In the Absolute Universe, appearing in Absolute Batman, Dick Grayson is a paramedic who hates Batman, believing his vigilantism is destroying the city. It's later revealed that Dick is the adopted son of Jack Grimm V (Absolute Joker). He joins his adopted siblings as a part of the Robin Program, a paramilitary force created to hunt down Batman for the murder of James Gordon.

== Cultural impact ==
Since his first appearance, Robin (Dick Grayson) has constantly been referred to as one of the "greatest sidekicks of all time" and the "greatest superhero sidekick of all time" and since has ascended to the status of a global pop culture phenomenon, like his father/mentor. Writing for The Guardian, Julia Savoca Gibson describes Robin as a way for younger people to tap into superhero fantasy:

While young heroes such as Spider-Man also serve a younger audience, there is something special about sidekicks, and there's something even more special about Robin. To be part of an 80-year history, to be chosen and trained by the Batman, one of the most recognisable figures in pop culture, and become instantly recognisable in his own right … few characters come close to Robin's legacy. Few superheroes have so much potential to be more inclusive, too, since very few mantles are passed on as often.

He appeared on stamps alongside other DC characters in 2021.

== In other media ==
=== Television ===
==== Live-action ====
- Dick Grayson as Robin appears in Batman (1966), portrayed by Burt Ward.
- Dick Grayson as Robin and Nightwing appears in Titans, portrayed by Brenton Thwaites.
- The '60s incarnation of Dick Grayson makes a brief cameo appearance in the Arrowverse crossover "Crisis on Infinite Earths", portrayed again by Burt Ward.

==== Animation ====
- Dick Grayson as Robin appears in The Adventures of Batman, voiced by Casey Kasem.
- Dick Grayson as Robin appears in The New Scooby-Doo Movies, voiced again by Casey Kasem.
- Dick Grayson as Robin appears in the Super Friends franchise, voiced by Casey Kasem and Burt Ward.
- Dick Grayson as Robin and Nightwing appears in series set in the DC Animated Universe (DCAU), voiced by Loren Lester as an adult and Joey Simmrin as a child.
- Dick Grayson as Robin appears in Teen Titans, voiced by Scott Menville. A future version of him who became Nightwing appears in the episode "How Long Is Forever?".
- Dick Grayson as Robin appears in The Batman, voiced by Eve Sabara. (Note: Originally credited as Evan Sabara; Eve came out as a trans woman in 2020.) A future version of him who became Nightwing appears in the episode "Artifacts", voiced by Jerry O'Connell.
- Dick Grayson as Robin and Nightwing appears in Batman: The Brave and the Bold, voiced by Crawford Wilson as an adult and Jeremy Shada as a child. A imaginary version of him who became Batman appears in the episode "The Knights of Tomorrow!".
- Dick Grayson as Robin and Nightwing appears in Young Justice, voiced by Jesse McCartney.
- Dick Grayson as Robin appears in DC Super Friends (2015), voiced by Johnny Yong Bosch.
- Dick Grayson as Robin appears in Teen Titans Go!, voiced again by Scott Menville. A future version of him who became Nightwing appears in subsequent episodes.
- Dick Grayson as Robin appears in DC Super Hero Girls (2019), voiced by Keith Ferguson.
- Dick Grayson as Nightwing appears in Harley Quinn voiced by Harvey Guillén.
- Dick Grayson as Nightwing appears in Batwheels, voiced by Zachary Gordon.
- A young Dick Grayson appears in the Batman: Caped Crusader episode "Nocturne", voiced by Carter Rockwood.

=== Film ===
==== Live-action ====
- Dick Grayson as Robin appears in Batman (1943), portrayed by Douglas Croft.
- Dick Grayson as Robin appears in Batman and Robin (1949), portrayed by Johnny Duncan.
- Dick Grayson as Robin appears in early scripts for Batman (1989), but is absent from the final film. Michael J. Fox, Eddie Murphy, and Marlon Wayans were considered for the role.
- Dick Grayson as Robin appears in Batman Forever and Batman & Robin, portrayed by Chris O'Donnell. A spin-off starring Robin was planned, but scrapped after the failure of Batman & Robin.
- The '60s incarnation of Dick Grayson / Robin with Burt Ward's likeness makes a brief cameo appearance in The Flash.

==== Animation ====
- Dick Grayson as Robin appears in Justice League: The New Frontier, voiced by Shane Haboucha.
- Dick Grayson as Nightwing appears in Batman: Under the Red Hood, voiced by Neil Patrick Harris.
- Dick Grayson as Nightwing appears in films set in the DC Animated Movie Universe (DCAMU), voiced by Sean Maher. In Batman: Bad Blood he temporarily takes the mantle of Batman in Bruce's absence.
- Dick Grayson as Nightwing appears in Batman Unlimited: Mechs vs. Mutants, voiced by Will Friedle.
- Dick Grayson as Robin appears in Batman: Return of the Caped Crusaders and Batman vs. Two-Face, voiced again by Burt Ward.
- Dick Grayson as Robin appears in The Lego Batman Movie, voiced by Michael Cera.
- Dick Grayson as Nightwing appears in Batman and Harley Quinn, voiced again by Loren Lester.
- Dick Grayson as Nightwing appears in Batman Ninja, voiced by Adam Croasdell.
- The Teen Titans Go! incarnation of Dick Grayson / Robin appears in Teen Titans Go! To the Movies, voiced again by Scott Menville and Jacob Jeffries providing his singing voice for the song "My Superhero Movie".
- A young, alternate universe variant of Dick Grayson appears in Batman: Gotham by Gaslight, voiced by Lincoln Melcher.
- Dick Grayson as Nightwing appears in Lego DC Batman: Family Matters, voiced again by Will Friedle.
- The Teen Titans Go! and Teen Titans incarnations of Dick Grayson / Robin appear in Teen Titans Go! vs. Teen Titans, with both voiced by Scott Menville. The DCAMU variant of Dick as Nightwing also appears, with Sean Maher reprising the role.
- Dick Grayson as Nightwing appears in Injustice, voiced by Derek Phillips, and becomes Deadwing after being accidentally killed in a battle with Damian.
- The Teen Titans Go! incarnation of Dick Grayson / Robin appears in Teen Titans Go! & DC Super Hero Girls: Mayhem in the Multiverse, voiced again by Scott Menville.
- Dick Grayson appears in Batman: The Doom That Came to Gotham, voiced by Jason Marsden.
- Dick Grayson appears in Justice League: Crisis on Infinite Earths, voiced by Zach Callison. Additionally, the Earth-Two version of Dick Grayson / Robin appears also voiced by Callison.
- Dick Grayson as Nightwing appears in Batman Ninja vs. Yakuza League, voiced by Houston Hayes.
- Dick Grayson as Nightwing appears in Batman: Knightfall, voiced by Mike Prater.
- Dick Grayson will appear in the stop motion animated DC Studios film Dynamic Duo, set to be released on June 30, 2028. The film is directed by Arthur Mintz and written by Matthew Aldrich and the writing team of Scott Neustadter and Michael H. Weber.

=== Video games ===
- Dick Grayson as Nightwing appears as a playable character in Batman: Rise of Sin Tzu, voiced again by Loren Lester.
- Dick Grayson as Nightwing appears in DC Universe Online, voiced by Joey Hood and Wil Wheaton respectively.
- Dick Grayson as Robin and Nightwing appears as a playable character in Lego Batman: The Videogame, voiced by James Arnold Taylor.
- Dick Grayson as Nightwing appears in Young Justice: Legacy, voiced again by Jesse McCartney and Cameron Bowen.
- Dick Grayson as Robin and Nightwing appears in the Batman: Arkham series, voiced by Quinton Flynn in Batman: Arkham City, Josh Keaton in Batman: Arkham Origins (Multiplayer Mode only) and Batman: Arkham Shadow, and by Scott Porter in Batman: Arkham Knight.
- Dick Grayson as Nightwing appears as a playable character in Lego Batman 2: DC Super Heroes, voiced by Cam Clarke.
- Dick Grayson as Robin and Nightwing appears in the Injustice series, voiced by Troy Baker in Injustice: Gods Among Us.
- Dick Grayson as Nightwing appears as an NPC in Scribblenauts Unmasked: A DC Comics Adventure.
- Dick Grayson as Robin and Nightwing appears as a playable character in Lego Batman 3: Beyond Gotham, voiced by Josh Keaton.
- Dick Grayson as Nightwing appears as a playable character in Infinite Crisis.
- Dick Grayson as Nightwing appears in DC Battle Arena, voiced by P. M. Seymour.
- Dick Grayson as Nightwing appears as a playable character in Gotham Knights, voiced by Christopher Sean.
- Dick Grayson as Robin and Nightwing appears as a playable character in Lego Batman: Legacy of the Dark Knight, voiced by Hyoie O'Grady as an adult and Greg Jones as a child.

== See also ==
- List of Batman supporting characters
- List of DC Comics characters
- Robin
- Nightwing
- Red X
