= Torque (DC Comics) =

DC Comics supervillain

- Torque as depicted in Nightwing Secret Files and Origins #1 (October 1999). Art by Jackson Guice (penciller) and Tom McCraw (colorist).

Publication information
- Publisher: DC Comics
- First appearance: As Soames: Nightwing (vol. 2) #1 (October 1996); As Torque: Nightwing (vol. 2) #27 (January 1999)
- Created by: Chuck Dixon (writer); Scott McDaniel (artist)

In-story information
- Alter ego: Dudley Soames
- Team affiliations: Blüdhaven Police Department; Intergang
- Partnerships: Nite-Wing
- Abilities: Expert marksman with the Thompson .45 machine gun; Wears specialized glasses with rear-view mirrors

Torque (Dudley Soames) is a supervillain appearing in American comic books published by DC Comics, and an enemy of Nightwing. Created by writer Chuck Dixon and artist Scott McDaniel, he first appeared in Nightwing (vol. 2) #1 (October 1996).

== Fictional character biography ==
Dudley Soames is a police inspector working in the Blüdhaven Police Department, which is rife with corruption. He first encounters Nightwing when police chief Delmore Redhorn hires him to kill Nightwing. Soames betrays Redhorn and allowed Nightwing to live, with the intention to pit various factions in Blüdhaven against one another. He plays both sides of the legal fence: he feeds information on Blockbuster's criminal dealings to Nightwing and serves Blockbuster as a mob lieutenant.

After Soames' scheme to use Scarecrow against Nightwing fails disastrously, Blockbuster grows weary of him and attempts to have him killed. Blockbuster twists Soames' head 180 degrees, leaving him for dead.

Soames survives due to his trachea remaining unharmed for a sufficient duration, allowing him to be placed on life support. His neck is surgically repaired, which restores his mobility, but leaves his head permanently inverted. Soames spends some time retraining himself to move normally, seeing behind him using glasses with a built-in array of mirrors. Soames kills the doctor who saved his life, takes the moniker "Torque", and starts a gang war for the control of Blüdhaven, seeking to get revenge against Blockbuster.

Torque is brought to justice by Nightwing, only to arrange a prison break with the help of the psychopathic vigilante Nite-Wing, who seeks to settle his own vendetta against Nightwing. Nite-Wing has a zero-tolerance policy for crime; upon realizing Soames' true nature, the two enter a Mexican standoff that only Nite-Wing survives.

== In other media ==
- Torque appears in the Arrow episode "Unthinkable", portrayed by Michael Adamthwaite. This version is a member of the Suicide Squad.
- Torque appears as a character summon in Scribblenauts Unmasked: A DC Comics Adventure.

== See also ==
- List of Batman family enemies
