= Tarantula (DC Comics) =

Two comic book characters owned by DC Comics

- John Law as the Tarantula as he appeared on the cover of All-Star Squadron #66 (February 1987). Art by Tony DeZuniga and Arvell Jones.

Publication information
- Publisher: DC Comics
- First appearance: (Law); Star-Spangled Comics #1 (October 1941) (Flores); Nightwing (vol. 2) #71 (September 2002)
- Created by: (Law); Mort Weisinger, Hal Sharp (Flores); Devin Grayson

In-story information
- Alter ego: Jonathan "John" Law; Catalina Marie Flores
- Team affiliations: (Law); All-Star Squadron
- Abilities: (Law); Good acrobat Trained hand-to-hand combatant Uses several gimmicks, such as suction cups and a "web-gun"

The Tarantula is the name of two characters appearing in American comic books published by DC Comics. The first, John Law, is a superhero introduced during the Golden Age of Comic Books, while the second is a villain introduced in the 2000s. Both are associated with the character Nightwing.

== Publication history ==
The original Tarantula was a character prominent in the 1940s named John Law. He first appeared in Star-Spangled Comics #1 (October 1941) and was created by Mort Weisinger and designed and drawn by cartoonist Hal Sharp. He continued in Star Spangled Comics until issue #19 (April 1943). In his initial Golden Age appearances he wore a yellow-and-purple costume that bore strong resemblance to Wesley Dodds' second Sandman costume. This was later explained in a retcon in the pages of All-Star Squadron as coming from Dodds' associate, Dian Belmont. He was assisted by his housekeeper Olga. According to Jess Nevins' Encyclopedia of Golden Age Superheroes, the Tarantula battles "the sword-wielding Blade, the cowboy thief the Outlaw and his pyrotechnic partner the Candle, the Hindu-themed Shiva, and the crime lord Sting".

The second Tarantula, Catalina Flores, first appeared in Nightwing (vol. 2) #71 (September 2002), and debuted as Tarantula in issue #75 (January 2003). She was created by Devin Grayson.

At the end of Nightwing (vol. 2) #93 (July 2004), after Tarantula killed Blockbuster, she raped Nightwing on the rooftop. At the time, Nightwing was in shock and undergoing deep emotional trauma. He had also explicitly told Catalina not to touch him, but she proceeded despite this. On the subject, writer Devin Grayson made the following statement: "For the record, I've never used the word 'rape', I just said it was non-consensual". In a 2014 interview, Grayson apologized for the comment, explicitly referring to the act as rape.

== Fictional character biography ==
=== John Law ===
Mystery story writer John Law was inspired to become a mystery man by the Crimson Avenger shortly after the United States entered World War II. As Tarantula, Law uses suction cups attached to the soles on his boots to allow him to walk up walls and hang from ceilings. He also uses a "web-gun" which fires a string of fast-hardening nylon to swing from one anchored point to another.

Law was a member of the All-Star Squadron before retiring to continue his writing career. In his later years, Law lived in the city of Blüdhaven, in the same building as Dick Grayson, also known as Nightwing. The building is burned down by the villain Blockbuster in an attempt to ruin Nightwing's life, killing Law and 21 other residents.

=== Catalina Flores ===
Cover to Nightwing (vol. 2) #87 (January 2004), art by Patrick Zircher.

Catalina Marie Flores grew up in Blüdhaven and joined the FBI after witnessing the crimes plaguing the city. She eventually returns to Blüdhaven, where she becomes a vigilante. Nightwing is unimpressed with her extreme vigilante methods and forbade her to operate in Blüdhaven. Nightwing later investigates the death of Delmore Redhorn, Blüdhaven's corrupt chief of police, and discovers Tarantula to be the killer.

Working with Tad Ryerstad (Nite-Wing), Nightwing has Tarantula arrested for the murder of Redhorn, although Ryerstad - also a wanted vigilante - is arrested as well. After being released from prison, Tarantula aids Blockbuster in his revenge campaign on Nightwing. When ordered to kill Grayson's girlfriend, Barbara Gordon, she instead manipulates a dinner engagement between the two in such a manner that caused Gordon to break up with Grayson.

Following John Law's death, Tarantula helps Nightwing record Blockbuster's confession, but when she gives the tape to her brother, he crushes it because of a deal he made with Blockbuster to get her out of prison. During a later battle between Nightwing and Blockbuster, Tarantula involves herself and shoots Blockbuster. Afterwards, Grayson is wounded and suffering a near-mental breakdown due to Blockbuster's revenge campaign and Tarantula rapes him. After the events of War Games, Nightwing comes to his senses and turns in Tarantula and himself for Blockbuster's death. He is acquitted of his crimes, however, while Tarantula is imprisoned.

Tarantula steals a mysterious card from Junior, a mysterious crime boss who runs all of the West Coast mobs. It was later revealed that she was in possession of a "Get Out of Hell Free" card, forged by Neron. The card is coveted by Junior, who sends an army of supervillains after Tarantula. Tarantula sacrifices herself by pulling Junior and herself in front of a combined attack from the assembled villains, killing them both.

Tarantula was reintroduced following The New 52 continuity reboot.

== In other media ==
The Catalina Flores incarnation of Tarantula makes a non-speaking cameo appearance in The Lego Batman Movie as one of several villains recruited by the Joker.
