= Blockbuster (DC Comics) =

Blockbuster is the name of four supervillains and a criminal organization appearing in American comic books published by DC Comics. The first iteration was an adversary of Batman and Robin, while the second served as one of Nightwing's greatest enemies. The third debuted in 52 as a member of Lex Luthor's Infinity, Inc.

Blockbuster has appeared in various media outside comics, including television series and films. Kevin Michael Richardson, Dee Bradley Baker, René Auberjonois, and Dave Fennoy have voiced the character in animation.

== Publication history ==
The Mark Desmond incarnation of Blockbuster first appeared in Detective Comics #345 (November 1965), and was created by Gardner Fox and Carmine Infantino.

The Roland Desmond incarnation of Blockbuster first appeared in Starman #9 (April 1989), and was created by Roger Stern and Tom Lyle.

== Fictional character biography ==
=== Mark Desmond ===
Blockbuster
- The Mark Desmond incarnation of Blockbuster as depicted in Batman #309 (March 1979). Art by John Calnan.

Publication information
- Publisher: DC Comics
- First appearance: Detective Comics #345 (November 1965)
- Created by: Gardner Fox (writer); Carmine Infantino (artist)

In-story information
- Alter ego: Mark Desmond
- Species: Metahuman
- Team affiliations: Secret Society of Super Villains; Suicide Squad
- Abilities: Superhuman strength, stamina, and durability

The first Blockbuster is Mark Desmond, a chemist who desires to increase his physical strength. Experimenting on himself, he succeeds in making himself stronger and taller, but as a side-effect of the process he becomes almost mindlessly aggressive. The mentally debilitated Desmond is cared for by his brother Roland, a local criminal, who keeps their mother from discovering what Mark had done to himself.

Roland manipulates his brother into committing crimes on his behalf until they came into conflict with Batman and Robin. Bruce Wayne had once rescued a young Desmond from drowning, and he discovered that he could calm Desmond by removing his cowl and showing his face. Desmond later clashes with Batman on various occasions.

Blockbuster absorbs energies from the Alfred Memorial which gave him some powers and was once substituted for the super-strong undead villain Solomon Grundy from Earth-Two due to a machine that was substituting people from both Earths. Green Lantern causes him to fight Grundy, leading to them both briefly knocking each other out. Grundy is taken back to Earth-Two by the Justice Society of America, while Blockbuster is handed over to the police by the Justice League.

Blockbuster briefly joins the Secret Society of Super Villains for a battle with the Justice League.

Later, Amanda Waller recruited Desmond for her revived Suicide Squad. He was killed fighting Darkseid's creation Brimstone.

In 2011, The New 52 rebooted the continuity of the DC universe. Mark Desmond is reintroduced as a patient of Dr. Phayne who undergoes procedures to enhance his intelligence, where he is gradually given a green compound via intravenous therapy. Another patient, believing himself to be in pain, causes an accident that causes Desmond to overdose on the compound and transform into Blockbuster.

=== Roland Desmond ===
Blockbuster
- The Roland Desmond incarnation of Blockbuster as depicted in Underworld Unleashed: Patterns of Fear #1 (November 1995). Art by Rick Burchett.

Publication information
- Publisher: DC Comics
- First appearance: Starman #9 (April 1989)
- Created by: Roger Stern (writer); Tom Lyle (artist)

In-story information
- Alter ego: Roland Desmond
- Species: Metahuman
- Team affiliations: Blockbuster's Gang; Underground Society; Black Lantern Corps
- Abilities: Superhuman strength, stamina, and durability; Genius-level intellect

Roland Desmond becomes the second Blockbuster after a severe illness forces him to be treated with experimental steroids. Like his brother Mark, Roland becomes a child-minded super-strong monster. He rampages in the Southwest before being stopped by Batman and Starman (Will Payton).

Desmond becomes obsessed with elevating himself greatly above his debilitated brain. A pact with the demon Neron restores his intelligence at the cost of his soul. Desmond embarks once more on a career of crime and destruction, even after his soul is restored. He begins his revived criminal career by causing chaos in Manchester, Alabama, although his schemes are foiled by Impulse.

Desmond moves to his mother's hometown of Blüdhaven, where he forces crime lord Angel Marin out of power and takes over the city's criminal rackets. Desmond plans to build a criminal empire in Blüdhaven that would eventually enable him to extend his dominion over Gotham, Star City, Metropolis, and New York's underworlds. For that purpose, he hires corrupt members of the city's police department, including Police Chief Redhorn and Inspector Dudley Soames.

Despite his swift and vicious consolidation of power, Blockbuster's hold on Blüdhaven's organized crime is weakened by the intervention of the city's new protector, Nightwing (Dick Grayson, the former Robin), who, with Oracle's help, foils Desmond's plans at every turn. Oracle often removes money from Blockbuster's accounts and he has a man working to stop and find Oracle, named Vogel.

As a further result of his initial transformation, Desmond develops albinism and a heart defect. He was restored to (comparative) health by a heart transplant from one of the talking apes of Gorilla City, and is in the process of consolidating his control over Blüdhaven when he is killed by Tarantula.

In the Blackest Night event, Roland's corpse is reanimated by a black power ring and recruited to the Black Lantern Corps.

Blockbuster is resurrected following The New 52 reboot and the DC Rebirth relaunch, which rebooted the continuity of the DC universe. Nightwing battles Blockbuster, who learns his secret identity of Dick Grayson. When Nightwing defeats Blockbuster, the people of Blüdhaven stand up to him. Blockbuster's gang desert him after Batgirl reveals that Blockbuster owns Blüdhaven Private Prisons, where they had all served time. Blockbuster flees into an alley, where he is killed by the villain Heartless.

=== Third Blockbuster ===
In the series 52, Lex Luthor creates a new Blockbuster to serve as an opponent of his manufactured hero team Infinity, Inc. Little is revealed about this Blockbuster, save for the fact that Luthor possesses some measure of control over his actions and level of strength. Luthor also comments that he is stronger than either of the previous two Blockbusters.

Blockbuster appears among the villains exiled to an alien world in Salvation Run. In issue #3, Blockbuster is revealed to be Martian Manhunter who disguised himself to observe the exiled villains on Batman's behalf.

=== Female Blockbuster ===
A newer, female Blockbuster of indeterminate origins appears in the swamps of Louisiana and fights Mon-El and King Billy.

== Powers and abilities ==
All incarnations of Blockbuster possess superhuman physical abilities coupled with reduced intelligence. Roland Desmond overcame this weakness after receiving enhanced power from Neron, gaining genius-level intellect.

== Other versions ==
An alternate universe version of Blockbuster appears in Just Imagine.... This version is Brock Smith, a murderer and death row inmate who is rescued and empowered by Dominic Darrk and joins the Doom Patrol. He is defeated by Batman and Wonder Woman and dies after being electrocuted.

== In other media ==
=== Television ===
Blockbuster as he appears in Young Justice.

- The Mark Desmond incarnation of Blockbuster appears in Justice League Unlimited, voiced by Dee Bradley Baker. This version is a member of Gorilla Grodd's Secret Society before being killed by Darkseid.
- Mark Desmond appears in The Batman episode "Meltdown", voiced by Kevin Michael Richardson. This version is an African-American scientist working for Wayne Enterprises.
- The Mark Desmond incarnation of Blockbuster appears in Batman: The Brave and the Bold, voiced by James Arnold Taylor and Kevin Michael Richardson respectively. This version is a young prodigy who stole chemicals from S.T.A.R. Labs to create a strength-enhancing serum.
- The Mark Desmond incarnation of Blockbuster appears in Young Justice, with Mark Desmond voiced initially by René Auberjonois and later by Dee Bradley Baker following Auberjonois' death while sound effects were used for Blockbuster. This version is a senior member of Project Cadmus and the Light. Additionally, he was redesigned due to his perceived similarity to Marvel Comics character the Hulk, with Desmond's transformation having his Blockbuster form ripping through his human skin.
- Mark Desmond appears in The Flash episode "Funeral for a Friend", portrayed by an uncredited actor. This version is a criminal who wields an exo-suit stolen from Ivo Laboratories.
- Mark Desmond appears in Batman: Caped Crusader, voiced by Zach Lazar Hoffman. This version's powers are derived from a toxin created by Hugo Strange.

=== Film ===
- Blockbuster was reportedly featured in David S. Goyer's unproduced screenplay for a Green Arrow film project entitled Escape from Super Max as an inmate of the eponymous prison.
- An alternate universe version of Blockbuster appears in Justice League: Gods and Monsters, voiced by Marcelo Tubert. He and a group of terrorists fight their universe's Justice League before Batman kills him.
- The Roland Desmond incarnation of Blockbuster makes a minor appearance in Batman: Bad Blood.
- The Mark Desmond incarnation of Blockbuster appears in Scooby-Doo! & Batman: The Brave and the Bold, voiced by Fred Tatasciore.
- The Roland Desmond incarnation of Blockbuster appears in Suicide Squad: Hell to Pay, voiced by Dave Fennoy. This version is a henchman of Professor Zoom before being killed by Killer Frost.

=== Video games ===
- The Mark Desmond incarnation of Blockbuster appears as a boss in Young Justice: Legacy, voiced by Mark Rolston.
- The Roland Desmond incarnation of Blockbuster appears in Batman: The Telltale Series, voiced by Steve Blum. This version has blue skin and is a member of the Children of Arkham.

=== Miscellaneous ===
- The Roland Desmond incarnation of Blockbuster appears in Adventures in the DC Universe #1.
- The Mark Desmond incarnation of Blockbuster appears in Batman: Arkham Knight – Genesis #5 as an associate of the Joker, Harley Quinn, and Catman until Jason Todd kills him.

== See also ==
- List of Batman family enemies
