= Green Arrow in other media =

Adaptations of Green Arrow in other media
- Original source: Comics published by DC Comics
- First appearance: More Fun Comics #73 (November 1941)

Films and television
- Television show(s): Super Friends (1973); Justice League Unlimited (2004); Smallville (2006); The Batman (2007); Batman: The Brave and the Bold (2008); Young Justice (2010); Arrow (2012); The Flash (2014); Legends of Tomorrow (2016)

Green Arrow, a DC Comics superhero, has appeared in media other than comic books since 1973, including animated shows, live-action productions, and video games.

== Television ==
=== Animation ===
- In the 1960s, studio Filmation considered making a Green Arrow animated series following the success of The Superman/Aquaman Hour of Adventure, but the plans were cancelled when CBS secured the animation rights to Batman in the wake of ABC's recent success with Batman (1966).
- Green Arrow appears in the Super Friends episode "Gulliver's Gigantic Goof", voiced by Norman Alden. This version is a member of the Justice League.
- Green Arrow appears in Justice League Unlimited, voiced by Kin Shriner. This version is a member of the Justice League. Throughout the series he develops a close friendship with Supergirl and later forms a relationship with Black Canary.
- Green Arrow appears in The Batman, voiced by Chris Hardwick. This version is a member of the Justice League.
- Green Arrow appears in Batman: The Brave and the Bold, voiced by James Arnold Taylor. This version is a friendly rival but also a close friend of Batman.
- Green Arrow appears in Young Justice, voiced by Alan Tudyk. This version is a member of the Justice League.
- Green Arrow appears in the Mad segment "That's What Super Friends Are For".
- Green Arrow appears in a self-titled segment of DC Nation Shorts, voiced by Will Friedle.
- The Arrowverse incarnation of Green Arrow appears in Vixen, voiced by Stephen Amell.
- Green Arrow appears in Justice League Action, voiced again by Chris Diamantopoulos. This version is a member of the Justice League.
- The Arrowverse incarnation of Green Arrow appears in Freedom Fighters: The Ray, voiced by Matthew Mercer.
- Green Arrow appears in DC Super Hero Girls, voiced by Eddie Perino. This version is the onstage nemesis of Zatanna and a member of the Invincibros.
- Green Arrow appears in Batwheels, voiced by MacLeod Andrews.

=== Live-action ===
- In February 1994, CBS was developing a Green Arrow pilot from Warner Bros. Television and producer Norman Stephens.
- Oliver Queen / Green Arrow appears in Smallville, portrayed by Justin Hartley. This version is a founding member of the Justice League. Throughout the series, he enters a relationship with Chloe Sullivan and publicly reveals his secret identity. In the comic continuation, Smallville Season 11, Oliver and Chloe have a son named Jonathan. Additionally, Green Arrow was considered to appear in a spin-off solo series, which went unproduced.
- Oliver Queen / Green Arrow appears in media set in the Arrowverse, portrayed by Stephen Amell. Introduced in a self-titled series, Green Arrow makes subsequent appearances in The Flash, Legends of Tomorrow, and Supergirl. Additionally, an alternate universe version of Robert Queen who became Green Arrow is mentioned in the second season of The Flash while Mia Queen becomes Green Arrow in the crossover "Crisis on Infinite Earths".
  - An Arrow spin-off series starring Mia Queen, Laurel Lance, and Dinah Drake titled Green Arrow and the Canaries aired as a backdoor pilot in the show’s final season, but ultimately did not move forward.
- Green Arrow appears in a photograph depicted in the Stargirl episode "Brainwave". This version is a member of the Seven Soldiers of Victory.

== Film ==
=== Animation ===
- Green Arrow appears in Justice League: The New Frontier.
- Green Arrow appears in DC Showcase: Green Arrow, voiced by Neal McDonough.
- Oliver Queen appears in Batman: The Dark Knight Returns, voiced by Robin Atkin Downes.
- Green Arrow appears in Lego DC Comics Super Heroes: Justice League vs. Bizarro League, voiced by Phil Morris.
- Green Arrow appears in the Batman Unlimited series of films, voiced by Chris Diamantopoulos.
- Green Arrow makes a non-speaking cameo appearance in The Lego Batman Movie.
- Green Arrow makes a non-speaking cameo appearance in Teen Titans Go! To the Movies.
- Green Arrow appears in films set in the Tomorrowverse, voiced by Jimmi Simpson.
- Green Arrow appears in Injustice, voiced by Reid Scott.
- Green Arrow appears in Batman and Superman: Battle of the Super Sons, voiced by Tom Kenny.
- An alternate universe version of Oliver Queen appears in Batman: The Doom That Came to Gotham, voiced by Christopher Gorham. This version is a hunter who wields holy weaponry and is later killed by Poison Ivy.

=== Live-action ===
- David S. Goyer and Justin Marks penned a script for a film starring Green Arrow titled Green Arrow: Escape from Super Max, which went unproduced.
- Stephen Amell, who portrays the character on Arrow, said in 2013 that he was interested in portraying the character in the DC Extended Universe film Justice League (2017). Warner Bros., however, has denied continuity between the DCEU and the Arrowverse.

== Video games ==
- Green Arrow appears as a playable character in Justice League Task Force.
- Green Arrow appears as a playable character in Justice League Heroes, voiced by Ralph Garman.
- Green Arrow appears as a playable character in Batman: The Brave and the Bold – The Videogame, voiced again by James Arnold Taylor.
- Green Arrow appears as a playable character in DC Universe Online, voiced by David Jennison.
- Green Arrow appears in Lego Batman 2: DC Super Heroes.
- Green Arrow appears as a playable character in Injustice: Gods Among Us and Injustice 2, voiced again by Alan Tudyk. Additionally, the Arrowverse incarnation appears as an alternate skin in the former, voiced by Stephen Amell.
- Green Arrow appears in Infinite Crisis, voiced again by Alan Tudyk.
- Green Arrow appears as a playable character in Lego Batman 3: Beyond Gotham, voiced again by Stephen Amell.
- Green Arrow appears as a playable character in Lego Dimensions, voiced again by Chris Hardwick.
- Green Arrow appears as a playable character in DC Legends.
- The comic book and Arrowverse incarnations of Green Arrow appear as playable characters in Lego DC Super-Villains.
- The Arrowverse incarnation of Green Arrow appears as a skin in Fortnite Battle Royale.
