= Devin Grayson =

American writer

- Born: New Haven, Connecticut, U.S.
- Education: Bard College (BA)
- Occupation: Writer
- Years active: 1996–present
- Notable work: Catwoman; Nightwing/Huntress; Batman: Gotham Knights; Titans; Nightwing; User
- Website: devingrayson.net

Devin Kalile Grayson is an American comic book writer and novelist.

== Early life ==
Grayson was born in New Haven, Connecticut. She was raised in northern California, where she lived with her mother in Berkeley and her father in Oakland. She legally changed her name to Devin Kalile Grayson in her twenties due to childhood sexual abuse.

Her early ambition was to be an actress. She transferred from Berkeley High School to the San Francisco School of the Arts, studying additionally with the American Conservatory Theater, Cazadero Performing Arts Camp, Berkeley Shakespeare Festival, and the Shelton Studios.

While attending community college she decided to become a writer and transferred to Bard College, where she studied fiction writing under Mona Simpson. After graduating she moved to San Francisco, where she worked at a health maintenance organization and attended graduate writing classes at the University of California, Berkeley. In her free time she also wrote fanfiction.

She became interested in comics after watching Batman: The Animated Series.

== Career ==
Grayson's first comic book script to see print was "Like Riding a Bike", a 10-page short that appeared in the Batman Chronicles in 1997. Other work for DC Comics and Marvel Comics soon followed.

== Personal life ==
Grayson is openly bisexual. She was diagnosed with type I diabetes at the age of fifteen and has an assistance dog. She lives in northern California with her husband and her stepson. She was formerly in a relationship with fellow comic book writer Mark Waid.

== Awards and nominations ==
- 1999:
  - Kimberly Yale Award for Best New Talent (Friends of Lulu)
  - (nominated) Comics Buyer's Guide Fan Awards for Favorite Writer
- 2000 (nominated) Comics Buyer's Guide Fan Awards for Favorite Writer
- 2001 (nominated) GLAAD Media Award for Outstanding Comic Book (for User)

== Bibliography ==
=== Ahoy Comics ===
- Edgar Allan Poe's Snifter of Blood #2 - writer of 'A Tipple of Amontillado' feature (2020)

=== Dark Horse Comics ===
- Rewild Graphic Novel (2022)

=== DC Comics ===
- Batman Plus Arsenal #1 (1997)
- Batman Secret Files and Origins #1 (1997)
- The Batman Chronicles #7, 9, 12, 18, 20 (1997, 1997, 1998, 1999, 2000)
- Arsenal #1–4 (1998)
- Catwoman #54–71, 1000000, Annual #4 (1998–1999)
- Batman Annual #22 (1998)
- Superman Adventures #18 (1998)
- Nightwing/Huntress #1–4 (1998)
- Batman 80 Page Giant #1 (1998)
- Batman Villains: Secret Files & Origins #1 (1998)
- JLA/Titans #1–#3 (1998–1999)
- DCU Holiday Bash II, III (1998, 1999)
- The Titans Secret Files #1 (1999)
- The Titans #1–20 (#14 co-written with Brian K. Vaughan; #13, 17–20 co-written with Jay Faerber) (1999–2000)
- Detective Comics #731, 741 (1999, 2000)
- Batman #564 (1999)
- Batman: Legends of the Dark Knight #116, 126, 177–178 (1999, 2000, 2004)
- Shadow of the Bat #84, 92, 94 (1999, 1999, 2000)
- JLA #32 (co-written with Mark Waid) (1999)
- Nightwing Secret Files #1 (1999)
- Relative Heroes #1–6 (2000)
- Batman: Gotham City Secret Files #1 (2000)
- Batman: Gotham Knights #1–11, 14–18, 20–32 (2000–2002)
- Nightwing #53, 71–100, 107–117, Annual #1 (2001, 2002–2006)
- Batman/Joker: Switch (2003)
- Year One: Batman/Ra's Al Ghul #1–2 (2005)
- Robin 80th Anniversary #1 - writer of Nightwing & The Titans feature (2020)
- Green Arrow 80th Anniversary #1 - writer of Arsenal feature (2021)
- Strange Love Adventures #1 - writer of Alfred feature (2022)
- DC Pride 2022 - writer of Jon Kent feature (2022)

=== DC Comics/Vertigo ===
- Flinch #7 - writer of Parade feature (1999)
- User #1–3 (2001)

=== DC Comics/Wildstorm ===
- Everquest: Transformation (2002)
- Matador #1–6 (2005–2006)

=== Dynamite Comics ===
- Legends of Red Sonja #1 - writer of La Sonja Rossa feature (2013)
- Vampirella; Feary Tales #1 - writer of Bluebeard's Blood feature (2014)

=== IDW ===
- Womanthology: Heroic - writer of Mook & Me feature (2012)
- Womanthology: Space #4 - writer of The Smell of Sunshine (2013)
- Teenage Mutant Ninja Turtles: Dimension X #5 (2017)
- Star Wars Forces of Destiny: Hera #1 (2018)
- Ghostbusters: 35th Anniversary: Answer the Call #1 (2019)
- GLOW Summer Special #1 (2019)

=== Marvel Comics ===
- Black Widow #1–3 (1999)
- Black Widow: Break Down #1–3 (co-written with Greg Rucka, 2001)
- Ghost Rider: The Hammer Lane #1–6 (Marvel Knight Imprint, 2001)
- X-Men: Evolution #1–8 (2001–2002)
- Girl Comics #1 - writer of X-Men feature (2010)
- Power Pack #63 (2017)
- Marvel Rising #0, Alpha #1, Omega #1 (2018)
- Ms. Marvel #38 - writer of Zoe feature (2019)
- War of the Realms: War Scrolls #2 - writer of Doctor Strange feature (2019)
- Widowmakers: Red Guardian and Yelena Belova #1 (2020)

=== Novels ===
- Batman: Rise of Sin Tzu (Published by Aspect, 2003)
- Smallville: City (Published by Aspect, 2004)
- DC Universe: Inheritance (Published by Warner Books, 2006)
- Doctor Strange: The Fate of Dreams (Published by Marvel Comics, 2016)
