= Scott McDaniel =

American comics artist (born 1965)

- Born: 1965 (age 60–61) Pittsburgh, Pennsylvania
- Areas: Penciller, Inker
- Notable works: Batman; Daredevil; Nightwing; Green Arrow

Scott McDaniel (born 1965) is an American comics artist whose comic book work includes Marvel Comics' "Fall from Grace" storyline for the Daredevil series. Artwork for DC Comics includes a run on Batman as regular penciller, Nightwing, Richard Dragon, and most recently Green Arrow.

== Biography ==
=== Early life and career ===
McDaniel was born in 1965 in the city of Pittsburgh, Pennsylvania. He was a fan of superheroes, and his mother would buy him stacks of comics from flea markets. He learned to draw from all those old comics.

McDaniel graduated from the Penn Hills Senior High School in Penn Hills, Pennsylvania. After graduation Scott wanted to be a surgeon, and attended Bucknell University in Lewisburg, Pennsylvania, where his father's heart surgeon studied. He was enrolled as a Pre-Med student until the day he walked into Inorganic Chemistry and saw a 4-foot-long Schrödinger Wave equation scrawled on the chalk board. At that moment he knew Pre-Med was not for him.

Next he became a chemistry major, and then a chemical engineering major. In freshman year at Bucknell he met Glenn Herdling, a friendship that would last for quite some time.

After graduating from Bucknell, Glenn took his double major (English and Psychology) and went on to work with Marvel Comics. Scott took his BS in electrical engineering and went to work with the Kearfott Division of the Singer Company.

Cover to Nightwing #100 (2004). Art by Scott McDaniel.

He married his high school girlfriend and had a son, who he named Alex.

He worked as an electrical engineer during the day, and worked on his art in the evenings. His friend Glenn would take his art into Marvel to get critiques by other editors and artists.

After several years of that critiquing, McDaniel began to get small penciling jobs from Marvel.

McDaniel relocated to Pittsburgh (in the suburb Monroeville), and continued working as an electrical engineer with the Loftus Division of the Eichleay Corporation. About a year later, McDaniel was getting more assignments from Marvel. When the call came with an opportunity to work on Daredevil, he quit his engineering job and began his career as a comic book artist.

=== Art style ===
McDaniel's work tends to feature bold, bright colors against stark black, with a greater than average attention to fight scenes.

== Bibliography ==
=== DC Comics ===
- 52 #42 ("Origin of Green Arrow" backup story, 2007)
- Batman #575–586, 588–602, 604–607 (2000–2002)
- Batman and Robin #17–19 (2011)
- Batman Confidential #22–25, 29–30 (2008–2009)
- The Batman Chronicles #5 (1996)
- Birds of Prey #125 (2009)
- Birds of Prey vol. 3 #21–34 (breakdowns, 2013–2014)
- Birds of Prey: Futures End #1 (breakdowns, 2014)
- Blue Beetle vol. 8 #15 (2013)
- Catwoman vol. 4 #22–23 (breakdowns, 2013)
- Countdown #29 ("Origin of Penguin" backup story, 2009)*
- Countdown: Arena #1–4 (2008)
- DC Comics Presents: Green Lantern #1 (2004)
- DC Universe Presents #0 (among other artists, 2012)
- Detective Comics #766, 867–870 (2002, 2010)
- Earth 2: World's End #9–25 (breakdowns, 2015)
- The Flash vol. 5 #37 (2018)
- The Great Ten #1–9 (2010)
- Green Arrow vol. 6 #60–75 (2006–2007)
- Green Lantern vol. 5 #36–37 (breakdowns, 2014)
- Green Lantern Corps: Edge of Oblivion #5–6 (breakdowns, 2016)
- JLA Classified #17–18 (2006)
- Just Imagine Stan Lee with Scott McDaniel Creating Aquaman #1 (2002)
- Nightwing vol. 2 #1–40, 101–106, #1,000,000, #1/2 (1996–2005)
- Nightwing: Target #1 (2001)
- Outsiders vol. 3 Annual #1 (2007)
- Richard Dragon #1–12 (2004–2005)
- Robin vol. 2 #139–147 (2005–2006)
- Robin 80th Anniversary 100-Page Super Spectacular #1 (among other artists, 2020)
- Robin: Son of Batman #7 (2016)
- Static Shock #1–8 (2011–2012)
- Strange Adventures vol. 3 #6–8 (2009)
- Superman vol. 2 #190–200 (2003–2004)
- Superman: The Ten Cent Adventure #1 (2003)
- Trinity #1, 4, 6, 8–10, 15, 17–18, 21–22, 24, 26–27, 31, 33, 36–37, 40, 42, 45–46, 48, 50, 52 (among other artists, 2008–2009)

=== Marvel Comics ===
- The Amazing Spider-Man Annual #26 (1992)
- Daredevil #305–315, 317–327, 329–332, 334, 336, Annual #9 (1992–1995)
- Elektra: Root of Evil #1–4 (1995)
- Green Goblin #1–4, 6–7, 9–10 (1995–1996)
- The Lethal Foes of Spider-Man #1–2 (1993)
- The Spectacular Spider-Man Annual #9, 12 (1989–1992)
- Spider-Man #19–20 (backup stories, 1992)
- Spider-Man/Punisher/Sabretooth: Designer Genes #1 (1993)
- Web of Spider-Man Annual #8 (1992)
- What If? vol. 2 #31 (1991)

=== Marvel Comics/DC Comics ===
- Assassins #1 (1996)
- Daredevil/Batman #1 (1997)

Preceded by none	Nightwing artist 1996–2000	Succeeded by Greg Land
Preceded by Jim Aparo	Batman artist 2000–2002	Succeeded by Jim Lee
Preceded by Damion Scott	Robin artist 2005–2006	Succeeded by Freddie Williams II
Preceded by Phil Hester	Green Arrow artist 2006–2007	Succeeded by Cliff Chiang
