= Red Volcano =

- Red Volcano and Professor Ivo as depicted in DC Universe #0 (April 2008). Art by Aaron Lopresti.

Publication information
- Publisher: DC Comics
- First appearance: DC Universe #0 (April 2008)
- Created by: Greg Weisman (concept); Kevin VanHook (writer); Grant Morrison (writer); Gail Simone (writer); Aaron Lopresti (artist)

In-story information
- Species: Android
- Team affiliations: Secret Society of Super Villains
- Abilities: Superhuman strength and durability Genius-level intellect Heat generation Large and medium-scale geokinesis

Red Volcano is an android supervillain published by DC Comics. He first appeared in DC Universe #0 (April 2008), and was created by Kevin VanHook, Grant Morrison, Gail Simone and Aaron Lopresti from a concept by Greg Weisman.

== Publication history ==
Red Volcano debuted in DC Universe #0, and returned in 2009's Red Tornado mini-series.

== Fictional character biography ==
Red Volcano was created by Professor Ivo and T. O. Morrow. Ivo uses him as an aide during his tenure as part of the Secret Society of Super Villains. He helps Ivo in collecting soil samples from various regions of Earth where acts of genocide took place over the past 100 years as part of a plot to create a golem called Genocide. Following the Final Crisis event, Red Volcano joins Cheetah's Secret Society of Super Villains.

In the Red Tornado miniseries, it is revealed that Red Volcano is one of four androids created by Ivo and Morrow alongside Red Tornado, Red Torpedo, and Red Inferno. He, Red Tornado, Red Inferno, and Red Torpedo respectively represent the classical elements: earth, air, fire, and water. Volcano lacks the humanity or conscience that his "siblings" have, going so far as to torture his creator into revealing the whereabouts of the other two robots. When Morrow tells him where Red Inferno is, the Volcano heads for the child robot's home neighborhood and mercilessly murders Inferno's adopted parents and destroys the entire neighborhood.

== Powers and abilities ==
Red Volcano possesses heat generating abilities and wears a cape made of molten rock.

He also has super-strength and flight, and also demonstrated geokinesis to a great extent.

== In other media ==
- Red Volcano appears in Young Justice, voiced by Jeff Bennett. In the episode "Humanity", he attempts to make the Yellowstone Caldera erupt and cause an extinction-level event before Red Tornado, Red Inferno, and Red Torpedo stop him, with Red Volcano being melted and destroyed. In the episode "Runaways", Lex Luthor rebuilds Red Volcano to attack and manipulate the eponymous group into helping the Light before Blue Beetle destroys it.
- Red Volcano appears as a character summon in Scribblenauts Unmasked: A DC Comics Adventure.
