= T. O. Morrow =

- T.O. Morrow as depicted in 52 #46 (May 2007). Art by Pat Olliffe (penciler) and David Baron (colorist).

Publication information
- Publisher: DC Comics
- First appearance: The Flash #143 (March 1964)
- Created by: Gardner Fox (writer); Carmine Infantino (artist)

In-story information
- Alter ego: Tomek Ovadya Morah
- Species: Human
- Place of origin: Poland
- Team affiliations: S.T.A.R. Labs; Science Squad; Injustice League
- Notable aliases: Thomas Oscar Morrow
- Abilities: Genius-level intellect; Proficient engineer, inventor, and roboticist

Thomas Oscar "T. O." Morrow is a supervillain appearing in American comic books published by DC Comics. He is responsible for the creation of Red Tornado, Red Inferno, Red Torpedo, Red Volcano, and Tomorrow Woman androids, the last of these with the help of Professor Ivo.

T. O. Morrow appeared in the first season of the live-action Arrowverse series Supergirl, portrayed by Iddo Goldberg. Additionally, Jeff Bennett and Ioan Gruffudd have voiced Morrow in animation.

== Publication history ==
The original T. O. Morrow (Thomas Oscar Morrow) debuted in "Trail of the False Green Lanterns", The Flash #143 (March 1964), and was created by writer Gardner Fox and artist Carmine Infantino.

The modern T. O. Morrow (Tomek Ovadya Morah) first appeared in The Flash (vol. 2) #19 (December 1988) in a story by writer William Messner-Loebs and artist Jim Mooney. Both versions are usually referred to as "T. O. Morrow" as a play on the word "tomorrow". It is generally accepted that both characters are the same man and that the name alteration came about when Morah anglicized his name to Thomas Oscar Morrow.

== Fictional character biography ==
=== Pre-Crisis ===
==== Silver Age ====
Using his technological prowess and his immense inventing abilities, T. O. Morrow (full name: Thomas Oscar Morrow) created a special "television set" that would allow him to see a century into the future. He would examine many of the futuristic instruments and then replicate them for use in his present time. Morrow spent a lot of time trying to perfect a time machine that he could use, but he was unsuccessful. The majority of his inventions were used to commit various types of crimes. Morrow utilized one of the inventions that he stole from the future that would allow him to create duplicates of other people. He used this invention to successfully create duplicates of Green Lantern. Morrow did this because he was bored with how easy it was to commit crimes and he wanted to do something that would give both the Flash and Green Lantern a challenge. The three duplicate Green Lanterns each went off to different parts of the world to steal different items at the same time. They were easily stopped by the Flash's super-speed. Morrow was transported to Earth-Two and presumed dead.

Shortly after being defeated by the Flash and Green Lantern, Morrow created Red Tornado to infiltrate the Justice Society of America so that Morrow would be able to rob the 20th Century Museum. His television screen of the future showed that he would be defeated by the JSA unless he could infiltrate the group and cause them to be unable to defend the museum. Red Tornado was inadvertently successful in stopping the JSA. Morrow returned to Earth-One and attacked the JLA. He was able to defeat them by using his inventions and he then placed them all in stasis. Red Tornado was upset about Morrow's deception that caused him to defeat the JSA and followed him to Earth-One. Red Tornado freed the members of the JLA and captured Morrow. Morrow later escaped, and he manipulated Red Tornado several more times to try to destroy the JLA. The JLA was able to easily overcome Morrow and defeat him every time.

After one particular defeat by the JLA, Morrow was drawn into another reality and split into two different people. One of the Morrows conquered an alien world and fought the Flash, the Atom, and Supergirl. The "other" Morrow was taken into the nexus of time and mutated into a higher being. He was now referring to himself as Tomorrow the Future Man. In his evolved state, his organs could not keep up with him and were failing. Morrow then transplanted his mind into the body of Red Tornado and assumed his identity. Red Tornado was able to fight back and he won his body back. The Future Man's body failed and he died.

In Crisis on Infinite Earths, the heroes call upon Morrow to heal Red Tornado, but his physiology (having been altered by the Anti-Monitor) had changed too greatly to be repaired, ultimately resulting in him exploding. During this, Morrow escaped and regrouped with several other villains to attack the heroes.

=== Post-Crisis ===
The modern T. O. Morrow's real name is Tomek Ovadya Morah, and he was born in Nasielsk, Poland. This version's first appearance was in The Flash (vol. 2) #19. He was seen at a dinner honoring the Rogues. Sometime after this, Morrow was placed in an institution in Central City. He admitted that with his time traveling and usage of all of his future inventions that he had begun to "crack up". Morrow contacted Maxwell Lord to inform him of the impending end of the world, but Max refused to listen to him. The next time that Morrow was seen, was when he attempted to go to Dr. Hannibal Martin's office to deliver him a book that he had written full of important future dates, including the date that Morrow would die. However, Martin blew him off and considered him to be delusional. Morrow would affect Lord's League again. In JLA Incarnations #6, he is contacted by Rumaan Harjavti, the dictator of Bialya, and supplies technology that neutralizes Booster Gold's battle-suit.

Morrow was not seen again for some time until the JLA re-formed. Morrow (apparently over his confused and delusional ways) teamed up with Professor Ivo to create the Tomorrow Woman. She was placed with the JLA during their recruitment drive to infiltrate and destroy the team, but like Morrow's last creation, Red Tornado, she would not follow her programming and fought with the JLA. Morrow and Ivo were both captured and sent to Belle Reve. Ivo and he bickered over who had done better work on her, whether Ivo on her body or Morrow on her mind; Morrow won by demonstrating she had shaken off her programming, which instructed her to kill the JLA, and as did Red Tornado, had discovered emotions and was developing as a real human being. While in prison, Morrow grew weary of Ivo's boasting about his creation, Amazo. To spite Ivo, Morrow contacted the JLA and gave them information about Amazo's plan to break the mad scientists out of Belle Reve, but he gave them misinformation and Amazo attacked the JLA.

Morrow was able to escape Belle Reve and he greatly tampered with the timeline. He returned to the time of the Justice Society of America and made many technological advancements that would allow his idea of a perfect future to exist. The JLA from the year 2000 went back to the JSA in 1941 to try to stop Morrow, but they were too late. Morrow had already made several changes to the timestream that would set up his idea of a perfect world. When his plans did not work out, Morrow traveled back in time and attempted to kill his mother. He believed that he would have been stronger if he had been raised as an orphan. Jay Garrick was able to intervene and show Morrow what he was about to do. Morrow changed his mind and allowed the JLA to capture him.

=== 52 ===
During DC Comics' 52 maxi-series event, T. O. Morrow was incarcerated in Haven. In fact, he was not allowed to use any computer for fear that he would incite "Machine War I". Fellow inventor Will Magnus (creator of the Metal Men) would visit with Morrow monthly to discuss an assortment of things. Morrow in such meetings revealed that he had created a brother for Red Tornado called Red Inferno, and hinted that someone was kidnapping "mad scientists" such as Dr. Sivana, Ira Quimby (I.Q.), Doctor Tyme, Doctor Death, and Dr. Cyclops, warning Magnus to be cautious. Ultimately, he was able to escape from Haven, but not before giving Magnus a machine code necessary to restore the Metal Men.

Magnus was ultimately captured by the conspiracy Morrow had mentioned and brought to Oolong Island. He was greeted by Morrow, surrounded by beautiful girls, and working freely with the other kidnapped scientists who are members of the Science Squad. Morrow informs Magnus that he has been drafted into their efforts creating weapons for Intergang, and subsequently arranges to have his antidepressants confiscated to promote his former student's more manic levels of creativity. After being targeted by Black Adam for his involvement in the creation of the Four Horsemen of Apokolips, along with his fellow scientists on Oolong Island, he helps them in subduing their angered foe, then buys back the remnants of the demolished Red Tornado from an internet auction site, hoping to extract his knowledge of the still unknown events that happened in space.

In 52 #49, the JSA attack the Oolong facility, and Magnus gives Morrow the teleporter to one of Sivana's robots allowing him to escape. Later in 52 #50, Morrow manages to see what Red Tornado saw, but is drafted by Booster Gold and Rip Hunter immediately after, to help them by luring Skeets to his lab, where the little robot is revealed to be controlled from the inside by Mr. Mind. After being surprised by Booster and Hunter, Mind dives outside reality, leaving Morrow and his lab behind.

=== After 52 ===
Morrow appeared in #2 of the Metal Men miniseries, with his own group of robots, called the "Death Metal Men". He is later revealed to be an artificial intelligence living in an android replica of Morrow, while the Death Metal Men were atomic transmutations of the Metal Men themselves. Yet the real Morrow also has a hand in the series as Will Magnus' best teacher, who unsuccessfully attempted to have him accept a grant to research robots. He was later visited by a future version of Magnus, who gave him a ring for his past self to change the past. Morrow used his time traveling gear to aid Magnus, but then reveals he intends to kick him out of the timestream after defeating the monstrous Nameless. He is defeated and is erased from history.

On the cover of Justice League of America (vol. 2) #13, Morrow appears as a member of the Injustice League. As a member of Libra's Secret Society of Super Villains, he conceives of an idea on how to create a monster strong enough to kill a member of the Justice League. The team uses his idea to create the villain Genocide. After it is created, he strongly tries to have the team destroy it due to Genocide's high level of instability. After his pleas are ignored and Wonder Woman destroys the Society's base, Morrow offers to help the Amazon stop Genocide. He reveals that he is of Polish ancestry and wants no part in anything called genocide.

=== The New 52 ===
In 2011, "The New 52" rebooted the DC universe. T. O. Morrow is reimagined as a scientist working at S.T.A.R. Labs under Silas Stone. Under orders from Silas, Morrow saves the life of Victor Stone by turning him into Cyborg.

During the "Forever Evil" storyline, Morrow is seen at S.T.A.R. Labs' Detroit branch following the Crime Syndicate's invasion. He and Silas attempt to protect the Red Room, a high-security vault, from the Crime Syndicate, who they are sure are going to strike. They have built an energy weapon. When explosions strike the door, Morrow and Silas are prepared to fire, only for them to see Batman, Catwoman, and a critically injured Cyborg. When the scientists ask where the rest of the Justice League is, Batman merely states that "they didn't make it".

== Powers and abilities ==
T. O. Morrow is a criminal mastermind and a scientific genius. He has also created technology that allows him to see into the future.

== Other versions ==
An alternate timeline version of T. O. Morrow appears in Flashpoint. This version created the Red Tornadoes to defend the Republic of Japan from the Amazon/Atlantean war.

== In other media ==
=== Television ===
- T. O. Morrow appears in Young Justice, voiced by Jeff Bennett. This version is an elderly scientist assisted by Bromwell Stikk and a member of the Light who previously built Red Inferno, Red Torpedo, and Red Tornado in failed attempts to infiltrate and destroy the Justice Society of America and Justice League in his younger years, with Red Tornado going on to join the latter. In the present, Morrow employs an android double of his younger self in several failed attempts to capture and reprogram Red Tornado and destroy the League.
- T. O. Morrow appears in the Supergirl episode "Red Faced", portrayed by Iddo Goldberg. This version built Red Tornado to kill Kryptonians on General Sam Lane's orders. After Supergirl destroys the android, Morrow is fired. He attempts to seek revenge on Lane, but is thwarted by Supergirl and killed by Alex Danvers.

=== Film ===
- T. O. Morrow appears in Justice League: War, voiced by Ioan Gruffudd. This version played a role in helping Silas Stone turn the latter's son Victor into Cyborg.
- An alternate universe version of Thomas Morrow appears in Justice League: Gods and Monsters as a member of Lex Luthor's "Project Fair Play", a weapons program meant to destroy their universe's Justice League if necessary. After three of their number are killed, most of the remaining scientists regroup at Karen Beecher's house, but are killed by the Metal Men.

=== Video games ===
- T. O. Morrow appears in DC Universe Online, voiced by Jens Andersen.
- T.O. Morrow appears as a character summon in Scribblenauts Unmasked: A DC Comics Adventure.

=== Miscellaneous ===
T. O. Morrow appears in Smallville Season 11 #10 as a S.T.A.R. Labs scientist.
