= Amazo =

DC Comics character

- Amazo, as it appeared on DC Comics website's character page. Art by Doug Mahnke

Publication information
- First appearance: The Brave and the Bold #30 (June 1960)
- Created by: Gardner Fox; Mike Sekowsky; Murphy Anderson

In-story information
- Alter ego: Armen Ikarus
- Species: Android; Sentient virus
- Team affiliations: Injustice League; Secret Society of Super Villains; Cabal
- Notable aliases: Professor Ivo's Amazing Android (As Ikarus): Doctor Armen Ikarus; Patient Zero
- Abilities: Power duplication; Weapon mimicry; Computer intelligence; (Virus version): Power manipulation; Shapeshifting; Superhuman strength and durability; Telepathy

Amazo is a fictional character appearing in American comic books published by DC Comics. The character was created by Gardner Fox and Mike Sekowsky and first appeared in The Brave and the Bold #30 (June 1960) as an adversary of the Justice League of America. Since debuting during the Silver Age of Comic Books, the character has appeared in comic books and other DC Comics-related products, including animated television series, trading cards and video games.

Traditionally, Amazo is an android created by the villain scientist Anthony Ivo and gifted with technology that allows him to mimic the abilities and powers of superheroes he fights (usually the Justice League), as well as make copies of their weapons (though these copies are less powerful than the originals). His default powers are often those of the Flash, Aquaman, Martian Manhunter, Wonder Woman, and Green Lantern (the Justice League founding members that he first fought). He is similar and often compared with the later created Marvel characters Super-Adaptoid and Ultimo, who were both introduced in 1966.

In the New 52 timeline of DC Comics, Amazo begins as the A-Maze Operating System and then becomes an android capable of duplicating superhuman powers. Later on, a sentient Amazo Virus infects research scientist Armen Ikarus and takes over his mind. With Ikarus as a host, the Amazo Virus infects other people, granting them super-powers and controlling their minds before they die within 24 hours.

Amazo has been substantially adapted into media outside comics. Robert Picardo, Peter MacNicol, Thomas Lennon, and Nolan North, among others, have voiced the character in animated television series and films. Amazo also appears in the live-action Arrowverse crossover event "Elseworlds".

== Publication history ==
Amazo first appeared in a one-off story in The Brave and the Bold #30 (June 1960) and returned as an opponent of the Justice League of America in Justice League of America #27 (May 1964) and #112 (August 1974), plus a briefer appearance in #65 when another antagonist weaponized Amazo and other items from the JLA trophy room. Other significant issues included an encounter with a depowered Superman in Action Comics #480-483 (February – May 1978), and in Justice League of America #191 (June 1981) and #241-243 (August – October 1985). Amazo also battles a fully powered Superman in Superman Special #3 (1985).

A different Amazo model featured in Justice League Quarterly #12 (Fall 1993) and battled the hero Aztek in Aztek: The Ultimate Man #10 (May 1997) before being destroyed in Resurrection Man #2 (June 1997). An advanced version debuted in a one-off story in JLA #27 (March 1999), while another appeared in the limited series Hourman, specifically issues #1, #5-7, #17, and #19-21 (April 1999 – December 2000).

Amazo's origin is revealed in Secret Origins of Super-Villains 80-Page Giant #1 (December 1999). Another version is discovered to be part of a weapons shipment in Batman #636-637 (March – April 2005) and during the Villains United storyline in Firestorm vol. 2 #14-16 (August – October 2005), Villains United #5-6 (November – December 2005), and the Villains United: Infinite Crisis Special (June 2006).

Amazo's consciousness returned in Justice League of America #1-5 (October 2006 – March 2007), planted in the body of fellow android Red Tornado. Ivo also created Amazo's "offspring" in JLA Classified #37-41 (June – October 2007). A story continuing the first Red Tornado storyline featured in Justice League of America vol. 2 #21-23 (July – September 2008).

Writer Mike Conroy noted: "Amazo was a persistent thorn in the JLA's side... although his programming and own sentience have displayed no ambition towards world conquest... His very existence is a hazard to all of humanity".

== Fictional character biography ==
=== Modern Age ===
The android Amazo was created by Professor Anthony Ivo, a scientist with expertise in multiple fields who is obsessed with immortality. The original Justice League of America (Green Lantern, Flash, Aquaman, Wonder Woman, and Martian Manhunter) discover their powers are being drained and somehow then being used by a thief who is after animals known to have long lifespans. While attempting to discover the perpetrator, the League is confronted and defeated by Amazo, who has duplicated their powers using Ivo's "absorption cell" technology. Amazo brings the team to Ivo, who reveals he has created a means of extending his lifespan courtesy of the data obtained from studying the creatures Amazo captured. The League then defeats Ivo and the android. Ivo's immortality results in his body becoming monstrous in form, and the android is stored in the League trophy room.

The android is temporarily re-activated twice to assist the League in regaining lost abilities. When red sun radiation reaches Earth, Amazo reactivates and engages in an extensive battle with Superman involving time-travel, only to be defeated before it can murder Ivo and the League. Key, having been shrunken in size, re-activates Amazo in a failed bid to return to normal. The League defeats Amazo, after which Zatanna restores Key to his former state.

After the Justice League of America disbands and reforms as a small team of mostly new heroes based in Detroit, Ivo reactivates Amazo to attack this less experienced, "weaker" League. The android defeats all the new members but is finally stopped by Justice League founding members Martian Manhunter and Aquaman.

A different Amazo model is later activated and battles the superhero team the Conglomerate. This updated Amazo searches for Ivo and encounters the hero Aztek, who succeeds in reasoning with the android rather than overpowering it. This Amazo model also briefly battles Resurrection Man before finally being destroyed. Before his destruction, the second model of Amazo is summoned into the future by the android hero Hourman, who wishes to meet his "ancestor". This Amazo copies Hourman's time-warping Worlogog, becoming "Timazo" in the process. Timazo wreaks havoc with his new ability to manipulate time, but is defeated and returned to the past so his history can run its course.

Another model of Amazo is activated that can wield multiple powers at once and is programmed to automatically upgrade its abilities to match those of all active Justice League members. Initially not understanding this upgrade, the Justice League calls in reserve members to help defeat Amazo, which only results in its power increasing. On the Atom's advice, Superman (active team chairman at the time) announces the League is officially disbanded. Programmed only to mimic the powers of active members, this Amazo is suddenly depowered and easily deactivated. Years later, Batman and Nightwing discover a partially built Amazo android in a weapons shipment and destroy it.

Another Amazo participates in a massive attack by a group of villains on the city of Metropolis, but is destroyed by Black Adam.

It is revealed that after perfecting Amazo's absorption cells, Ivo combined this technology with human ova and DNA to create a "son" of Amazo who grows up as Frank Halloran, unaware of his heritage. Years later, Frank is a philosophy student dating a young woman named Sara when his powers are awakened prematurely. Rather than emulate his villainous "father", Frank hopes to be a hero called "Kid Amazo". Slowly becoming mentally unstable, Kid Amazo discovers Sara is Ivo's daughter and was instructed to monitor Frank by posing as a girlfriend. Kid Amazo goes on a rampage. Batman deduces Kid Amazo has not only the powers of the Leaguers but also their contrasting personality traits. This is later used to cause greater internal instability, destroying Kid Amazo.

Ivo downloads Amazo's programming into the body of Red Tornado, the android villain-turned-hero created by Professor T. O. Morrow, another enemy of the Justice League. The League battles an army of Red Tornado androids before discovering that the villain Solomon Grundy intends to transfer his mind into the original android Tornado's body. Although this plan is defeated, the Amazo programming asserts itself and attacks the League until member Vixen destroys it. A new body is created to house Red Tornado's consciousness but the Amazo programming inhabits it instead, battling Justice League before he is defeated by being teleported into the gravity well of the red star Antares.

=== The New 52 ===
As part of The New 52, the new origin story of the Justice League references the "A-Maze Operating System" and "B-Maze Operating System" designed by Anthony Ivo. The League later battles an android equipped with a corrupt version of this operating system.

During the Forever Evil storyline, Amazo appears as a member of the Secret Society of Super Villains.

During the "Amazo Virus" storyline, a biotech pathogen is created based on the android's absorption cells. The first person to be infected by this virus is former LexCorp research scientist Armen Ikarus, whose mind is corrupted in the process and replaced by the virus's will. Now possessing power and driven to infect others, Ikarus's personality is replaced by the new Amazo. The Ikarus Amazo infects others, granting them super-powers based on desires and personality traits, but killing them within 24 hours. The Ikarus Amazo, able to enhance infected humans and control them through a "hive-mind" connection, is defeated by the Justice League. Young Reggie Meyer and his family are also affected. Influenced by technology from the original Amazo android, Reggie becomes the second Kid Amazo.

=== DC Rebirth ===
In 2016, DC Comics implemented another relaunch of its books called "DC Rebirth" which restored its continuity to a form much as it was prior to "The New 52". In the storyline Outbreak, Amazo is one of the villains recruited by an A.I. named Genie, created by the daughter of computer technician James Palmer. His technology cells are later hacked and he briefly joins the Justice League's side.

Amazo later appears as a member of the Cabal, alongside Per Degaton, Doctor Psycho, Queen Bee, and Hugo Strange. Amazo re-appeared in the pages of Batman/Superman: World's Finest #16 with Metamorpho abilities labeled NewMazo with aide by Will Magnus of the Metal Men. It also created an ally in the form of Ultra-Morpho.

=== Dawn of DC ===
In Absolute Power, Amanda Waller and Failsafe create an army of Amazos in a bid to steal the powers of all metahumans. However, Green Lantern's Amazo counterpart Jadestone unexpectedly gains sentience after absorbing the power of Alan Scott's Starheart and begins working against Waller. The Justice League manages to destroy the Amazos, returning the stolen powers to their original powers. Jadestone survives and goes on to become the guardian of the Green Lantern central power battery.

== Powers and abilities ==
=== Amazo (Android) ===
Amazo is an advanced android built using Professor Anthony Ivo's "absorption cell" technology. This technology (later indicated to involve nanites) allows Amazo's cells to mimic the physical structure and energy output of organic beings he encounters, empowering him to mimic physical and energy-based abilities (such as the strength of Superman, the speed of the Flash, or the fighting skill of Batman). Amazo's internal energy source provides power for these abilities, so it does not matter what source of power is used by the superhuman he is mimicking (such as Wonder Woman's speed being based on magical empowerment and Superman's speed being a result of Kryptonian cells fueled by solar radiation). After his first story, many Amazo models retain the powers of the first five founding Leaguers he met as a default power set, absorbing new abilities based on other Leaguers they encounter. The models are usually only able to access a single target's unique attributes at a time. Some models have internally possessed the powers of many Justice League members, not just founding members, in their internal database and can summon them at will, but again only utilizing one person's powers at a time. Some later Amazo versions are upgraded to use and mimic multiple powers at once from any superhuman they come in contact with or anyone it identifies as a Justice League member. Several Amazo models can create duplicates of weapons as well, such as the power ring of Green Lantern, the metal mace of Hawkgirl, or the lasso of Wonder Woman. These copied weapons are more limited in power than the original products.

At times, Amazo is a simple-minded android, capable of basic strategies and possessing average intelligence but with narrow focus. Some models of Amazo have demonstrated advanced analysis and tactics in battle, helping them maneuver to apply their stolen powers effectively to defeat opponents. In most incarnations, Amazo takes on a person's weaknesses simultaneously when mimicking their powers (as an example, becoming vulnerable to kryptonite radiation while using Superman abilities). Multiple stories have also indicated that his android body, designed to emulate the form and function of a human being, also possesses the pressure points and stress spots the average human body possesses.

=== Amazo (Ikarus) ===
Armen Ikarus is a former scientist and researcher at LexCorp who is the first to be exposed to the Amazo Virus outbreak. This version of Amazo is driven to infect others with the Amazo virus, causing them to develop psychoactive superhuman abilities based on inherent desires and characteristics before dying within 24 hours. Ikarus can emulate technology and super-powers he encountered by crudely modifying his genetic structure and biological structure. In addition, Ikarus can remotely augment the physical abilities of anyone infected with the Amazo virus and influence their behavior through establishing a mental "hive-mind" connection. Initially, Ikarus's body seemed to degenerate from the strain of the virus altering his biology, but later his form stabilized and evolved into the appearance of the classic Amazo android.

== Other versions ==
A funny animal-inspired counterpart of Amazo called "Amazoo", a robotic chimera of a dozen different animal body parts and abilities, from "Earth-C-Minus" appears in Captain Carrot and His Amazing Zoo Crew! #14-15.

== In other media ==
=== Television ===
- Amazo appears in series set in the DC Animated Universe (DCAU), voiced by Robert Picardo.
  - Introduced in the Justice League episode "Tabula Rasa" and initially referred to simply as the "Android", this version is a gray, blank humanoid capable of accessing several replicated abilities simultaneously and gradually removing weaknesses. While looking for Professor Ivo to help him fix his battle suit, Lex Luthor finds Amazo and uses him to steal the Justice League's abilities and the parts he needs to fix his suit. After absorbing J'onn J'onzz's abilities however, Amazo takes on a gold coloration and leaves Earth to find the meaning behind his existence.
  - As of the Justice League Unlimited episode "The Return", Amazo has attained godlike power and the ability to teleport. He intends to kill Luthor for using him, but gives up this quest after fighting Doctor Fate and is given sanctuary in the Tower of Fate to find his purpose.
- Amazo appears in the Young Justice episode "Schooled", voiced by Peter MacNicol.
- Amazo appears in the Batman: The Brave and the Bold episode "Triumvirate of Terror!", voiced by Roger Rose. This version is a member of the Legion of Doom.
- Amazo appears in the Justice League Action episode "Boo-ray for Bizarro", voiced by Thomas Lennon. In addition to replicating a target's skills, powers, and personal tools, this version is also able to replicate mental prowess.
- A.M.A.Z.O. (Anti Metahuman Adaptive Zootomic Organism) appears in "Elseworlds". This version was built by Ivo Laboratories for A.R.G.U.S. to replicate the natural skills and special abilities of any extraordinary, metahuman, and extraterrestrial individual it comes across. After Dr. John Deegan's attempts to alter reality cause Oliver Queen and Barry Allen to switch lives instead, the former unknowingly activates A.M.A.Z.O. while thwarting a robbery at Ivo Laboratories. Upon learning of what happened and receiving help from Cisco Ramon, Supergirl, and Superman, Queen and Allen defeat the android. After altering reality, Deegan recruits A.M.A.Z.O. to assist him until it is destroyed by Brainiac 5.

=== Film ===
- Amazo appears in Batman: Under the Red Hood, voiced by Fred Tatasciore. This version has the same weak points as a human being.
- Amazo appears in Injustice. This version was built by Ra's al Ghul ostensibly to help Superman enforce global peace, but with the secret goal of killing Superman after replicating his powers. After becoming violent in its quest to maintain order, Superman and his allies join forces with Batman's resistance to fight Amazo. It kills Hawkman and Cyborg before Plastic Man destroys it from the inside.
- Amazo appears in Justice League: Crisis on Infinite Earths, voiced by Nolan North.

=== Video games ===
- Amazo appears in Justice League: Chronicles.
- Amazo appears as a character summon in Scribblenauts Unmasked: A DC Comics Adventure.

=== Miscellaneous ===
- Amazo appears in DC Super Friends #18.
- Amazo appears in the Injustice 2 prequel comic. After being forced by the League of Assassins to build Amazo, Professor Ivo sells him off to a terrorist initiative led by Ra's al Ghul and Solovar.
- The DCAU incarnation of Amazo and his alternate universe counterpart Amazo-II appear in Justice League Infinity. The latter is a version of him who fused with the Anti-Life Equation before being cleansed by the main universe Amazo, after which they leave to travel the multiverse together.
- Amazo appears in the My Adventures with Superman tie-in comic. This version is a former war android created by the Kryptonian Empire that was captured by Checkmate's Team 7 to be used as a weapon before escaping with Superman's help.

== See also ==
- Kid Amazo
- Super-Adaptoid, a Marvel Comics supervillain with similar superpowers
