= Crime Doctor (comics) =

The Crime Doctor is the name of several supervillains appearing in American comic books published by DC Comics. The Crime Doctor is an underworld medical expert who caters exclusively to criminals, originally an enemy of Batman.

== Publication history ==
The first Crime Doctor first appeared in Detective Comics #77 (July 1943), and was created by Bill Finger and Bob Kane.

== Fictional character biography ==
=== Matthew Thorne ===
Crime Doctor
- The Crime Doctor as depicted on the cover of Detective Comics #77 (July 1943). Art by Bob Kane.

Publication information
- Publisher: DC Comics
- First appearance: Detective Comics #77 (July 1943)
- Created by: Bill Finger (writer); Bob Kane (artist)(writer); Michael Gaydos (artist)

In-story information
- Alter ego: Dr. Matthew Thorne
- Species: Human
- Place of origin: Earth
- Team affiliations: Secret Society of Super Villains
- Abilities: Skilled surgeon Expert torturer Use of injector gun and scalpel

On Earth-Two, Matthew Thorne is a doctor who treats criminals. His consultation with his patients have attracted the attention of Batman and Robin. Thanks to Batman's tracer invention, they are able to find his hideout. After an injured man shows up during the confrontation. Batman and the Crime Doctor work together to save the man's life. Afterwards, the Crime Doctor traps Batman and Robin and has them tied up. He and his assistant target a formula that can change the atomic order of objects. Upon obtaining it, the Crime Doctor heads to Eastington Atom Smasher to turn the base metal there into gold. After escaping, Batman and Robin catch up to the Crime Doctor. They defeat the Crime Doctor and his assistant, who are arrested.

Shortly after this, the Crime Doctor escapes prison and reopens his clinic far away from Gotham. Batman and Robin learn of his escape and chase the Crime Doctor to California, where the Crime Doctor saves Robin's life after he is shot by one of the doctor's henchmen. In the end, the Crime Doctor is betrayed by one of his own men, who shoots him in the back. Before dying, the Crime Doctor apologized to Batman for his criminal actions.

=== Bradford Thorne ===
Crime Doctor

Publication information
- Publisher: DC Comics
- First appearance: Detective Comics #494 (September 1980)
- Created by: Michael Fleisher (writer); Don Newton (artist)

In-story information
- Alter ego: Dr. Bradford Thorne
- Species: Human
- Place of origin: Earth
- Abilities: Skilled surgeon Expert torturer Use of injector gun and scalpel

On Earth-One, Bradford Thorne is a notorious physician who provides criminal services as the Crime Doctor. Thorne assists criminals using his medical knowledge in return for a small percentage of the stolen loot. His modus operandi stumps the authorities of Gotham City and causes Batman to turn his attention on his crimes. Thorne eventually learns Batman's secret identity when Bruce Wayne goes to see him, seeking his medical support. When the underworld learn that Thorne knew Batman's secret, Thorne is kidnapped by businessman Sterling Silversmith, who poisons him with mercury to make him reveal the truth. Batman stops Silversmith, but Thorne's body had been damaged by mercury poisoning. It is stated that Thorne would likely be left in a permanent vegetative state; if he recovered, his memory would be completely wiped out.

In post-Crisis continuity, the Crime Doctor recovers from his poisoning. He is now served by Rench, who acts as his nurse and bodyguard. The Crime Doctor is visited by Two-Face, who wants him to do a specific operation. Batman and Robin suspect that the Crime Doctor is going to do a heart operation on crime boss Moe McAllister by giving him Schulyer Reems' heart. With help from Reems, Batman and Robin defeat the Crime Doctor, Nurse Rench, and the rest of the Crime Doctor's minions.

Crime Doctor and Rench appear as members of Alexander Luthor Jr.'s Secret Society of Super Villains.

In the "Progeny" arc of Birds of Prey, the Crime Doctor tries to "defect" from the Secret Society of Super Villains. The Society sends Prometheus to repay the Crime Doctor by torturing and killing his daughter as he had done to his victims. After a battle, the Birds of Prey almost manage to subdue Prometheus, but the Crime Doctor decides to kill himself, thus ensuring his own punishment. His daughter Bethany, alone and outcast by the other children, is manipulated by Lady Shiva.

The Crime Doctor is resurrected following the "Infinite Frontier" relaunch. He operates on Respawn and tries his best to keep him alive after he is severely injured. After Respawn apparently dies, Crime Doctor informs Deathstroke.

=== Anica Balcescu ===
Crime Doctor

Publication information
- Publisher: DC Comics
- First appearance: Manhunter (vol. 3) #32 (September 2008)
- Created by: Marc Andreyko (writer); Michael Gaydos (artist)

In-story information
- Alter ego: Dr. Anica Balcescu
- Species: Human
- Place of origin: Earth
- Team affiliations: Secret Society of Super Villains
- Abilities: Skilled surgeon Expert torturer Use of injector gun and scalpel

Following Matthew Thorne's death, a new Crime Doctor named Anica Balcescu, is introduced. She is a Romanian widow and a survivor of Nicolae Ceaușescu's regime who later joins the Secret Society.

When working for Cheetah's Secret Society of Super Villains, Crime Doctor grafted the Lasso of Truth that was stolen from Wonder Woman onto Genocide.

== Powers and abilities ==
The original Crime Doctor had no superhuman abilities, but was a skilled physician and expert torturer. He sometimes wielded an injector gun or scalpel.

== In other media ==
- The Matthew Thorne incarnation of the Crime Doctor appears in the Batman: The Animated Series episode "Paging the Crime Doctor", voiced by Joseph Campanella. This version is the brother of Rupert Thorne. He previously attended medical school with Thomas Wayne and Leslie Thompkins, but lost his medical license after failing to file a report about Rupert's gunshot wound. Subsequently, Matthew worked under Rupert as the Crime Doctor in hopes of regaining his license. Matthew later assists Batman in defeating Rupert before turning himself in to the police.
- Matthew Thorne appears in the Batman: Caped Crusader episode "The Killer Inside Me", voiced by Josh Keaton. This version is the teenage son of Rupert Thorne.
