= List of DC Comics characters: R =

== Rag Doll ==
Rag Doll is the name of several supervillains appearing in American comic books published by DC Comics. The first, Peter Merkel, is a villain of the original Flash, the second is an enemy of Starman, and the third is Merkel's son and a member of the Secret Six. The Peter Merkel incarnation of Rag Doll was created by writer Gardner Fox and artist Lou Ferstadt, and first appeared in Flash Comics #36 (December 1942).

=== Peter Merkel ===
Peter Merkel, a native of the Midwestern United States, was born with highly flexible joints. The son of a side-show barker, Merkel found work in a carnival as a contortionist and performer. In the early 1940s, the carnival fell on hard times and eventually closed, leaving Merkel without a job. He eventually became a criminal, using his abilities as a contortionist to his advantage.

As he ages, Rag Doll's ligaments collapse and over-extend, causing him great pain. He eventually makes a deal with Neron to restore his youth and abilities in exchange for his soul. Soon afterward, Rag Doll dies while on a mission with the reformed Injustice Society.

In September 2011, The New 52 reboots DC's continuity. Merkel is resurrected and appears as an inmate of Arkham Asylum.

=== Colby Zag ===
Jack Knight has also squared off against a mentally unbalanced impostor named Colby Zag. During the time when the original Rag Doll was believed dead, Zag met band player Mr. Tyrell through the internet. Tyrell had bribed his former bandmates to keep quiet about his involvement in a drug related death. Eventually, his bandmates began extorting more money from him, so Tyrell planned to kill them. He helped Zag adopt the personality and mannerisms of Rag Doll and sent him to kill the extortionists. Zag succeeded in killing four of the five men, but was stopped thanks to the intervention of Jack Knight.

=== Rag Doll in other media ===
- The Peter Merkel incarnation of Rag Doll appears in The Batman, voiced by Jeff Bennett.
- The Peter Merkel incarnation of Rag Doll appears in The Flash, portrayed by Troy James and voiced by Phil LaMarr. This version is a member of the Young Rogues who comes from a wealthy yet neglectful family and gained his abilities after being crushed by shrapnel from the Thinker's Enlightenment satellite.
- The Peter Merkel Jr. incarnation of Rag Doll makes a non-speaking appearance in the Harley Quinn episode "Icons Only" as an entertainer at Las Vegas.
- The Peter Merkel incarnation of Rag Doll appears in Batman: Caped Crusader.

== Raijin ==
Raijin is a character appearing in American comic books published by DC Comics. The character, created by Joshua Williamson and Neil Googe, first appeared in The Flash (vol. 5) #35 (January 2018). He is an enforcer of Black Hole. Raijin conspired with Gorilla Grodd, Negative Flash and Multiplex in order to utilize a Speed Force storm to hold Central City hostage, only to be defeated by The Flash.

== Rama Kushna ==
Rama Kushna is a character appearing in American comic books published by DC Comics. Created by writer Arnold Drake and artist Carmine Infantino, she first appeared in Strange Adventures #205 (October 1967).

Rama Kushna is a goddess of karma and guardian of Nanda Parbat who empowered the ghost of Boston Brand to become Deadman and seek vengeance for his murder.

=== Rama Kushna in other media ===
- Rama Kushna appears in the Justice League Unlimited episode "Dead Reckoning", voiced by an uncredited Juliet Landau.
- Rama Kushna appears in issue #37 of the Justice League Unlimited tie-in comic.
- Rama Kushna makes a non-speaking appearance in Justice League Dark.
- Rama Kushna appears in Injustice, voiced by Laura Bailey.

== Armando Ramon ==
- First appearance: Justice League of America #233 (December 1984)
- Created by: Gerry Conway and Chuck Patton
- Aliases: Reverb, Rupture, Hardline
- Further reading: Armando Ramon at Comic Vine; Armando Ramon at League of Comic Geeks

Armando Ramon is a character appearing in American comic books published by DC Comics. Created by Gerry Conway and Chuck Patton, he first appeared in Justice League of America #233 (December 1984), as Reverb in Justice League Quarterly #1 (January 1991), and as Rupture in Justice League of America's Vibe #6 (September 2013).

He is the older brother of Cisco Ramon / Vibe and Dante Ramon. Ramon was the leader of a street gang, Los Lobos, in Detroit, Michigan. Reverb joins a corporate-sponsored superhero team, the Conglomerate. The New 52 features the character as Rupture, an interdimensional bounty hunter.

Ramon has the metahuman ability to manipulate sound waves as Reverb in a manner similar to Vibe and later channels his abilities through a scythe as Rupture.

=== Armando Ramon in other media ===
- Armando Ramon appears in Justice League Unlimited #15.
- An alternate universe version of Reverb appears in The Flash (2014), as the Earth-2 counterpart of Francisco "Cisco" Ramon (portrayed by Carlos Valdes).

== Dante Ramon ==
- First appearance: Justice League of America's Vibe #1 (April 2013)
- Created by: Andrew Kreisberg, Geoff Johns and Pete Woods

Dante Ramon is a character appearing in American comic books published by DC Comics. Created by Andrew Kreisberg, Geoff Johns, and Pete Woods, he first appeared in Justice League of America's Vibe #1 (April 2013). He is the older brother of Cisco Ramon / Vibe and the younger brother of Armando Ramon.

=== Dante Ramon in other media ===
Characters based on Dante Ramon, amalgamated with Armando Ramon, appear in The Flash, portrayed by Nicholas Gonzalez.

- The Earth-1 version takes Armando's place as Cisco Ramon's older brother, with whom he has a rocky relationship. The pair later reconcile, but Dante is killed in a car accident off-screen due to Barry Allen creating and undoing the "Flashpoint" timeline.
- The Earth-2 version is Rupture, a metahuman enforcer for Zoom who appears in a self-titled episode. He attacks Cisco, having been misled into believing the latter killed his brother Reverb, but is defeated by Allen and killed by Zoom for his failure.

== Rana Dorada ==
Rana Dorada is a character appearing in American comic books published by DC Comics. The character was created by writer Mark Waid and artist Dan Mora, and made his first appearance in Batman/Superman: World's Finest #21 (November 2023). Rana Dorada was originally introduced as being from Earth-22, the setting of Kingdom Come; his main universe counterpart was introduced in the 2024 storyline Absolute Power.

Rana Dorada is a frog-themed vigilante from Costa Rica who possesses the agility of a frog and the ability to generate electricity. He, along with Cadejos, assists the Justice League during Absolute Power, when Amanda Waller turns much of the public against superheroes. Following Absolute Power, Rana Dorada and Cadejos join the Justice League as part of the group's expanded lineup.

== Ranx the Sentient City ==
Ranx the Sentient City first appeared in Tales of the Green Lantern Corps Annual #2 (1986), where it is prophesied to destroy Mogo and end the Green Lantern Corps.

Ranx appears in present times, where it faces off against Guy Gardner and the Lantern Chthos-Chthas Chthatis. According to Chthos-Chthas, Ranx was once a port until it became overrun with crime and was shut down by the Green Lantern Corps. Ranx interferes with Gardner and Cthos-Chthas's investigation until Gardner threatens to destroy its central processor. Gardner and Chthos-Chthas are expelled into space after a fugitive detonates a bomb within Ranx.

Ranx later returns, allied with the Sinestro Corps, apparently under the promise of revenge against Gardner. Ranx is at the frontline of the Sinestro Corps' attack on Mogo until it is destroyed by Sodam Yat.

=== Ranx the Sentient City in other media ===
- Ranx the Sentient City makes a background appearance in DC Universe Online.
- Ranx the Sentient City appears as a character summon in Scribblenauts Unmasked: A DC Comics Adventure.

== Raptor ==
Raptor is the name of several characters in DC Comics.

=== Brotherhood of Quetzalcoatl member ===
The Raptor name was first used by an unnamed woman who is a member of the Brotherhood of Quetzalcoatl.

=== Jace Lorens ===
Jace Lorens is a pharmaceutical technician who operated as Raptor.

=== Cunningham ===
A man named Cunningham is the second person to become Raptor after the death of Jace Lorens.

=== Richard ===
"DC Rebirth" introduced Richard, a freelance assassin and ally of the Court of Owls.

=== The Cosmic Raptor ===
"New Justice" introduced The Cosmic Raptor, a giant cosmic bird sent to seal Perpetua in the Source Wall.

== Razer ==
Razer is the name of three characters appearing in American comic books published by DC Comics.

=== First version ===
The first version of Razer is an original character created for Green Lantern: The Animated Series, voiced by Jason Spisak. He is a Volkregian alien who joined the Red Lantern Corps after Atrocitus conquered his homeworld and killed his wife Ilana. After learning of this, Razer defects from the Red Lanterns and joins Hal Jordan and Kilowog in stopping them.

Throughout the series, Razer falls in love with Aya, an artificial intelligence created by Scar as an empathetic alternative to the Manhunters. In the episode "Cold Fury", Razer rejects Aya, causing her to steal the Anti-Monitor's body and take control of the Manhunters. After injuring Razer, Aya comes to her senses and sacrifices herself to stop the Manhunters, who each possess a part of her programming. Unable to accept Aya's death, Razer leaves Oa to find her, with a Blue Lantern ring following him.

Razer later appears in the main comics continuity in Green Lantern vol. 7 #6 (2024), written by The Animated Series writer Jeremy Adams. In the comics, Razer is depicted as a former member of the Red and Blue Lantern Corps who becomes a Green Lantern after the other corps' central power batteries are destroyed. He later rejoins the Red Lanterns while battling the forces of Starbreaker, taking the power ring of a recently deceased Red Lantern.

=== Janine Fulton ===
Janine Fulton is a member of the Mercs who possesses flight and energy projection abilities.

=== Third version ===
An unnamed version of Razer fought Commander Cold of the Renegades. His armor is strong enough for bullets to slide off his armor. Razer was later recruited by Eobard Thawne to join the Legion of Zoom.

=== Razer in other media ===
- Razer as a Red Lantern and Blue Lantern appears in the Young Justice episode "Encounter Upon the Razor's Edge!", voiced again by Jason Spisak.
- Razer as a Blue Lantern appears in Justice League: Crisis on Infinite Earths, voiced again by Jason Spisak.

== Red Beetle ==
Red Beetle is the name of several characters in DC Comics. The character is a counterpart of Blue Beetle.

=== First version ===
The first version appeared as Red Beetle in Booster Gold vol. 2 #24 (November 2009). He posed as a time criminal from Earth 1 in order to manipulate the timeline and to utilize cannibalized Scarab technology, but he is defeated by Booster Gold and Rip Hunter.

=== Sara Butters ===
Sara Butters was created by Marc Guggenheim and Scott Kolins, and first appeared in Justice Society of America vol. 3 #48 (April 2011). She is a member of the Justice Society of America who is inspired by Ted Kord.

=== Paco Testas ===
Paco Testas, a friend of Jaime Reyes, is Blood Beetle due to the Transbiotic Antitrauma Unit (T.A.U), a variation of the Khaji Da scarab.

=== Earth 3 version ===
An unidentified Earth 3 version is briefly seen in Crime Syndicate #2 (June 2021), as one of the villains controlled by Starro who eventually joined the Crime Syndicate.

=== Javier Basualdo ===
Javier Basualdo was possessed by Kha-Ef-Re as Blood Scarab.

=== Red Beetle in other media ===
- An original incarnation called the Scarlet Scarab appears in the Batman: The Brave and the Bold episode "Deep Cover for Batman!", voiced by Will Friedle. This version is an alternate universe version of Jaime Reyes.
- An unidentified incarnation of Red Beetle appears in Justice League: Crisis on Two Earths as a member of the Crime Syndicate's "Made Men".

== Red Devil ==
Red Devil is the name of several characters appearing in American comic books published by DC Comics.

=== Edward Bloomberg ===
Edward Bloomberg (currently known as Red Devil) is a superhero appearing in American comic books published by DC Comics. Created by Alan Kupperberg, Dan Mishkin, and Gary Cohn, the character first appeared in The Fury of Firestorm #24 (June 1984). Eddie was originally codenamed Kid Devil and was the sidekick to fellow superhero Blue Devil, and wielded similar powers by way of a suit. Eddie later became a member of the Teen Titans shortly after acquiring demon-like metahuman abilities.

Eddie is originally a gofer in his aunt Marla's film company. He meets Blue Devil on a film set and becomes a fan of the hero, dreaming of being his sidekick. Edward secretly creates a battlesuit based on Blue Devil's own and becomes the hero Kid Devil. He assists Blue Devil in several adventures despite him not wanting a sidekick.

Following Infinite Crisis, Eddie attempts to join the Teen Titans with little success. One evening, Eddie is visited by a cloaked figure, who gives him a candle. After he lights the candle, Eddie and Zachary Zatara are taken to Neron. Neron makes a deal with Eddie, transforming him into a demon-like superhuman. As part of the deal, Neron agrees to not take Eddie's soul if he can still trust Blue Devil by his 20th birthday.

On a Titans mission, Eddie is attacked by Plasmus, who badly burns his chest, and is taken by the Doom Patrol for treatment. The Chief reveals to Elasti-Girl that Kid Devil had a latent metagene that enabled him to gain powers from Neron.

Soon afterward, the Titans begin a membership drive, with Red Devil teleporting to each potential hero so as to offer them membership. However, none seem available or willing to join. Robin opts to leave the team shortly before Brother Blood returns from Hell. In the ensuing battle, Blood absorbs Eddie's powers, returning him to his human form.

In The New 52 continuity reboot, Eddie Bloomberg is reimagined as Blue Devil's godson. He is later depicted as having regained his powers and rejoins the Teen Titans.

=== Powers and abilities of Red Devil ===
Originally, Eddie wore a devil suit which gave him enhanced strength and durability and a weapons system that included a bright light burst effect, exploding bubbles, night vision, and small gills. He also had a rocket trident which could propel him through the air and generate fire and electricity. After the events of "Infinite Crisis" and 52, Neron transforms Eddie into a demon-like being with metahuman abilities. His new form gives him enhanced strength and durability, a healing factor, pyrokinesis, retractable patagia underneath his arms that enable him to glide, a prehensile tail, and the ability to create fiery portals.

=== Other versions of Red Devil ===
A possible future version of Eddie Bloomberg appears in the Titans Tomorrow storyline. Now known as Red Devil, he has lost his soul to Neron and received enhanced power in turn. After Robin and Wonder Girl alter the future, Red Devil is erased from existence.

=== Red Devil in other media ===
Eddie Bloomberg as Kid Devil appears as a character summon in Scribblenauts Unmasked: A DC Comics Adventure.

== Red Hood ==
The Red Hood is an alias used by multiple characters appearing in American comic books published by DC Comics. The character was created by writer Bill Finger, and artists Lew Sayre Schwartz and Win Mortimer.

=== Joker ===
An early origin story of the Joker as the original Red Hood was first seen in Detective Comics #168 (February 1951) in the story "The Man Behind the Red Hood!" where he was an unnamed criminal wearing a red dome-shaped hood who is disfigured by chemicals and goes insane.

=== Jason Todd ===
Jason Todd was first seen as the second Red Hood in Batman #635 (February 2005), a violent antihero in the main DC continuity where he's ultimately the leader of a group of vigilantes.

=== Harleen Quinzel ===
Alternate universe counterparts of Harleen Quinzel use the Red Hood identity in a more heroic fashion.

=== Other individuals named Red Hood ===
The New 52 features additional versions of Red Hood who are connected to the Red Hood Gang.

William "Liam" Distal was the Red Hood Gang's original leader during a period of time in which the young Bruce Wayne returned to Gotham City to start a crime-fighting career with the Red Hood Gang as an early infiltration target. The "Zero Year" event's first story arc "Secret City" revealed Distal has expanded the Red Hood Gang's ranks by blackmailing innocent Gotham citizens (such as Philip Kane) into joining the group as henchmen and his inspiration is nihilism, however, he's killed at some point by the Joker who impersonated him for his position as Red Hood One.

Commissioner Matthew McLeod is the Red Hood Gang's leader of corrupt Gotham police officers with Manny Gabris as a second in command before the two are exposed by James Gordon and Batman so McLeod tries to be a wannabe leader who gathers the Red Hood Gang's remnants, but he is killed by Talia al Ghul.

=== Red Hood in other media ===
==== Television ====
- A heroic, alternate reality version of the Joker / Red Hood appears in the Batman: The Brave and the Bold episode "Deep Cover for Batman!", voiced by Jeff Bennett.
- The Jason Todd incarnation of the Red Hood appears Young Justice, voiced by Josh Keaton.
- The Jason Todd incarnation of the Red Hood appears in Titans, portrayed by Curran Walters.
- The Jason Todd incarnation of the Red Hood makes a cameo appearance in the Harley Quinn episode "Gotham's Hottest Hotties".

==== Film ====
- The Jason Todd and Joker incarnations of the Red Hood appear in Batman: Under the Red Hood, voiced by Jensen Ackles and John DiMaggio respectively.
- A statue of an unidentified incarnation of the Red Hood appears in Justice League: The Flashpoint Paradox.
- The Joker incarnation of the Red Hood appears in Batman: The Killing Joke, voiced by Mark Hamill.
- An unidentified incarnation of the Red Hood makes a non-speaking appearance in The Lego Batman Movie as one of many villains enlisted by the Joker to attack Gotham City.
- The Jason Todd incarnation of the Red Hood appears in Batman Ninja, voiced by Akira Ishida in the Japanese version and by Yuri Lowenthal in the English dub.
- The Jason Todd incarnation of the Red Hood appears in Lego DC Batman: Family Matters, voiced by Jason Spisak.
- The Jason Todd incarnation of the Red Hood appears in Batman: Death in the Family, voiced by Vincent Martella.
- The Batman Ninja incarnation of Jason Todd / Red Hood appears in Batman Ninja vs. Yakuza League, voiced again by Akira Ishida in the Japanese version and by David Matranga in the English dub.

==== Video games ====
- The Jason Todd incarnation of the Red Hood appears as a playable character in the Nintendo 3DS and PlayStation Vita versions of Lego Batman 2: DC Super Heroes.
- The Joker incarnation of the Red Hood appears as a DLC skin for the Joker in Injustice: Gods Among Us.
- The Joker incarnation of the Red Hood appears in Batman: Arkham Origins.
- The Jason Todd incarnation of the Red Hood appears as a playable character in Lego Batman 3: Beyond Gotham, voiced by Troy Baker.
- The Jason Todd incarnation of the Red Hood appears in Batman: Arkham Knight, voiced again by Troy Baker.
- The Jason Todd incarnation of the Red Hood appears as a playable DLC character in Injustice 2, voiced by Cameron Bowen.
- The Jason Todd incarnation of the Red Hood appears as a playable character in Lego DC Super-Villains, voiced again by Cameron Bowen.
- The Jason Todd incarnation of the Red Hood appears as a playable character in Gotham Knights, voiced by Stephen Oyoung.
- The Jason Todd incarnation of the Red Hood appears as a playable character in DC: Dark Legion.
- The Jason Todd incarnation of the Red Hood appears as a playable character in DC: Worlds Collide.
- The Jason Todd incarnation of the Red Hood appears as a playable character in DC: Heroes and Villains.
- The Joker incarnation of the Red Hood appears as a playable character in Lego Batman: Legacy of the Dark Knight, voiced by Ewan Bailey.

==== Miscellaneous ====
- The Red Hood appears in The Batman Adventures #8.
- An original incarnation of the Red Hood, Professor Anders Overbeck, appears in Batman '66.
- The Jason Todd incarnation of the Red Hood appears in Batman: The Adventures Continue.
- The Jason Todd incarnation of the Red Hood appears in the Webtoon webcomic Batman: Wayne Family Adventures.

== Red Jack ==
Red Jack is a character appearing in American comic books published by DC Comics. The character was created by Grant Morrison and Richard Case, and first appeared in Doom Patrol vol. 2 #23 (June 1989).

=== Entity ===
Red Jack is a malevolent entity who sports a filigree crown, a masquerade-style mask, and a mid 17th century nobleman costume. He claims to have been Jack the Ripper as well as creator of the universe. His powers derived from the collective suffering of millions of butterflies, which he kept pinned to the wall of his home. He kidnapped Rhea Jones (Lodestone) to make as his bride. Red Jack seemed unstoppable against the Doom Patrol until Crazy Jane releases his butterfly collection which rendered him powerless, allowing his captive to stab him with his own knife.

=== Jacob Packer ===
A similar character, Jacob Packer, was created by Brian Augustyn and Mike Mignola for the Gotham by Gaslight storyline. He had been trained in both medicine and law by Thomas Wayne while Martha Wayne rejected him, resulting in him hiring an assassin to kill the two. Afterwards, Packer personally killed women to "silence" his own insanity as Jack the Ripper, framed Bruce Wayne for his killings, and acted as a defense attorney. Bruce was imprisoned in Arkham Asylum before figuring out the killer's identity and escaped with Alfred Pennyworth's help. Batman confronted Jack the Ripper, with Jack being killed by Inspector James Gordon.

=== Red Jack in other media ===
- Red Jack appears in the Doom Patrol episode "Pain Patrol", portrayed by Roger Floyd.
- Jacob Packer makes a non-speaking appearance in Batman: Gotham by Gaslight while the Jack the Ripper identity is amalgamated with James Gordon (voiced by Scott Patterson).

== Red Lantern ==
Red Lantern is the name of two characters appearing in American comic books published by DC Comics.

=== Vladimir Sokov ===
Vladimir Sokov is a Russian soldier who wields an artificial red lantern and ring that harnesses the Crimson Flame. While under cover as an American navy officer named Johnny Ladd, he had a romantic relationship with Alan Scott, the future Green Lantern, before seemingly being lost to a supernatural phenomenon known as the Crimson Flame; Alan takes the double-barrel name Alan Ladd Scott in his memory of his first love. Later, it is revealed he was on board Alan's naval ship as a Russian spy, with the intention of harnessing the power of the Crimson Flame for the Soviet Union as the supervillain Red Lantern.Though he had fought his former lover Green Lantern on occasion, they have a mutual enemy in the Nazis, who threaten both their countries. After scientists kidnap his daughter Ruby and attempt to experiment on her, Vladimir attacks their base and is presumed dead.

At the end of Flashpoint Beyond, Red Lantern is among the 13 missing Golden Age superheroes who the Time Masters captured to save them from Doctor Manhattan's alterations to the timeline. When the pods holding them stop working, they are transported to their own time, with history rewriting around them.

In another flashback, Vladimir is revealed to have survived and learns to use the Flame without his ring.

=== Ruby Sokov ===
Ruby Sokov is Red Lantern's daughter and a member of the Justice Society of America who inherited his powers and gained red skin as a side effect. While looking for her father, Ruby encounters Alan Scott and was brought to the United States of America to meet Huntress. Ruby later joined the Justice Society of America and assisted them in fighting an army of zombies summoned by Gentleman Ghost.

In the series JSA, Ruby appears as a member of Scandal Savage's Injustice Society. When Shadow Thief locates Hawkman's secret museum, Red Lantern helps the Society break in and steal the Spear of Destiny.

== Red Panzer ==
Red Panzer is the name of several characters appearing in American comic books published by DC Comics.

=== Helmut Streicher ===
Helmut Streicher is a scientist working for the Nazi High Command. In 1943, Helmut was sent by the Nazi High Command to build espionage tools for the Nazis that are secretly operating in Washington DC. Having invented a time scanner that told him about the Nazi's defeat at Normandy, Helmut designed himself a battle suit and took on the identity of Red Panzer in an attempt to prevent the inevitable. Using a time ship, he tried to go to the future only to end up on Earth-One where he encountered Wonder Woman. After a fight with her, Red Panzer and Wonder Woman ended up back on Earth-Two. With help from her Earth-Two counterpart, they managed to defeat Red Panzer.

=== Second version ===
The second Red Panzer is an unnamed Neo-Nazi who had plans for white supremacy. He fought Donna Troy and was killed in battle.

=== Third version ===
The third Red Panzer is an unnamed Neo-Nazi who is the son of the second Red Panzer and sought to avenge him.

Red Panzer later appeared as a member of Tartarus. He was killed by Damien Darhk.

=== Justin ===
The fourth Red Panzer is a man named Justin who succeeded the third Red Panzer and was offered this position by Vandal Savage.

During the "Infinite Crisis" storyline, Red Panzer appears as a member of Alexander Luthor Jr.'s Secret Society of Super Villains.

== Red Tool ==
Wayne Wilkins, a.k.a. Red Tool, first appeared in Harley Quinn (vol. 2) #3 (April 2014). A parody of Wade Wilson / Deadpool, he is a vigilante who is obsessed with Harley Quinn, to the point of stalking and kidnapping her. However, they have since become friends and allies.

=== Powers and abilities of Red Tool ===
Red Tool does not feel pain after a surgery that removed a brain tumor and parts of his amygdala. He uses tools and hardware appliances for weapons and has a bionic arm.

== Red Torpedo ==
Red Torpedo is the name of two characters appearing in DC Comics. The original is a superhero named Jim Lockhart, who was originally owned by Quality Comics and later purchased by DC Comics; while the second is an android created by T. O. Morrow. Jim Lockhart debuted in Crack Comics #1 (May 1940).

=== Jim Lockhart ===
Jim Lockhart is a navy captain until he retires in 1940. Unable to settle down, he builds a one-man submarine known as the Red Torpedo and becomes a self-proclaimed peacekeeper of the seas. His run as a hero for Quality Comics consisted of Crack Comics 1–20. His most common enemy was the Black Shark, a pirate in scuba gear. Lockhart discovers the Atlantean city of Merezonia and falls in love with its ruler, his former nemesis Queen Klitra.

Hours before the attack on Pearl Harbor, Red Torpedo is recruited by Uncle Sam to join the Freedom Fighters in defending the base. However, he is overwhelmed and left for dead. Lockhart survives, but chooses to retire.

Red Torpedo is seen aiding the Starman of 1951 in building his spaceship, the Flying Star. He later appears in Aquaman: Sword of Atlantis as the administrator of the Windward Home, a mobile seafaring city.

=== Android ===
A new female android Red Torpedo debuted in the second volume of Red Tornado #1 (2009). This Red Torpedo is the first elemental android created by T. O. Morrow during the days of the Soviet Union, years before the conception of Red Tornado. Much like Red Tornado, Torpedo rebelled against Morrow's control, leading him to deactivate her and hide her inside the sunken wreck of a battleship in the waters of Pearl Harbor. Torpedo spent years inside the ship before sending a beacon to Tornado and her two other "siblings", Red Volcano and Red Inferno. She is eventually found and reactivated by Tornado, and while she readjusts to the world, she informs Tornado about the existence of the other two elementals.

=== Red Torpedo in other media ===
An amalgamated incarnation of Red Torpedo appears in the Young Justice episode "Humanity", voiced by Jeff Bennett. This version is a male hydrokinetic android that used the alias of "Jim Lockhart" and was created by T. O. Morrow to infiltrate the Justice League sometime prior to the series, though its programming failed. In the present, Morrow reprograms Red Torpedo and sends him and Red Inferno to capture Red Tornado. However, Red Tornado convinces his fellow androids to stop Red Volcano from causing the Yellowstone Caldera to erupt, during which they are killed.

== Reign ==
- First appearance: Supergirl (vol. 6) #5 (March 2012)
- Created by: Michael Green, Mike Johnson and Mahmud Asrar
- Aliases: Worldkiller

Reign is a Worldkiller, a genetically engineered Kryptonian supersoldier created by Zor-El, and an enemy of Supergirl. She possesses superhuman physical abilities and is an adept swordswoman and hand-to-hand combatant.

Reign and four other Worldkillers survived Krypton's destruction, but her origin remained a mystery even to her. All she knew about herself is her name and her being a Worldkiller, and Krypton and Earth hold the answers to her origin. She battles Supergirl in an attempt to learn her past before being defeated and forced to retreat.

=== Reign in other media ===
- Reign appears in Supergirl, portrayed by Odette Annable. This version was created by a group of Kryptonians called the Worldkiller Coven during Krypton's final days before they sent her off-world. Reign eventually landed on Earth, was adopted by a woman named Patricia, named Samantha "Sam" Arias, and became a single mother to Ruby who lives in National City. Initially unaware of her true nature, Sam eventually learns of the pod she arrived in from Patricia. Following a signal sent out by the pod, Sam discovers the hidden Fortress of Sanctuary, where a holographic projection of her creator Selena tasks her with purifying Earth and transforming it into a new Krypton. Reign gradually emerges as a separate personality and becomes a masked vigilante to carry out Selena's will, though Sam retains no memory of her actions. Reign's subsequent rampage brings her into conflict with Supergirl, who uses black Kryptonite to save Sam and seemingly kill Reign. While the Worldkiller Coven resurrect the latter as a separate being, Reign is ultimately weakened by Sam with water from the Fountain of Lilith and taken away by Kryptonian demons.
  - Additionally, two alternate universe versions of Reign appear in the episode "It's a Super Life", both also portrayed by Annable.
- Reign appears as a playable character in Lego DC Super-Villains.

== Alberto Reyes ==
Alberto "Ernesto" Reyes first appeared in Blue Beetle (vol. 7) #1 (May 2006) and was created by Keith Giffen, John Rogers, and Cully Hamner.

Alberto Reyes is the father of Jaime Reyes (the third Blue Beetle). He is a mechanic living in El Paso, Texas who owns his own garage, a former soldier in the U.S. Army, and the husband of Bianca Reyes and the father of Milagro Reyes.

=== Alberto Reyes in other media ===
- Alberto Reyes appears in Teen Titans: The Judas Contract, voiced by David Zayas.
- Alberto Reyes appears in Blue Beetle (2023), portrayed by Damián Alcázar. During Victoria Kord's raid on the Reyes family's home, Alberto dies from cardiac arrest.

== Bianca Reyes ==
Bianca Reyes first appeared in Blue Beetle (vol. 7) #1 (May 2006) and was created by Keith Giffen, John Rogers, and Cully Hamner.

Bianca Reyes is the mother of Jaime Reyes (the third Blue Beetle). She is a paramedic living in El Paso, Texas, the wife of Alberto Reyes and the mother of Milagro Reyes.

=== Bianca Reyes in other media ===
- Bianca Reyes appears in Teen Titans: The Judas Contract, voiced by Maria Canals-Barrera.
- A character based on Bianca Reyes named Rocio Reyes appears in Blue Beetle (2023), portrayed by Elpidia Carrillo.

== Milagro Reyes ==
Milagro Reyes first appeared in Blue Beetle (vol. 7) #1 (May 2006) and was created by Keith Giffen, John Rogers, and Cully Hamner.

Milagro is the younger sister of Jaime Reyes (the third Blue Beetle).

=== Milagro Reyes in other media ===
- Milagro Reyes appears in Teen Titans: The Judas Contract, voiced by Kari Wahlgren.
- Milagro Reyes appears in Blue Beetle (2023), portrayed by Belissa Escobedo.

== Rhetoric ==
The Rhetoric is a deeply political, systemic enemy of Batman. He positions himself as the ultimate "anti-Batman," presenting a philosophical challenge to the Dark Knight's crusade. He was created out of the "Building Bad" sweepstakes, a collaborative create-a-villain competition held by DC Comics for the game Lego Batman: Legacy of the Dark Knight, before making his first comic appearance in Detective Comics #1113 (September 2026).

== Rip Roar ==
Rip Roar is a character in DC Comics. He first appeared in Young Justice #2, and was created by Peter David and Todd Nauck.

Rip Roar is a New God from Apokolips who stole a Super-Cycle from New Genesis in the distant past and had it imprint on him, making it follow his commands. Rip Roar was later imprisoned on Earth before accidentally being freed by Young Justice in the present. During the ensuing battle, Robin convinces the Super-Cycle to reject Rip Roar. Devastated, Rip Roar freezes himself in rock.

=== Rip Roar in other media ===
- Rip Roar appears as a character summon in Scribblenauts Unmasked: A DC Comics Adventure.
- A loose interpretation of Rip Roar appears in the fifth season of Supergirl, portrayed by Nick Sagar. This version is Russell Rogers, a human medical researcher, an old friend of William Dey, and boyfriend of Andrea Rojas who was previously believed to have died several years prior, but was secretly captured by Leviathan and brainwashed into serving them. In the episode "Dangerous Liaisons", he is sent to steal a laser and a particle amplifier, only to be foiled by Supergirl and Martian Manhunter and taken into the Department of Extranormal Operations (DEO)'s custody. In "Confidence Women", Rojas discovers what happened and mounts two attempts to free Rogers, with the second succeeding after Lena Luthor gives her the Acrata Medallion. Upon their escape, Rojas intends to run away with Rogers, but he is killed by a Leviathan sniper.

== Ro-Bear ==
Ro-Bear is a character appearing in American comic books published by DC Comics. He first appeared in Jay Garrick: The Flash #2 as part of "The New Golden Age" storyline and was created by Jeremy Adams and Diego Olortegui.

Ro-Bear is a cyborg bear who was created by Doctor Elemental when he worked for the Nazi Party and the Injustice Society. The Justice Society of America first encountered Ro-Bear in 1941, when they raided Doctor Elemental's laboratory in Germany.

Many years later, Ro-Bear resurfaces and attacks Boom and Courtney Whitmore at a mall. Ro-Bear and a group of robots are sent to attack Pieter Cross' lair as a diversion for Doctor Elemental to capture Boom.

== Robotman ==
Robotman is the name of two characters appearing in America comic books published by DC Comics.

=== Robert Crane ===
Robotman (Robert Crane) is a Golden Age DC Comics superhero. He first appeared in Star Spangled Comics #7 (April 1942) and was created by Jerry Siegel and Leo Nowak. As his name suggests, Robotman is a cyborg; part robot and part human.

Robert Crane is a scientist whose brain is placed inside a robotic body after he is fatally shot by a criminal named Mason. He assumes the civilian identity of Paul Dennis and joins the All-Star Squadron, accompanied by the robotic dog Robbie. His stories are mostly lighthearted in nature, featuring whimsical situations and comic relief (usually provided by Robbie). Despite this, the story remains grounded in Robotman's struggle to adjust to his new existence. At one point, he reveals his identity in court and is declared legally human.

Robotman was revealed to have been one of several other heroes involved in the first meeting of the charter members of the Justice League of America prior to the official forming of the team, an event which was suppressed from the public record.

In The New 52 continuity reboot, Robert Crane is a scientist working for the Allied Forces during World War II and the creator of J.A.K.E.

== Isabel Rochev ==
Isabel Rochev is a character appearing in American comic books published by DC Comics.

Isabel Rochev is a former slave from a Siberian village who obsessively fell in love with Robert Queen, and overcame her status to eventually become the CEO of Queen Industries after his death, increasing her power and influence over Star City by using her private security forces as public peacekeeping soldiers. However, her obsession with Queen has led her to usurp Queen's wife's jewelry and plot to kill Oliver Queen by any means necessary.

=== Isabel Rochev in other media ===
Isabel Rochev appears in Arrow, portrayed by Summer Glau. This version is a senior executive at Stellmoor International and Robert Queen's former mistress who acquires half of Queen Consolidated. Having been trained by Slade Wilson and receiving his powers through a blood transfusion, she was finally killed by Nyssa al Ghul.

== Rock ==
Rock is a character appearing in American comic books published by DC Comics.

Micah Flint is an astronaut who volunteered to participate in a program of genetic engineering that was intended to modify human physiology and anatomy in such a way as to render humans fit to sustain stays in outer space without much sophisticated technology. As an effect of the experimentation, Flint's skin gradually transforms into a rock-like form. In later appearances, he attempts to take revenge on Lex Luthor and joins the Superman Revenge Squad and Injustice League Unlimited.

== Amy Rohrbach ==
Amy Rohrbach is a character appearing in American comic books published by DC Comics.

Amy Rohrbach is a police officer in Blüdhaven, who worked alongside rookie officer Dick Grayson.

=== Amy Rohrbach in other media ===
Amy Rohrbach appears in Titans, portrayed by Lindsey Gort. This version was a detective in the Detroit Police Department and Dick Grayson's partner who was tortured and killed by followers of Trigon for his whereabouts.

== Serling Roquette ==
Serling Roquette is a character appearing in American comic books published by DC Comics. She was created by Karl Kesel and Steve Rude and first appeared in Superboy (vol. 4) #56 (October 1998).

Serling Roquette is the head of the genetics division of Project Cadmus. During the Sins of Youth storyline, Klarion the Witch Boy transforms several members of the Justice League into children and the members of Young Justice into adults. Superboy resists the spell due to possessing a genetic anomaly that prevents him from aging beyond the age of sixteen, but is afflicted with genetic instability that threatens to kill him. Roquette modifies Superboy's cellular structure to save his life, which has the side effect of aging him into an adult.

=== Serling Roquette in other media ===
Serling Roquette appears in Young Justice, voiced by Tara Strong. This version is a roboticist based in Star City.

== Rose Psychic ==
Rose Psychic is a DC Comics heroine affiliated with the company's first superhero, Doctor Occult. She was created by Jerry Siegel and Joe Shuster and first appeared in More Fun Comics #19 (March 1937). Later stories reveal that she was a fellow student of the doctor during their tutelage in magic. Due to unknown circumstances, her body was fused with Occult's, giving him the ability to assume a female form modeled on hers. The process inadvertently trapped her soul in Hell, and Occult ultimately risked his life to help her find eternal rest.

== Betsy Ross ==
Betsy Ross is a character appearing in American comic books published by DC Comics.

In "The New Golden Age", Elizabeth Rose is a school girl and the best friend of Molly Preacher. After seeing Miss America in action saving their school, they took on the costumed identities of Betsy Ross and Molly Pitcher to help her against a saboteur named Moth. The two act as her sidekicks until the end of World War II, when they are kidnapped by the Time Masters before being rescued by Stargirl.

== Rough House ==
Rough House is a character appearing in American comic books published by DC Comics.

In the 1940s, Rough House is a member of Moxie Mannheim's Intergang branch before being arrested and dying in prison. In the present day, Mannheim has Dabney Donovan clone Mannheim and other gangsters into new bodies, with Rough House gaining superhuman strength.

In 52, Rough House and Noose visit Black Adam in Kahndaq on Intergang's behalf and give him Adrianna Tomaz as tribute. However, Adam kills Rough House after he proposes expanding Intergang's smuggling operation between Africa and the Middle East.

=== Rough House in other media ===
Rough House appears in My Adventures with Superman, voiced by Vincent Tong. This version is an Asian member of Intergang whose real name is Albert and whose super-strength is derived from Kryptonian gauntlets.

== Cullen Row ==
Cullen Row is a character appearing in American comic books published by DC Comics. He debuted during "The New 52" reboot.

Cullen Row is the gay brother of Harper Row. When his bullies attacked him and Harper managed to tase one of them, Cullen was saved by Batman.

=== Cullen Row in other media ===
- Cullen Row appears in Young Justice, voiced by Benjamin Diskin. This version initially lives with an abusive father until he and Harper are taken to child protective services by Miss Martian and adopted by Lucas Carr and Bethany Carr.
- Cullen Row appears in Gotham Knights, portrayed by Tyler DiChiara. This version is a trans man and a friend of Duela.
