= Professor Ivo =

Anthony Ivo
- Anthony Ivo as depicted in Justice League of America #258 (January 1987). Art by Luke McDonnell.

Publication information
- Publisher: DC Comics
- First appearance: The Brave and the Bold #30 (June 1960)
- Created by: Gardner Fox; Mike Sekowsky

In-story information
- Alter ego: Anthony Ivo
- Species: Metahuman
- Team affiliations: Secret Society of Super Villains; S.T.A.R. Labs; N.E.M.O.
- Partnerships: Amazo; T.O. Morrow
- Abilities: Genius-level intellect; Immortality

Anthony Ivo is a supervillain in American comic books published by DC Comics. He is a mad scientist who is the creator of the android villain Amazo and, along with villainous scientist T. O. Morrow, the co-creator of the android Tomorrow Woman. As a result of his thanatophobia, Ivo has used his own scientific discoveries to make himself nearly immortal and invulnerable, causing him to become monstrous in the process.

Anthony Ivo appears in the second season of the live-action Arrowverse series Arrow, portrayed by Dylan Neal.

== Publication history ==
Anthony Ivo first appeared in The Brave and the Bold #30 (June 1960), and was created by Gardner Fox and Mike Sekowsky.

== Fictional character biography ==
Anthony Ivo grows up with thanatophobia, a fear of death so strong that he even avoids his own mother's funeral. As he discovers a talent for science, avoiding death and becoming immortal became his life's obsession. Ivo studies cybernetics and genetics, and eventually engages in criminal acts to acquire the resources he needs to continue his strange experiments. He concludes he could create an "immortality elixir" by studying and experimenting on animal life known to have long lifespans, and decides he will become immortal and dominate the Earth. To act at his agent in criminal operations and conquest, Ivo creates Amazo, an android built with "absorption cell" technology (later compared to microscopic nanite technology) that enables him to mimic the abilities of superhumans he encounters. Amazo stalks the founding members of the Justice League (except for Superman and Batman), then uses their powers to steal long-lived animals and kidnap an elderly person. Ivo creates and ingests his immortality elixir. Ivo then attempts to permanently remove the superheroes' powers and memories, but the League defeats him and his android. Ivo is imprisoned and given a sentence of 500 years in case his immortality elixir was successful.

Years later, Ivo discovers his immortality causes disfigurement that makes his skin scaly and his face monstrous. He blames this on the Justice League and becomes mentally unstable, leading to further criminal actions and attacks on the League. To keep him company, Ivo builds android duplicates of himself that eventually lock him up, repulsed by his insanity. The android carries out Ivo's desire for revenge by attacking the newly reformed Justice League, killing new team member Vibe.

Later, Ivo builds a private island populated by robots and then discovers that his disfigurement is progressing, causing pain and increased immobility. Deciding he wishes to destroy himself but unable to do it directly, he creates Amazoids, versions of Amazo who can each steal one power. The androids take the powers of Red Star, Rebis, Valor, Power Girl, Starman, and Geo-Force, then turn their abilities on Ivo, but are unable to kill him. Ice of the Justice League sympathizes with Ivo and unknowingly cures him using Guy Gardner's power ring.

Ivo and Red Volcano on a mission for the Secret Society of Super Villains.

Despite his disfiguring experience, Ivo succumbs to his death phobia and once again creates an immortality elixir, drinking it and accepting that once again he suffers a monstrous disfigurement, though now of a different nature. Deciding to target the Justice League again, he teams up with fellow mad scientist villain T. O. Morrow and they develop a friendly rivalry, bickering and trying to impress each other while also clearly respecting each other and enjoying their collaboration. They construct the android Tomorrow Woman, designed to act as a superhero to infiltrate the League and eventually kill them with an electromagnetic pulse that can disrupt brain functions. To Ivo's annoyance and Morrow's surprise, Tomorrow Woman becomes a true hero and sacrifices herself to save the Justice League. Discovering her true nature, the team then tracks down and arrests both Ivo and Morrow as they share a toast.

The Secret Society of Super Villains later assigns Ivo to collect soil samples in Auschwitz, which will be used to create the villain Genocide. Ivo does not care to create the villain, but agrees to do so in hopes that the Society's resources can cure his disfigurement.

=== The New 52 ===
In 2011, The New 52 rebooted the DC Comics universe. During the New 52 origin of the Justice League, Ivo appeared as a former biology professor at Ivy University before becoming director of the Red Room, a S.T.A.R. Labs project that collects and analyzes technology. Ivo pioneers the "organic pattern process", technology that mimics organic life down to a cellular level, which leads to the creation of the A-Maze Operating System. A parallel support program based on Ivo's design, the B-Maze Operating System, is built without Ivo's knowledge. It has showed results comparable to those of A-Maze OS. The same files note that Ivo is unpredictable, disappearing for days at a time and often consumed by personal projects not authorized or approved by S.T.A.R. Labs. Ivo's thanatophobia manifests in panic attacks and drug use, and leads to several confrontations with Ivo's fellow team members.

Year later, Amazo fights and is defeated by the Justice League, apparently the result of further development of the A-Maze OS. Ivo fakes his death, then teams up with a mysterious villain known as the Outsider to establish a new Secret Society of Super Villains. It is also revealed that he created a version of Shaggy Man.

In Dark Nights: Metal, Ivo appears as a member of the Science Squad during Barbatos' invasion.

== Powers and abilities ==
Anthony Ivo is a criminal mastermind and a scientific genius, skilled in genetics, biology, programming, robotics, artificial intelligence, and engineering. According to JLA: Year One, he obtained some of his knowledge and expertise by studying the technology and biology of aliens and super-villains. He is responsible for the creation of various artificially intelligent androids including Amazo and, with help from T.O. Morrow, the Tomorrow Woman. Ivo has intense thanatophobia, with the one exception being a short time when he believed suicide was preferable to increasing pain and immobility.

As a result of his immortality elixir, Ivo's skin seems to be invulnerable to conventional weapons, fire, and most forms of energy attack. It is unknown if his aging is completely halted, but Ivo believes that his first elixir would extend his life for five hundred years and that he can consume more elixir when it wears off.

== Ivo's androids ==
The following androids were created by Anthony Ivo:

- Amazo - Android capable of mimicking physical abilities, superpowers, and creating copies of weapons.
- Amazoid - Androids similar to Amazo, but each can only duplicate the abilities of one superhuman.
- Composite Superman - In one version of Ivo's origin, his android Composite Superman is an early attempt to duplicate the Justice League's powers before later creating Amazo.
- Kid Amazo - The "Son" of Amazo, a techno-organic being created with Amazo technology and manipulation of human biology.
- Red Volcano - An android with great speed and heat-based abilities.
- Shaggy Man - In "The New 52", Shaggy Man is a robotic creation dressed in a hairy humanoid costume that Ivo created to strengthen Outsider's Secret Society of Super Villains.
- Tomorrow Woman - An artificial life-form with telekinetic powers, artificial respiration and pulse, and false memories of a human life; co-created by T.O. Morrow and originally designed to infiltrate and eventually destroy the Justice League.

== Other versions ==
An alternate version of Anthony Ivo appeared in the Elseworlds one-shot JLA: Island of Dr. Moreau. This version serves as the assistant of Dr. H.I. Moreau.

== In other media ==
=== Television ===
- Anthony Ivo appears in Young Justice, voiced by Peter MacNicol. This version is a member of the Light who is assisted by monkey-like robots dubbed M.O.N.Q.I.s (Mobile Optimal Neural Quotient Infiltrators) and an android duplicate who is serving time in Belle Reve in his place.
- Anthony Ivo appears in the "Vibe" segment of DC Nation Shorts, voiced by Jason Marsden.
- Anthony Ivo appears in flashbacks depicted in the second season of Arrow, portrayed by Dylan Neal. In his quest to find a sunken Japanese submarine containing the Mirakuru serum and save his wife Jessica from an unspecified, worsening illness, he employed the crew of the ship, the Amazo, traveled to the island of Lian Yu, and rescued Sara Lance from the sinking Queen's Gambit yacht. While on the island, Ivo encounters the stranded Oliver Queen and claimed that he intended to "save the human race" before forcing him to choose between whether Lance or Shado dies by his hand. After killing Shado and losing his right hand and the Amazo to a crazed Slade Wilson, Ivo begins to suffer from blood poisoning before being killed by Queen.
- Anthony Ivo appears in My Adventures with Superman, voiced by Jake Green. This version is the CEO of AmazoTech who is suspected of being involved in illegal activities, is served by Alex Luthor in the first season, and is wary of Superman's intentions. Additionally, he utilizes the energy-draining Parasite armor and temporarily joins Task Force X later in the season.

=== Film ===
- Anthony Ivo makes a cameo appearance in Justice League: War as a S.T.A.R. Labs scientist.
- Anthony Ivo appears in Justice League: Crisis on Infinite Earths, voiced by Ike Amadi.

=== Video games ===
- Anthony Ivo appears as a character summon in Scribblenauts Unmasked: A DC Comics Adventure.
- Anthony Ivo appears in a picture depicted in Lego DC Super-Villains.

=== Miscellaneous ===
- Anthony Ivo appears in DC Super Friends #1. This version intended to become famous via his robotics genius, but was overshadowed by the Super Friends.
- Anthony Ivo appears in Smallville Season 11 #10 as a S.T.A.R. Labs scientist.
- Anthony Ivo appears in the Injustice 2 prequel comic. After the League of Assassins kidnap his family, he builds Amazo for Ra's al Ghul. Upon learning from Jason Todd his family was murdered, Ivo retakes control of Amazo and allows the Justice League Task Force and Supergirl to destroy it. For his betrayal, Ivo is executed by Batman and Talia al Ghul's daughter, Athanasia al Ghul.
