= Tomorrow Woman =

- Tomorrow Woman, as she appeared in her debut on JLA #5 (May 1997) by Howard Porter

Publication information
- Publisher: DC Comics
- First appearance: JLA #5 (May 1997)
- Created by: Grant Morrison (writer); Howard Porter

In-story information
- Alter ego: Clara Kendall
- Team affiliations: Justice League
- Abilities: Telekinesis; Telepathy; Lethal EMP weapon

Tomorrow Woman is a character, an android in stories published in DC Comics. She debuted in JLA #5 (May 1997), and was created by Grant Morrison and Howard Porter. Within the DC Comics canon, she is created by the mad scientist super-villains Professor Ivo and T. O. Morrow. Given human-like physical characteristics and false memories of a human life, Tomorrow Woman believes herself to be a new superhero born with psionic abilities due to a "four-lobed brain". Her true purpose is to infiltrate and then kill the Justice League. In her first appearance, she says she exclusively has telekinetic abilities, but a later flashback issue of JLA: Tomorrow Woman (1998) reveals that she also has telepathic abilities.

In the weekly comic book series Trinity, a different version of Tomorrow Woman appeared, a woman named Clara Kendall from a parallel Earth.

== Fictional character biography ==
Professor Ivo and T. O. Morrow, both accomplished roboticists, decide to join forces and create a new android that will destroy the Justice League. After learning that the JLA is holding an membership drive, the two scientists decide to create an agent who will infiltrate the team and kill the team's members with a lethal electromagnetic pulse (EMP) that shuts down brain activity. While Ivo gives their creation artificial skin, musculature, organs, and other human characteristics, Morrow creates the android's mind, programming a personality capable of learning and adapting and false memories of a human life. The android, Tomorrow Woman, believes she is a human born with mutant abilities due to having a "four-lobed brain", a preview of how humanity may evolve in thousands of years. Ivo and Morrow program Tomorrow Woman to act and think as a hero, only activating the EMP weapon after she has gained the trust of the entire team.

At the membership drive, Tomorrow Woman is the last to arrive and impresses the Justice League with her formidable telekinetic powers as well as her kind, earnest, and altruistic nature. After passing their tests and fooling their equipment, as well as the telepathy of Martian Manhunter and the heightened senses of Superman, she is accepted into the team. For the next few weeks, Tomorrow Woman primarily helps the Justice League against a strange menace called IF, which is discovered to be a weapon from the future. The League realizes an electromagnetic pulse can deactivate IF and prevent it from causing more destruction. Tomorrow Woman's programming to kill the League activates, but she resists it, telling Green Lantern (Kyle Rayner) that she believes something inside her is bad, but that she will choose to act as a hero. She then sacrifices herself, using the EMP weapon to destroy IF and herself. While Ivo is furious at this development, Morrow reveals he deliberately made Tomorrow Woman's brain advanced enough to develop her own personality and ethics, and so her act of free will is a demonstration of his genius.

Tomorrow Woman's short time with the League was expanded on in the one-shot issue JLA: Tomorrow Woman (1998). This flashback story depicts Tomorrow Woman having telepathy as well as telekinesis and being aware of her true programming earlier. She is initially cynical in her attitude towards the team and finds their trust of her laughable. Her views change after she is emotionally affected by her experiences in saving children and then experiencing compassion rather than judgment from the League when she acts rashly or negatively. Initially asking to be allowed to kill the team sooner rather than continue to experience these new and confusing emotions, she later determines that if the time comes to attack the team she will find a way to save them instead and prove she is greater than her programming.

Tomorrow Woman made a third appearance in the Hourman series. The third Hourman, an android with time manipulation powers that last for an hour, is exploring the nature of artificial life and decides to revive Tomorrow Woman. They discuss his moral quandary but then Tomorrow Woman insists on using her last 50 minutes of borrowed time to help whoever she can. When the hour ends, Tomorrow Woman vanishes.

=== Trinity ===
In the series Trinity, time and space are disrupted, creating unstable alternate timelines. Issues #21–23 depict an Earth of an alternate timeline defended by the Justice Society International, a version of the Justice Society. Just as the Justice League includes Superman, Batman, and Wonder Woman as a "trinity" of heroes, the Society has its own trinity: Black Adam, Green Arrow, and Tomorrow Woman. After helping to restore reality and nearly sacrificing herself in the process, her timeline is restored. In the stabilized version of her timeline, Clara discovers she is a biological human rather than an android.

=== Absolute Power ===
Tomorrow Woman is reintroduced following The New 52 continuity reboot and the DC Rebirth relaunch, which rewrote the history of the DC Comics universe. Her original creation and sacrifice remains intact. Following her destruction, Anthony Ivo recovers Tomorrow Woman's remains and attempts to rebuild her. However, Green Arrow and his allies attack Ivo, forcing Tomorrow Woman to defend him in an incomplete state.

== Powers and abilities ==
Tomorrow Woman is an artificial life-form, an android with artificial skin and organs who possesses telepathic and telekinetic powers. She is programmed with false memories of a cover identity and so seems to initially believe that her powers are due to her being a mutant.

Her telepathy allows her to read minds and project her thoughts. Her telepathy is focused enough to be able to forcibly free people from being mind-controlled by others without harming them in the process. She sometimes has trouble filtering out heightened emotions of people around her or even people she can perceive on television. Her telepathic defenses were strong and subtle enough that even when she became aware of her lethal programming, she was able to hide her true purpose from Martian Manhunter and Aquaman during a telepathic link. Her telekinetic blasts can stun a person without damaging them or increase in power so as to shatter steel and concrete. She can fly through telekinetic manipulation. The android Tomorrow Woman's secret weapon was an electromagnetic pulse device that could disrupt human brain activity, killing anyone within its blast radius.
