= Genocide (comics) =

- Genocide standing behind a defeated Wonder Woman as seen on the cover to Wonder Woman vol. 3 #26.

Publication information
- Publisher: DC Comics
- First appearance: Initial creation: DC Universe #0 (June 2008); Final creation: Wonder Woman (vol. 3) #26 (January 2009)
- Created by: Gail Simone (writer); Aaron Lopresti (artist)

In-story information
- Species: Golem
- Team affiliations: Secret Society of Super Villains
- Abilities: Super-strength; Enhanced durability Super-speed; Teleportation; Healing factor

Genocide is a supervillain appearing in American comic books published by DC Comics. Genocide is a golem superweapon created by the Secret Society of Super Villains to fight Wonder Woman from the stolen corpse of a Wonder Woman from a possible future, soil samples from locations where acts of genocide occurred, and a combination of magic and science.

== Publication history ==
Genocide first appeared in Wonder Woman vol. 3 #26 and was created by Gail Simone.

== Fictional character biography ==
Genocide's creation as depicted in DC Universe #0 (June 2008).

At some point in the future, Ares steals the dead body of Wonder Woman. He comes back through time and manipulates Barbara Minerva and T. O. Morrow to gather a team of scientists to collect soil samples from sites of genocide - Auschwitz, Jasenovac, Darfur, Rwanda, and Cambodia. The scientists, with the help of Felix Faust, use the soil to empower the corpse of Wonder Woman with evil energy, creating Genocide. Morrow believes that Genocide is too unstable to be let loose and begs Minerva to terminate the project, but is ignored.

Minerva initially sends Genocide to attack a shopping mall in Washington, D.C. and draw the Justice League's attention. Wonder Woman investigates the attack, only to be severely beaten by Genocide, who steals the Lasso of Truth. After having the lasso surgically grafted to her body by the Crime Doctor, Genocide is sent to the base of the Department of Metahuman Affairs to retrieve the captive Doctor Psycho. Genocide is attacked by Justice League members Green Lantern, Firestorm, and Red Tornado, but quickly stops them. When Wonder Woman returns with reinforcements, Genocide uses the lasso to create an explosion of psychic energy that destroys the Department's headquarters, killing most people in the vicinity and leaving the survivors in an unstable emotional state. Before leaving, Genocide kidnaps Wonder Woman's friend Etta Candy. Genocide tortures Candy, ultimately leaving her comatose.

Athena reveals to Diana the truth behind Genocide and that Ares will use the creature as an instrument to destroy the gods and heroes unless Diana can stop him. Upon learning this, Diana attacks Genocide with renewed vigor, ripping the Lasso from Genocide's body and leaving her to drown in the ocean. Ares transfers Genocide's soul into a clay figure and gives the figure to the rogue Amazon warrior Alkyone, who is determined to destroy Diana. When Alkyone becomes the queen of Themyscira, she causes the spirit of Genocide to enter herself and three other Amazon allies by sacrificing the clay figure.

In the DC Rebirth relaunch, Genocide is depicted as a golem of unknown origin who was previously buried on the island of the Gargareans in the Tyrrhenian Sea. In the present, Paula von Gunther finds and revives Genocide, binding her to her will. With Gunther acting as Warmaster, Genocide helped to form the Four Horsemen with Devastation and the ogre Armageddon.

== Powers and abilities ==
The full extent of Genocide's abilities has yet to be revealed. Genocide has superhuman strength, durability and speed. She also has the ability to teleport. Genocide can project anger, fear, and despair to weaken her enemies. Using the Lasso of Truth, Genocide can generate psychic energy blasts that disrupt the minds of others.

== In other media ==
Genocide appears as a character summon in Scribblenauts Unmasked: A DC Comics Adventure.
