= Secret Society of Super Villains =

DC Comics supervillain group

- Lex Luthor's Secret Society of Super Villains as seen in Villains United: Infinite Crisis Special #1. Art by Karl Kerschl.

Publication information
- Publisher: DC Comics
- First appearance: Secret Society of Super Villains #1 (May–June 1976)
- Created by: Gerry Conway (writer); Pablo Marcos (artist)

In-story information
- Base(s): Gotham City
- Member(s): List of Secret Society of Super Villains members

Secret Society of Super Villains (SSoSV) is an American comic book published by DC Comics, created by writer Gerry Conway and artist Pablo Marcos, which first appeared in May–June 1976. The series' focuses on a titular group of supervillains, most of whom are foes of the members of the Justice League of America. The series was cancelled with issue #15 in July 1978, as part of the DC Implosion, a period when DC suddenly cancelled dozens of comics.

Following the cancellation of the original series, the fictional group has returned in many forms.

== Series conception ==
Editor Gerry Conway created the team to be "a kind of 'evil' Justice League", inspired by the "Rogues Gallery" that fellow editor Julie Schwartz created for the Flash. Since other editors were somewhat possessive towards the more popular DC Comics supervillains, Conway resorted to sifting through DC's back issues in search of members, finally selecting a lineup of obscure or forgotten villains. Conway said: "Obviously, this was lifted from Dick Tracy, but having costumed villains with a shared goal — even if it was simply the destruction of their common enemy — seems to be something that was unique to DC".

The first issue of Secret Society of Super Villains was drafted with artwork by Pablo Marcos. Then, according to Conway's assistant Paul Levitz:

Custom in those years was for the editor to bring the finished inks of an issue in to [editorial director] Carmine [Infantino] for a cover conference, during which Carmine would usually sketch a cover design in pen on typing paper. While I wasn't in the room, I clearly recall Gerry coming back down the hall to his office, confused, as Carmine had looked through the issue wanting to see the villains' clubhouse or headquarters, and when that wasn't in the book, asking Gerry to redo it. In my time at DC in Carmine's years, this was the most significant change in an issue I recall his asking for at that late stage.

In the original story, Darkseid (demanding to be called the Director) founds the group under the title of the Brotherhood of Crime in a bid to hold the world to ransom by stealing deadly nerve gas. The group, made up of Captain Cold, Gorilla Grodd, Clayface, Star Sapphire, and a clone of Manhunter, turns on their benefactor when Manhunter raises the issue of Darkseid's history of trying to enslave humanity. Darkseid is revealed to be an android. Manhunter suspects Darkseid controls it from afar and suggests forming the Secret Society of Super Villains to combat Darkseid while pursuing their own goals.

In the revised first issue, the team's lineup included Captain Cold, Gorilla Grodd, Star Sapphire and Manhunter from the original conception, and added Mirror Master, Copperhead, Sinestro, Shadow Thief and the Wizard.

Starting from the second issue, the comic's recurring hero is Captain Comet. Conway said that he wanted a regular 'lead hero' for the villains to interact with. The inclusion of a regular hero in the book helped to avoid Comics Code Authority concerns about presenting villains in a positive light.

== Publication history ==
Due to the delays caused by having to redo the first issue from scratch, Conway assigned David Anthony Kraft to script the next three issues of Secret Society of Super Villains over his plots. After issue #4, both Conway and Kraft abruptly left DC, leading to a mad scramble to produce a fill-in issue.

Jack C. Harris took over as editor, and Conway returned as writer only with issue #8, but artists on the series rotated nearly as often as the lineup of the titular supergroup, with Rich Buckler, Mike Vosburg, and Dick Ayers all contributing short stints as pencilers, while inkers changed from issue to issue. Harris felt that the series' mediocre sales might have been partly his fault: "The cover concepts were one of my editorial duties. Rich Buckler turned my ideas into the best he could do, but I never felt as if my ideas were good enough for his art. I think there was a 'sameness' to my ideas which might have hurt the title in that casual readers might have missed buying an issue because they thought they'd already seen it".

Secret Society of Super Villains was cancelled with issue #15 as part of the DC Implosion. Issue #16 was already at the printer at the time of the cancellation and would have been the final issue, but writer Bob Rozakis appealed to DC to pull the issue since it was the beginning of a three-part story and he did not want to leave the readers hanging. Issue #17 was near completion at the time, and both it and issue #16 would see publication (of a sort) in the privately printed Cancelled Comics Cavalcade #2. Issue #18, which concluded the three-part story, was scripted but never drawn. Rozakis later revealed where the story would have gone had the series not been cancelled in a weekly column for Silver Bullet Comics.

This series, along with the unpublished issues #16 and 17, were collected in a two-volume hardcover edition, with the volumes published in 2011 and 2012, respectively.

== Fictional team history ==
=== Darkseid's Society ===
Cover to Secret Society of Super Villains #3, art by Ernie Chan.

First organized by Darkseid, the Secret Society of Super Villains were based in the Sinister Citadel in San Francisco. From early on, the team was plagued with power struggles. Lex Luthor, Wizard, Gorilla Grodd, and Funky Flashman all sought to control the powerful team; Manhunter (the team's first leader) and Captain Comet sought to divert the villains' evil ways into a more positive channel. After discovering the true identity of their benefactor, the team rebelled against the alien overlord. To quash their uprising, Darkseid sent Mantis and Kalibak. At the end of the struggle, Manhunter sacrificed himself to seemingly kill Darkseid. After this, the team splintered, with Luthor, Wizard, Gorilla Grodd, and Flashman leading the team at different times. However, Wizard proved to be the most tenacious and created the definitive incarnation of the SSoSV. They went on to fight the original Crime Syndicate of America of Earth-Three and the Justice Society of America. While traveling between dimensions, back on Earth-1 the Silver Ghost, Mirror Master and Copperhead formed yet another team and fought the Freedom Fighters.

Wizard's group eventually returned from Earth-2 and battled against the Justice League of America aboard their satellite headquarters. At one point in the battle, the two teams swapped bodies, allowing the supervillains to discover the true identities of their enemies. After gaining the upper hand, the Justice League wiped the memories of the supervillains, precipitating Identity Crisis and the formation of the current Society years later.

=== Ultra-Humanite's Society ===
The Secret Society on the cover to Justice League of America #195, art by George Pérez.

The next incarnation of the Secret Society appeared in 1981, headquartered in a new Sinister Citadel in Nepal, and was created by Ultra-Humanite, who organized foes of both Earth-One's Justice League and Earth-Two's Justice Society. This version of the Society consisted of Ultra-Humanite, Brain Wave, Killer Frost, Cheetah, Signalman, Floronic Man, Monocle, Rag Doll, Mist, and Psycho-Pirate, and marked the first appearance of Ultra-Humanite's albino gorilla body. After capturing and sending ten heroes of the JSA and JLA to Limbo, the Society is betrayed by Ultra-Humanite, who had his own agenda. In response, the betrayed villains of Earth-1 free the heroes and attack Ultra-Humanite. The entire Secret Society of Super-Villains is incarcerated in Limbo by the JLA and JSA.

=== Underground ===
After the reformation of the JLA, Martian Manhunter lures a group of villains to one spot by disguising himself as the late Brain Wave and assembling a new version of the Secret Society of Super Villains. When the villains leave their meeting place, they are confronted and defeated by the Justice League. The Justice League members find Blockbuster knocked out next to Martian Manhunter.

=== Alexander Luthor Jr.'s Society ===
After the defeat of the last incarnation of the SSoSV, a great amount of time would pass before villains would band together in any sort of large organization. Fueled by rumors of the mindwiping of Doctor Light, a new Society emerged. This Society was founded by Alexander Luthor Jr. posing as Lex Luthor, along with Calculator, Doctor Psycho, Deathstroke, Talia al Ghul, and Black Adam.

The Society's council, cover to Villains United #1 by J. G. Jones

Alexander Luthor Jr.'s intent was to gather together a cadre of supervillains to retrieve several key superheroes who have ties to the multiverse to harness their residual temporal vibrations to recreate the multiverse. Only Psycho-Pirate, who remembered the multiverse, knew of this plan, as Alexander Luthor Jr. lied to the members of his inner circle, telling them that he was building a massive mind-erasing machine.

The group, referred to simply as the Society, was featured in the miniseries Villains United as background characters and foils for the new Secret Six (consisting of six villains recruited by the real Lex Luthor, who refused to join the Society). The follow-up one-shot issue Villains United: Infinite Crisis Special #1 focused on the Society as they enacted Alexander Luthor Jr.'s back-up plan to conquer Earth in the event that his main plan failed.

At the end of Infinite Crisis, Alexander Luthor Jr. is killed by the Joker. Black Adam, betrayed by Alexander Luthor Jr., returns to Khandaq to rule full-time.

=== "Final Crisis" ===
Not long after the Society's dissolution, Checkmate instigated a crackdown on all villains in the DC Universe, who were captured and exiled to a prison planet as seen in the Salvation Run miniseries. After the surviving villains return to Earth, their desire for revenge drives the Society to depose Lex Luthor and replace him with Libra.

Libra, a follower of Intergang's "Religion of Crime" and a secret agent of Darkseid, leads the Secret Society in their role as Darkseid's ground troops as part of the Final Crisis storyline. Promising to fulfill the hearts desires of his subordinates, Libra murders Martian Manhunter. He also arranges for Clayface to cause an explosion at the Daily Planet, killing and maiming dozens of Superman's closest friends and mortally wounding Lois Lane, to try to seduce the disgruntled Luthor to his side and draw Superman to Libra.

With most of the Society, including Vandal Savage, behind him, Libra reveals his true self to Lex Luthor as the villain turns on the Human Flame by forcing a mind-control helmet onto his face, exposing him to the Anti-Life Equation and turning him into a mindless warrior known as a Justifier. Faced with the threat of becoming a Justifier himself, Luthor agrees to become Libra and Darkseid's servant. With help from Doctor Sivana and Calculator, Luthor turns against Libra and forces him to retreat.

In Final Crisis: Rogues' Revenge, the Rogues withdraw from Libra's Society and plot to take revenge on Inertia before they retire. However, Libra uses his New Rogues to target the Rogues and forces them to join up with Libra by doing various things to those close to them. Even with the New Rogues killed by the Rogues, Libra does not give up easily. They still turn down Libra even after Zoom is de-powered by Inertia, who is killed by the Rogues.

During and after Final Crisis, Cheetah assigns several scientific members of a new Secret Society (such as Professor Ivo and Doctor Poison) to collect soil samples from various regions of Earth in which acts of genocide occurred. They use the soil to form a new villain named Genocide.

=== The New 52 ===
The Secret Society of Super Villains appears in DC's 2011 The New 52 continuity reboot, consisting of Professor Ivo, Outsider, Scarecrow, Blockbuster, Signalman, Copperhead, and Plastique.

=== DC Rebirth ===
The Society reappears in DC's 2016 reboot, DC Rebirth, consisting of Vandal Savage, Hector Hammond, the Riddler, Professor Zoom, Black Manta, Ultra-Humanite, Deadline, Raptor, and Killer Frost, with Lex Luthor being established as a former member. They place Deathstroke on trial while debating whether he is truly reformed or not; however, the Riddler proves via Hammond's telepathic abilities that Deathstroke is 'evil'.

During the "Dark Crisis" storyline, Deathstroke leads an incarnation of the Secret Society of Super Villains. After mourning the apparent deaths of the Justice League, the Society attack Titans Academy until they are repelled by Jon Kent. The Great Darkness later corrupts the Society's members into serving it.

== Other versions ==
=== Justice Underground ===
Justice Underground

Publication information
- Publisher: DC Comics
- First appearance: JLA Secret Files and Origins 2004
- Created by: Kurt Busiek; Ron Garney

In-story information
- Base(s): Undisclosed location in the nation of Modora (on an alternate Earth)
- Member(s): Quizmaster; Sir Solomon Grundy; Lady Sonar; General Grodd; Q-Ranger; Star Sapphire

The Justice Underground is a fictional superhero team in the DC Multiverse. The Justice Underground is an alternative version of the Secret Society of Super Villains from the Anti-Matter Universe.

The Underground experienced some temporary victories in their battles with the Syndicate, both as a team and individually. For example, the Quizmaster's underground connections allowed him to interfere with the supplies needed by the Crime Syndicate for various operations, such as the speed serum that Johnny Quick requires to maintain his super speed.

One by one, the Justice Underground members were all defeated, captured or killed. For example, Ultraman (counterpart of Superman) rendered Sir Solomon Grundy inert on a Saturday, and Lady Sonar sustained massive injuries from having her sonic abilities reflected back to her by Power Ring (counterpart of Green Lantern). Lady Sonar was forced to replace much of her shattered body with bionic implants. It was in this form that she resided as the guardian of Modora, the final free nation of the Anti-Matter Earth.

Upon her home's invasion, Lady Sonar was successful in defeating Johnny Quick (counterpart of Flash) by temporarily shifting his body out of phase with reality. She was eventually destroyed by Owlman (counterpart of Batman) and the rest of the Crime Syndicate when they finally conquered Modora. Lady Sonar was placed into cryogenic storage alongside her teammates, ready to be reanimated in a zombified state if the Syndicate decides it necessary. Their remains are located in the Crime Syndicate's Panopticon on the Moon's surface.

The Justice Underground was released by the Martian Manhunter as a team of associate JLA members reversed back into the matter universe.

==== Members ====
- Quizmaster (counterpart of Riddler) – Arthur Brown was a master quiz show host until he lost and turned to crime. The Quizmaster is the leader and the smartest man alive. He does not have any superpowers. His incredibly high IQ and knowledge of almost all disciplines enabled him to be as effective a fighter as any of his compatriots with superpowers. Quizmaster later adopted the alias of Enigma.
- Sir Solomon Grundy (counterpart of Solomon Grundy) – Cyrus Gold was a Gotham city merchant until he was killed in a swamp and became a hulking zombie. Grundy appears to be identical in physical appearance to Solomon Grundy with the exception of his mustache and goatee. In keeping with his educated personality, Grundy dresses himself as a 19th-century Englishman would and speaks accordingly.
- General Grodd (counterpart of Gorilla Grodd) – General Grodd is a renegade freedom fighter from a militaristic ape nation. Grodd is an extremely strong gorilla who has telekinesis and smarts to match his strength.
- Star Sapphire (counterpart of Star Sapphire) – This version of Star Sapphire is a knight-errant from the other side of the galaxy. Star Sapphire is a Violet Lantern (powered by love) and will do anything for it.
- Lady Sonar (counterpart of Sonar) – Lady Sonar is a female version of Sonar.
- Q Ranger (counterpart of Major Force) – The "quantum-powered dynamo".

== Collected editions ==
The original comic book series was scheduled to be collected into a trade paperback entitled Showcase Presents The Secret Society of Super Villains (collects SSoSV #1–17, 520 pages, ISBN 978-1-4012-1587-3), but that project was cancelled. Instead, it was collected into two hardcover volumes. They are:

- The Secret Society of Super Villains Volume 1 (collects SSoSV #1–10), August 2011, ISBN 1-4012-3109-8.
- The Secret Society of Super Villains Volume 2 (collects SSoSV #11–15, DC Special #27, DC Special Series #6, Super-Team Family #13–14, Justice League of America #166–168 and the unpublished SSoSV #16–17 from Cancelled Comics Cavalcade #2), March 2012, ISBN 978-1401231101

== In other media ==
=== Television ===
- Two incarnations of the Secret Society appear in series set in the DC Animated Universe (DCAU):
  - The first version appears in a self-titled two-part episode of Justice League, consisting of Gorilla Grodd, Giganta, Killer Frost, Sinestro, Parasite, Shade, and Clayface. With Grodd taking measures to encourage the group to work more cohesively to avoid infighting, the Society defeat the Justice League in their first encounter. However, they are defeated in the subsequent rematch.
  - In the third season of Justice League Unlimited, Grodd rebuilds and expands the Secret Society to combat the expanded Justice League. With this incarnation of the Society, Grodd created a massive co-operative wherein he manages its members and they provide backup for each other in exchange for Grodd receiving a portion of all profits made. To keep the Society secret, all members have their brains shielded from telepathy and wired to short out if they are interrogated. After discovering Grodd intended to turn humanity into apes, Luthor ousts him and assumes leadership. In the two-part series finale "Alive!" and "Destroyer", Luthor travels into space in an attempt to resurrect Brainiac. Grodd leads a coup and retakes control, leading to a civil war until Luthor jettisons Grodd into space and Killer Frost freezes Grodd's loyalists. Tala resurrects Darkseid instead of Brainiac, with Darkseid destroying the Society's base and killing most of its members. However, Sinestro and Star Sapphire rescue Luthor, Atomic Skull, Bizarro, Cheetah, Evil Star, Giganta, Heat Wave, Killer Frost, Toyman, and Volcana.
- The Justice Underground appears in the Batman: The Brave and the Bold episode "Deep Cover for Batman!", led by Red Hood and consisting of unnamed heroic versions of Black Manta, Clock King, Doctor Polaris, Gentleman Ghost, Gorilla Grodd, Sinestro, Brain, and Kite Man.
- A group based on the Secret Society called The Light appears in Young Justice. The group was founded by Vandal Savage to counteract the Justice League's preserving of society's "calcified status quo", believing they directly inhibit mankind by protecting them from disaster, crime and tragedy — factors he believes are needed for humanity to evolve.

=== Film ===
The Justice Underground appears in Justice League: Crisis on Two Earths, consisting of a heroic Lex Luthor, the Jester, and the Jester's monkey sidekick Harley.

=== Video games ===
- The Secret Society appears in DC Universe Online, led by Lex Luthor, Circe, and the Joker and consisting of Catwoman, Deathstroke, Black Adam, Metallo, Harley Quinn, Giganta, and Poison Ivy.
- An alternate reality version of the "Society" appears in Injustice 2, led by Gorilla Grodd and consisting of Bane, Poison Ivy, Scarecrow, Deadshot, Cheetah, Captain Cold, and Reverse-Flash. Additionally, Catwoman works as a double agent within their ranks on behalf of Batman's Insurgency. The Society intend to fill the power vacuum left by the Justice League from the other reality and the Insurgency defeating High Councilor Superman and his Regime, though Grodd secretly works with Brainiac to help him destroy the Earth. Once the other members discover this however, they disband the group.
- The Secret Society appears as a team bonus in DC Heroes and Villains, consisting of Vandal Savage, Cheshire, Livewire, Copperhead, and Ultra-Humanite.

=== Miscellaneous ===
A team based on the Justice Underground called the Brotherhood of Justice appears in Teen Titans Go! #48, consisting of heroic, alternate reality variants of General Immortus, Psimon, Mammoth, Doctor Light, and Madame Rouge.
