= Shrike (DC Comics) =

Shrike is the name of multiple characters appearing in American comic books published by DC Comics.

== Fictional character biographies ==
=== Toros Tos ===
Shrike

Publication information
- Publisher: DC Comics
- First appearance: Hawkman #11 (December 1965/January 1966)
- Created by: Dave Cockrum, Gardner Fox, and Murphy Anderson

In-story information
- Alter ego: Toros Tos
- Place of origin: Moronon
- Notable aliases: Demon-Bird
- Abilities: Flight; Ability to understand all languages; Can generate lightning, powerful winds, and ice from his wings

Toros Tos is an orphan from the planet Moronon, whose inhabitants possess wings. He is raised on Earth by Native Americans who believe him to be a messenger of Kukulkan, sent to reclaim their stolen treasures from colonizers. As Shrike, Toros encounters Hawkman and Hawkgirl, Thanagarian police officers who cure his delusion of being a god. They return him to Moronon and help him reclaim his throne from Boros Bron, who usurped it from his parents.

=== Vanessa Kingsbury ===
Vanessa Kingsbury is an escaped mental patient who was empowered by the Overmaster, transformed into a bird-like metahuman, and joined his original Cadre. Her childlike personality renders her easily manipulated and gives her poor control of her powers. After embarking on a religious"spiritual quest" and killing 33 men, Shrike joins the Suicide Squad, where she is killed in battle with the military of Ogaden. In Blackest Night, Shrike's corpse is reanimated as a Black Lantern.

=== Third Shrike ===
Shrike
- Shrike, art by Javier Pulido and Marcos Martin.

Publication information
- Publisher: DC Comics
- First appearance: Robin: Year One #3 (December 2000)
- Created by: Chuck Dixon, Scott Beatty, Javier Pulido, and Marcos Martin

In-story information
- Alter ego: Daniel King
- Team affiliations: League of Assassins
- Abilities: Exceptional martial artist

The third Shrike was created by writers Chuck Dixon and Scott Beatty, and first appeared in Robin Year One #3.

A member of Ra's al Ghul's League of Assassins, the master martial artist Shrike operated a school for killers called the Vengeance Academy, teaching young children how to be assassins. After a disastrous encounter with Two-Face forced him to give up his Robin identity, Dick Grayson infiltrated the Vengeance Academy to earn back Batman's trust. When Shrike takes an assassination contract on Two-Face, he sends a number of his students to carry out the assassination, including Dick and Shrike's top student, a boy named Boone. Dick saves both Boone and Two-Face in the ensuing battle, confirming Shrike's suspicions that he is a spy. Batman arrives to save Dick, only to be wounded by Shrike. Two-Face arrives, intending to kill his would-be assassins, and accidentally kills Shrike just as the assassin is preparing to kill Dick.

=== Boone ===
Shrike
- Shrike as depicted in Nightwing Secret Files #1 (August 1999). Art by Scott McDaniel.

Publication information
- Publisher: DC Comics
- First appearance: Nightwing Secret Files & Origins #1 (October 1999)
- Created by: Chuck Dixon (writer); Scott McDaniel (artist)

In-story information
- Alter ego: Unknown
- Team affiliations: Vengeance Academy; League of Assassins; The Society; Suicide Squad
- Notable aliases: Boone; Wayne Wilkins Jr. Ruby Eyes; General War
- Abilities: Exceptional martial artist

As a teenager, the boy known only as Boone was a friend of Dick Grayson, who would grow up to become Nightwing. As Dick is learning under the tutelage of the heroic Batman, Boone travels throughout the Pacific Rim, learning martial arts from a number of teachers, including several former members of Ra's al Ghul's League of Assassins. In Hong Kong, Boone encountered Shrike, the "Master" who would turn him into a skilled and disciplined killing machine. Boone was part of the Vengeance Academy that Shrike operated in Gotham City, training young teens to become assassins. Dick Grayson, temporarily fired by Batman, infiltrated the school after an "audition" and formed a hesitant friendship with Boone. After Dick revealed the school to Batman following an abortive assassination attempt by the students on Two Face, leading to the death of Shrike, Boone swore to avenge his master. After meeting with Talia al Ghul, Boone continued his education by members of the League of Assassins. Taking on his mentor's name, the new Shrike became one of the world's foremost assassins, killing throughout Asia and the former Eastern Bloc, before returning to America to become the new chief enforcer of criminal kingpin Blockbuster. Shrike later appeared as a member of Nyssa al Ghul's new League of Assassins.

In 2016, DC Comics implemented another relaunch of its books called "DC Rebirth" which restored its continuity to a form much as it was prior to "The New 52". Boone is seen in Zombalia partaking in a card game with Fiddler, Psych, and Vortex. After Psych admits that he cheated in the game, he uses a psychic projection of everyone who the three villains had killed over the years to kill them.

Following DC's "Infinite Frontier" relaunch, Boone appears alive as a member of the Suicide Squad under Peacemaker. After the deaths of Bolt and Film Freak, Boone is left to be killed by the Joker's laughing gas. His brother, code-named Blue Shrike, appears as well, battling Nightwing in honor of his brother on Lazarus Island.

=== Queen Shrike ===
Khea Taramka is a Thanagarian who has been the queen of Hawkworld for over two thousand years. After capturing Hawkgirl, she reveals that she is the mother of Princess Chay-Ara, Hawkgirl's original incarnation. The Predator, a cosmic entity and source of power for the Star Sapphires, possesses Taramka and states its intent to kill Hawkman and Hawkgirl. The Hawks separate Taramka from the entity, then the skeletons from their past incarnations appear to take the queen to another dimension.

== Powers and abilities ==
Toros Tos, Vanessa Kingsbury, and Khea Taramka are all winged humanoids who are capable of flight. Toros possesses the additional ability to generate ice, electricity, and powerful winds from his wings.

The third incarnation of Shrike and Boone use a number of bladed and spiked weapons, such as swords, bladed tonfa, knives, and shurikens.

== In other media ==
- The Boone incarnation of Shrike makes a non-speaking cameo appearance in Superman/Batman: Public Enemies.
- The Boone incarnation of Shrike appears as a character summon in Scribblenauts Unmasked: A DC Comics Adventure.
- The Boone incarnation of Shrike appears in Batman: Arkham Shadow, voiced by Rick Gomez. This version, whose full name is Boone Carver, is a troubled youth, a close friend of Dick Grayson, and a former inmate of Blackgate Prison who became one of the Rat King's top lieutenants. After a failed attempt to kill acting police Commissioner Jim Gordon, he is pursued by Batman to the Solomon Wayne Courthouse, where Shrike has taken Leslie Thompkins and District Attorney Harvey Dent hostage. Batman rescues the hostages and confronts Shrike, but the latter commits suicide by setting himself on fire whilst being held by Batman, causing him to fall to his death.
