= Mad Dog (DC Comics) =

Mad Dog is the name of several characters appearing in American comic books published by DC Comics. Two of them are associated with Batman.

== Publication history ==
The third Mad Dog was created by writer Andersen Gabrych and artist Ale Garza. He first appeared as an enemy of Cassandra Cain (then Batgirl) in Batgirl (vol. 2) #67 (October 2005).

== Fictional character biography ==
=== Lucas "Mad Dog" McGill ===
Lucas "Mad Dog" McGill is a highly dangerous criminal who is wanted in several states for multiple counts of murder and notorious for shooting men in the back. One night while beating a woman in the streets, he met a young Jonah Hex (who was drunk at the time). In his inebriated state, Jonah Hex believed that McGill was his father Woodson Hex abusing his mother Ginny and shot him dead where he stood. He was rewarded with a substantial sum of money by the local sheriff immediately afterward. This encounter inspired Jonah Hex to become a bounty hunter. Jonah's wife, Tall Bird, later recounted this story to historians documenting Jonah Hex's life story.

=== Martin "Mad Dog" Hawkins ===
A serial killer named Martin "Mad Dog" Hawkins was created in Who's Who: The Definitive Directory of the DC Universe #1 and featured in Arkham Asylum: A Serious House on Serious Earth. Batman reads about him in Amadeus Arkham's diaries. Hawkins comes from a wealthy, prominent family, and from a young age is beaten and sexually abused by his father. He grows up to become a serial killer who rapes, mutilates, and murders women and young girls, removing their faces and sexual organs afterward. He claims to see visions of the Virgin Mary, who tells him to "stop the dirty sluts from spreading their disease". When he is finally caught, he is institutionalized in the State Psychiatric Hospital in Metropolis, treated by psychiatrist Amadeus Arkham. When Arkham goes back to Gotham City and opens Arkham Asylum, he finds that Hawkins had broken into his house,killed,and raped his wife and daughter. Hawkins is quickly captured again and sentenced to Arkham Asylum, becoming one of its first patients, once again under Amadeus Arkham's care. During their sessions, Hawkins takes great pleasure in describing the murders of Arkham's family. Arkham appears to take this all in his stride and perseveres, earning praise from his colleagues for his dedication to mental health and rehabilitation. On the anniversary of the murder, Arkham performs lethal electroshock therapy on Hawkins under the pretense of curing him.

=== David Cain's son ===
The Mad Dog
- The Mad Dog, art by Ale Garza.

Publication information
- Publisher: DC Comics
- First appearance: Batgirl (vol. 2) #67 (October 2005)
- Created by: Andersen Gabrych (writer); Ale Garza (artist)

In-story information
- Alter ego: "The Mad Dog" Cain
- Team affiliations: League of Assassins
- Abilities: Master martial artist

David Cain, one of the world's premier assassins, was by the nature of his profession a very lonely man and began thinking about what he would leave behind when he died. He wished for a "perfect child" – specifically a "perfect artisan of his craft".

Cain, was at this time, a member of Ra's al Ghul's League of Assassins. Ra's had created the League to be "the fang that protects his head", but he had grown tired of the uncertain loyalties of its members. When he learned of the theories Cain was developing to train a perfect killer, Ra's was intrigued, and supplied Cain with infant test subjects in the hopes of creating a new generation of assassins. This experiment proved disastrous; those infants that survived eventually turned on one another until only one boy remained. Ra's ordered Ubu to kill the boy "like a mad dog". The guard, however, took pity on the abused child, and secretly set him free in the woods instead. Cain and Ra's al Ghul did not know that the boy still lived, and Cain began a new experiment, raising his own daughter, Cassandra, to replace his earlier failures.

Ra's al Ghul's daughter Nyssa Raatko did know that "the Mad Dog" had survived. Years later, after Ra's' death, she sought out the Mad Dog and made him a member of her new League of Assassins. She took him on as a protégé, telling him everything about the experiments, and about who he was intended to be.

Cassandra gathered evidence indicating that Lady Shiva was her mother, and sought out Shiva to confirm this. At the time Shiva was the sensei of Nyssa's new League. When Batgirl arrived, she played a key role in the rebirth of Mr. Freeze's wife Nora Fries as Lazara, and several League members died in the resulting chaos. Due to the conflict between their loyalty to Shiva and Nyssa and their near-worship of Batgirl as "the One Who is All" the League split at that point, with several members pledging themselves to Cassandra. Several more members of the League died when the Mad Dog went on a killing spree. The Mad Dog later kills Batgirl, but Shiva quickly resurrects her with a Lazarus Pit.

=== Rex ===
In the New 52 (a reboot of DC's continuity), a new character named Mad Dog appeared with only his first name reveled Rex. This version of the character is a bounty hunter for an unnamed organization that "pays his bills", but has ties to the League of Assassins and Leviathan. He is hired to go after the Suicide Squad to recover a newborn baby the Squad had kidnapped. Mad Dog knows Deadshot's secret identity, and is surprised that Deadshot is a member of the Squad and not incarcerated at Belle Reve. While using thermal vision on his mask to see through smoke, Mad Dog shoots Black Spider in the chest and blows up a diner with Black Spider and El Diablo inside. Before he can fire any more shots and steal "the package", Harley Quinn releases knockout gas to prevent further gunfire. Mad Dog and his team find Deadshot and Harley at their hideout and chase them inside. Harley has once again turned on the gas to prevent any gunfire from Mad Dog inside the hideout. They evacuate the building, which then explodes. As Mad Dog flees, swearing revenge on Deadshot, he encounters King Shark. When King Shark rejoins his fellow Squad members, he is seen wearing Mad Dog's necklace, implying that he killed him.

During DC Rebirth, Mad Dog appears on the one-shot special Suicide Squad: War Crimes Special #1. After being charged with a crime he claims he did not commit, he is forced to join Amanda Waller's Task Force X. Like the other members, he has a bomb implanted in his brain which will detonate and kill him if he fails a mission or is captured. During a mission to retrieve a retired American politician who had been kidnapped and taken to Europe to be tried for war crimes, Mad Dog is injured and asks Captain Boomerang to help him get on the escape vehicle. Boomerang betrays him by kicking him off the vehicle, allowing him to be captured. To prevent the mission from being compromised, Waller detonates Mad Dog's implant, killing him.

== In other media ==
An original, African-American incarnation of "Mad Dog" appears in the Batwoman episode "Off With Her Head", portrayed by Jarett John. This version is a small-time gangster.
