= Lady Shiva =

Fictional character

- Lady Shiva, as depicted in Batgirl (vol. 6) #1 (2024). Art by Takeshi Miyazawa and Mike Spicer

Publication information
- Publisher: DC Comics
- First appearance: Richard Dragon, Kung Fu Fighter #5 (December 1975)
- Created by: Dennis O'Neil (writer); Ric Estrada (artist)

In-story information
- Alter ego: Wu Ming-Yue (birth name); Sandra Wu-San (Woosan) (adoptive name)
- Species: Human
- Place of origin: China
- Team affiliations: The Brotherhood of the Fist; League of Assassins; Birds of Prey; Society; Outsiders; Justice League
- Partnerships: Richard Dragon; Bronze Tiger; Black Canary; Cassandra Cain
- Supporting character of: Batgirl (Cassandra Cain)
- Notable aliases: Jade Canary, The Paper Monkey, Tengu Mask, Master Woman, Agent Silver, Sandra Wu-San, Agent WooSan
- Abilities: Master martial artist, assassin, and swordswoman; mastery of virtually all known (and various unknown) martial disciplines and vast weaponry.; Able to read body language to anticipate an opponents' actions and weaknesses.

Lady Shiva (Sandra Wu-San or Sandra Woosan; birth name Wu Ming-Ye) is a fictional character appearing in American comic books published by DC Comics. The character was co-created by Dennis O'Neil and Ric Estrada, and first appeared in Richard Dragon, Kung Fu Fighter #5. Having varied origins and ties to superheroes such as Batman and Batgirl, the character serves as one of the most premier martial artists in the DC Universe.

A martial artist from China, her varied backgrounds commonly have her befriend Richard Dragon and Bronze Tiger, with each becoming a renowned martial artist, while she and Bronze Tiger become regarded as among the deadliest assassins and mercenaries in the world. Differing from her earliest stories, her sisters' killer would retroactively be revealed to be the world-class assassin and eugenics enthusiast David Cain, who coerced her into having her first-born daughter, Cassandra Cain, in hopes of creating a supremely skilled assassin. A supreme master of martial arts, she has ties with other heroes and teams, including the Question, Black Canary, and the Birds of Prey, and has been heavily associated with the League of Assassins and derivatives such as the League of Shadows.

Lady Shiva has been adapted in several media. She made her first live-action debut in the short-lived Birds of Prey, portrayed by Sung-Hi Lee. She also appears in various animated features such as Beware the Batman, voiced by Finola Hughes, and Young Justice, voiced by Gwendoline Yeo.

== Publication history ==
Lady Shiva was cread by Dennis O'Neil and Ric Estrada, first appearing Richard Dragon, Kung Fu Fighter #5 (December, 1975).

== Characterization ==
As a prominent martial artist and assassin in the DC Universe, she is noted as the most dangeous, considered nearly peerless in unarmed combat and with a sword. Her prowess is typically officially attributed to surpass Batman. Several other heroes and fighers are stated to be on par or rival her abilities, which includes: Bronze Tiger, Connor Hawke, Black Canary, the Twelve Brothers in Silk, David Cain, Cassandra Cain, and Richard Dragon.

=== Personality and motivation ===
Lady Shiva is often characterized as a thrill-seeking combatant looking for a challenge, with her motivations contested but has been attributed to a death wish, boredom, and vengeance against David Cain for the death of her sister and subsequent sexual assault. Her earlier stories lacked the darker characterization; similarly a thrill-seeking daredevil, she was witty, often sarcastically joked in feminine frailty before defeating her opponents, and her vested interest in some martial artist included aiding them building up their abilities to create a challenge for her in the future. While mother of both Cassandra Cain and Tenji Turner, her relation with the former is noted to be complex.

=== Powers and abilities ===
Lady Shiva has mastered both common and obscure martial arts. In unarmed combat, she blends various disciplines that benefit her frame and size, including Judo, Karate, Kuroshi, Savate, Capoeira, and Kung-Fu. Shiva is also adept with traditional samurai and ninja weaponry. Training and continuous combat experience have allowed Shiva to maintain her elite fighting skills over time.

Alongside her martial abilities, Shiva is an expert at reading her opponent's body language to learn of weak points. An expert assassin, her abilities and reputation makes her an intimidating figure in the criminal underworld and is skilled in deception enough to obscure her true age, background, and misdirect individuals. Shiva is also an expert in medicine and known healing arts techniques. These abilities eventually extended into manipulation of qi, allowing her to rapidly heal others.

== Fictional character biography ==
=== Pre-Crisis of Infinite Earths ===
Lady Shiva, originally introduced as Sandra Woosan, is the sister of Carolyn Woosan, the love interest of Richard Dragon. Renowned as one of the world's deadliest martial artists, she adopted the name Shiva, inspired by the Hindu god of destruction. Blaming Richard Dragon for her sister's death, Sandra challenges him to a deadly duel. Later, Dragon reveals that Guano Cravat, a corrupt industrialist who hired her, manipulated Sandra by falsely implicating him in Carolyn's death. Together, Shiva and Dragon defeat Cravat, with Dragon persuading her to spare his life. Subsequently, Shiva allies with Dragon and Ben Turner, assisting them in various missions under the leadership of spymaster Barney Ling, head of G.O.O.D., until Turner's disappearance and memory loss to pursue solo missions.

=== Post-Crisis on Infinite Earths ===
Following the Crisis on Infinite Earths storyline in 1985, aspects of Shiva's past was revealed and her history changed over time. Part of her origin first revealed she was raised in an unknown village in China (whose location and inhabitants remain purposely secretive) under the guidance of a cruel and strict woman only known as "Mother", with it unknown if she was simply her guardian or her true biological mother. The woman cruelly raised young Sandra as a fighter her with "Shiva" moniker, granted to the appointed guardian of the village. Shiva would also be known to reside in Detroit although the exact reason remain unknown. In Detroit, she and her older sister Carolyn, practiced martial arts and the pair later became sensationalist martial artist duo with a deep bond although Sandra often held back against her older sister. Their skills are noticed by David Cain, a trainer for the League of Assassins who becomes enamored with Sandra, believing her a kindred spirit and capable of producing a child suited for the role of Ra's al Ghul's bodyguard as well as his successor and assistant due to her high fighting abilities. She later joins the League of Assassins.

During her assassin training, David Cain murders Carolyn. Sandra confronts him, but is outsmarted and beaten by him. He allows her to live, but only if she conceives a child with him, thus he rapes her. Sandra later recounts allowing David to live because he showed her how Carolyn had held her back and that she had only been driven by "petty revenge". However, Sandra's true desire for revenge drove her to greater heights of martial artistry and she gives birth to future martial arts prodigy and hero, Cassandra Cain.

==== Newer exploits ====
Shiva, as she appeared throughout the 1990s. Art by Ron Frenz.

In the 1987 Question series, Shiva is hired by corrupt adjunct to the mayor of Hub City, Reverend Hatch, to battle the crimefighter the Question, an act she does so with ease. She witnesses Hatch's men brutalize him further. Witnessing a "passion for combat", she rescues him from near death and brings him to Richard Dragon to train and give him a chance to fulfill his potential. The pair meet shortly after and battle again, ending it swiftly but once more confirms her suspicions of his "warrior's passion" while Sage simply wanted to see what would happen if they fought before leaving him, not revealing why she saved him. The ordeal left her credited as the one to train Sage.

Shiva eventually travels to Manchuria to visit with her godfather, O-Sensei, former instructor of Richard Dragon and Bronze Tiger. After living over 150 years, he has finally decided to die. He intends to keep a promise to his wife, and be buried alongside her, but his wife's family had hidden her remains to punish him for abandoning her. O-Sensei has Shiva select three warriors to aid him in the search for her remains: the Question, Green Arrow, and Batman. Reluctant to acknowledge O-Sensei's death wish, Shiva expresses her ambivalence both verbally and physically, unnecessarily applying deadly force in battles with O-Sensei's assailants. Shiva and O-Sensei then travel to Hub City, meeting with the Question, who, in turn, brokered Shiva's first meeting with Batman. Compelled to test his skill, Shiva immediately fights the vigilante only to be stopped by O-Sensei. They do, however, convince Batman to aid them. In their search for Green Arrow, Shiva encounters slave traders, killing all except one, who successfully cuts her; she rewards him with a kiss on the forehead. After locating Green Arrow, she meets Black Canary for the first time, and spars with the hero. Although Canary does not know it at the time, the two had both studied under Sensei Otomo, though non-concurrently. After recruiting Green Arrow, Shiva returns to Hub City, and saves the Question from an attack by former employees of the now-dead Reverend Hatch. Shiva kills the men, who had been after a fortune in embezzled funds stored in Hatch's abandoned home, and sets fire to the money. Later, she nurses the Question's elderly friend Tot back to health. While the Question puzzles over her inscrutable and violent nature, she confesses that O-Sensei was "the one man I am certain I would not harm if he kissed me". When Batman discovers that the remains of O-Sensei's wife had been moved to a small island, Shiva, O-Sensei, Green Arrow, and the Question set out for the island, only to be caught in a storm. O-Sensei is lost overboard, but the group discovers that his wife's remains had likewise been mislaid, years earlier, while in transport, leaving O-Sensei's promise fulfilled.

In the 1991 "Robin: A Hero Reborn" storyline, she garners an interest in discovering techniques from defeated martial artist such as Koroshi, a master of karate, and seeks the one rumored to defeat him, King Snake, and encounters Tim Drake, the third person to hold the Robin codename and battle Snake's Ghost Dragons criminal organization as part of his training. Seeing potential, she takes him as a student to train him for a few weeks in one weapon although she is critical of his choice in the non-lethal bō, the reason in which Robin chose the weapon. He manages to defeat her in a sparring match using a whistle to distracted her and is awarded with a collapsible bō. Later, they discover the Ghost Dragon's development of a plague and the pair ally with Clyde Rawlins to stop them from releasing. Dragon escapes with few canisters and is tracked to Hong Kong, where they defeat him although Rawlin dies in the conflict and Shiva simply watches. When Snake hangs from a ledge, she urges him to kill the man to signify his graduation and become her "weapon" When he refuses and leaves, Shiva throws Snake off the ledge herself although he survives.

=== Getting involved with Gotham ===
After Bane breaks Batman's back, Batman seeks training from Shiva to help him regain his skills and fighting spirit (see Batman: Knightfall: KnightsEnd). Though she deems him unworthy of her efforts, she devises a training regimen, out of respect for what he had been before his injuries. As part of this training, Shiva kills the Armless Master, a sensei notable for training Catwoman, while wearing a tengu mask, making sure that his death was both witnessed and relayed to his best students. Shiva then makes Batman wear the mask while performing training missions. He is then ambushed by the master's students, who mistake him for the "Tengu Mask warrior". He defeats all of them in turn, but Shiva attempts to complete Batman's training by manipulating him into killing an opponent using her fatal Leopard Blow. Batman simply feigns using the maneuver on an assailant to trick her into believing he used lethal force. Shiva later discovers the truth, but does not seek vengeance.

Later, she helps Batman fight Ra's al Ghul and his League of Assassins, including Bane, when Ghul attempts to release a deadly virus called Ebola Gulf A that would have killed half the world's population (see Batman: Legacy). The trail leads Batman to Calcutta, India. Since their knowledge of the city is limited, Oracle contacts Shiva, who agrees to help Batman. Together they defeat Ghul's men and prevent the virus from being released.

Shiva later travels to an army base in Transbelvia to fight a young political rebel and martial artist named Dava Sbörsc, who specializes in undefeatable "single-blow techniques" and wishes to learn Shiva's Leopard Blow. Instead, Dava's friend, her former pupil Tim Drake, in his identity as Robin, jumps into the fray in her place. Granted superspeed by a drug Dava gave him, and unused to its effects, Robin unwittingly uses lethal force, killing Shiva in battle. He quickly administers CPR, both reviving Shiva and dosing her with the drug. Thus enhanced, she kills attacking soldiers while Robin and Dava make their escape, vanishing immediately after.

During the "Brotherhood of the Fist" story arc, Shiva fights in the Brotherhood of the Monkey Fist's martial arts tournament under the alias "Paper Monkey". In a final, close battle, she fights and defeats Connor Hawke, the Green Arrow. As repayment for saving her life, Robin asks her to spare Connor. She relents, warning Robin that this use of her favor means she would challenge and kill him when he grew older.

Over the years, Shiva amasses groups of followers who worship her as an incarnation of Shiva, the Hindu god of destruction. She pays them little attention, occasionally using them as lackeys or killing them when it suits her whims. Some of her followers have even created temples to honor her victories, one of which is in Gotham, which she later destroys.

=== Shiva and Batgirl ===
At age 8, Shiva's daughter Cassandra flees from David Cain, horrified after killing a man with her bare hands on her first assassination. She then wanders the world as a mute, and, seeking redemption, finds herself in Gotham City during the events of No Man's Land. Seeing promise in Cassandra, Batman and former Batgirl, Barbara Gordon, give Cassandra their blessings to take up the mantle of Batgirl.

Eventually, Batgirl's skills attract Shiva's attention. Without telling her of their relationship, Shiva challenges Batgirl to a battle to the death. To Shiva's disappointment, she defeats Batgirl soundly. Batgirl's body language fluency is newly impaired by a telepath's forcible inculcation of the ability to speak. Wanting to fight Batgirl at her peak, Shiva spares her life, and promises to retrain her on the condition that they have a rematch in one year. The secret to being undefeatable, Shiva explains, is to not fear death, even to seek it. Under Shiva's care, Batgirl soon regains her abilities.

Shiva reappears to fight Batgirl at the Forum of The Twelve Caesars, and kills her in combat. Realizing that Batgirl had not given her all, Shiva revives her. Batgirl admits to harboring a death wish ever since Cain first forced her to kill; her ability to perfectly read the agony of her victim had deeply traumatized her. Having overcome her death wish, Batgirl fights Shiva again, shattering her sword. In the midst of battle, Batgirl accuses Shiva of having a death wish herself, really only traveling and fighting in search of her own death. Batgirl thus defeats Shiva.

=== A new Sensei ===
In Gail Simone's Birds of Prey series, during a joint hunt with Black Canary for the murderer of a shared, beloved sensei, a sensei Shiva so respected that she has vowed to never use anything he taught her in a fight where her goal was the death of her opponent, Shiva is beaten and kidnapped by supervillain Cheshire. Cheshire ties up, gags and locks Shiva in the trunk of a car wired with explosives, so as to use a charred corpse in a plan to fake her death and flee the country after murdering a senator. Shiva is saved when Catwoman discovers her. After Cheshire confesses to murdering their sensei, Black Canary punches her out of a helicopter (using Ted Grant's Haymaker) to prevent Shiva from killing her in a vengeful rage. Shiva subsequently offers to share her knowledge with Black Canary, who takes her offer under consideration.

Cassandra begins to suspect that Shiva is her mother, but cannot provoke Cain into an admission. She embarks on a search for Shiva, eventually finding her as the new sensei of the League of Assassins under the leadership of Nyssa Raatko, Ra's al Ghul's eldest daughter. In battle, Cassandra sacrifices her life to save former League member Tigris from an attack by her own unsuccessful experimental predecessor, Mad Dog. Shiva decides to resurrect Cassandra in a Lazarus Pit to reveal the truth of her heritage, and fight her once more.

On reviving her, Shiva admits that the reason she agreed to give birth was that she hoped her child would be the one to kill her. In an evenly matched battle, Cassandra breaks Shiva's neck, paralyzing her. She appears ready to place Shiva in the Lazarus Pit, but Shiva pleads with her not to do so. In response, Cassandra impales Shiva on a hook hanging over the pit, apparently killing her. Although Cassandra's intent regarding this action is left ambiguous, whether to kill her or let her fall into the pit and be revived, it has been confirmed that Shiva is alive in One Year Later. Cassandra then abandons the identity of Batgirl and returns to her life as a wanderer.

During the Infinite Crisis storyline, Shiva appears as a member of Alexander Luthor Jr.'s Secret Society of Super Villains.

=== "One Year Later" ===
Shiva as the Jade Canary, from Birds of Prey #92 (May 2006). Art by Paulo Siqueira.

In the 2006 "One Year Later" storyline, having switched places with Black Canary to allow them both to experience each other's life experiences, Shiva joins Oracle's covert team of female operatives known as the Birds of Prey (with Canary hoping that spending time with them would soften Shiva), using the name "Jade Canary". Shiva remains unchanged, however. Oracle semiseriously refers to Shiva as a sociopath, and refuses to call Shiva by the Jade Canary title, even though Shiva (as part of the deal with Canary) has taken to wearing Black Canary's boots and trademark fishnet stockings (though she hates wearing them).

Shiva continues to perform solo work, and visits Robin to assist him (much to Robin's chagrin) in discovering the truth behind Batgirl's recent disappearance and recent upheaval within the League of Assassins. She refuses to allow herself or Oracle's team to be involved, and instead trusts her former pupil to handle the situation. It appears that she holds no ill-will towards Cassandra as she informs Tim that she hopes that her daughter is well.

During a recent mission, Oracle's team confronts the villain Prometheus, whose helmet allows him to copy the skills of 30 of the world's greatest martial artists, including Shiva herself. This had allowed him a victory against Batman in the past. Shiva believes that his files on her would be out of date, and that she would be able to defeat her "old self". She seems unconcerned about the skills of the other 29 fighters, and apparently decides to attack Prometheus head-on. Prometheus, however, has more up-to-date files than Shiva suspected, and in three seconds knocks her to the ground. After this defeat, Shiva vanishes, leaving a message for Black Canary: "Tell the Canary, I release her".

Stripped of her chance to mold Black Canary in her own image, and stripped of Sin, the young girl who was next in line as her successor, Shiva is last seen talking to Bethany Thorne, daughter of the Crime Doctor. It appears that she is yet again hoping to train a new heir in the art of her lethal form of martial arts.

Lady Shiva as she appears in the cover of Birds of Prey (2010- 2011) #6.

Shiva is no longer an active member of the Birds of Prey, but continues to be protective of her former teammates. Such is the case when the Birds of Prey are being threatened by Spy Smasher, who attempts to steal control away from Oracle. After a mission in Russia, Oracle and Spy Smasher fight against one another for control of the team. Although Oracle is unable to use her legs, she is victorious, although Spy Smasher attempts to go back on their deal. Unfortunately, she is confronted outside by every single living Birds of Prey Agent Oracle has ever recruited, who warn her against ever going after Oracle again; Lady Shiva is among them. When Barbara later asks the others who called Shiva, no one responds.

=== "Blackest Night" ===
During the events of the "Blackest Night", Shiva tracks down Renee Montoya, the new Question, and tells her she intends to test her in battle. The two women begin their duel, only to be interrupted when Victor Sage, now a reanimated Black Lantern, arrives on the scene and attacks them. Using his new supernatural abilities, Sage effortlessly defeats Shiva and tries to kill her by tearing out her heart. However, Shiva realizes that the Black Lanterns feed on human emotion, and cuts herself off from all feeling through the use of meditation, rendering her invisible to Sage. After the others on the scene do the same, Victor angrily departs.

=== "Brightest Day" ===
During the events of the "Brightest Day" crossover, a new martial artist known as the White Canary comes to Gotham and sets a plan into motion to ruin Black Canary's life by framing her for the murder of a European terrorist. When Black Canary first encounters the White Canary, she muses that the villain may be Shiva in disguise. but later White Canary pits Black Canary against Lady Shiva in an honor bound match to the death after breaking Black Canary's wrist, thereby making sure she would be killed. Both parties accept because White Canary dangles the life of Sin, Black Canary's adopted daughter, as her bait. However, Huntress challenges Shiva instead and even manages to knock her down, to everyone's surprise, even after receiving many blows. The death match is stopped when Black Canary rescues Sin herself and points out a technicality, they need not continue the battle to the death immediately and can pick it up at any time in the future.

=== The New 52 onward ===
Following the New 52 reboot in 2011, a new version of Lady Shiva debuted in 2012. This version of Shiva, de-aged and younger compared to her original counterpart, was said to be comparable in age to Dick Grayson (although she hints it is an intended misdirection) and was already a master assassin by the time she was a teenager. This version also bore a different costume, appearing in a teal kabuki-like garb and mask, in full gear she appears to have a long, auburn braid with blades embedded in the hair that can be used offensively, but this is merely a wig connected to her mask. Some details of her past was revealed, having suffered from a childhood filled with trauma in which left a desire for vengeance and trained to become a martial artist and assassin-for-hire. She eventually joined the League of Assassins and named herself "Lady Shiva" after the Hindu god of destruction, serving as a trainer. She once had an encounter with Batman and Dick Grayson, the latter whose potential interests her. Among those she has trained included Bronze Tiger (whom she was said to have a long history with) and Red Hood.

In the 2014 "Nightwing: Death of a Family" storyline, Shiva returns to Gotham City several years later to kill another target and Dick Grayson, now Nightwing, sets out to stop her. He is surprised to see that she remembers him from their first encounter and even more so when she praises his progress since their last meeting. She repeats that he is squandering his natural talent by not learning from her. Shiva completes her mission by throwing an axe at the S.E.C building door (to intimidate into initiating lockdown) but quickly realises that Nightwing was already injured before their fight. To Dick Grayson's surprise she says that him fighting at a disadvantage shows more than he knows and that he has too much skill to kill without a concrete reason. It is later revealed that Penguin hired her and told Nightwing about her mission in the hopes that either he'd be saved from paying Shiva's high fees, or that she would kill Nightwing. Later, she fights alongside Bronze Tiger, Cheshire, December Graystone, Rictus, and Red Hood as the Untitled infiltrated the League of Assassin's secret city.

==== DC Rebirth ====
In DC Rebirth, Shiva appears in the flesh at the end of Detective Comics #950, observing Cassandra Cain from a rooftop. Batman later finds out from both Shiva herself and Ra's that she has separated from him and the League of Assassins, believing him to be too complacent with the wealthy and aiming for peace rather than destruction. She had taken Ra's' secret League of Shadows with her, and was responsible for multiple attacks across the city and attacks on the anti-League military squad, the Colony. After a duel with Cassandra, Ra's al Ghul appears and kills Shiva with the intent of later resurrecting her for questioning.

=== DC All-In ===
==== Revised background ====
The character's origin is once more revised; now of Japanese and Chinese descent of the Wu family, in which is connected to the Blood, a ninja clan whose pact with dark spirits allows them to weaponize their blood. Her birth name is also revealed as Ming-Yue, and both she and her older sister (Mei-Xing) had fled from their own at an early age due to their uncle's enmity. They eventually ended up in Detroit, where they adopted new identities (Sandra and Carolyn Wu-San, respectively).

This background is mixed in with similar adventures in earlier stories, becoming involved with O-Sensei as well as his goddaughters and establishing a close friendship with Richard Dragon and Bronze Tiger. Carolyn is established as a fellow martial artist, later killed by assassin trainer David Cain in a gambit to eventually sexually coerce her, as expressed in past storylines. Sandra is also revealed to be the biological mother of the teenage Jade Tiger, a martial artist whose protective father (Bronze Tiger) ensured the secrecy of his existence and only allowed Sandra to see him once every year on his birthday in an effort to avert an upbringing similar to Cassandra.

==== Batgirl (2025) and other appearances ====
In the first storyline of the 2025 Batgirl series, Shiva enlists the aid of Cassandra Cain, the Blood, and the League of Shadows in battling the Unburied, an previously unknown monastic order with a vendetta against Shiva. She and Cassandra are eventually captured, and it is revealed that Shiva stole sacred, empowering blue poppies from the Unburied, generations after Ra's al Ghul first introduced the flowers to their homeland (and similarly betrayed their trust). Shiva confesses to Cassandra that she stole the poppies from the monks' underground home because she ran out of challenges on the surface, leading Cassandra to once again reject her as her mother. The two escape, but Shiva refuses to flee with Cassandra, staying behind to face death at the hands of the Unburied. Following Shiva's presumed death, Cassandra learns of her early life with her sister by reading Shiva's journal and confronting Bronze Tiger.

== Other versions ==
- Sin, a youth from a secluded village in China, was training under the matriarch who once trained Sandra with intention in Sin being her replacement but was instead adopted by Black Canary.
- Inspired by his mother's "Jade Canary" moniker, Tenji Turner adopted the Jade Tiger codename.

== In other media ==
=== Television ===
Lady Shiva as she appears in Birds of Prey.

- Lady Shiva appears in a self-titled episode of Birds of Prey, portrayed by Sung-Hi Lee. This version is a freelance thief and former schoolmate of Helena Kyle who seeks vengeance on Barbara Gordon for the accidental death of her 15-year-old sister, who was killed years prior while Gordon as Batgirl was trying to apprehend Shiva.
- Lady Shiva appears in Beware the Batman, voiced by Finola Hughes. This version is an elite member of the League of Assassins and rival of Katana and fellow League member Silver Monkey, the latter of whom seeks to usurp her position.
- Lady Shiva appears in Young Justice, voiced by Gwendoline Yeo. This version is a member of the League of Shadows and enforcer for the Light.
- According to Arrow recurring guest star Katrina Law, she believed that she was auditioning for Lady Shiva before being cast as Nyssa al Ghul.

=== Film ===
- Lady Shiva makes a cameo appearance in Superman/Batman: Public Enemies, voiced by Rachael MacFarlane.
- Lady Shiva appears in films set in the DC Animated Movie Universe, voiced by Sachie Alessio.
  - Shiva makes a minor appearance in Batman: Hush.
  - Shiva appears in Justice League Dark: Apokolips War. Following Darkseid's invasion of Earth two years prior, she serves as Damian Wayne's right hand, assisting him and the League of Shadows in their efforts to defeat Darkseid by securing a boom tube generator in a LexCorp building until she is killed by a guard.
- Lady Shiva appears in Deathstroke: Knights & Dragons: The Movie, voiced by Panta Mosleh.
- Lady Shiva appears in Batman: Soul of the Dragon, voiced by Kelly Hu.

=== Video games ===
- Lady Shiva appears in DC Universe Online, voiced by DB Cooper.
- Lady Shiva appears as a playable character in the portable version of Lego Batman 2: DC Super Heroes.
- A young Lady Shiva appears in Batman: Arkham Origins, voiced by Kelly Hu. After being hired by the Joker to kill Batman, she tests the latter in a side mission to determine his worth to the League of Assassins. Additionally, she appears as the final boss of the "Initiation" DLC.
- Lady Shiva appears as a character summon in Scribblenauts Unmasked: A DC Comics Adventure.
- Lady Shiva appears as a playable character in Lego DC Super-Villains, voiced by Sumalee Montano.

=== Miscellaneous ===
- Lady Shiva appears in the Batman: Knightfall audio book, voiced by Lorelei King.
- Lady Shiva appears in the audio drama Batman Legends of Robin (1996).
- Lady Shiva appears in DC Super Hero Girls and its tie-in films, voiced by Tania Gunadi.

== Reception ==
In 2011, UGO Networks featured Lady Shiva on their list of 25 Hot Ninja Girls: "She's the type of woman who makes it obvious why Bruce Wayne never really found love - his type is all too capable of kicking his ass". She was ranked No. 8 on the list of Top 10 Fictional Ninjas by Fandomania for being "one of the deadliest martial artists in the DC Comics universe".
