= Catwoman: Hunted =

2022 American-Japanese animated superhero film

- Promotional poster
- Directed by: Shinsuke Terasawa
- Written by: Greg Weisman
- Based on: Catwoman by: Bill Finger; Bob Kane
- Produced by: Ethan Spaulding; Colin A.B.V. Lewis
- Starring: Elizabeth Gillies; Stephanie Beatriz
- Edited by: Robert Ehrenreich
- Music by: Yutaka Yamada
- Production companies: Warner Bros. Animation; DC Entertainment; OLM Team Inoue (animation services)
- Distributed by: Warner Bros. Home Entertainment
- Release date: February 8, 2022
- Running time: 78 minutes
- Countries: United States; Japan
- Language: English

Catwoman: Hunted is a 2022 American animated superhero film based on the DC Comics character Catwoman by Bill Finger and Bob Kane, and produced by Warner Bros. Animation for DC Entertainment. It was released on February 8, 2022, by Warner Bros. Home Entertainment. It is the 48th installment in the DC Universe Animated Original Movies line. The film is directed by Shinsuke Terasawa from a script by Greg Weisman. It stars the voices of Elizabeth Gillies and Stephanie Beatriz. OLM, a Japanese studio behind the Pokémon anime series, provided their animation services for the film with their Team Inoue. The film follows Catwoman as she attempts to steal a priceless jewel, only to get caught in the crosshairs of a powerful consortium of criminals and villains, the Interpol, and Batwoman.

== Plot ==
Catwoman infiltrates a criminal costume party hosted by Barbara Minerva, the perceived head of Leviathan, to steal a gem called the Cat's Eye Emerald from Gotham City mobster and prospective Leviathan member Black Mask. Catwoman evades many pursuing gangsters, but is stopped and knocked out by Batwoman, during which Minerva's aide Tobias Whale recovers the emerald. In retaliation, Minerva marks Catwoman for murder.

Catwoman awakens aboard a plane bound for Shanghai in the custody of Batwoman and Interpol agents Julia Pennyworth and King Faraday. The trio explain they are using the emerald as a tracking beacon to locate and apprehend Leviathan's leaders. In exchange for her cooperation, they offer Catwoman complete amnesty for her past crimes. Catwoman agrees before secretly making contact with her friend Holly to check in with several girls under her care. Once they find Leviathan's hideout, Catwoman and Batwoman infiltrate it, but are attacked by hired assassins Cheshire and Nosferata and several high-ranking Leviathan members. The Leviathan members are defeated and arrested, though Minerva escapes. Catwoman receives her pardon and leaves, seemingly shrugging off the threat Minerva still poses to her life.

Sometime later, Catwoman is attacked by members of the League of Assassins sent by Talia al Ghul, Leviathan's true leader. Catwoman receives help from Batwoman in defeating the assassins, but they are ambushed by Solomon Grundy. Though he knocks out Batwoman, Catwoman defeats him. Angered by this, Minerva transforms into her werecheetah form and attacks Catwoman. Despite receiving grievous injuries, Catwoman taunts Minerva, revealing she recently dismantled one of Leviathan's human trafficking rings and rescued the captives. Minerva lunges for her, but Catwoman dodges and strangles her before they are separated by a lightning strike, with Batwoman rescuing Catwoman while Minerva is incapacitated.

As Interpol takes Minerva and Grundy into custody, Catwoman warns Faraday that Leviathan is still active before retrieving the emerald and leaving to rob the Tower of London.

== Voice cast ==
- Elizabeth Gillies as Catwoman / Selina Kyle
- Stephanie Beatriz as Batwoman / Kate Kane
- Kirby Howell-Baptiste as Cheetah / Barbara Minerva
- Zehra Fazal as Talia al Ghul, Nosferata, Interpol Commando 1
- Steve Blum as Solomon Grundy, Abaddon, Pilot
- Lauren Cohan as Julia Pennyworth
- Jonathan Banks as Black Mask / Roman Sionis
- Keith David as Tobias Whale, Morax
- Jonathan Frakes as King Faraday, Boss Moxie
- Kelly Hu as Cheshire / Jade Nguyen
- Andrew Kishino as Mr. Yakuza (Oyabun Noguri), Leviathan Guard 2, Domino 6
- Eric Lopez as Domino 1, Leviathan Guard 3, Valet 1
- Jacqueline Obradors as La Dama (Amparo Cardenas)
- Ron Yuan as Doctor Tzin-Tzin, Interpol Commando 2

== Production ==
The film was announced on August 17, 2021, alongside its voice cast. The film had an anime-style production with Shinsuke Terasawa directing and written by Greg Weisman while Ethan Spaulding is attached as producer, along with Colin A.B.V. Lewis, who worked on The Simpsons, and Sam Register, who produced multiple DC Animated projects, as executive producers. An exclusive sneak peek was released during the DC FanDome's 2021 Warner Bros. Animation panel.

Weisman considers Catwoman: Hunted to be "adjacent" to his animated series Young Justice. This means that a version of the film's events occurred in the universe of Young Justice, but may not have occurred exactly the same.

== Release ==
Catwoman: Hunted was released on Ultra HD Blu-ray, Blu-ray and DVD in the US and Canada on February 8, 2022.

== Reception ==
The review aggregator Rotten Tomatoes reported an approval rating of 78% based on 9 reviews, with an average rating of 6.6/10.

Jesse Schedeen of IGN gave the film 9 out of 10 stars. He wrote, "Catwoman: Hunted is a fun, anime-flavored superhero adventure that ranks among the best of the DC Universe Movies line."

Dillon Gonzales, writing for Geek Vibes Nation, gave the film a positive review. "Catwoman: Hunted marks a very welcome step from the DCAU towards putting a spotlight on women who are not called Wonder Woman. The effort is not the most vital, but it is one that embraces its sleek sense of fun that makes it very transfixing. The vocal performances capture the allure of these characters quite deftly."

The film earned $407,286 from domestic Blu-ray sales.
