= Talia al Ghul =

Fictional character in DC Comics

- Talia al Ghul taken from a reprint variant cover of Detective Comics #411. Art by Woo Chul Lee (April 2024).

Publication information
- Publisher: DC Comics
- First appearance: Detective Comics #411 (May 1971)
- Created by: Dennis O'Neil (writer); Bob Brown (artist); Dick Giordano (concept)

In-story information
- Species: Human
- Team affiliations: Secret Society of Super Villains; League of Assassins; Leviathan
- Partnerships: Batman; Ra's al Ghul; The Silencer
- Notable aliases: Talia Head; Leviathan; Daughter of the Demon's Head
- Abilities: Expert martial artist and hand-to-hand combatant; Expert swordswoman and markswoman; Access to the Lazarus Pit

Talia al Ghul (/ˈtɑːliə ˌæl ˈɡuːl/; Arabic: تالية الغول, Arabic pronunciation: [taːlijja al.ɣuːl]) is a fictional character appearing in American comic books published by DC Comics. The character was created by writer Dennis O'Neil and artist Bob Brown, and first appeared in Detective Comics #411 (May 1971). Commonly associated with Batman and having been characterized as a morally ambiguous anti-heroine and supervillain, Talia stands as one of the character's most enduring love interests and female adversaries.

Talia is the daughter of the eco-terrorist and supervillain Ra's al Ghul. Following in her father's footsteps, she is a high-ranking member of the League of Assassins and one of the world's greatest spymasters, though she is initially passed for succession by her chauvinistic father. Seeking a suitable male partner to produce a son, she instead falls in love with Batman, both complicating her loyalty to her father and leading to the birth of their son, Damian Wayne. Eventually taking a darker turn, the character has been a leading figure of the Secret Society of Super-Villains, the de facto leader of the League of Assassins, the founder of her own secret society, Leviathan, and eventually established as the leader of the League of Assassins by Ra's himself.

Since the character's inception, Talia has been noted to be among Batman's most compelling villains in spite of contrasting portrayals, noted for her evolution from being a "Bond-girl archetype" into a pivotal and complex character with ambiguous motivations. However, criticism of the character originates from elements of orientalism, including being characterized within the dragon lady stereotype, and being encoded as "ethnic" and "foreign", with no definitive identity due to Ra's conceptual creation by Neal Adams.

Talia has been featured in various media adaptations. The character was voiced by Helen Slater and Olivia Hussey in the DC Animated Universe, which became her first appearances in media other than comic books. The character was subsequently portrayed by Marion Cotillard in the 2012 film The Dark Knight Rises and by Lexa Doig in the Arrowverse television series Arrow.

== Publication history ==
The character was created by the writer Dennis O'Neil and artist Bob Brown as simply Talia originally. The character's creation and depiction was inspired by other works of fiction, such as the 1969 James Bond film On Her Majesty's Secret Service, and the Fu Manchu fiction. The character first appeared in Detective Comics #411 (May 1971).

Grant Morrison's writing of the Batman, Talia, and Damian saga drew from their own personal experience as a child of divorce. The end of Batman Incorporated marked the end of Morrison's seven-year run on the characters.

== Fictional character biography ==
=== Early years ===
The first Talia comic story appears in "Into the Den of the Death-Dealers!" in Detective Comics #411 (May 1971), written by Dennis O'Neil. In the story, Batman rescues her from Dr. Darrk, apparently the leader of the League of Assassins. It is eventually revealed that the League is just one part of Ra's al Ghul's organization, The Demon, and that Darrk apparently turned against Ra's after failing in a mission (the usual punishment for this is death). At the end of the story, she shoots and kills Darrk to save Batman's life.

Talia next appears in "Daughter of the Demon" in Batman #232 (June 1971). In the story, Dick Grayson (Robin) is kidnapped. Ra's al Ghul enters the Batcave, revealing to Batman that he knows Batman's secret identity and saying that Talia was also kidnapped along with Dick. Batman then goes with Ra's to search for Dick and Talia; in the end, it is revealed that Talia loves Batman and that the entire kidnapping is a setup designed by Ra's as a final test of Batman's suitability to be Talia's husband and his successor. Though Batman rejects Ra's offer, he nevertheless returns Talia's feelings. Later on, Ra's and Talia consider Batman to be married to Talia with only their consent necessary in DC Special Series #15 (1978) in the story "I Now Pronounce You Batman and Wife!".

In the years since the character met Batman, Talia is repeatedly depicted as torn between her love for the Caped Crusader and her loyalty to her father. However, she has proven an important ally in her way; most prominently, she encourages Batman to return to Gotham City when it is declared a "No Man's Land" (1999) following an earthquake.

=== Son of the Demon ===
In the noncanonical graphic novel Son of the Demon (1987) by Mike W. Barr, Ra's al Ghul successfully enlists Batman's aid in defeating a rogue assassin who had murdered his wife and Talia's mother, Melisande. Talia witnessed the murder as a young child. During this storyline, Batman marries Talia and the prior marriage from DC Special Series #15 (1978) is referenced. They have sex which results in her becoming pregnant. Batman is nearly killed protecting Talia from an attack by the assassin's agents. In retrospect, Talia concludes that she could never keep Batman, as he would be continuously forced to defend her, so she fakes a miscarriage, and the marriage is dissolved.

In later continuity, after Talia gives birth the child is left at an orphanage. He is adopted and given the name Ibn al Xu'ffasch which is Arabic for 'son of the bat'. The only other clue to the child's heritage is a jewel-encrusted necklace Batman had given to Talia which Talia leaves with the child.

=== Birth of the Demon ===
The graphic novel Batman: Birth of the Demon (1992) by Dennis O'Neil explains how her father met her mother at Woodstock, New York. Talia's mother is confirmed deceased of a drug overdose in this story. This introduction of Talia's mother in particular, (as well as Talia al Ghul's origin) is revised and further elaborated in Batman, Incorporated #2 (2012) by Grant Morrison and Chris Burnham.

=== Bane ===
After Bane enters the League of Assassins, Ra's considers Bane a potential heir to his empire instead of Batman and wants his daughter to marry him. Talia later rejects the brute, regarding him as merely a cunning animal compared to the more cultured intelligence of his predecessor. After Batman defeats Bane in the Legacy comic series (1996), Ra's agrees that Bane was unworthy of his daughter (Detective Comics #701 and Robin #33), and calls off their engagement. Following Legacy, Bane has a nightmare in Batman: Bane (1997) of Talia (presumed to be deceased) betraying him and stabbing him and then embracing Batman. In Birds of Prey #26 (2001), written by Dixon, Bane continues to express his obsession with Talia. At the end of the story, Talia is pleased with the supposed death of Bane in one of her father's underground sanctums.

=== LexCorp ===
The Talia character was written to begin a new phase of her life near the turn of the century. Talia, disillusioned with her father and his plans and using the name Talia Head for herself, leaves him to run LexCorp as its new CEO when Lex Luthor becomes President of the United States. Although she seemingly supports Luthor, she secretly works to undermine him, anonymously leaking news of his underhanded dealings to Superman. Following Luthor's downfall, Talia sells all of LexCorp's assets to the Wayne Foundation, leaving Luthor penniless and his crimes exposed.

=== Death and the Maidens ===
In Batman: Death and the Maidens (2003) written by Greg Rucka, it is revealed that Ra's al Ghul met a woman by whom he had a daughter named Nyssa during his travels in Russia in the 20th century. Ra's abandons Nyssa at a crucial time: she is tortured, her entire family is killed in a concentration camp during the Holocaust, and she is rendered sterile when Nazi doctors pour acid into her uterus. Seeking vengeance, Nyssa plans to use her considerable wealth and resources to kill Ra's by befriending, kidnapping, and brainwashing Talia, turning her into a weapon to kill their father. To this end, she captures Talia and kills and resurrects her in rapid succession in a Lazarus Pit, leaving Talia virtually broken from the trauma of dying again and again in so short a time as Nyssa asks Talia why her father is 'letting' this happen to her. Rendered apathetic by her time in the camp, unable to feel anything, Nyssa also plans to assassinate Superman with kryptonite bullets she stole from the Batcave, hoping that, by uniting the world in one moment of tragedy, she would manage to rouse herself once more.

While Batman is successful in preventing the assassination of Superman, he is unable to stop Nyssa from killing Ra's. This, in turn, is actually part of a greater plan concocted by Ra's, who wants to ensure that his daughters would accept their destinies as his heirs and take up his genocidal campaign. Realizing and accepting this, Nyssa and Talia become the heads of The Demon, with Talia disavowing her love for Bruce Wayne as another result of her torture at Nyssa's hands (both sisters then consider Batman to be their enemy). Talia from then on became more often Batman's enemy than an ally.

=== The Society ===
In Countdown to Infinite Crisis, it is revealed that Talia is one of the core members of the Secret Society of Super Villains. This is revealed to be part of one of half-sister Nyssa's plans to take over the planet and bring about world peace and equality. After Nyssa is killed by Cassandra Cain, Talia assumes leadership of the League.

=== Under the Hood and Red Hood: The Lost Days ===
During the "Death in the Family" (1988) storyline, Jason Todd, the second Robin, is murdered by the Joker in Ethiopia. He was later revived as a character, and in Under the Hood (2005), he is discovered by the League of Assassins. In "Lost Days", out of her love for Batman, Talia takes Jason to her father and Jason spends months in the care of the League of Assassins. Although his body recuperates, Jason's mind is shattered. Seeing no other way to help him, Talia takes Jason down to the Lazarus Pit and throws his body in while her father regenerates himself. Jason is fully revived in the body and mind. Immediately afterward, to spare Jason her father's wrath, she aids the boy's escape. Livid at the fact that Batman failed to avenge his (Jason's) death by killing the Joker and that Batman had done nothing more than imprison him again, Jason pursues his own brand of justice. To stall him from killing Batman, Talia agrees to finance Jason and aid him in his training, so that he can then become the second Red Hood. She later accomplishes this by seducing Jason in an attempt to turn him against Batman.

In September 2011, The New 52 rebooted DC's continuity. In this new timeline, Talia had Jason train under a secret cult of warrior monks called the All Caste.

=== Batman and Son ===
The concept of Talia and Batman having a child from Son of the Demon is reinterpreted into continuity in the story Batman and Son (2006), written by Grant Morrison. Damian Wayne is a product of sexual assault of Batman by Talia and was raised in the League of Assassins.

=== R.I.P. and Final Crisis ===
During the Batman R.I.P. storyline, Talia and Damian become aware of the Black Glove's plot against Batman and save Commissioner James Gordon from being killed by the Black Glove. Talia and Gordon are informed that Batman went missing following a battle with Simon Hurt. Batman survives, only to be captured by Darkseid and apparently killed. Following Batman's apparent death, Talia leaves Damian in the hands of his adoptive brother Dick Grayson, who later takes on the role of Batman with Damian as Robin.

Following an operation in which Damian's spine is replaced, it is revealed that Talia inserted an implant into his spine that allows her or anyone she chooses, including Deathstroke, to control Damian's body remotely. She intends to use this device to force Damian to kill Dick Grayson, whom she perceives as holding her son back from his potential. After Grayson frees Damian, Talia reveals to her son that she has begun cloning him after realizing that the Boy Wonder has completely sided with his father's circle during their confrontation. She is too much of a perfectionist to love her son after he has defied her in such a manner, and is no longer welcome in the House of al Ghul.

=== The New 52 ===
In 2011, "The New 52" rebooted the DC universe. In Batman Incorporated, written by Grant Morrison, Talia is revealed to be the mastermind behind the Leviathan, a shadowy organization formed to oppose Bruce's "Batman Incorporated" project. She places a bounty of US$500 million on Damian's head, and declares war on Batman. In Batman Incorporated Vol. 2, #2 (2012), a Talia origin issue, she puts her father, Ra's al Ghul, under house arrest for opposing her plan and takes his men away with her. She claims to Batman that her agents have infiltrated all of Gotham's infrastructure and that she is providing the poor with purpose by arming them and giving them slogans to chant, as well as an enemy to fight. Talia says Batman must choose between saving Gotham from suicide or saving their son Damian from a death sentence. Her clone of Damian, known as Heretic, kills Damian.

After Heretic loses his final confrontation with Batman, Talia kills him, destroys Wayne Tower, and challenges Batman to a duel to the death in the Batcave. There, Talia poisons Batman. He embraces and kisses her mid-battle, not knowing that her lips were covered with poison, and he apologizes for not being able to love her the way she wants and admits defeat. Talia asks Batman to beg for the antidote but he does not respond. Jason Todd arrives at the Batcave and offers Talia the Oroboro trigger, a device that would trigger the destruction of seven cities and that she claims would provide a new source of energy for the world. When she attempts to activate the device, Jason reveals that he has double-crossed her and that the weapons the device would trigger had already been disarmed. Talia is then shot and killed by Kathy Kane. After she is buried, Talia's body disappears from the gravesite along with Damian's body.

Following Damian's resurrection, Talia emerges on Nanda Parbat with amnesia. Later, Talia is approached by a shadowy figure; she is able to recognize the robed figure and feared that a faction known as the Lu'un Darga is upon release, she is then knocked unconscious. The robed figure restores Talia's memory and attempts to influence her as a servant, but Talia resists his control and knocks him unconscious. She tries to escape the Lu'un Darga's unknown lair of the inner core with the heart of the Lazarus Pit.

During their battle, Talia tries, unsuccessfully, to convince Damian that Ra's and his al Ghul family wage war against the ancient immortals of the Lu'un Darga, claiming to be guardians of the Lazarus Pit. While Ra's sought to bring power and balance of life to Earth, the Lu'un Darga then tried to take back all life and cleanse Earth entirely, because they would bring their own destruction to Earth and the heart of the Lazarus Pit. Talia also tells him he is being used as a pawn by Ra's to steal the Lu'un Darga's power. The mysterious robed figure was revealed to be Den Darga, who thanked Damian for inadvertently bringing the relic and attempts to bring about the end of life on Earth.

While Den Darga destroys al Ghul Island by sinking it, he attempts to cleanse Talia and Damian's souls. However, his clones protect Damian and sacrifice themselves to save his life. Den Darga flees, leaving Talia and Damian to the abyss; where they were rescued by Damian's friends. Afterward, Talia is hopeful that she and Damian can move to a safe place and tells her unconscious son to rest. When Damian wakes, Talia convinces her son to calm down. She explains that she had been finding redemption for herself, for her retribution against him and inaction after Den Darga's attack. She informs him that if he chooses vigilantism, it will corrupt him. Talia goes on to say that he, too, can choose between staying or leaving, after accepting who he is, except that his mother has been reforming herself and regrets her choices. As he chooses to leave and says goodbye to his mother, Talia rejoins the League of Assassins to prepare for war against Den Darga and the Lu'un Darga.

Talia, along with Batman, show up again later in the title to aid their son in saving all life on Earth from the threat of Den and the Lu'un Darga. They are portrayed as a bickering couple but also put things aside to help. Their mission is a success though Damian ends up giving his life to save humanity. He is later brought back to life by Suren Darga. With the world saved, and satisfied her son is safe, she goes to rejoin the League of Assassins.

=== DC Rebirth ===
During DC Rebirth, Talia al Ghul shows up for her son, Damian Wayne's birthday and warns him of Ra's al Ghul's plot to send the Demon's Fist against Damian and the Teen Titans in a plan to assassinate them to prove their worth to the Demon's Head. These targets will later become Damian's Teen Titans teammates after he saves them and makes them aware of the Fist and their plans.

==== Shadow War ====
After a change of heart watching Talia and Damian lead a life without killing, a reformed Ra's al Ghul decides to atone for his crimes by turning himself to authorities and revealing his secrets publicly, garnering the attention of both the superhero and villain community. While delivering a press conference, however, Ra's is shot dead by a sniper resembling Deathstroke and is turned to ash to ensure he could not be resurrected. Angered at the turn of events, Talia gathers the League of Shadows and puts a hit on Deathstroke and his iteration Secret Society of Super-Villains in retaliation. The feud between the League of Shadows and the Secret Society of Super-Villains concludes after a one-on-one battle ends with Talia killing Deathstroke but the imposter reveals himself to be Geo-Force, who plotted the war in hope of having both Slade and Talia killing each other. Damian and Bruce arrive shortly soon and help Talia defeat Geo-Force, with Damian managing to convince his mother to not kill Geo-Force afterward because his grandfather believed that their family be better.

== Skills and abilities ==
Talia was trained by the League of Assassins as a martial artist and assassin. She is knowledgeable in subjects including chemistry and equestrianism, and holds advanced degrees in biology and engineering, as well as an MBA. She has extensive connections to terrorist and spy networks and acts as a leader, spymaster, tactician, and strategist. She is portrayed as concealing her abilities so that opponents will underestimate her.

== Other versions ==
- An alternate universe version of Talia al Ghul appears in Batman: Brotherhood of the Bat. This version secretly raised her and Batman's son, Tallant, following Batman's death.
- An alternate universe version of Talia al Ghul appears in Superman & Batman: Generations. This version led the League of Assassins with Bruce Wayne after he used a Lazarus Pit in 1979 to rejuvenate his youth.
- An alternate universe version of Talia al Ghul appears in Elseworld's Finest. This version pursued a relationship with Clark Kent.
- An alternate universe version of Talia al Ghul appears in Batman: The Doom That Came to Gotham. This version is a member of a cult that worships a demon called Iog-Sothra, who later kills her.
- An alternate universe version of Talia al Ghul appears in Absolute Superman. This version acted as Omega Prime, leader of a group of freedom fighters called the Omega Men who ostensibly acts against her father Ra's al Ghul and his company, the Lazarus Corporation, while secretly furthering his agenda before eventually revealing her true allegiance.

== Reception ==
IGN's list of the Top 100 Comic Book Villains of All Time List ranked Talia as #42. She was ranked 25th in Comics Buyer's Guide's "100 Sexiest Women in Comics" list.

== Collected editions ==
Title	Material collected	Publication date	ISBN
Batman Arkham: Talia al Ghul	Detective Comics #411, Batman #232, Batman: Son of the Demon, President Luthor Secret Files and Origins #1, Batman: Death and the Maidens #9, Red Hood: The Lost Days #1, Batman #656, Batman and Robin #12, Batman Incorporated Vol. 2 #2, and #13, Batman Vol 3 #34-35	March 2021	978-1779512949

== In other media ==
=== Television ===
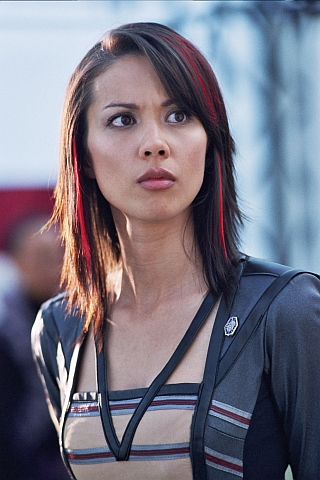
Lexa Doig portrays Talia in Arrow

- Talia al Ghul appears in series set in the DC Animated Universe (DCAU), voiced initially by Helen Slater and later by Olivia Hussey.
- Talia al Ghul appears in Batman: The Brave and the Bold, voiced by Andrea Bowen.
- Talia al Ghul appears in Young Justice, voiced by Zehra Fazal.
- A young Talia al Ghul appears in the Legends of Tomorrow episode "Left Behind", portrayed by Milli Wilkinson.
- Talia al Ghul appears in Arrow, portrayed by Lexa Doig.
- Talia al Ghul appears in Harley Quinn, voiced by Aline Elasmar. This version was appointed as a higher-up at Wayne Enterprises during her relationship with Bruce Wayne and replaces him as CEO after he is arrested.

=== Film ===
- George Miller expressed interest in casting Teresa Palmer as Talia al Ghul in the planned film Justice League: Mortal before the project was canceled.
- Talia al Ghul appears in The Dark Knight Rises, portrayed by Marion Cotillard as an adult and Joey King as a child.
- Talia al Ghul makes a non-speaking cameo appearance in a flashback in Batman: Under the Red Hood.
- Talia al Ghul appears in films set in the DC Animated Movie Universe (DCAMU), voiced by Morena Baccarin.
- Talia al Ghul makes a non-speaking cameo appearance in Batman vs. Teenage Mutant Ninja Turtles.
- Talia al Ghul appears in Batman: Death in the Family, voiced again by Zehra Fazal.
- Talia al Ghul appears in Catwoman: Hunted, voiced again by Zehra Fazal.
- The Batman: The Doom That Came to Gotham incarnation of Talia al Ghul appears in the film adaptation, voiced by Emily O'Brien.

=== Video games ===
- Talia al Ghul appears in Batman: Dark Tomorrow, voiced by Wendy Jones.
- Talia al Ghul appears in DC Universe Online, voiced by Ellie McBride.
- Talia al Ghul appears as a playable character in Lego Batman: The Videogame.
- Talia al Ghul appears in Batman: Arkham City, voiced by Stana Katic. This version is the head of Ra's al Ghul's squad of elite female assassins.
- Talia al Ghul appears as a playable character in Lego Batman 2: DC Super Heroes.
- Talia al Ghul, based on Marion Cotillard's portrayal, appears in The Dark Knight Rises tie-in game, voiced by Eileen Stevens.
- Talia al Ghul appears as a support card in the mobile versions of Injustice: Gods Among Us.
- Talia al Ghul appears in Gotham Knights, voiced by Emily O'Brien. This version took over leadership of the League of Shadows following Batman and Ra's deaths and incinerated the latter's corpse to prevent his resurrection.
- Talia al Ghul appears as a playable character and the final boss in Lego Batman: Legacy of the Dark Knight, voiced by Vanessa Labrie.

=== Miscellaneous ===
- Talia al Ghul appears in the Young Justice tie-in comic book series.
- Talia al Ghul appears in Batman '66 Meets Wonder Woman '77.
