= Leviathan (DC Comics) =

Fictional crime organization in DC Comics

Publication information
- Publisher: DC Comics
- First appearance: Batman: The Return #1 (January 2011)
- Created by: Grant Morrison (writer); David Finch (artist)

In-story information
- Type of organization: Organized crime, terrorist
- Leader(s): Talia al Ghul, formerly Leviathan (Mark Shaw)
- Agent(s): Dr. Dedalus (Otto Netz); Heretic (Fatherless); Professor Pyg; Son of Pyg; Goatboy; The Silencer

Leviathan is a fictional criminal organization appearing in American comic books published by DC Comics, later revealed to be a schism of the League of Assassins under the leadership of Talia al Ghul, the daughter of Ra's al Ghul.

The organization appears in a different form in the fourth season finale and fifth season of Supergirl.

== Publication history ==
Leviathan was introduced in Batman: The Return (Jan. 2011) and was created by Grant Morrison and David Finch.

== Fictional team history ==
=== First incarnation ===
Leviathan is an organization founded by Talia al Ghul upon leaving her father, Ra's al Ghul's League of Assassins. Leviathan's liturgy is staunchly anti-capitalist and seeks to dismantle society and impose itself as the leader of a new way.

Leviathan first became known to the heroes of Earth as a terror group who kidnapped the child of a Yemeni sheik. However, Batman discovered that Leviathan was working with the sheik and was planning to attack the world with mind-controlled children and engineered metahumans.

Batman connects the organization to an apocalyptic vision he had received and positions Batman Incorporated to oppose them. After some moves, Leviathan seemed to form up behind Doctor Dedalus, a Nazi master spy imprisoned on the Falkland Islands, with a predicted lifespan of months due to Alzheimer's disease. In the aftermath of Dedalus' breakout, further investigation revealed that Leviathan was recruiting child soldiers from the country Mtamba.

Talia soon tells Batman that her creation of Leviathan has been all out of spite. As revenge for denying her his love and unwavering dedication to his crusade for justice, Talia created Leviathan as an antithesis of Batman Incorporated. Heretic is eventually shown to be the eponymous "Leviathan" of the organization, the "Third Batman" that is prophesied to send Gotham City into chaos and destroy it. However, Heretic continuously fails Talia and proves himself to be just as defiant as his genetic template, Damian Wayne. After killing Heretic, Talia attempts to activate a "death ring" around the planet, established by worldwide Leviathan agents. Batman Incorporated disables the weapon, and Talia is killed by Kathy Kane. Spyral takes over Leviathan's resources.

"And so we wait, patiently. Our tendrils spreading, unchecked, uncontrolled, unseen. Our hatred vaster than empires, and more slow. Our name, Leviathan!"

— The Leviathan Oath from Batman: The Return #1 (January 2011)

=== Second incarnation ===
In continuity following DC Rebirth, Leviathan was founded by Doctor Dedalus alongside Spyral. Professor Netz knew after the Second World War, that the only real enemy of mankind would be man himself and upon the somber realization that he would not live forever, he opted to fabricate the twin clandestine operations, each one working the specified fields aligned with their own moral factors and professions; his way of ensuring his own immortality even after his death. Sometime after, Netz faded into the shadows as Spyral's mysterious director. Talia al Ghul came to commandeer the Leviathan organization for her own purposes.

After Talia's death, Leviathan fractures into various factions, guided by competing leaders. Talia is later taken to a Lazarus Pit in Khadym by her loyalists, resurrecting her. Talia regains control of Leviathan after revealing that she staged the conflict for the sake of thinning and reinforcing its clientele due to their inherent greedy and belligerent nature having debilitated it before.

Mark Shaw eventually acquired control of the organization and offered Talia a partnership alongside him. She instead decided to kidnap Clark Kent in order to lure Superman into rescuing him and taking Leviathan down. Shaw however was aware of her plan and freed Kent. Shaw later threw Talia out from his ship for betraying him but she was rescued by Superman, whose x-ray vision failed to see through Shaw's mask.

Shaw takes out several clandestine organizations such as the D.E.O., A.R.G.U.S., Checkmate, and Spyral. While it was initially believed that the buildings and personnel had been destroyed, it was later learned that Leviathan had a new form of teleportation technology that relocated the buildings and their occupants and had recruited many of the agencies' personnel while brainwashing others who were deemed necessary to Leviathan's success.

Superman confronts Leviathan in Cuba, but their battle is interrupted by a space-time energy cascade. Leviathan has Superman transported to their location in Chicago and tries to convince him to join him, revealing how Spyral had developed technology to take his son Jon down and promised to fix the "broken world".

== Membership ==
- Mark Shaw - Head of Leviathan, formerly Manhunter.
- Talia al Ghul - The former head of Leviathan.
- Professor Pyg - Lazlo Valentin at first appears to be working for Simon Hurt, but is later revealed that he is actually working for Talia al Ghul.
- Heretic - A mysterious agent of Leviathan who wears a bat-like costume. Heretic is later revealed to be a clone of Damian Wayne who was artificially accelerated to adulthood. Talia al Ghul kills him and blows up his body along with Wayne Tower.
- Son of Pyg - Son of Professor Pyg, real name Janosz Valentin a.k.a. Johnny Valentine.
- Dr. Dedalus (Otto Netz) - A former Nazi scientist, the founder of Leviathan and Spyral, and the biological father of Kathy Kane. He is later killed by Damian Wayne.
- Goatboy - A Gotham City-bred taxi driver-turned-assassin in light of Talia's billion dollar bounty on Damian. He is later killed by Lumina Lux.
- The Silencer - Honor Guest was Talia al Ghul's best cleaner in the underlife, but she left her service behind pursuing normalcy as a housewife.
- Quietus - A Leviathan underboss. Specializes in biomechanical physiology modifications and heads the technologies department.
- Wishbone - The head of the magical division of Leviathan.
- Gunn - A Leviathan underboss. He is killed while fighting Quietus and Silencer in Khadym.
- Jonah 9 - A Leviathan underboss and the head of their eugenics and genetics division.
- Mad Dog - A bounty hunter.
- Raze - A Leviathan super killer begotten of a eugenics experiment using Ra's hereditary code only to be taken in and indoctrinated by Talia much like Silencer was. He is killed by one of his test tube siblings, Smoke.
- Rutger Orestes - A Leviathan underboss who was murdered.

== In other media ==
- Leviathan appears in Supergirl, initially led by Rama Khan before Gamemnae takes over, as well as Tezumak and Sela, and consisting of Margot Morrison (portrayed by Patti Allan), an unnamed elderly human man (portrayed by Duncan Fraser), Eve Teschmacher, Breathtaker, Rip Roar, and Andrea Rojas / Acrata. This version of the group is a secret organization and alliance of between humanity and aliens from Jarhanpur. They seek to manipulate human society, typically using Jarhanpuran technology and cosmetic modification.
- Leviathan appears in Catwoman: Hunted, secretly led by Talia al Ghul, with Cheetah as a figurehead, and consisting of Tobias Whale, Mr. Yakuza, Dr. Tzin Zaho Tzin, La Dama, Moxie Mannheim, and Black Mask. This version of the group is a global crime syndicate with ties to Japanese, Chinese, and Central American cartels as well as Intergang.
