= Dava (comics) =

Fictional character in the DC Comics universe

- Dava, art by Staz Johnson.

Publication information
- Publisher: DC Comics
- First appearance: Robin (vol. 2) #49 (1998)
- Created by: Staz Johnson; Chuck Dixon

In-story information
- Alter ego: Dava Sbörsc
- Team affiliations: Transbelvian army
- Abilities: Superspeed and superstrength upon ingestion of Aramilla; skilled martial artist/acrobat

Dava (Dava Sbörsc) is a fictional character in the DC Comics universe. She is a martial artist created by writer Chuck Dixon and artist Staz Johnson, and she first appeared in Robin (vol. 2) #49 (1998).

== Fictional character biography ==
Dava Sbörsc's homeland of Tbliska was left in ruins by a long and bloody civil war. The country was divided into two countries - Krasna-Volny and Transbelvia - with neither acknowledging the other as a legitimate country. When she was young, Dava joined the Transbelvian army and vowed to kill the worst killers in the Krasna-Volnian army. Being fast but small, Dava trained extensively in martial arts to overcome her opponents. While learning from the Iron Master, Dava encounters Tim Drake (Robin), who was also studying with the Master at the time. She greatly impresses Robin, defeating him in a sparring match with astonishing speed. Robin, in turn, impresses her when he skillfully takes down a thief seeking to take the dojo's texts.

After Lady Shiva kills the Iron Master in combat, Dava returns to her homeland, where Edmund Dorrance is supplying the Krasna-Volnian army with weapons to wipe out Transbelvia. Wishing to protect Dava from Shiva, Robin is forced to accompany Dava in fighting Dvak Tvorakovich, a Krasna-Volvian general who had killed entire Transbelvian villages during the war. When the two confront Tvorakovich, Dava transfers some of her strength into Robin, allowing him to defeat the armed guards with ease.

Shiva arrives and challenges Dava to a death match. Robin attempts to save Dava, but he underestimates his own strength and apparently kills Shiva. Dorrance arrives with more Kransa-Volvian troops, seeking to avenge his earlier losses at Robin's hands. Robin resuscitates Shiva, who quickly kills Dorrance's troops, while General Tvorakovich is killed in an explosion he had intended for Dorrance.
