= DC Universe Online =

2011 video game

- Developer: Dimensional Ink Games
- Publishers: Sony Online Entertainment; Daybreak Game Company; Warner Bros. Interactive Entertainment
- Director: S.J. Mueller
- Writer: Geoff Johns
- Composers: Gerard Marino; Chad Mossholder
- Engine: Unreal Engine 3
- Platforms: Microsoft Windows; Nintendo Switch; PlayStation 3 (discontinued); PlayStation 4 PlayStation 5 Xbox One; Xbox Series X/S
- Release: Microsoft Windows, PlayStation 3 January 11, 2011; PlayStation 4 November 15, 2013; Xbox One; April 29, 2016; Nintendo Switch; August 6, 2019; PlayStation 5 March 26, 2024; Xbox Series X/S; October 23, 2024
- Genres: Massively multiplayer online, action
- Mode: Multiplayer

DC Universe Online (DCUO) is a free-to-play massively multiplayer online game (MMO) set in the fictional universe of DC Comics. Developed by Dimensional Ink Games and co-published by Daybreak Game Company and WB Games, the game was initially released in January 2011 for Windows and PlayStation 3. It was later released in November 2013 for PlayStation 4, April 2016 for Xbox One, August 2019 for Nintendo Switch, March 2024 for PlayStation 5, and October 2024 for Xbox Series X/S.

== Gameplay ==
The player creates a new, original character who interacts with the iconic heroes and villains of DC Comics. Players choose their character's morality (Hero or Villain), mentor (Batman, Joker, Superman, Lex Luthor, Wonder Woman, or Circe) gender (male or female), body type (short, medium, tall, spry, athletic, large), personality (comical, flirty, powerful, primal, serious), movement mode (flight, acrobatics, speed or skimming), weapon, and power (fire, ice, gadgets, mental, nature, sorcery, earth, light, electricity, rage, quantum, celestial, munitions, atomic, water). Numerous hair, skin, and costume types are available, and up to 4 colors can be applied to the color scheme palette. Pre-built templates, inspired by some key DC characters, are available to expedite the character creation process.

When the player's character is created, they are thrown into the world of DC Universe Online, with the first experience having to fight their way out of a Brainiac spaceship. The tutorial teaches basic movement and abilities, combat, counter mechanics, and using power and skill points. After escaping, the player is transported to Gotham or Metropolis and tasked with missions that often involve defeating enemies, retrieving collectibles, and defending NPCs. Eventually, the player's character is made an official member of the Justice League (heroes) or The Society (villains), where they continue on their missions to increase their level and skill in various content. Daybreak Game Company is working to make DC Universe Online more interactive than standard MMO games, while trying to keep their key elements which include a leveling system, raid instances, endgame progression and inventories. The world is mainly a shared, public space. The public space features dynamically generated content designed for both hero and villain player characters to progress and fight alongside and against a multitude of iconic DC Comics characters, moving forward with stories, many of which come from the pages of DC's own comic books.

DC Universe Online has been actively updating through Game Updates (GU) and Hotfixes. Aside from bug fixes, several Game Updates involve Seasonal Events which provide special feats, styles, base items, overworld missions and instances exclusive to the time frame for which it runs, usually a month. There are three Events that tend to cycle throughout the year: Survival Mode, Legends PvE, and Stabilizer Fragment Instances. DC Universe Online offers downloadable content (DLC) called Episodes, which expand the game universe with new, more difficult missions to progress that provide new stories or continuations of existing stories, new costume styles, and new equipment.

== Plot ==
The opening cinematic takes place in a war-torn future depicting a final battle between the world's greatest heroes and villains. A future version of Lex Luthor provides voice-over narration. This battle takes place in the ruins of Metropolis. Luthor, wearing a heavy mech armor, commands an army of super-villains that includes Joker, Harley Quinn, Circe, Deathstroke, Black Adam, Giganta, Metallo and Poison Ivy. A scarred, armored Batman commands the heroes, which includes Cyborg, Flash, Green Lantern, Wonder Woman and Green Arrow. Both Poison Ivy and Green Arrow are shown dead at the beginning of the cut scene. The battle culminates with the death of Wonder Woman at Luthor's hands, at which point Superman hears her screams from orbit and flies to Earth to confront him. As Superman cradles Wonder Woman's dead body, he collapses to the ground and it is revealed that Luthor hid kryptonite pellets in her mouth as a trap. Luthor impales Superman with a kryptonite-tipped spear, and stands back to proclaim his victory only to see Brainiac's war fleet fill the skies.

The scene then shifts to the present-day Watchtower, where the future Luthor, modified with Brainiac technology, is telling the story to the present-day Superman, Batman, and Wonder Woman. Future Luthor explains that the war between the heroes and villains was triggered by the manipulations of Brainiac, who had been downloading their powers over time. With the planet's most powerful beings dead, Brainiac intended to use the pirated data to create an army of metahumans under his control, facilitating his conquest of Earth. As the sole survivor of the war, Luthor could do nothing to resist Brainiac's subjugation of the planet. Luthor explains that he was able to survive in secret and steal the stolen data and energy from Brainiac's mothership in the form of "exobytes" (nanobot-sized devices that can bond to a living host and give them superpowers). Luthor has traveled into his past to release the exobytes into the atmosphere of present-day Earth. The heroes are outraged, but Luthor explains that thousands of new metahumans will be created (becoming the player-characters of the game). He implores the Justice League to find and train these new metahumans, because Brainiac is coming and the Earth must be ready to succeed where it was once doomed to fail.

When this cinematic ends, the player is brought to the character creation menu to build their new Hero or Villain.

In the second trailer to the game "In Lex we Trust", it is revealed that Luthor's description of events leading up to his arrival in the present time is not as he described to the heroes. The trailer begins with Luthor reviving his companion Fracture from being unconscious. Luthor explains that Brainiac's forces have already penetrated the Fortress of Solitude and that their time is running out. As they approach a time portal chamber, a Brainiac Eradicator attacks and Fracture destroys the robotic drone with a small grenade. The two arrive at the portal which is being stabilized by Batman (whose face is disfigured and arm is replaced by a robotic prosthetic due to injuries from the battle of villains and heroes). As more Eradicators enter the chamber, Luthor lies saying his armor is damaged and that he can not hold them off. Batman tells Fracture to take the canister that contains millions of exobytes and go through the portal, while attacking the Eradicators in order to buy him more time. Fracture thanks Luthor for using the exobytes to give him his powers. Seeing the opportunity he had been waiting for, Luthor kills Fracture describing him as "an excellent lab rat." Before Luthor steps into the portal, Batman calls to Luthor warning that "I'll be coming for you" to which Luthor responds "No, you won't" and activates a self-destruct sequence. Luthor enters the portal and the Fortress of Solitude suffers massive explosions. He arrives in a dark alley, presumably present day. He is greeted by his present-day self who describes him as being late.

At the end of "The Prime Battleground" raid, the present and future versions of Lex Luthor worked together to steal Brainiac's power. Luthor is then betrayed by Future Luthor, wanting the power for himself. It is then revealed Future Batman survived the explosion at the Fortress of Solitude and chased Future Luthor through time. Future Luthor escapes and Future Batman follows him. In the following cut-scene, Future Batman is said to be the last hope for humanity.

Following these events, the heroes led by Future Batman and villains led by Future Luthor to the "Nexus of Reality" (the center of the Multiverse itself) both fight for control, using paradoxes from constant time-travels to alter the histories of iconic characters, forcing heroes and villains to work parallel to each other, changing the timelines in the same fashion. What one causes, the other reverts, thus making an infinite cycle. This results in a massive paradox creature that consumes time itself. In the raid, players must stop the creature from destroying the time-space continuum (one of the many raids where both villains and heroes have the same goal). This event partially ends the storyline the game was based upon, yet opens the possibility to enter many new realities.

Since then, there have been certain stories tied in reflecting the Arrowverse, with the introduction of Nanda Parbat, fighting alongside characters featured in Legends of Tomorrow, and a Supergirl Costume Legends character. Content from the DC Extended Universe has also been released. Other comic centered storylines feature "Sons of Trigon", "Blackest Night", "Amazon Fury", "Halls of Power", "Bombshells Paradox", "Bottle City of Kandor", "Harley Quinn", "Earth 3", "Teen Titans: The Judas Contract", "Justice League Dark", "Dark Nights: Metal" and Birds of Prey in Episodes.

== Development ==
North American Windows edition

Concept art for the game was released on July 4, 2008, and the first trailer was released on July 14, 2008. Sony Online Entertainment's goal was to make a different kind of MMO game, with The Incredible Hulk: Ultimate Destruction cited as one of the main inspirations for gameplay.

A beta was available from December 14, 2010, until January 5, 2011. There were a number of technical issues that came to light when the beta was closed, which were partially resolved by the game's release. EverQuest developers Chris Cao and Shawn Lord were involved. Chris Cao was the game director up to May 2011, since stepped down to be replaced by Mark Anderson, previously the art director. Mark Anderson has since been replaced by Jens Andersen, who was promoted to executive creative director of Daybreak Game Company with S.J. Mueller creative director. Comic artists Alé Garza, Carlos D'Anda, JJ Kirby, Oliver Nome, Eddie Nuñez, Livio Ramondelli, and Michael Lopez also contributed to the leveling content headlines and cutscenes. In August 2011, there was a global server merge implemented by the developers to consolidate all PC servers and PlayStation 3 servers into 4 individual servers, one for each platform per region. On September 19, 2011, it was announced that the game would go free-to-play on November 1, 2011, along with the addition of microtransactions. In mid-2013, as part of a hosting deal, accounts for the European PC version were sold to ProSiebenSat.1, however they were still capable of using the US servers. DC Universe Online was announced for the PlayStation 4 on June 5, 2013, along with PlanetSide 2, and was released November 15, 2013. After Sony Online Entertainment (SOE), had announced their All Access Membership changes, SOE and ProSiebenSat.1 parted ways, returning the accounts to SOE. All accounts are managed by Daybreak Game Company.

During the fifth anniversary livestream on January 11, 2016, it was announced that the two regional servers, US and EU would receive cross play, with players on PC able to play with players on the PlayStation version on the same server, only divided by region. An Xbox One version of the game was also announced on January 11, 2016, for release on April 29 of the same year, which launched on two separate regional servers that have since been consolidated into one XB server, not connected to the PC or PS versions of the game. On February 5, both USPC USPS servers were merged into one US server and EUPC and EUPS were merged into one EU server. The same restrictions of not being able to log into or transfer a PS account on PC and vice versa has been maintained.

On October 30, 2017, Daybreak Game Company stated the PlayStation 3 version would shut down on January 31, 2018, to focus on providing a better experience on the PlayStation 4. Utilizing the same PSN, a PlayStation 3 player can access their account on PlayStation 4.

On May 23, 2019, a Nintendo Switch version of the game was announced, set for Summer 2019, and has since released two separate regional USNS and EUNS servers on August 6, 2019.

On January 21, 2020, it was announced that the Daybreak Austin Studio that has developed the game since its conception would become their own studio, Dimensional Ink Games, that will continue developing DC Universe Online and a new high-profile next-generation action MMORPG, with Daybreak Games Company now acting in a publisher role.

DC Universe Online was Arleen Sorkin's final performance, before her death on August 24, 2023.

=== Episodes ===
DC Universe Online has received a variety of episodic content since its release. These episodes were originally available to members who have an active subscription or cost a fee for non-members, however since the House of Legends Episode in August 2021, all episodes are freely accessible. Many of the episodes required users to have completed certain achievements or complete game progression elements to access the content. Future story content packs are to be rebranded as "Chapters", with Chapter 1 - Light & Rain "Day of Reckoning" released on 28 January 2025. Light & Rain "Fearful Day" released on May 28, 2025. Light & Rain "Raging Night" released on September 23, 2025. Chapter 4 is expected to launch 1st quarter of 2026.

==== Episode 1: Fight for the Light ====
"Fight for the Light" released on September 6, 2011. It revolves around the conflict between the Green Lantern Corps and the Sinestro Corps. This episode introduced the new Controller powerset "Light", based on the Green Lanterns and Sinestro Corps, for heroes and villains respectively.

==== Episode 2: Lightning Strikes ====
"Lightning Strikes" released on December 6, 2011. This episode stars the Flash and the Rogues. It introduces Central City and the Healer power "Electricity".

==== Episode 3: The Battle for Earth ====
"Battle for Earth" released on March 13, 2012. This episode continues the main storyline and the conflict against Brainiac. In addition, the new Tank power, "Earth" was introduced.

==== Episode 4: The Last Laugh ====
"The Last Laugh" was released on June 19, 2012. This episode focuses on the Joker as he gains access to hero and villain safe houses to stir up additional controversy between the player factions. Arleen Sorkin reprised her role as Harley Quinn from the DC Animated Universe, her final role before her retirement..

==== Episode 5: Hand of Fate ====
"Hand of Fate" was released on August 14, 2012. This episode revolves around Doctor Fate and the mystical side of the DC universe.

==== Episode 6: Home Turf ====
"Home Turf" was released on January 29, 2013. This episode includes two daily Tier 4 hero missions, two daily Tier 4 villain missions, and daily Tier 4 Bounties.

==== Episode 7: Origin Crisis ====
"Origin Crisis" was released on May 8, 2013. It continues the story from "The Battle for Earth" episode as players travel through time to fight for control of space and time. "Origin Crisis" introduces the Controller power Quantum, which allows players to control time and space.

==== Episode 8: Sons of Trigon ====
"Sons of Trigon" was released on August 29, 2013, for subscribers, and September 3, 2013, for players without an active subscription. This episode focuses on the demon Trigon as he takes over an alternate Gotham City. This episode features Trigon's daughter Raven and the "Celestial" Healer power.

==== Episode 9: War of the Light Part I ====
"War of the Light Part I" was released on January 22, 2014. The episode revolves around the continuing battle between the Lantern Corps in Metropolis. "War of the Light" introduces the Tank power "Rage", which is based on the Red Lantern Corps.

==== Episode 10: Amazon Fury Part I ====
"Amazon Fury Part I" was released on April 30, 2014, for players with an active subscription, and May 6, 2014, for players without an active subscription. The episode focuses on the battle between Wonder Woman and her mother Hippolyta.

==== Episode 11: Halls of Power Part I ====
"Halls of Power Part I" was released on August 6, 2014. This episode revolves around the New Gods as they seek new ways to take control and engage in strategic battles on a cosmic level.

==== Episode 12: War of the Light Part II ====
"War of the Light Part II" was released on November 11, 2014, for players with an active subscription, and November 18, 2014, for players without an active subscription. The episode continues the story first started in "War of the Light Part I" and the battle between the Lantern Corps.

==== Episode 13: Amazon Fury Part II ====
"Amazon Fury Part II" released on February 3, 2015, for members and February 12, 2015 for non-members. The episode continues the story first started in Amazon Fury Part I as players battle Hippolyta.

==== Episode 14: Halls of Power Part II ====
"Halls of Power Part II" was released on May 12, 2015, for players with an active subscription, and May 19, 2015, for players without an active subscription. The episode continues the story first started in the Halls of Power Part I episode, as players continue their battle against the New Gods.

==== Episode 15: Bombshells Paradox & Corrupted Zamaron ====
"Bombshells Paradox & Corrupted Zamaron" released on August 5, 2015, for members and August 12, 2015 for non-members. This episode is based on the series DC Comics Bombshells and features an alternate universe around the time of World War II.

==== Episode 16: Desecrated Cathedral and Oa Under Siege ====
"Desecrated Cathedral and Oa Under Siege" was released on September 2, 2015, for members, and September 9, 2015 for non-members. The episode revolved around players defending Oa as it faces a new threat from the Black Lantern Corps, and a new storyline with Raven.

==== Episode 17: Unholy Matrimony & The Flash Museum Burglary ====
"Unholy Matrimony and The Flash Museum Burglary" was released on October 7, 2015, for members and October 14, 2015 for non-members, The episode continues the storyline involving the League of Assassins, which was established in "Bombshells Paradox".

==== Episode 18: The Demon's Pit and Blackest Day ====
"The Demon's Pit and Blackest Day" was released on November 4, 2015, for members, and November 11, 2015 for non-members. The episode finishes the War of the Light saga and continues the League of Assassins storyline.

==== Episode 19: The Demon's Plan and Deep Desires ====
"The Demon's Plan and Deep Desires" was released on December 2, 2015, for members and December 9, 2015 and non-members. The episode concludes the League of Assassins storyline and serves as an epilogue to "Unholy Matrimony".

==== Episode 20: Blackest Night & Wastelands Wonderland ====
"Blackest Night and Wastelands Wonderland" was released on January 6, 2016, for members with a subscription, and January 13, 2016, for players without an active subscription. The episode revolved around players fighting the Blackest Night and dealing with the fallout from the War of the Light saga.

==== Episode 21: Prison Break and The First Piece ====
"Prison Break and The First Piece" was released on February 4, 2016 for members, and February 10, 2016 for non-members. This episode revolves around a stranger who asks the player to go on a couple of adventures.

==== Episode 22: Science Spire and The Phantom Zone ====
"Science Spire and The Phantom Zone" was released on March 2, 2016, for members and March 9, 2016 for non-members. The episode revolved around dealing with Phantom Zone malfunctions and sightings of a mysterious figure near the Science Spire.

==== Episode 23: The Will of Darkseid and Brainiac's Bottle Ship ====
"The Will of Darkseid and Brainiac's Bottle Ship" was released on April 6, 2016, for members and April 13, 2016 for non-members. The episode revolved around dealing with prisoners who had escaped from the Phantom Zone and a potential new invasion from Darkseid's forces.

==== Episode 24: Harley's Heist and Darkseid's War Factory ====
"Harley's Heist and Darkseid's War Factory" was released on May 19, 2016. The episode stars Harley Quinn and continues the Darkseid storyline.

==== Episode 25: Iceberg Lounge and A Rip In Time ====
"Iceberg Lounge and A Rip In Time" was released on June 29, 2016. The episode features the Iceberg Lounge and a continuation of the mysterious figure players interacted with in the Episode 21 storyline.

==== Episode 26: Wayne Manor Gala and Kandor Central Tower ====
"Wayne Manor Gala and Kandor Central Tower" was released on July 27, 2016. The episode continues the Harley Quinn storyline started in Episode 24, and the Phantom Zone storyline started in Episode 22.

==== Episode 27: Amazon Fury: Part III ====
"Amazon Fury Part III", was released on November 17, 2016. The episode concludes the Amazon Fury storyline from Episodes 10 and 13.

==== Episode 28: Age of Justice ====
"Age of Justice" was released on May 31, 2017. The episode revolved around players traveling back through time to save a new impending threat.

==== Episode 29: Riddled With Crime ====
"Riddled With Crime" was released on September 20, 2017. The episode revolved around players dealing with a potential gang war brewing between the Riddler's crew and Joker's gang.

==== Episode 30: Earth 3 ====
"Earth 3" was released on November 15, 2017, and based on the comics saga "Crisis on Earth 2". The episode revolves around players fighting the villains from Earth-Three.

==== Episode 31: Deluge ====
"Deluge" was released on March 29, 2018. The episode revolved around dealing with a new invasion from Starro. Some of the core features of this include one Tier 9 1-Player Operation in Stemming the Tide, one Tier 9 Duo in Spreading Spores, one Tier 9 Alert in Invasion, two Tier 9 Raids in The Threat Below and Spindrift Station, along with new daily and weekly Tier 9 missions in Central City Starro Deluge Zone.

==== Celebration Episode: The Death of Superman ====
"The Death of Superman" was released in between Episode 31 and 32, highlighting Superman's 80th anniversary and the release of the thousandth issue of Action Comics. The episode's storyline was released in three parts with Part 1 being released on May 16, 2018, Part 2 on June 5, 2018, and Part 3 on June 27, 2018. The episode revolved the return of Superman villain Doomsday.

==== Episode 32: Teen Titans: The Judas Contract ====
Loosely based on the comics storyline "The Judas Contract", the thirty-second episode, Teen Titans: The Judas Contract, was released on July 18, 2018. The episode revolved around players interacting and working with the Teen Titans as they look for new recruits and face the betrayal of Terra. This episode features Teen Titans members Raven, Nightwing, Beast Boy, Cyborg, Starfire, Robin, Jericho, and Wonder Girl.

==== Episode 33: Atlantis ====
On November 8, 2018, the thirty-third episode, "Atlantis", was released. The episode's storyline revolves around players journeying to Atlantis to save the city and assist Aquaman in securing his power and seat on the throne.

==== Episode 34: Justice League Dark ====
The thirty-fourth episode, "Justice League Dark", was released on March 28, 2019. The episode's storyline revolved around players working with John Constantine and the other members of the Justice League Dark to find artifacts that will be useful in fighting back new demonic threats.

==== Episode 35: Metal Part I ====
On September 12, 2019, the thirty-fifth episode, "Metal Part I", was released. The episode's storyline revolved around players working with heroes and villains to search for Batman in order to fight against the Dark Knights, twisted amalgamated evil versions of Batman and other Justice League heroes or villains from the Dark Multiverse while also fighting a metal plague infecting the city.

==== Episode 36: Metal Part II ====
The thirty-sixth episode, Metal Part II, was released December 5, 2019. The episode's storyline revolves on completing the storyline set up in Metal Part I, with Barbatos appearing once the world has been brought into the Dark Multiverse, continuing the fight against new and returning Dark Knights, while aiding Batman, Hawkgirl and the rest of the Justice League to save Earth.

==== Episode 37: Birds of Prey ====
On April 16, 2020, the thirty-seventh episode, "Birds of Prey", was released. The episode's storyline revolved around players working with heroes and villains associated with the Birds of Prey and Superman to search for Lex Luthor after LexCorp Tower is supposedly attacked, leading into a search for what plans he has for the multiverse, while finding out he has only been aiding the Justice League in order to destroy them and attain source energy.

==== Episode 38: Wonderverse ====
The thirty-eighth episode, Wonderverse, was released July 30, 2020. The episode's storyline continues the storylines set up in Metal Part II, Birds of Prey, Bombshells Paradox, Amazon Fury and Halls of Power episodes with a Council of Wonder Women being formed by Nubia, consisting of Wonder Woman of the main continuity, Bombshells Wonder Woman, Flashpoint Wonder Woman and Red Son Wonder Woman, appearing together in order to stop the Olympian gods, such as Zeus, Hera, Athena and Ares and New Gods all fighting to acquire source shards to empower themselves.

==== Episode 39: Long Live The Legion ====
Episode thirty-nine was released on November 5, 2020. This episode is set in 31st-century Metropolis, featuring the Legion of Super-Heroes of the 31st century and the Teen Titans of the present day. Enemies in the episode include Mordru, the Fatal Five, and mind-controlled versions of the Legionnaires.

==== Episode 40: World Of Flashpoint ====
On April 15, 2021, this episode was released. It features the alternate Flashpoint timeline, where every character is different due to a change the Flash made. Work alongside Batman (Thomas Wayne) of this universe, Cyborg, the Flash and Kid Flash to set things right.

==== Episode 41: House of Legends ====
This episode released on August 25, 2021, provides both hero and villains a cross-faction headquarters for the first time. The player meets with the Monitor to learn more of the upcoming storyline everyone will be facing in the upcoming episodes. The House of Legends contains several alternate reality versions of heroes and villains that characters have aided or defeated before are all working together against the inevitable arrival of a universal being known as Perpetua.

==== Episode 42: Legion of Doom ====
This episode released on December 9, 2021. It is part one of two of a story line that began in Metal. Lex Luthor had formed a new Legion of Doom in service of the malevolent creator of the Multiverse, Perpetua. Martian Manhunter leads the way and tries to thwart Luthor's endgame.

==== Episode 43: Dark Knights ====
This episode released on April 14, 2022. It is part two of a story line that began in Metal as well as serving as the finale of the Metal story line. Perpetua's endgame is revealed to be the complete destruction of the multiverse. Wonder Woman, Batman, Superman, and Lex Luthor (who Perpetua betrayed when he failed her) are what stands between Perpetua and a Multiversal-Armageddon.

==== Episode 44: The Sins of Black Adam ====
This episode released on October 26, 2022. Black Adam makes a deal with Neron to save his eternal love, Isis. But Neron tricks him. Black Adam joins with Shazam and Mary Marvel to contend with Neron and his forces for the future of Kahndaq and to rescue Isis.

==== Episode 45: Shock to the System ====
This episode released on April 20, 2023. The episode features a new location, Dakota City, and characters from the Milestone Comics line. The episode also featured new and returning enemies where players could face off against Ebon, the Fearsome Five, and DeSaad.

==== Episode 46: Justice League Dark Cursed ====
On October 5, 2023, the forty-sixth episode, Justice League Dark Cursed, was released. The episode's storyline revolved around players journeying to cursed Gotham City, town square theater, cursed House of Mystery, and cursed Themyscira.

==== Episode 47: Brainiac Returns ====
On May 23, 2024, the forty-seventh episode, Brainiac Returns, was released. Seeking to learn from his previous defeats, Brainiac has returned to launch an all-out assault on the Earth's ultimate symbols of hope and resistance - the Hall of Justice and the Hall of Doom. With the world hanging in the balance, the Justice League and Lex Luthor's Secret Society are forced to unite their powers and resources to thwart Brainiac's plan.

==== Episode 48: Harley Quinn vs Apokolips ====
On September 24, 2024, the forty-eighth episode, Harley Quinn vs Apokolips was released.

=== Chapters ===
==== Chapter 1: Light & Rain: Day of Reckoning ====
On January 28, 2025, (first of a 4-part arc, "Light and Rain") Day of Reckoning, was released.

==== Chapter 2: Light & Rain: Fearful Day ====
On May 28, 2025, Fearful Day, was released.

==== Chapter 3: Light & Rain: Raging Night ====
On September 23, 2025, Raging Night, was released.

==== Chapter 4: Light & Rain: Hope Burns Bright ====
2026, (Finale of a 4-part arc), Hope Burns Bright.

=== Seasonal Content ===
In addition to episodes, Daybreak also releases seasonal-themed content throughout the year, which rewards players with new feats, seasonal styles, base items and trinkets.

==== Anti-Monitor Anniversary Event ====
Released in January each year (starting in 2017) to celebrate the game's anniversary, this content focuses on an attack by the Anti-Monitor. Content features an open world area of Metropolis-based around the Science Spire which is under attack from invaders from Qward, a single player challenge set in the Earth-3 Panopticon where players must rescue Lex Luthor from Johnny Quick, and an 8-player raid where players face off against the Anti-Monitor and his army. Players are rewarded with Qwardian Crowns which can be used to purchase items from the event vendor.

==== Love Conquers All ====
The February seasonal content is based around Valentine's Day. Originally released in 2011 and titled Valentine's Day, the event featured a daily mission for heroes becoming cherubs and a separate one for villains becoming imps which lead to a fight with Aphrodite and rewarded styles, feats and collection items. Player reaction to the event was mostly negative, which led to the content being scrapped. The event reappeared in a limited fashion in 2013, when Daybreak released a single mission that granted players all the feats and styles which were part of the original event. 2014 also featured the same solo mission, as well as a second mission which rewarded two new t-shirt styles. The content made a full return in 2015 under the new title, Love Conquers All, which features several hero and villain missions, as well as a 4-player Alert. The event has been updated each year since with new feats, styles, and base items.

==== Mxyzptlk's Mischief ====
Released to coincide with Saint Patrick's Day, this content has an Irish theme and features Mister Mxyzptlk. The content features an open world daily mission, and races located around the Daily Planet area of Metropolis. Players are rewarded with Four-Leaf Clovers which can be used to purchase items from the event vendor.

==== Springtime ====
This content features missions based around Spring renewal and Swamp Thing. There is an open world daily mission based in Gotham City where Poison Ivy has invaded and turned the citizens of Gotham into plant monsters. In addition to the open world mission, there is also a 4-player Alert where players must help release Swamp Thing from Ivy's control. Players are rewarded with Seed Pods that can be used to purchase items from the event vendor.

==== Tides of War ====
This event is released in the summer and has an Atlantean theme. Players must help Aquaman to repel an attack from his brother, Ocean Master, on the surface world. Villain players assist Ocean Master in attacking Aquaman's forces. The content features an open world mission based in the waters around Metropolis, and a 4-player Alert in which players must take on Ocean Master or Aquaman directly depending on their faction. Sand Dollars are the unique currency gained from this event, and can be used to purchase items at the event vendor.

==== The Witching Hour ====
Originally the 2011 Halloween content was a version of the Scarecrow mission based in Gotham Sewers under the title Halloween Spook-tacular. However, player reception of the event was largely negative due to it being seen as a rehash of an existing mission. The following year the content was replaced by a new event titled The Witching Hour. The new content featured an open world mission for all players and a 4-player Alert called The Midnight Masquerade, in which players must face off against Klarion the Witch Boy and his cat familiar Teekl.

==== Season's Greedings ====
This Christmas-themed event features the Orange Lantern, Larfleeze, as he seeks to steal all the Christmas presents, trees and cakes for himself. Players can partake in an open world mission to retrieve those items from Larfleeze's Orange Lantern constructs, as well as take on Larfleeze directly in a 4-player Alert. As of 2017, all players were granted a special Christmas tree base item which gives out daily rewards over the 12 days of Christmas. In addition to the usual feats, styles and base items, the content also rewards players with snowballs which they can use to have snowball fights with each other.

== Comics ==
DC Comics announced in January 2010 that they would be releasing DC Universe Online: Legends, a 52-issue weekly limited series (along the lines of previous similar series like 52, Countdown to Final Crisis and Trinity) based on the game. Rather than a weekly series, the format was changed to a bi-weekly series, with comic book writer Tony Bedard, game writer Marv Wolfman, and artists Howard Porter and Adriana Melo. The title was launched in February 2011 and concluded in May 2012.

== Reception ==
Reception

Aggregate score
Aggregator	Score
Metacritic	PC: 72/100; PS3: 67/100; PS4: 75/100; NS: 73/100

Review scores
Publication	Score
Eurogamer	6/10
GameSpot	7.0
GamesRadar+	6/10
IGN	8/10
PC Gamer (US)	88%
X-Play	4/5

DC Universe Online received mixed to positive reviews from critics, having received 7/10 from IGN at initial launch and showing further improvement with 8/10 from IGN after its PlayStation 4 launch.

By August 2014, DC Universe Online had 18 million registered users and was the number one revenue-generating free-to-play game on PlayStation 3 and PlayStation 4. By September 2020, the game had 419,000 monthly active players and 40,000 subscribers.
