= League of Assassins =

Fictional villain group by DC Comics

- Cover art of Batman and Robin (vol. 2) #23.3 (September 2013); Art by Mick Gray and Patrick Gleason.

Publication information
- Publisher: DC Comics
- First appearance: Detective Comics #405 (November 1970)
- Created by: Denny O'Neil (writer); Neal Adams (artist)

In-story information
- Type of organization: Secret society, criminal organization
- Base(s): 'Eth Alth'eban, Arabia
- Leader(s): Heads: Ra's al Ghul, Talia al Ghul, Nyssa Raatko, Cassandra Cain, Vandal Savage; Appointed deputies: Doctor Darrk, League of Assassin Council (Bronze Tiger, Cheshire, Lady Shiva, December Graystone, Rictus)

Roster

The League of Assassins (also colloquially referred to as the League of Shadows) is a secret society of supervillains appearing in American comic books published by DC Comics. The organization first appeared in Strange Adventures #215 (December 1968), but did not become officially known as the League of Assassins until Detective Comics #405 (November 1970). Primarily serving as antagonists of Batman, the group also serves as enemies of various other superheroes in the DC Universe.

Founded by the immortal Ra's al Ghul, the League of Assassins is composed of the world's deadliest fighter, assassins, and mercenaries whose sold services allows Ra's to gain political power, funding, and loyal members to aid him. In addition, the organization is also split into two other sub-organizations; the League of Shadows differs from the previous society, directly supporting his eco-terrorist agenda and as a deterrent against betrayal and internal strife. The League of Lazarus, the most enigmatic of the three, was established as a means to secure Lazarus Pits, supernatural restorative pools able to extend the lifespan of those who bathe within it. While the Leagues has been primarily led by Ra's, it has been led by other relatives such as his daughters, Talia al Ghul and Nyssa Raatko, and other appointed leaders and councils. On occasion, smaller factions and splinter groups from in-fighting have also formulated within the organization.

The League of Assassins has been adapted into other media several times (sometimes under the name Society of Shadows), predominantly in animated Batman productions, the live-action film series The Dark Knight Trilogy, the CW series Arrow, and the Fox series Gotham.

== Origins ==
Cover of Detective Comics #405 (November 1970), introducing the League of Assassins. Art by Neal Adams.

=== League of Assassins ===
Yasser split from the ancient Order of Assassins in a successor movement. Their followers claim to have annulled and deposed centers of civilizations such as Baghdad, Moscow, and Rome throughout past generations in their lineage. As a part of The Demon, it is sometimes called "The Demon's Fang" or "Demonfang".

==== Practices ====
The recruits of the League of Assassins follow a strict regimen, carrying distinct black emblems and supplies up to their mountain lairs. These new recruits are called Ghuls, because they emerge after proclaiming their final prayers in their own prefabricated graves before initiating in various, assigned operations.

==== Operations ====
Unlike the ancient Order of the Assassins, whose main objective was to halt sectarian conflicts and wars within the world, the League of Assassins acts as an organization that is a catalyst to the reformation of decadent civilizations around the globe.

== Fictional team history ==
=== Under Ebeneezer Darrk's leadership ===
The League of Assassins was founded by Ra's al Ghul in 1013 A.D. to be "the fang that protects the head" (Batgirl #67, 2005). Members of the League demonstrated willingness to die at a word from Ra's. They have included some of the most dangerous assassins in the world including Lady Shiva, David Cain, and Merlyn. For much of its current history, any member who failed in an assassination was in turn targeted by the League. Indeed, one of its best-known members, the master-archer Merlyn, was eventually forced to flee from the League, fearing for his life after having failed to assassinate Batman.

Ebeneezer Darcel, aka Doctor Darrk, was the first known individual assigned to head the League of Assassins by Ra's al Ghul. Darrk himself was seconded by the Sensei, a martial arts master from Hong Kong. Although many of the League's leaders over the years have been accomplished martial artists, Darrk himself did not depend on physical prowess, and as an assassin he instead relied upon careful planning and manipulation, ambushes and death traps, as well as a variety of cleverly concealed weapons and poisons. Although the League apparently had an inner circle of elite fighters as well as a large number of warriors trained in the martial arts, the League during Darrk's tenure as leader reflected his personal methodology. Following a "falling out" with Ra's, Darrk kidnapped Ra's daughter, Talia al Ghul. Batman became involved in this matter while attempting to bring the League to justice for a number of recent killings. Although he had connected the League to several assassinations over the years, all previous attempts to investigate had met dead-ends. Batman rescued Talia (the first time the two would meet, laying the foundation for all their future interaction) and Darrk died while trying to kill them.

=== Under Sensei's leadership ===
Under the direction of the organization's second known leader, the villainous Sensei, the League became more brutal, and it rebelled against Ra's' rule. Although the Sensei's methods closely resembled Darrk's, and the majority of the League's operatives showed little to no real skill in personal combat, the Sensei did show slightly more reliance on skilled martial artists.

This version of the League is best known for two assassinations. As part of an initiation process, the operative known as the Hook was assigned to murder Boston Brand (who became Deadman after his death). Additionally, Professor Ojo successfully brainwashed Ben Turner (best friend and partner of Richard Dragon), creating an alternate personality dubbed Bronze Tiger, and turning the master martial artist into a League operative. As the Bronze Tiger, Turner defeated Batman in personal combat while another League operative murdered Kathy Kane (the secret identity of Batwoman in pre-Crisis continuity, and a close personal friend of Batman's post-crisis). Eventually Turner's earlier training at the hands of O-Sensei (not to be confused with the leader of the League) proved too strong for the League to fully break, and when he refused to kill Batman he was forced to flee the League.

Not long afterwards, the insane Sensei—no longer motivated by anything but a desire to raise assassination to an art—attempted to cause an artificial earthquake in order to kill a number of diplomats gathered for peace talks. Batman traced Ben Turner to a hospital, foiling a League attempt to assassinate the man. Turner could not fully remember the actions of his alternate personality (although years later, as a member of the Suicide Squad, he would reveal that the League had used him to kill a number of people), but he was able to aid Batman in uncovering the Sensei's latest plot. Although Batman was unable to prevent the earthquake, ultimately it was only the Sensei himself that died in the disaster, and control of the League returned to Ra's.

=== Role in the creation of Lady Shiva ===
Prior to the betrayals of Doctor Darrk and the Sensei, Ra's had grown tired of the fickle loyalties of his warriors. Ra's assigned David Cain to create a perfect bodyguard ("The One Who Is All"). After early attempts to raise such a person resulted in hopelessly psychotic children, Cain decided that he needed a genetically suited child and began searching for a possible mother. To this end he assassinated Carolyn Woosan/Wu-San, one of two astonishingly talented martial artist sisters he had seen fighting in an exhibition. Carolyn's sister, Sandra, swore revenge and tracked Cain down, only to be subdued by the combined might of the League. Both intoxicated and frightened by the levels of skill she was attaining now that she was no longer holding back for her sister's sake, Sandra agreed to be the mother of Cain's child. In return, the League spared Sandra's life, and assisted her in further training. By the time Sandra gave birth she had surpassed the entire League in skill. She left immediately following the birth of her daughter, Cassandra Cain, rechristening herself Lady Shiva.

Other stories would suggest that at some points afterwards Shiva worked as a member of the League, and eyewitness testimony from former League member Onyx indicates that she kept in contact with the League, although she apparently did not see her daughter. Although most of her appearances over the years show her working independently, she apparently had some degree of League membership, and was called upon by Ra's to "rescue" Talia during the Hush storyline.

In keeping with Ra's and Cain's plans, the League attempted to train Cassandra Cain from birth to be the ultimate assassin, unknowingly giving her the skills she would use as the hero Batgirl.

=== Under Nyssa Raatko's leadership ===
After the death of Ra's al Ghul, his first-born daughter Nyssa Raatko formed a new League. Lady Shiva was recruited to serve as the sensei to this incarnation of the League, with the intent that Batgirl (Cassandra Cain) would lead the warriors themselves.

Reflecting Shiva's emphasis for martial arts, the known members of Nyssa's League were all skilled in this area, and included the warriors Shrike, Kitty Kumbata, Wam-Wam, Joey N'Bobo, Tigris, Momotado, Krunk, White Willow, the twin warriors Los Gemelos, Ox, Mad Dog, Alpha, and Cristos. The new League was present when Mr. Freeze's wife Nora Fries was brought back to life as the monstrous Lazara, and several members died in the resulting chaos.

Due to the conflict between their loyalty to Shiva and Nyssa and their near-worship of Batgirl as "The One Who is All", the League split at that point, with Ox, White Willow, and Tigris pledging themselves to Cassandra. Several more members of the League (including all the defectors except Tigris) died when the insane "Mad Dog" went on a killing spree. "The Mad Dog", it was revealed, had been one of David Cain's early attempts to create Ra's' perfect warrior. The Mad Dog had been considered useless as a child, since Cain's methods had driven him murderously insane, and Ra's had ordered the child be killed. Nyssa, however, knew that the servant ordered to carry out this execution had instead released him into the wild, explaining how it was possible to recruit him. The Mad Dog was successful in killing Batgirl (who gave her life to protect the burqa-clad assassin Tigris). She was quickly restored to life in a Lazarus Pit by Shiva, in order that the two could face each other in a final battle. Batgirl won leaving Shiva on a meat hook suspended over the Lazarus Pit.

=== Infinite Crisis ===
Although most of its members had died or defected, the League survived the "Infinite Crisis", and was seen to play an important role in the Society's worldwide prison break. Throughout the period of aftermath it remained under the control of Nyssa, until she was apparently killed in a car explosion. Cassandra Cain has apparently taken over the League as its new leader, although she abandoned the League at some point prior to the Teen Titans storyline Titans East, where it is revealed that she was being drugged by Deathstroke.

Furthermore, it appears that Cassandra was battling for complete control of the League of Assassins with Ra's al Ghul's youngest daughter Talia, as well as the Sensei. Talia, who would naturally assume control of her father's empire by default following Nyssa's death, was seen in the Batman and Son storyline, leading ninja members of the League of Assassins, against Batman. At the same time, several members felt neither Talia nor Cassandra were up to the role, and, after failing to recruit Black Canary's adopted daughter Sin, gave the leadership to the Sensei, who reappeared in the "Resurrection of Ra's al Ghul" storyline.

"One Year Later", Talia al Ghul forced Kirk Langstrom to give her the Man-Bat formula which she used to turn some of its members into Man-Bats. Currently, the League of Assassins and its Man-Bat Commandos are used by Talia as her personal army and bodyguards, carrying her orders and taking retribution over her enemies.

In the series Green Arrow/Black Canary #11, a metahuman faction of the League of Assassins was introduced. They were involved in the abduction of an injured Connor Hawke. This group's members included Bear, Tolliver, Ruck, Spike, Mazone, and their leader Targa. However, although they thought they were being commanded by Ra's al Ghul, they were apparently duped by an imposter Shado.

=== The New 52 ===
In 2011, The New 52 rebooted the DC universe. The League of Assassins reside in the sacred city of 'Eth Alth'eban. Lady Shiva, Rictus, Cheshire, December Graystone, and Bronze Tiger target Red Hood. They end up capturing Red Hood and bring him to 'Eth Alth'eban so that he can help lead the League of Assassins. Red Hood has been led to 'Eth Alth'eban, where the League of Assassins resides. Bronze Tiger explains that costumed heroes have been fighting to maintain a broken system—a system that can only be fixed by taking the next step, and culling the weak and wicked from the world. He and the others have chosen Red Hood to be their leader in taking the action that the world's super-heroes have been too afraid to take. Red Hood admits that he abandoned his friends because he did not want to be a killer. In response, Bronze Tiger begs the opportunity to show Red Hood how to do real lasting good. The assassins give Red Hood a tour of the Death Market, where tools of death and murder can be bought, to fill any need provided that the need in question is killing a lot of people. After reuniting with December Graystone, Cheshire, Lady Shiva, and Rictus, Bronze Tiger calls a meeting of the council to which Red Hood is invited. Meanwhile, they are concerned about the security of the city, given the coming war. Rictus assures them that it would take approximately four hundred terawatts of power to break through the city's walls. At their meeting, Red Hood wonders what it is about him that makes them think he can lead them to victory against the Untitled. Bronze Tiger admits amid jeers from his companions that he was told by Talia al Ghul that Red Hood would be the only one who could stop the Untitled if they ever attacked. This comes as a surprise to Red Hood, given that he cannot even remember what the Untitled look like. Bronze Tiger reminds that if Red Hood wants to do good with his life, he cannot do much better than to fight against the most powerful force for evil on the planet. Just then, sensors reveal that something is on the perimeter of the city. It is Arsenal and he is heavily armed.

Arsenal is using all of his unique inventions to hold back the defensive attacks of the Man-Bat Commandos of the League of Assassins. The first assassin Arsenal encounters is December Graystone and he soon entraps the magician within a block of ice, thanks to some grenades made with technology he stole from Mr. Freeze. Next, Cheshire appears next to him thanks to her teleportation abilities and steals the hat off of his head. However, he spots the teleportation device implanted in her wrist and uses an electrical shock to short it out. That causes the device to malfunction and she disappears completely. During the fight, Red Hood states that he would lead the League of Assassins in exchange that Arsenal and Starfire are unharmed. Starfire reminds Red Hood that she would rather die than be put in chains again. She warns him that with the last Lazarus Pit uncovered, it can strip away the Untitled's powers, which is why they have come to destroy it. They must not succeed. As she and Arsenal are escorted away, she warns Red Hood not to die today. As he prepares himself, Red Hood begins to hear a voice from within that explains that his destiny is coming to fruition, and shows him how to make the mystical All-Blades manifest in his hands. Though he does not remember what all this means, he hopes it will help, as the Untitled arrive in the sacred city.

Outside the sacred city of 'Eth Alth'eban, December Graystone discovers someone he was not expecting to see waiting outside and curses himself for not realizing that this person had something to do with the battle currently underway in the subterranean city. Red Hood is currently leading the League of Assassins in a charge against the evil Untitled, who had the gall to use Red Hood's friend Arsenal against him to get into the city. Red Hood is confused when his swords tell him that by taking bronze shards from the great fountain at the centre of the city, they will be able to drive off the Untitled, but he hopefully passes on the information to his companions. Red Hood finds himself locked in combat with Drakar and the man discovers that what was done to Red Hood's mind was more than a simple mind-wipe. He senses Ducra somewhere within his mind. Red Hood uses Drakar's confusion to steer him toward the fountain, which hides the Well of Sins (the pool that filled the Untitled with evil). Drakar struggles, but collapses into the murky fluid. Having fallen into the Well of Sins, Drakar begs to be removed from it as he can feel the arcane power reaching back inside him, and taking the evil energy within him away. The pool strips Drakar of his power and life-force, spitting him back out as a withered old man. Turning to the remaining Untitled, Red Hood warns that they will all suffer the same fate if they do not surrender. The Untitled respond that he cannot hope to defeat them alone, but Lady Shiva responds by unleashing a swarm of Man-Bats warning that the League of Assassins is death incarnate. When the Untitled have been cast back into the Well of Sins by the League of Assassins, Drakar plans to take Red Hood with him only for Bronze Tiger to snap Drakar's neck. Following Drakar's death, Red Hood admits that killing Drakar was necessary—a key realization for a member of the League of Assassins. Lady Shiva comments that tonight, they will see all the remaining Untitled dead as well, but Red Hood responds that they cannot simply kill without his say-so if he is to be the League's leader. Suddenly, a cloaked figure appears, noting that he expected more after coming all this way, just to find a leader of assassins who orders his warriors to sheathe their blades. The man warns that the game is over, and Red Hood's part in it is done, as he makes his way toward the Well of Sins. Red Hood stands in his way, demanding to know who this man is. The man responds that he is the one who gave the Untitled the location of the Acres of All knowing that they would kill Ducra and return to this place. He knew they would fall here, and imbue the Well of Sins with a greater power than he had ever tasted—a power that he would now take for himself, having planned this moment for three centuries. Emerging from the pit, the man introduces himself as Ra's al Ghul.

Red Hood is under attack by Ra's al Ghul who demands to know just what his daughter Talia al Ghul saw in the boy. Having just emerged from the Well of Sins, Ra's al Ghul is consumed by the evil that once corrupted the Untitled centuries ago. Now he feels compelled to rid himself of the machinations of his daughter and Ducra by killing Red Hood. At Ra's al Ghul's command, the prisoners are brought to him, and he promises to use his newfound power to see them dead. Red Hood, however, determines that he cannot allow it to happen. As Ra's al Ghul gathers his power, Red Hood tells himself again and again that he wants to remember what he chose to forget. At last, the images rush through his mind, and begin to reform as memories. Unfortunately, the revelation occurs earlier than Ducra had planned. Having regained all of his training with Batman as well, Red Hood is free of his chains almost instantly. His training with Lady Shiva sees him making short work of the League's Man-Bats. He uses that same training to best Lady Shiva herself, only to be attacked by Bronze Tiger next. In the meantime though, Cheshire (whose loyalty to the League of Assassin's returned master is waning) attempts to rescue Roy and Starfire. Before long, the pair are free to aid Red Hood in his fight. Smirking, he welcomes them back, apologizing for his having deceived them. They are confused, unaware that his decision to erase his memory was part of a grander plan. Red Hood engages Ra's al Ghul as Essence joins the battle. She insists that he will allow Red Hood and his friends to leave his realm, or he will be forced to die a mortal death just as he always feared he would. Despite having destroyed the All-Caste, Ra's' actions have led to their eventual rebirth. Defeated, he swears that he will visit great agony upon Red Hood if he sees him ever again.

Talia's own organization, Leviathan, is a schism of the League of Assassins created to counter Batman's "Batman Incorporated".

Batman and Aquaman head to an island where the League of Assassins are, after Ra's al Ghul had the bodies of Damian Wayne and Talia al Ghul exhumed. Batman and Aquaman storm the beach, breaking through the island's defences of Man-Bats, only to find that the source of the whales' screaming was on the island. Ra's al Ghul had ordered the hunt of whales, creating genetically altered super-humans in the wombs of sperm whales. This being just one of a probable many plans to rebuild the League of Assassins. Aquaman swears vengeance on the whales' behalves. Inside the compound, they find that Ra's is wiping the hard drives clean, preventing data recovery, even as a message from Ra's plays over the intercom, chastising Batman for failing to prevent the deaths of Damian or Talia within the city he swore to protect. As his parting gift, he has left Batman the Heretics to keep him entertained. Batman reels as he sees all of the grotesque and mutated failed clones of failed Damians. As they fight for their lives, Batman warns Aquaman not to kill any of these monstrosities. They are too developmentally malformed to comprehend what they had done to those whales in being born. Suddenly, Bruce realizes that if the Heretics were born of a whale's womb, Arthur might be able to telepathically link up with them. He leads them out into the ocean, where an unharmed whale breaches, and swallows them whole. Batman, meanwhile, fights his way to Ra's escape aircraft. He sees Talia and Damian's bodies stored within it, and clings to the fuselage from outside as the plane takes off. Though Ra's al Ghul plans to go to Paradise Island, he is nearly surprised to see Batman pounding on the cockpit's windshield. From outside, Batman screams for Ra's al Ghul to give back his son, but Ra's al Ghul responds that he is blood of Damian's blood and the boy is in good hands. He orders the plane to tilt its angle, causing the wind shear to rip Batman from his purchase and drop down into the sea. Luckily, Aquaman is there to catch him. Arthur explains that all of the Heretics are alive, having been taken down by a whale to Atlantis for safe keeping.

=== DC Rebirth ===
In 2016, DC Comics implemented another relaunch of its books called DC Rebirth, which restored its continuity to a form much as it was prior to "The New 52". The League of Assassins and League of Shadows are two separate organizations. The League of Assassins consists of Ra's al Ghul's standard followers, while the League of Shadows is the more mysterious of the two and is often considered a myth, but are said to have people everywhere and to have a plan to "bring the entire nation to the ground".

At a later point in time, Connor Hawke, the estranged son of Green Arrow, washes up on the shores of an unknown island, where he is rescued by the League of Shadows. They offer him an invitation to join their ranks, as they need a "champion" to enter the League of Lazarus tournament and bond with the Lazarus Demon. Connor accepts the offer, intending to stop their plan to awaken the demon. The Shadows send Hawke as their champion of the League of Lazarus tournament and monitor him vigilantly. The tournament eventually leads to the Shadow War, during which Ra's al Ghul is killed and Talia al Ghul surrenders control of the League of Shadows. Talia is jointly succeeded by her right hand Angel Breaker and sister Nyssa al Ghul, who develop romantic feelings for one another.

== Members ==
Since the organization's debut and publication history, the League of Assassin's hierarchy and overall goal has been retroactively changed several times. In later appearances, Ra's al Ghul's secret society is split into three secret societies with differing goals that aid in his agenda.

=== League of Assassins ===
The League of Assassins was retroactively established as a means for Ra's to gain favor through sold servies of teams and agents to various nations, giving him great funding, political power, and capable warriors. While originally operating in secret, their clandestine operations became more public due to an expanding superhero community in more modern stories. The organization's leadership has changed over time; originally, the League of Assassins was alternatively led by deputies appointed by Ra's himself and was subjected to usurpation. During the New 52 era, the League of Assassins was led by a council of master assassins loyal to Ra's al Ghul's agenda and goals.

==== Major characters ====
Character	First appearance	Role
High-ranking members
Ra's al Ghul	Batman #232 (June 1971)	Founder and leader of all three leagues.
Nyssa Raatko	Detective Comics #783 (August 2003)	Ra's al Ghul's right hand and former leader.
Talia al Ghul	Detective Comics #411 (May 1971)	Former leader and high-ranking member.
The Sensei	Strange Adventures #215 (December 1968).	Formerly Professor Darrk's second-in-command and prior leader via usurption
Damian Wayne	Batman: Son of the Demon (1987); Batman #655 (September 2006)	
League of Assassins Council
Bronze Tiger	Richard Dragon, Kung Fu Fighter #1 (May 1975)	Brainwashed martial arts teacher and operative
Cheshire	New Teen Titans Annual #2 (September 1983)	Master assassin and operative
Lady Shiva	Richard Dragon, Kung Fu Fighter #5 (December 1975)	Martial arts teacher and operative
Master assassins and martial artists
Merlyn	Justice League of America #94 (November 1971)	Former member of the Seven Men of Death.
Bane	Batman: Vengeance of Bane #1 (January 1993)	Former member who joined after impressing Ra's al Ghul.
Richard Dragon	Kung Fu Master, Richard Dragon: Dragon's Fists (1974)	Martial arts teacher until his death by his student.
Cassandra Cain	Batman #567 (1999)	Former brainwashed operative
Deathstroke	The New Teen Titans #2 (December 1980)	Once recruited by Talia to kill Nightwing for coverting her son.

==== Other League of Assassins characters ====
- Ubu – A master assassin who is Ra's al Ghul's trusted second-in-command. In later works, it is revealed that the title of Ubu refers to a whole tribe of people. When one Ubu dies, another one takes his place. An Ubu was later killed by Bane.
- Ebeneezer Darrk (also known as Doctor or Professor Darrk) – He is the first known individual assigned to head the League of Assassins by Ra's al Ghul. Although many of the League's leaders over the years have been accomplished martial artists, Daark himself did not depend on physical prowess, and as an assassin he instead relied upon careful planning and manipulation, ambushes and death traps, as well as a variety of cleverly concealed weapons and poisons. After earning Ra's enmity (for reasons unknown), Darrk died during a plot to kidnap Talia which was foiled by Batman.
- The Seven Men of Death – The seven deadliest assassins of the League and Ra's al Ghul's personal hit squad. They answer only to the Demon himself and the Sensei. Its members have included:
  - Detonator – Member of the Seven Men of Death. He specializes in demolitions.
  - Hook – A hook-handed member of the Seven Men of Death. He was responsible for murdering Boston Brand during a circus act.
  - Maduvu – Member of the Seven Men of Death. He has mechanical clawed-hands.
  - Razorburn – Member of the Seven Men of Death. He has advanced hand-to-hand combat abilities, great throwing abilities, and wields two knives for weapons.
  - Shellcase – Member of the Seven Men of Death. He has advanced hand-to-hand combat abilities and has good marksmanship.
  - Whip – A female whip-wielding member of the Seven Men of Death.
  - Unnamed shuriken-wielding assassin – A male domino-mask wearing, shuriken-wielding member of the Seven Men of Death. He debuted in "Bruce Wayne: The Road Home," as a replacement for Merlyn. Despite multiple appearances, his name has never been given.
- Alpha – A member of the League of Assassins and a master of Gun-Fu.
- Anya Volkova – Former League of Assassins, she collected a database about the members of the league which was stolen by the Court of Owls.
- Bear – A Mexican Bigfoot-like man who is a member of the League of Assassins' metahuman faction.
- December Graystone – A League of Assassins operative that was introduced in The New 52. He can perform blood magic where he cuts himself to access various powers through spilled blood like telekinesis and teleportation.
- Dr. Tzin-Tzin – A criminal mastermind and expert hypnotist.
- Dragon Fly – Member of the League of Assassins. She alongside Silken Spider and Tiger Moth attacked Wayne Manor during the events of "The Resurrection of Ra's al Ghul".
- Expediter – Member of the League of Assassins. He was a computer expert who serves a similar function compared to Oracle upon being forced to join the League of Assassins.
- Glaze – Builds cities in various locations of the worlds and is a master of economic bubbles.
- Grind – One of Ra's al Ghul's bodyguards.
- Ishmael - An assassin enhanced by the Lazarus Pit's waters.
- Jasper – Jasper and Nyssa capture a serum.
- Kirigi – A top martial artist who previously trained Bruce Wayne. He later trained the different members of the League of Assassins.
- Kitty Kumbata – A talented but mentally unstable martial artist who was a former member of the Circle of Six.
- Kyle Abbot – A former Intergang member, Abbot took a serum that enables him to transform into a wolf.
- Mad Dog – Mad Dog is a kung fu fighter who was the adoptive son of David Cain.
- Man-Bat Commandos – When Talia al Ghul forced Dr. Kirk Langstrom into giving her the Man-Bat formula, she transformed a select bunch of unnamed League of Assassins members into Man-Bat Commandos.
- Mazone – A bearded samurai who is a member of the League of Assassins' metahuman faction.
- Onyx – Onyx was a longstanding fully capable member of the League of Assassins. She eventually decided to retire from her life of murder.
- Owens – A sniper who is a member of the League of Assassins. He was partnered up with Pru and Z to assassinate Red Robin. Owens is killed by Widower of the Council of Spiders.
- Professor Ojo – Ojo was born without eyes. Brilliant but blind, Ojo eventually created a device allowing him to see and eventually became associated with the League of Assassins as one of their scientists.
- Pru – A headstrong female assassin who is a member of the League of Assassins. She was partnered up with Owens and Z to assassinate Red Robin.
- Respawn - A clone created with the genetic material of Deathstroke and Talia al Ghul. After escaping torture and captivity at the hands of Ra's al Ghul, he starts wearing a similar costume to Deathstroke and competed in the Lazarus tournament against Damian Wayne. He died in Shadow War saving Deathstroke.
- Rictus – A cybernetically enhanced operative of the League of Assassins who was introduced in The New 52.
- Ruck – A four-armed gunman who is a member of the League of Assassins' metahuman branch.
- Scimitar – Leads a coalition of members from the League.
- Shrike – A teenage boy who used to be friend of Dick Grayson. He later became a member of the League of Assassins.
- Silken Spider – Member of the League of Assassins. She alongside Dragon Fly and Tiger Moth attacked Wayne Manor during the events of "The Resurrection of Ra's al Ghul".
- Silver Monkey – A former member of the Monkey Fist Cult who became an assassin-for-hire.
- Spike – A female martial artist who can create energy blades. She is a member of the League of Assassins' metahuman faction.
- Targa – A telekinetic metahuman with dwarfism who is the leader of the League of Assassins' metahuman faction.
- Tiger Moth – Member of the League of Assassins. Her costume disorients her opponents, making them incapable of hitting her. She once assisted Dragon Fly and Silken Spider into attacking Wayne Manor during the events of "The Resurrection of Ra's al Ghul".
- Tigris – A female Afghan martial artist who was recruited into the League of Assassins by Lady Shiva; she traced her lineage to the ancient kingdom of Nineveh.
- Tolliver – A vampire who is a member of the League of Assassins' metahuman faction.
- Vial – Member of the League of Assassins. He was killed upon kissing his cross that was poisoned by Funnel of the Council of Spiders.
- Verdigris – He escapes a siege only to have his tracks traced.
- Viper – The League's foremost manufacturer of poison.
- Wam Wam – A Dutch martial artist who was a former member of the Circle of Six.
- Whisper A'Daire – She worked with Ra's al Ghul until his apparent death. She took a serum that enables her to transform into a snake-like creature.
- White Ghost – Dusan al Ghul is the first White Ghost was Ra's al Ghul's only son.
- White Ghost – The second White Ghost was an unknown person who healed Red Robin after he was poisoned by Widower of the Council of Spiders. When Red Robin questioned the White Ghost about his identity, the White Ghost simply replies that "there will always be a white ghost" which suggests that the title of White Ghost is defined as a loyal figure that has been affiliated with the League of Assassins for centuries.
- White Willow – Not much is known about her past except for the fact that she was recruited into the League of Assassins by Lady Shiva.
- Will Justice – Also known as Bill Justice, Will Justice was recruited for the League of Assassins following the annihilation of the village of Crisfield. His radical political agenda did not sit well with the other members of the League leading to his exile. He has since been committed to Arkham Asylum in Gotham City with the circumstances of his breakdown unknown.
- Z – Zeddmore Washington is a member of the League of Assassins. He was paired up with Owens and Pru to assassinate Red Robin. Z was later killed by Widower of the Council of Spiders.

=== League of Shadows ===
The League of Shadows is one of the three societies created by Ra's al Ghul, originally coined as the name given to the secret organization in adapted works. Within mainstream comics, this organization was retroactively the first one created by Ra's as a means to aid his eco-terrorist objective in culling mankind and preserving nature and the Earth itself, although within the League of Assassins, it was once thought to be a myth created to strike fear into Ra's al Ghul's followers. Under Nyssa Raatko, the current League of Shadows' agenda is said to align with reformation of its histories, although it is complicated by Nyssa's private agenda of prolonging her life following the loss of the Lazarus Pits.

==== Major recurring characters ====
Character	First appearance	Role
Nyssa Raatko	Detective Comics #783 (August 2003)	The current leader of the League of Shadows.
Talia al Ghul	Detective Comics #411 (May 1971)	Former leader of the League of Shadows.
Ra's al Ghul	Batman #232 (June 1971)	Founder and leader of all three leagues.
Lady Shiva	Richard Dragon, Kung Fu Fighter #5 (December 1975)	Former leader of the League of Shadows.

==== Other League of Shadows characters ====
- Angel Breaker: First appearing in Shadow War: Alpha #1 (May, 2022), Angel Breaker was originally a high-ranking member under Talia al Ghul's Demon Shadow, created in response to her father's death seemingly at the hands of Deathstroke (later revealed to be a disguised and vengeful Geo-Force). She later serves under Nyssa Raatko, having established a romantic relationship with her.

=== League of Lazarus ===
The last and most enigmatic of Ra's al Ghul's splinter organizations, the society's goals include locating more Lazarus Pits. However, the splinter group would hold differing beliefs, leading to its annexation from both the League of Shadows and Assassins. The League of Lazarus holds a death tournament once every century with the intent of sacrificing the winner to the Lazarus Demon that exists within the Lazarus Pits, allowing it to bond with them.

- Rúh al Ghul / Mother Soul: The leader of the League of Lazarus, she is the mother of Ra's al Ghul and one of the first people he revived upon discovering the Lazarus Pits, but she believes a demon to be responsible for her resurrection. Creating a new faith with worship for the Lazarus Demon, the League of Lazarus annexes itself from both the League of Assassins and Shadows, sparking an internal conflict between the factions to gain control over the Lazarus Pits.

== Other versions ==
In Superman & Batman: Generations, Batman 'inherits' control of the League of Assassins after Bruce Wayne tracks down the organization and accepts a deal where he and Ra's enter the same Lazarus Pit at once; Ra's has determined that if two souls enter the pit, one will perish while the other will become immortal. Bruce accepts the offer, and Ra's al Ghul is destroyed. With Ra's gone, Batman uses the former's criminal empire to set up an anti-crime and humanitarian network by subtly changing the organization's goals.

== In other media ==
=== Television ===
==== Animation ====
- The League of Assassins, renamed the Society of Shadows, appears in series set in the DC Animated Universe, consisting of Ra's al Ghul, Talia al Ghul, Ubu, and Count Vertigo.
  - Additionally, a similar, unrelated group called the Society of Assassins appears in Batman Beyond, consisting of Curaré, the "Master Assassin" Devon, and Mutho Botha.
- The League of Assassins appears in the Batman: The Brave and the Bold episode "Sidekicks Assemble!", consisting of Ra's al Ghul, Talia al Ghul, and Ubu.
- The League of Shadows appears in Young Justice, consisting of Ra's al Ghul, Ubu, Deathstroke, Sensei, Cheshire, Professor Ojo, Black Spider, Sportsmaster, Hook, Lady Shiva, Cassandra Savage, Onyx, Rictus, and Shade. This version of the group is based on Infinity Island, located in the Caribbean Sea, and is initially led by Ra's before Deathstroke takes over.
- The League of Assassins appears in Beware the Batman, consisting of Ra's al Ghul, Lady Shiva, Cypher, and Silver Monkey.
- The League of Shadows appears in the DC Super Hero Girls episode "#LeagueOfShadows". This version of the group is a secret rock band.

==== Live-action ====
The League of Assassins as they appear in Arrow

- The League of Assassins appears in series set in the Arrowverse, consisting of Ra's al Ghul, Malcolm Merlyn, and Nyssa al Ghul.
- The League of Shadows appears in Gotham, consisting of Ra's al Ghul, Sensei, Anubis, the Hunter, Leila, and Palden.

=== Film ===
The League of Shadows as they appear in Batman Begins

- The League of Shadows appears in Christopher Nolan's The Dark Knight trilogy, consisting of Ra's al Ghul, Talia al Ghul, and Ubu.
- The League of Assassins appears in Batman: Under the Red Hood, consisting of Ra's al Ghul and Ubu.
- The League of Assassins appears in the films set in the DC Animated Movie Universe:
  - First appearing in Son of Batman, they are initially led by Ra's al Ghul until his former right-hand and heir Deathstroke kills him and a sect of League ninjas join him.
  - The League of Assassins appears in Batman: Bad Blood, now led by Talia al Ghul and consisting of the Heretic, Electrocutioner, Killer Moth, Firefly, Mad Hatter, Calculator, Onyx, and Tusk.
  - The League of Assassins, now going by the League of Shadows, appears in Justice League Dark: Apokolips War, now led by Damian Wayne with Lady Shiva as his right hand.
- The League of Assassins appears in Batman vs. Teenage Mutant Ninja Turtles, consisting of Ra's al Ghul and Ubu.

=== Video games ===
- The League of Shadows appears in the Batman Begins tie-in game.
- The League of Assassins appears in DC Universe Online.
- The League of Assassins appears in the Batman: Arkham series, consisting of Ra's al Ghul and Talia al Ghul. Additionally, Nyssa Raatko appears as the leader of a rebel faction.
- The League of Shadows appears in Gotham Knights, consisting of Talia al Ghul and a brainwashed Batman.
- The League of Shadows appears in Lego Batman: Legacy of the Dark Knight, consisting of Ra's al Ghul, Talia al Ghul, and Bane.

=== Miscellaneous ===
The Leagues of Assassins (top) and Shadows (bottom) as they appear in the DCAU. Art by Rick Burchett.

- The League of Assassins appears in Batman: Gotham Adventures.
- The League of Assassins appears in Young Justice tie-in comic book.
- The League of Assassins appears in the Arrow tie-in comic The Dark Archer.

== See also ==
- List of Batman Family enemies
