= Alé Garza =

American artist (born 1977)

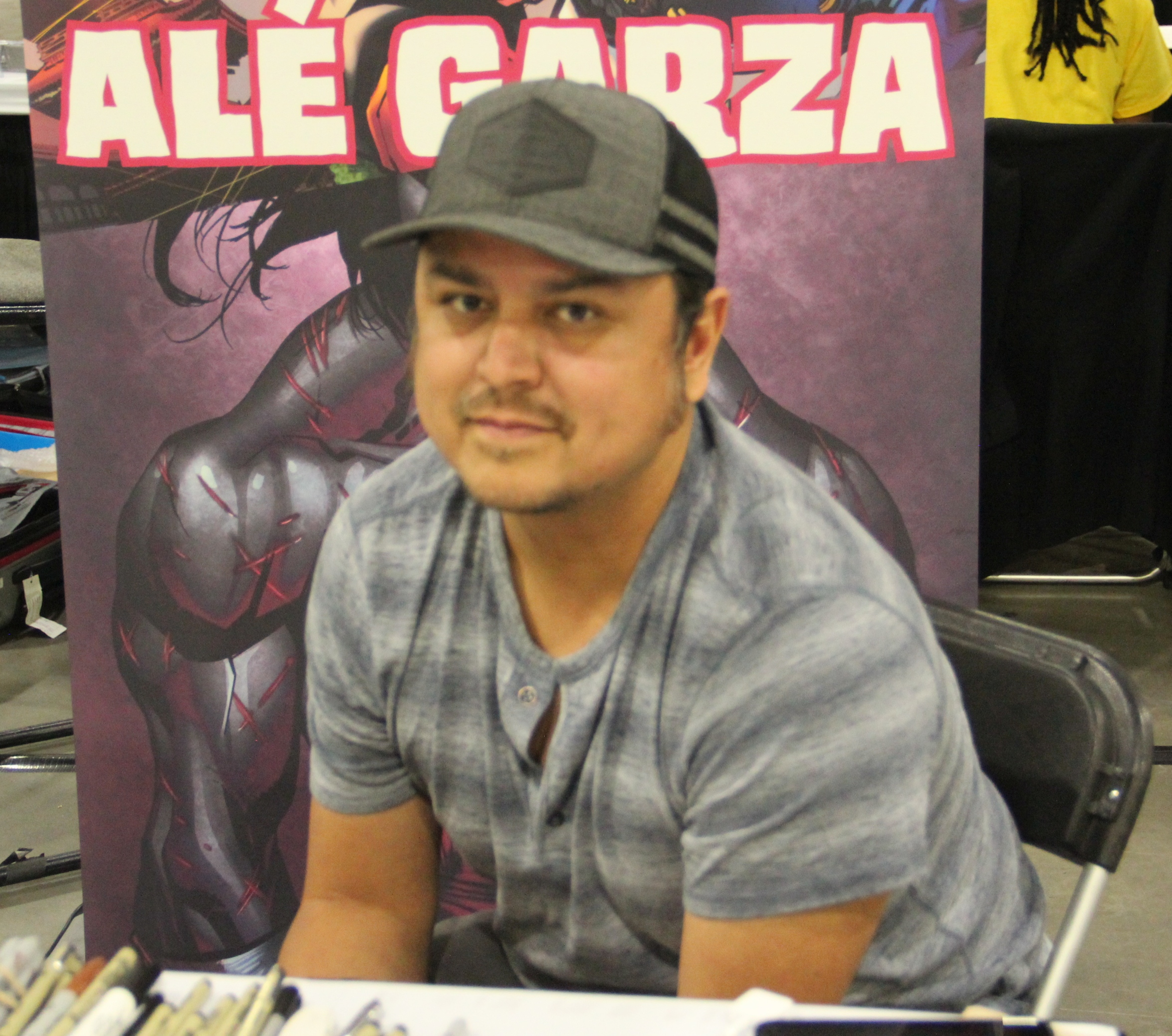
- Garza in 2018
- Born: Alejandro Garza; May 4, 1977 (age 49)
- Area: Penciller

Alé Garza is a penciler and comics artist.
