= Nyssa Raatko =

- Cover to Batman: Death and the Maidens #3 (December 2003). Art by Klaus Janson.

Publication information
- Publisher: DC Comics
- First appearance: Detective Comics #783 (August 2003)
- Created by: Greg Rucka (writer); Klaus Janson (artist)

In-story information
- Team affiliations: League of Assassins
- Notable aliases: Nyssa al Ghul, Nyssa Queen
- Abilities: Martial arts; Alchemy; Slowed aging and accelerated healing via Lazarus Pits

Nyssa Raatko is a supervillain appearing in American comic books published by DC Comics. She was created by Greg Rucka and Klaus Janson for the Batman series of comic books. Nyssa is an enemy of Batman, a daughter of Ra's al Ghul, and the older half-sister of Talia.

Nyssa made her first live-action appearance as a recurring character on the Arrowverse television series Arrow, starting in the second season, played by Katrina Law. She also appeared in the final season of Gotham, portrayed by Jaime Murray.

== Fictional character biography ==
In Batman: Death and the Maidens, it is revealed that Ra's al Ghul and a Russian-Jewish peasant woman had a love child named Nyssa born during his travels in Russia in the 18th century. Enamored by the romantic stories that her mother told her about Ra's as a child, Nyssa sets out to find her father and eventually locates him at his headquarters in North Africa.

Impressed by her beauty, warrior skills, and determination and ability to locate him, he promotes her as his right hand associate and they go on adventures together. Ra's is so impressed with her abilities, he even allows Nyssa to use his Lazarus Pits. Like her sister Talia, Nyssa eventually becomes disenchanted with Ra's genocidal plans to "cleanse the Earth", and disassociates herself from her father sometime in the early 20th century. Ra's reluctantly approves this, believing that she will return to him and that she or her children will become his future heirs. To his disappointment, Nyssa refuses to give herself or her family to him, causing him to disown her permanently. He does however allow her to keep a Lazarus Pit for herself which helps her survive until the modern times.

=== The Second World War ===
During World War II, Nyssa and her family are quickly sent to a concentration camp, where Nyssa's family is killed. Nyssa herself is experimented on and rendered infertile. At one point she begs Ra's for help, but he declines to offer any.

=== Death and the Maidens ===
Broken by her horrifying experiences during this time, and enraged that Ra's has abandoned her and her family to die at the hands of the Nazis, Nyssa is finally motivated to act when her great-grandson – her last living descendant – is killed. She plots to kill Ra's by befriending, kidnapping, and brainwashing Talia and using her to kill Ra's. To this end, she captures Talia and, using a Lazarus Pit, kills and resurrects her in rapid succession. Rendered apathetic by her time in the camp, unable to feel anything, Nyssa attempts to destroy all hope and optimism in the world by assassinating Superman with kryptonite bullets, hoping that, by uniting the world in one moment of tragedy, she will manage to rouse herself once more.

While Batman is successful in preventing the assassination of Superman, he is unable to stop Ra's from being killed by Nyssa. This in turn is part of a greater plan by Ra's to ensure that his daughters, both initially dissatisfied with his plans, will realize that he is right, and that they would come to accept their destinies as his heirs. Realizing and accepting this, both Nyssa and Talia become the heads of the League of Assassins.

=== Lazarus Pit ===
The Lazarus Pit can grant restorative properties that can heal injuries and even grant immortality. Nyssa owns one of the world's last Lazarus Pits, which has granted her longevity and the ability to heal her wounds; she survives the Holocaust thanks to its powers. She also found the ability to use the pit multiple times. She is also extremely wealthy, especially since she assumes control of Ra's' organization and joins forces with Talia. Like her father and half-sister, she knows every of Batman's secrets.

=== "Infinite Crisis" ===
During "Infinite Crisis", Nyssa and her sister connive to use Talia's membership in Luthor's Secret Society of Super Villains to take over the planet. Nyssa tries to recruit Batgirl (as Cassandra Cain) to stand at her side as "The One Who Is All". She attempts to explain why she is working with the villains of the Society to Batgirl:

"Vast stockpiles of food rot, while people starve. Millions die from curable diseases, while drug companies rake in the billions. Our environment chokes on our waste, becoming so toxic that life fails. It's genocide by greed, apathy, and neglect. These are the real crimes. Something must change... The Society's plans are vast. They will succeed. I can't stop them. When the world gets a true taste of violent oppression, and their heroes lie dead and broken – apathy will die. That's when you'll lead my league to sanction key society members. Leaving Talia and I to lead the revolution. A new world will be born, one of peace and equality. Millions of lives will be saved".

Cassandra refuses and, along with Mr. Freeze, escapes from Nyssa's grasp.

In "One Year Later", Nyssa is seen in Northern Africa, planning an unknown plot with two terrorists. As she gets into her car to leave, it explodes. In the following issue, Lady Shiva reports that Nyssa Raatko is dead, probably killed by the League of Assassins.

=== Post-Rebirth ===
Nyssa Raatko is reintroduced in the 2025 series Batgirl. In the series Cheetah and Cheshire Rob the Justice League, it is revealed that Nyssa had a daughter named Alya Raatko, alias Featherweight, who is transgender.

== In other media ==
=== Television ===
Katrina Law as Nyssa al Ghul in Arrow.

- Nyssa al Ghul appears in a number of series set in the Arrowverse, portrayed by Katrina Law, in which she is portrayed as a lesbian.
  - First appearing in the second season of Arrow, this version rescued Sara Lance from Lian Yu, recruiting her into the League of Assassins as well as become her beloved. Additionally, Nyssa goes on to train Sara's sister Laurel Lance and dismantle the League of Assassins.
  - Nyssa appears in a flashback in the Legends of Tomorrow episode "River of Time".
  - Nyssa appears in the tie-in comic Crisis on Infinite Earths Giant.
- Nyssa al Ghul appears in the fifth season of Gotham, portrayed by Jaime Murray. This version initially works undercover as the Secretary of Homeland Security, Theresa Walker, and employs Bane, Riddler, Leslie Thompkins, and Hugo Strange.

=== Film ===
Nyssa Raatlo makes a cameo appearance in Batman vs. Teenage Mutant Ninja Turtles, via photographs.

=== Video games ===
Nyssa Raatko appears in the Batman: Arkham Knight DLC "Season of Infamy", voiced by Jennifer Hale. This version is the leader of a rebel faction within the League of Assassins who opposes Ra's al Ghul's resurrection. Depending on the player's choices, she can either be killed by a resurrected Ra's or take command of the League.
