= List of Secret Six members =

The Secret Six is the name of six distinct, fictional comic book teams in the DC Comics Universe. Each team has had six members, led by a mysterious figure named Mockingbird, whom the characters assume to be one of the six themselves.

== First team (1968–1969) ==
- August Durant
- Lili de Neuve
- Carlo di Rienzi
- Tiger Force (Mike Tempest)
- Crimson Dawn (Kit Dawn or Kim Dawn)
- King Savage

== Second team (1988–1989) ==
- August Durant
- Mitch Hoberman
- Ladonna Jameal
- Tony Mantegna
- Luke McKendrick
- Vic Sommers
- Dr. Maria Verdugo

== Third team (2005–2011) ==
- Cheshire
- Deadshot
- Fiddler
- A Parademon
- Rag Doll
- Scandal Savage
- Catman
- Knockout
- Mad Hatter
- Harley Quinn
- Bane
- Jeannette
- Black Alice
- King Shark
- Dwarfstar
- Lady Vic
- Giganta

== Fourth team, New 52 (2015-2016) ==
- Catman
- Black Alice
- Strix
- Ventriloquist (Shauna Belzer)
- Porcelain
- Big Shot

== Fifth team, The Infected ==
- The Commissioner (Jim Gordon)
- King Shazam (Billy Batson/Shazam)
- Scarab (Jaime Reyes/Blue Beetle)
- Deathbringer (Donna Troy)
- Supergirl (Kara Zor-El)
- Sky Tyrant (Carter Hall/Hawkman)
- The Batman Who Laughs

== Sixth team, All-In (2025-Present) ==
- Catman
- Deadshot
- Black Alice
- Superman
- Gossamer
- Dreamer
