= Amos Fortune (character) =

Professor Amos Fortune

Publication information
- Publisher: DC Comics
- First appearance: Justice League of America #6 (August–September 1961)
- Created by: Gardner Fox; Mike Sekowsky

In-story information
- Full name: Amos Fortune
- Team affiliations: Secret Society of Super Villains; Royal Flush Gang
- Notable aliases: Ace of Clubs; Mister Memory; Professor Amos Fortune; Wild Card "Pudge"
- Abilities: Probability manipulation

Amos Fortune is a character appearing in American comic books published by DC Comics. He is a known enemy of the Justice League.

== Publication history ==
Amos Fortune first appeared in Justice League of America #6 (August–September 1961) and was created by Gardner Fox and Mike Sekowsky.

== Fictional character biography ==
As a child, Fortune was the leader of a gang of juvenile delinquents. As an adult, he becomes obsessed with luck, both good and bad, and discovers the existence of "luck glands" in human beings that control their luck. Upon learning how to control the glands to manipulate his luck, Fortune gathers his old gang and creates the original Royal Flush Gang, who battle the Justice League on two occasions.

In a story that Rainbow Raider told Sonar, Amos Fortune is among the villains gathered by Brain Wave to join the Secret Society of Super Villains. After the Justice League confronts the villains outside their meeting place, it is revealed that Brain Wave was Martian Manhunter in disguise as part of a Justice League plot to get all the villains in one place and defeat them. It is uncertain whether this tale actually happened, but there may have been some embellishment.

In Villains United, the House of Secrets is destroyed by a Parademon. In the ensuing explosion, Fortune suffers injuries that leave him blind in one eye and half his face disfigured. He is imprisoned in the prison Enclave M, with his attempt to escape being thwarted by the Secret Six. Interrogated by Knockout while dangling out of a helicopter, Fortune reveals that the fact that Alexander Luthor Jr.'s Secret Society is planning an all-out assault on Metropolis. After insulting Knockout's lover Scandal Savage, Fortune is thrown from the helicopter and seemingly killed.

In JSA Classified, it is revealed that Fortune survived and is masterminding a plot against the JSA using the Wizard as a focusing point for luck magi to destroy the JSA, using Wildcat as his mind-controlled pawn. Fortune's origin was revised and revisited in Justice League #35-37; he became obsessed with playing cards and luck upon the death of his father, a gambler who was murdered by the mob after he failed to pay a debt. Growing up in poverty and tormented over his weight, Fortune developed a ruthless streak as he used his knowledge of games of chance to fleece his classmates of their money. The original Royal Flush Gang were retconned as his enforcers and fellow gang members. Fortune is later killed by the widow of Two of Clubs, a gangster who he had killed earlier.

In The New 52 continuity reboot, Amos Fortune is a corporate executive who gains superpowers from exposure to the Amazo virus that was created by Lex Luthor. Additionally, he is unconnected to the Royal Flush Gang.

== Powers and abilities ==
Amos Fortune is a talented gambler and can manipulate the luck.

=== Equipment ===
Amos Fortune makes use of the Stimu-Luck machine that helps to manipulate the luck of others. He also wields animated tarot cards that enable him to summon the Tarot Gang.

== In other media ==
- Amos Fortune appears in the tenth season of Smallville, portrayed by James Kidnie. This version is a casino owner.
- Amos Fortune appears as a character summon in Scribblenauts Unmasked: A DC Comics Adventure.
