= Secret Six (comics) =

Name for multiple fictional teams in DC Comics

- Promotional art for Secret Six (vol. 3) #10 (Aug. 2009) by Daniel LuVisi, featuring (from top) Bane, the Rag Doll, the Catman, Deadshot, Scandal Savage, and Jeannette.

Group publication information
- Publisher: DC Comics
- First appearance: (1960s); Secret Six #1 (May 1968) (1980s); Action Comics Weekly #601 (May 1988) (2000s); Villains United #1 (July 2005)
- Created by: (1960s); E. Nelson Bridwell (writer); Frank Springer (artist) (1980s); Martin Pasko (writer); Dan Spiegle (artist) (2000s/2010s); Gail Simone (writer); Dale Eaglesham (artist); Brad Walker (artist); Nicola Scott (artist); 2020s Nicole Maines (writer); Stephen Segovia (artist)

In-story information
- Base(s): (1980s); San Francisco (2000s); House of Secrets

Roster
- See: List of Secret Six members

Secret Six
- : Secret Six #1 (May 1968). Unusually, the story begins on the cover; art by Frank Springer.

Series publication information
- Publisher: DC Comics
- Schedule: (vol. 1); Bi-monthly (vols. 2–5); Monthly
- Format: (vols. 1, 3, and 4); Ongoing series (vols. 2, and 5); Limited series
- Genre: (vol. 1); Action/Adventure; Mystery (vols. 2–5); Superhero
- Publication date: (vol. 1); April/May 1968 – April/May 1969 (vol. 2); July 2006 – January 2007 (vol. 3); November 2008 – October 2011 (vol. 4); December 2014 – May 2016 (vol. 5); March – August 2025
- Number of issues: (vol. 1); 7 (vol. 2); 6 (vol. 3); 36 (vol. 4); 14 (vol. 5); 6
- Creator(s): (1960s); E. Nelson Bridwell (writer); Frank Springer (artist) (1980s); Martin Pasko (writer); Dan Spiegle (artist) (2000s/2010s); Gail Simone (writer); Dale Eaglesham (artist); Brad Walker (artist); Nicola Scott (artist); 2020s Nicole Maines (writer); Stephen Segovia (artist)

Collected editions
- Villains United: ISBN 1-4012-0838-X
- Secret Six: Six Degrees of Devastation: ISBN 1-4012-1231-X
- Birds of Prey: Dead of Winter: ISBN 1-4012-2327-3
- Secret Six: Unhinged: ISBN 1-4012-2327-3
- Secret Six: Depths: ISBN 1-4012-2599-3
- Secret Six: Danse Macabre: ISBN 1-4012-2904-2
- Secret Six: Cat's in the Cradle: ISBN 1-4012-3021-0
- Secret Six: The Reptile Brain: ISBN 1-4012-3166-7
- Secret Six Vol. 1: Villains United: ISBN 1-4012-5075-0
- Secret Six Vol. 2: Money For Murder: ISBN 1-4012-5537-X

The Secret Six is the name of three different fictional teams appearing in American comic books published by DC Comics, plus an alternate universe's fourth team. Each team has had six members, led by a mysterious figure named Mockingbird, whom the characters assume to be one of the other five members. The third, anti-heroic incarnation of the Secret Six was rated by IGN as the fourth Best Comic Run of the Decade in 2012.

== Publication history ==
=== Original Secret Six ===
The Secret Six first appeared during the Silver Age of Comic Books in the initial team's seven-issue title Secret Six (May 1968 – May 1969).

Unusually, the premiere issue's story began on the cover, and continued on the interior's page one. This strike team of covert operatives consisted of August Durant, Lili de Neuve, Carlo di Rienzi, Mike Tempest, Crimson Dawn, and King Savage.

Created by writer E. Nelson Bridwell and artist Frank Springer, the ongoing series ceased publication with the identity of Mockingbird unrevealed. The first two issues were reprinted in The Brave and the Bold #117 and #120 (March and July 1975).

=== Secret Six revived ===
The revived Secret Six, in Action Comics Weekly #612 (August 9, 1988). Cover art by Paul Gulacy.

Writer Martin Pasko and artist Dan Spiegle introduced an updated version of the team as an eight-page feature in the anthology title Action Comics Weekly #601 (May 24, 1988).

They revealed Mockingbird as Durant, who now reunited the team after twenty years while also assembling a new team consisting of Mitch Hoberman, Ladonna Jameal, Tony Mantegna, Luke McKendrick, Vic Sommers, and Dr. Maria Verdugo. The following issue saw the entire first team, including Durant, die. The feature ran through Action Comics Weekly #612 (August 9, 1988), with DiRienzi succeeding Durant as Mockingbird.

Longtime comic-book letterer Clem Robins has said that Secret Six originator Bridwell did not have Durant in mind as Mockingbird:

When I first began freelancing for DC in 1977, I was introduced to E. Nelson Bridwell, who wrote every Secret Six story [to that time] and originated the concept. I took him aside and asked him point-blank who Mockingbird actually was, since the book was cancelled before the issue could ever be resolved. Bridwell told me who Mockingbird was, and explained his logic in choosing that particular character.

A second arc of this team, by writer Pasko and original Silver Age artist Springer, ran in Action Comics Weekly #619–630 (September 27 – December 13, 1988). DiRienzi died, and his son Rafael disappeared amid intimations that he may be the successor Mockingbird.

=== Gail Simone's Secret Six ===
==== Infinite Crisis (Villains United) ====
The next version of the team was introduced in Villains United #1 (July 2005). Unlike previous versions of the team, the new Secret Six consists mainly of villainous characters who undertake missions of dubious moral quality and often resulting in a high body count. The team consists of the pre-existing DC characters Catman, Deadshot, and Cheshire, and the newly created Rag Doll, Scandal Savage, and a Parademon. Another member, the Fiddler, is killed by Deadshot on order of Mockingbird. Later, the Parademon is killed and Cheshire betrays the group to the Secret Society of Super Villains, and was shot by the Society's Deathstroke, who does not trust her for being a traitor (Cheshire eventually turns up alive, plotting revenge). The Mockingbird for this version of the team is eventually revealed to be Lex Luthor.

In the 2006 Secret Six limited series, (written by Gail Simone with art by Brad Walker and Jimmy Palmiotti), Knockout, who was revealed as a mole infiltrating the Society in Villains United, has officially joined the group to be with her lover, Scandal. At the end of issue #1, Catman asks the Mad Hatter to be the sixth member of the group. While Catman meets with the Mad Hatter, Doctor Psycho orchestrates a series of attacks designed to wipe out the Six. The Hatter is literally kicked off the team by Rag Doll, who says that one eccentric fop in the group is enough. His replacement is Harley Quinn, who later quits.

In Birds of Prey #104–108, the Secret Six face off against Oracle's Birds of Prey in Russia for the soul of Tora (Ice). After Harley Quinn quit the team, they disbanded. Subsequently, in Birds of Prey #109, Knockout was attacked and killed by the same assassin who had been stalking the New Gods and killing them off, one by one. Earlier in the issue, Knockout comments in passing that Catman was going soft, and Deadshot had returned to the Suicide Squad. Harley Quinn is reformed in Countdown #43. Scandal Savage, Rag Doll, and Catman were later seen in Salvation Run.

==== Ongoing series ====
DC launched a new Secret Six series in September 2008, reuniting Catman, Deadshot, Scandal Savage, and Rag Doll, and adding Bane (hinted at by Simone months earlier as "an A-list Batman villain") and an original character named Jeannette, who appeared in the third issue. The Six have been hired to retrieve Tarantula from Alcatraz Island, and find a card which she stole from "Junior", a mysterious villain who supposedly runs the entire West Coast mob. This Junior has practically the entire villain community at her beck and call, all afraid of her, even those in Arkham Asylum. The Six later learn that the card in question was made by Neron, and says "Get Out of Hell Free". Soon, the Six are attacked by a small army of supervillains, all wanting to recover the card and collect the reward of $20 million for each of the Six, under the orders of Junior, who captures and tortures Bane, whose strong principles and moral convictions, paired with his fatherly fondness of Scandal, keep him from betraying his new team. It is later revealed that Junior is Rag Doll's sister and a daughter of the first Rag Doll. She has the ghastly appearance of an old clown, with sliced skin and eyes stitched wide open to give the appearance of a clown. The Six escape and head for Gotham City, with Deadshot seemingly betraying them and leaving with Tarantula. The Six manage to catch up to Deadshot and are attacked by Junior, the supervillains, and the Mad Hatter, who is revealed to be the one who hired them simply so they would be killed. Tarantula sacrifices herself by pulling herself and Junior in front of the supervillains' combined attack, seemingly destroying the card along with them. It is later shown that Scandal is now in possession of it.

Although the current incarnation of the Secret Six are technically supervillains, several members of the team are treated sympathetically and come across as heroic, if only on the virtue of the team encountering individuals who are even more bloodthirsty and villainous.

In a new storyline starting with issue #10 titled "Depths", the Six have been hired by a new villain named Mr. Smyth, a slave trader. He is building what he hopes will be the world's biggest and only prison. He is also holding the Amazon Artemis of Bana-Mighdall prisoner. Jeannette breaks her out and was met with opposition from the rest of the team, who in the middle of battling with each other are interrupted by Wonder Woman. The Six one-by-one turn on Smyth and free all the slaves he possessed on his Devil's Island, ending with Deadshot killing Smyth in cold blood. Disappointed in the repetitive failed progress the team's missions have had since joining, Bane takes over as team leader with the approval of half the team. His first directive is to remove Scandal Savage as a team member and replace her with Black Alice. After Catman flees to find the murderers of his son, he is followed by Rag Doll, Alice, Deadshot, and Scandal. Bane and Jeannette replace them with King Shark, Dwarfstar, Lady Vic, and Giganta.

John Ostrander guest-wrote Secret Six (vol. 3) #15 (January 2010), featuring Deadshot, and #23 (September 2010), a super-powered version take on "The Most Dangerous Game".

The series has also had three crossovers with other DC titles. In 2010, Simone teamed with John Ostrander for "Danse Macabre", a crossover with Ostrander's acclaimed 1980s title Suicide Squad, which had been "resurrected" and given one additional issue as part of DC's company-wide Blackest Night crossover event. The crossover involved the Six being hired by an anonymous party (in reality Amanda Waller) to break into Belle Reve prison in order to rescue an inmate, only to discover that the mission was a trap set in place so that the Suicide Squad could apprehend the team and kidnap Deadshot. The crossover began in Suicide Squad #67 and subsequently ran through Secret Six (vol. 3) #17-18, and eventually reached a climax where both teams were forced to work together to fight off a Black Lantern invasion. In January 2011, Simone collaborated with Paul Cornell on a two-part crossover which began in Action Comics #896 and ended in Secret Six (vol. 3) #29, which saw the Six being hired by Lex Luthor to assassinate Scandal's father Vandal Savage. In February of the same year, Simone took part in another two-issue crossover, this time with Keith Giffen's Doom Patrol for a storyline entitled "Suicide Roulette". The crossover, which took place in Secret Six (vol. 3) #30, and Doom Patrol (vol. 5) #19, saw the Secret Six come into conflict with the Doom Patrol after being hired to forcibly take over the team's home country of Oolong Island.

The book's final storyline featured Bane leading the Secret Six on an ill-fated mission to Gotham City, where they plan to kill Catwoman, Red Robin, Batgirl, and Azrael. However, upon their arrival the team is met by a veritable army of superheroes ranging from Green Lantern and the Huntress to the Justice League and the Teen Titans. Despite the overwhelming odds, the members of the Secret Six make one last stand before being defeated and incarcerated.

==== The New 52 ====
In September 2011, The New 52 rebooted DC's continuity. Secret Six was relaunched in December 2014 with Gail Simone returning as the writer. The series features a completely new line-up, save Catman and Black Alice, including Strix, the Ventriloquist (Shauna Belzer), Ralph Dibny under the alias of Big Shot, and a new character named Porcelain. In the third issue of the series the Riddler was revealed to be the Mockingbird, while Big Shot was revealed to be the Riddler's mole on the team. In the next issue, Scandal Savage, Rag Doll, and Jeannette appear acting as operatives of Mockingbird, tracking down the team, but later the three characters become allies to the Secret Six and turn on the Riddler.

=== The Batman Who Laughs' Secret Six ===
In the 2019 Batman/Superman series, The Batman Who Laughs uses Joker toxin-laced Batarangs to create dark and twisted versions of six individuals necessary to open a portal to the Dark Multiverse, those being Commissioner Gordon, Blue Beetle, Shazam, Donna Troy, Hawkman, and Supergirl. Superman had been the intended target, but Supergirl took the blow instead. After the portal is closed due to the combined efforts of Batman and Superman, the team (minus Gordon, who was apprehended shortly afterwards) does battle with Lex Luthor in the Year of the Villain: Hell Arisen miniseries. The team is disbanded when The Batman Who Laughs is injected with a cure for his serum, causing the Six to return to normal and turn on him before they are interrupted by Luthor teleporting him to the Godhead.

=== DC All In ===
Following the Absolute Power storyline, Superman (Jon Kent), Dreamer (Nia Nal), and Gossamer (Jay Nakamura) are recruited to form a new Secret Six team alongside Black Alice, Catman, and Deadshot. The six-issue miniseries, written by Nicole Maines with art by Stephen Segovia, debuted on March 5, 2025. Of the team lineup, Maines stated, “Getting to be part of DC All In and to tell a new story involving Jon Kent, Jay Nakamura, and Dreamer means the world to me. They’re all at a crossroads right now, at the start of their potential villain origin stories, so having them team up with these Secret Six veterans, all former villains, feels like a mirror into their futures.” Over the course of the series, the titular six are thrown together in a plot involving the attempted assassination of Amanda Waller and the US Government's attempts to access the secrets buried inside her mind by Dreamer. In the finale sixth issue, Jon and Jay break up with the revelation that the US Government sanctioned Amanda Waller's attack on the superhuman community that led to Jay's mother's death, with Jon refusing to help Jay overthrow the government in revenge.

== Other versions ==
=== Tangent Comics ===
An alternate universe iteration of the Secret Six appears in Tangent Comics, consisting of the Atom, the Flash, the Joker, the Spectre, Plastic Man, and Manhunter.

=== Tiny Titans ===
An alternate universe iteration of the Secret Six appear in Tiny Titans, consisting of Bane, Rag Doll, Jeannette, Scandal Savage, Catman, and Deadshot. This version of the group is a soccer team coached by Lobo.

=== Flashpoint ===
A group based on the Secret Six called the Secret Seven appear in a self-titled Flashpoint tie-in miniseries, consisting of Shade, Abra Kadabra, Amethyst, the Enchantress, Mindwarp, Raven, and Zatanna. Additionally, Klarion the Witch Boy and Black Orchid appear as previous members who were killed prior to the miniseries. This version of the group are part of a secret organization of magic-users. The Enchantress manipulates Shade into dismantling the Seven on the Amazons' behalf, leading to Kadabra publicly denouncing the group and the other members' deaths.

== Collected editions ==
The stories have been collected into trade paperbacks:

- Villains United (collects six-issue limited series, 144 pages, DC Comics, January 2006, ISBN 1-4012-0838-X)
- Birds of Prey: Dead of Winter (collects Birds of Prey #104–108, 128 pages, DC Comics, February 2008, ISBN 1-4012-1641-2)
- Secret Six:
  - Six Degrees of Devastation (collects six-issue limited series, 144 pages, DC Comics, March 2008, ISBN 1-4012-1231-X)
  - Unhinged (collects Secret Six (vol. 3) #1–7, 168 pages, DC Comics, August 2009, ISBN 1-4012-2327-3)
  - Depths (collects Secret Six (vol. 3) #8–14, 168 pages, DC Comics, April 2010, ISBN 1-4012-2599-3)
  - Danse Macabre (collects Secret Six (vol. 3) #15–18 and Suicide Squad #67, 128 pages, DC Comics, October 2010, ISBN 1-4012-2904-2)
  - Cat's in the Cradle (collects Secret Six (vol. 3) #19–24, 144 pages, DC Comics, January 2011, ISBN 1-4012-3021-0)
  - The Reptile Brain (collects Secret Six (vol. 3) #25–29 and Action Comics #896, 144 pages, DC Comics, May 2011, ISBN 1-4012-3166-7)
  - The Darkest House (collects Secret Six (vol. 3) #30–36 and Doom Patrol (vol. 5) #19, 176 pages, DC Comics, January 2012, ISBN 978-1-4012-3362-4)
- Secret Six Vol. 1: Villains United (collects Villains United six-issue limited series, Villains United: Infinite Crisis Special #1, Secret Six six-issue limited series; 328 pages, DC Comics, February 2014, ISBN 1-4012-5075-0)
- Secret Six Vol. 2: Money for Murder (collects Secret Six (vol. 3) #1-14; 336 pages, DC Comics, May 2015, ISBN 978-1-4012-5537-4)
- Secret Six Vol. 3: Cat's Cradle (collects Secret Six (vol. 3) #15-24 and Suicide Squad #67; 336 pages, DC Comics, October 2015, ISBN 978-1-4012-5861-0)
- Secret Six Vol. 4: Caution to the Wind (collects Secret Six (vol. 3) #25-36, Action Comics #897 and Doom Patrol (vol. 5) #19, 336 pages, DC Comics, April 2016, ISBN 978-1-4012-6090-3)
- Secret Six by Gail Simone Omnibus Vol. 1 (collects Villains United #1-6, Villains United: Infinite Crisis Special #1, Birds of Prey #104–109, Secret Six (vol. 2) #1-6, Secret Six (vol. 3) #1–16, stories from 52 #28 and Countdown #22; 848 pages, DC Comics, June 2024, ISBN 1-77952-595-8)
- Secret Six (The New 52):
  - Secret Six Vol. 1: Friends in Low Places (collects Secret Six (vol. 4) #1-6 and the sneak peek story from Convergence: Wonder Woman #2; 144 pages, DC Comics, February 2016, ISBN 978-1-4012-5485-8)
  - Secret Six Vol. 2: The Gauntlet (collects Secret Six (vol. 4) #7-14; 144 pages, DC Comics, December 2016, ISBN 978-1-4012-6453-6)

== In other media ==
In 2018, Suits's Rick Muirragui was attached to write and produce a Secret Six TV series with Bill Lawrence's Doozer Productions for CBS. No production updates were provided after its reveal.
