= Villains United =

2005 DC Comics limited series

- Cover to Villains United #1, art by J.G. Jones.

Publication information
- Publisher: DC Comics
- Schedule: Monthly
- Format: Limited series
- Genre: Superhero
- Publication date: (Limited series) July - December 2005 (Infinite Crisis Special #1) April 2006
- No. of issues: 6, with 1 Infinite Crisis Special
- Main character(s): Secret Six; Secret Society of Super Villains

Creative team
- Created by: Secret Six created by E. Nelson Bridwell; Frank Springer
- Written by: Gail Simone
- Artist(s): Dale Eaglesham; Val Semeiks
- Inker(s): Wade Von Grawbadger; Prentis Rollins

Collected editions
- Villains United: ISBN 1-4012-0838-X

Villains United is a six-issue 2005 comic book limited series, published by DC Comics, written by Gail Simone and illustrated by Dale Eaglesham and Wade Von Grawbadger, and later by Val Semeiks and Prentis Rollins.

== Publication history ==
Villains United is one of four miniseries leading up to DC Comics' Infinite Crisis event and a seven-issue miniseries. This story follows the evolution of the latest incarnation of the Secret Six, and the group's ongoing battle with Secret Society of Super Villains.

Like all major intracompany events, this series ties in with several monthly DC Comics titles, including:

Action Comics #830-831
Batman: Gotham Knights #66
Breach #7
Firestorm #17
Nightwing #109-110
Superman #221
Catwoman #46-49
Green Arrow #50
Flash #225

== Plot summary ==
Lex Luthor assembles an army of villains consisting of over two hundred members, with a six-member core team consisting of Luthor, Talia al Ghul, Doctor Psycho, Deathstroke, Black Adam, and Calculator. Nevertheless, not all the villains offered a chance to join this army are thrilled with this idea. Catman has joined a team of five supported by the mysterious Mockingbird including Cheshire, Deadshot, Scandal Savage, Rag Doll, and Parademon to oppose this new Secret Society. Catman replaced the first Fiddler, after he was killed by Deadshot on Mockingbird's orders when Mockingbird felt he had not fulfilled his part in a mission.

Late one night in the mansion of the Secret Six, Catman and Deadshot have a discussion about their unknown leader, Mockingbird, and about the dramatic change in Catman's life, while Cheshire secretly listens in the shadows. Afterwards, Scandal informs everyone that Mockingbird has assigned them to steal Thanagarian weaponry from a tanker in Gotham harbor.

Upon their arrival at the tanker, the Six are ambushed and captured by members of the Society. The Crime Doctor tortures the Six, asking them, among other questions, the identity of Mockingbird. After a few rounds of torture, Catman breaks free and rescues his teammates. While escaping, the Six decide to send the Society a message and murder Hyena.

The Six infiltrate a Society installation in Brazil. After fighting their way through a legion of H.I.V.E. troopers, they discover the Society's plans for the "Vindication Scenario": erasing the memories of all of Earth's superheroes. The facility is a giant battery, powered by Firestorm and Gehenna. The Six release Firestorm just as Black Adam arrives with a response team, and the facility is destroyed.

A short time later, the Society mounts a final strike on the Secret Six. The Society storms through the castle, and Cheshire is shot by Deathstroke. Catman and Rag Doll escape from Black Adam's group while Parademon blows up himself, Rag Doll and the battleground. Deathstroke and Deadshot duel, ultimately shooting each other at the same time. To save his daughter Scandal, Vandal Savage infiltrates the Society's headquarters and threatens to kill Luthor if he does not disengage the attack against the Six. Reluctantly, and over Black Adam's objections, Luthor ends the battle. Deadshot is led to medical help by the surviving members of the Secret Six. During the battle, the Six learn that Mockingbird is Lex Luthor and that the Luthor who organized the Secret Society is Alexander Luthor Jr., the son of the Earth-Three Luthor.

== Villains United: Infinite Crisis Special ==
In Villains United: Infinite Crisis Special #1, the Secret Six meet to discuss their future as a team, with Deadshot recommending they be an amoral mercenary team. They participate in the battle of Metropolis and decide to remain neutral, even after the battle. In phase one of a master plan, the Society executes "Operation: Hope Abandoned", engineering breakouts at metahuman holding facilities worldwide. Oracle masses responses as fast as possible, but with the "Big Guns" of the Justice League unavailable, the heroes are having problems just holding the line. Contacting the Martian Manhunter, Oracle organizes a global telepathic link.

Meanwhile, the Secret Six intercept the Scarecrow and Amos Fortune fleeing Enclave M, and discover that all supervillains, once freed, are to head to Metropolis. They relay this information to Green Arrow, who informs Martian Manhunter. Lady Blackhawk commandeers aircraft to traffic all available heroes and National Guardsmen to Metropolis. High above the battle, Catman informs the rest of the Six they are to remain neutral, even after the battle. The Six leave, determined to be an independent group, while the battle continues.

== Society's roster ==
See List of Secret Society of Super Villains members

== Collected editions ==
The series has been collected into a trade paperback:

- Villains United (collects Villains United #1-6, 144 pages, January 2006, ISBN 1-4012-0838-X)
- Secret Six Vol. 1: Villains United (collects the Villains United six-issue miniseries, Villains United: Infinite Crisis Special #1 and the Secret Six six-issue miniseries; 328 pages, DC Comics, February 2014, ISBN 1-4012-5075-0)

The one-shot special was also collected in Infinite Crisis Companion (ISBN 1-4012-0922-X).
