= Lady Vic =

- Portion of the panel from Batwing #24 (October 2013); art by Eber Ferreira (penciller), Eduardo Pansica (inker), and Paul Mounts (colorist).

Publication information
- Publisher: DC Comics
- First appearance: Nightwing (vol. 2) #4 (January 1997)
- Created by: Chuck Dixon (writer); Scott McDaniel (artist)

In-story information
- Alter ego: Lady Elaine Marsh-Morton
- Team affiliations: Tartarus; Injustice League; Secret Society of Super Villains; Secret Six
- Notable aliases: Lady Victim
- Abilities: Highly skilled acrobat and martial artist Proficient with variety of edged weapons and firearms

Lady Elaine Marsh-Morton, a.k.a. "Lady Vic" or "Lady Victim" is a supervillain appearing in American comic books published by DC Comics. She is an English noblewoman who works secretly as an assassin, bounty hunter, and mercenary. She is employed on a semi-regular basis by Roland Desmond and appears most frequently as an antagonist of Nightwing (Dick Grayson).

Her sobriquet "Lady Vic" is short for "Lady Victim", referring to any of her possible targets.

Lady Vic appears in a self-titled episode of Titans, portrayed by Kimberly-Sue Murray.

== Publication history ==
Lady Vic first appeared in Nightwing (vol. 2) #4 and was created by Chuck Dixon and Scott McDaniel.

== Fictional character biography ==
Lady Elaine is descended from a long line of British soldiers and mercenaries, and a genuine English aristocrat. The money she earns from her secret career helps prevent foreclosure on her impoverished family estate.

Lady Vic completes an assignment for Blüdhaven gang boss Antonio Marin and returns to Blüdhaven to collect her fee, and is upset to find Marin missing. She tracks down Marin's lawyer and threatens to kill his young daughter if she is not paid—a threat she definitely would have carried out if Nightwing had not intervened. Dudley Soames informs her that Marin had been replaced by Blockbuster and offers to pay her fee, with a retainer to continue working for him.

During the Infinite Crisis, Lady Vic appeared as a member of Alexander Luthor Jr.'s Secret Society of Super Villains.

One Year Later, Lady Vic is hired by Doctor Psycho and Cheshire in an attempt to destroy the Secret Six. Together with Double Dare, she faces Deadshot in a park with his wife and child, who run away once the attackers appear. Unarmed, Deadshot is easily defeated by Double Dare and is about to be executed by Vic when his wife throws him a gun, allowing him to get the upper hand. Deadshot considers killing his would-be assassins but allows them to escape, not wanting to shoot them in front of his daughter.

Lady Vic was later seen among the new Injustice League and is one of the villains featured in Salvation Run. She also appears chasing the Secret Six to obtain a valuable "Get Out of Hell Free" card. Shortly after, Bane takes her on in his incarnation of the Six when the others leave.

== Powers and abilities ==
Lady Vic is a highly skilled martial artist and athlete, and equally skilled with firearms. She has a sentimental preference for a collection of antique weapons handed down by her ancestors, souvenirs of their colonial exploits: a matched pair of katar (कटार), a Japanese katana, a Thuggee strangling cloth, a Maasai javelin, and a Webley revolver.

When Blockbuster decided to test Shrike's abilities by pitting him against all of his regular assassins at once, Vic lasted the longest and was the only one to actually inflict a wound on him, almost killing him, before being knocked out. Vic also nearly defeated Nightwing in their first fight and had an upper hand in the battle.

== In other media ==
Lady Vic appears in a self-titled episode of Titans, portrayed by Kimberly-Sue Murray.
