= Rag Doll (Peter Merkel Jr.) =

Publication information
- Publisher: DC Comics
- First appearance: Villains United #1 (July 2005)
- Created by: Gail Simone (writer); Dale Eaglesham (artist)

In-story information
- Alter ego: Peter Merkel Jr.
- Team affiliations: Secret Six
- Abilities: Contortionist; Adequate hand-to-hand combatant

Rag Doll (Peter Merkel Jr.) is a supervillain and anti-hero in the DC Comics universe. He first appeared in Villains United #1 (July 2005), and was created by Gail Simone and Dale Eaglesham. He is a member of the Secret Six and the son of the original Rag Doll, Peter Merkel.

== Publication history ==
Rag Doll was introduced in the 2005 series Villains United as a member of the Secret Six, which were reintroduced in the same series. The character went on to appear in several volumes of the Secret Six's self-titled series.

Rag Doll is implied to be non-binary; he once took on a role and costume similar to Robin within the Secret Six, calling himself the "Boy/Girl Wonder". In post-Rebirth continuity, the character is explicitly identified as non-binary, with Bane referring to them with they/them pronouns.

== Fictional character biography ==
Peter Merkel Jr. is the son of Peter Merkel, the original Rag Doll. Born without superhuman abilities, Peter underwent surgery to implant lubricated cybernetic joints that let him emulate his father's superhuman agility. The surgery left him disfigured and requiring regular doses of emollient to lubricate his skin and prevent his bones from cutting through his flesh. He also surgically removed his genitals, which he considered a "bother". A member of the Secret Six, an antiheroic team, Rag Doll has a strange relationship with a Parademon who refers to him as "Clown". It considers itself Rag Doll's guard-dog, threatening to hurt or kill anyone who threatens him. The Parademon is killed while protecting the Secret Six during a battle with the Secret Society of Super Villains.

The Six, with new members Jeannette and Bane, are hired to retrieve a card that will supposedly allow its owner out of Hell free. They are attacked by many supervillains who want the card; most of them are acting under orders from Junior, a mysterious mob boss who controls the West Coast. In a confrontation, it is revealed that Junior is Rag Doll's sister Alex.

After Bane declares himself the new leader of the Six and fires Scandal Savage, the group adds Black Alice, a goth teen with the power to copy the abilities of magic users. After Alice infiltrates a cult and is uncovered, Rag Doll saves her life and she begins a flirtation with him, to Bane's chagrin. When Catman's son is targeted for murder, all of the pre-existing team members leave the Six to help Catman after he steals their plane, leaving Bane and Jeanette to create a temporary Six until the others return. On their journey to South Africa to try to find Catman, he is shocked to discover that Alice considers Rag Doll her boyfriend and attacks Scandal in the mistaken belief that she wants him. Alice summons Etrigan's powers to fight Scandal, but promptly gives up, turning back to normal in tears. She explains that she acted out from the strain and guilt of having inadvertently given her father cancer. Rag Doll attempts to offer her comfort, and when Deadshot takes it as an attempt to flirt with her, Rag Doll defends Alice.

Rag Doll accompanies the rest of the Secret Six when they go to Oolong Island to defeat the Doom Patrol and take over the island. He nearly kills Negative Man, but is defeated after being attacked by a seagull. While leaving the island, it is revealed that Rag Doll had captured Bumblebee. Before Rag Doll can leave the island with Bumblebee, she is rescued by Elasti-Girl.

It is later revealed that the Get Out Of Hell Free card that the Six had obtained was stolen from Scandal's safe, and Scandal correctly deduced that Rag Doll was the only one capable of stealing it. When Scandal confronts and almost kills him, Rag Doll reveals to her he stole the card hoping to use it to resurrect the Parademon, saying that Scandal's choice to use it for Knockout was misled and selfish. He uses the card to transport himself to Hell and set an ambush as his teammates were sure to follow. He explains that due to his emerging protectiveness of Black Alice, he had fled partly because of his fear of finally gaining a measure of sanity. He discovered after arriving that, due to being born without a soul, he was prophesied to rule in Hell, commanding a legion of demons. After the Six decide to fight for Knockout rather than becoming lords of the Underworld at Rag Doll's side, Blaze herself intervenes. After Rag Doll decides that Scandal's love is more important than his friendship with the Parademon, the team departs with Knockout in tow.

Following Bane's decisions to retake Gotham City, starting by eliminating several of Batman's closest allies, they are betrayed by the Penguin who was forcibly recruited due to his knowledge of Gotham's inner workings. A small army of superheroes arrive at the warehouse the Six are operating out of, and when given the choice to surrender they immediately fall to infighting. Rag Doll is the only one to understand that they have to stand together because they deserve each other. Deciding to go down fighting, they all ingest Venom, which Bane as a recovered user still carries. After a short but brutal battle, the Secret Six is taken down.

=== The New 52 ===
In The New 52 continuity reboot, Peter Merkel Jr. first appears as an inmate of Arkham Asylum. He is later hired to "kill" Barbara Gordon's roommate Alysia Yeoh and her friends, under the pretense that they are eco-terrorists. Operating as Rag Doll, he pursues Alysia, but Batgirl stops him and beats him. During the confrontation, Rag Doll realizes that the situation is a set-up. Later, he confronts and kills his employer for lying to him.

== Powers and abilities ==
Through a series of surgeries, Rag Doll had his biological joints replaced with artificial ones. These joints allow him to bend, compress, and contort in ways even master contortionists cannot. Rag Doll requires a special emollient to keep his artificial joints from tearing through his skin. He often wields a knife and is an adequate hand-to-hand fighter.

== Other versions ==
An alternate universe version of Rag Doll appears in the Flashpoint tie-in Deadman and the Flying Graysons. This version works at Haly's Circus before being killed in an Amazon attack.
