= Suicide Squad: Hell to Pay =

2018 film directed by Sam Liu

- Blu-ray cover
- Directed by: Sam Liu
- Written by: Alan Burnett
- Based on: Suicide Squad by: John Ostrander
- Produced by: Sam Liu
- Starring: Christian Slater; Vanessa Williams; Billy Brown
- Edited by: Christopher D. Lozinski
- Music by: Robert J. Kral
- Production companies: DC Entertainment; Warner Bros. Animation
- Distributed by: Warner Bros. Home Entertainment
- Release date: March 27, 2018
- Running time: 86 minutes
- Country: United States
- Language: English

Suicide Squad: Hell to Pay is a 2018 American adult animated superhero film produced by Warner Bros. Animation and distributed by Warner Bros. Home Entertainment. The film was produced and directed by Sam Liu and written by Alan Burnett (his last work before his retirement). It is the 32nd film of the DC Universe Animated Original Movies and the tenth film of the DC Animated Movie Universe. The voice cast includes Christian Slater as Deadshot, Vanessa Williams as Amanda Waller and Billy Brown as Ben Turner / Bronze Tiger. The film was released digitally on March 27, 2018, and on DVD and Blu-ray on April 10.

== Plot ==
Three years prior, Amanda Waller dispatches Task Force X, a black ops squad consisting of criminals with nanite bombs implanted in their heads, to retrieve a hard drive containing leaked intelligence from Tobias Whale. After succeeding in the mission, Count Vertigo and Jewelee attempt to steal the drive for themselves. Having overheard their intentions through the group's communication system, Waller uses Vertigo's bomb to kill him. Deadshot mercy-kills Jewelee to spare her from a similar death.

In the present, Waller is diagnosed with a terminal illness, but learns of the "Get Out of Hell Free" card: a powerful one-time-use relic said to grant access to heaven regardless of the sins committed in life, for whoever dies with the card on their person. Learning further that the card is in the possession of Steel Maxum, a former Doctor Fate, Waller recruits Deadshot, Harley Quinn, Captain Boomerang, Killer Frost, Copperhead, and Bronze Tiger to retrieve it. The squad locates Maxum at a strip club, but are confronted by Professor Zoom, Silver Banshee, and Blockbuster, who also seek the card. Despite heavy resistance, the squad takes advantage of an uncharacteristically slow Zoom to escape with Maxum, only to abandon him after learning that Scandal Savage and Knockout already stole the card on Vandal Savage's behalf.

The squad arrives at Scandal and Knockout's apartment, but are intercepted by Vandal and his men, who take the card and grievously injure Knockout. As they escape, Zoom secretly places a tracker on Vandal's airship. Deadshot breaks off from the squad trying to visit his daughter Zoe, but Tiger tracks him down and confronts him, forcing him to stay on the mission. After kidnapping Frost, removing her bomb, and convincing her to join them, Zoom's group uses her to lure the squad into a trap, wounding Tiger. They drop him off at a hospital before Scandal calls them to reveal Vandal's whereabouts as revenge for what happened to Knockout.

The squad locates Vandal, learning that he tasked Professor Pyg with surgically implanting the card inside his body in such a way that any attempt to remove it will kill him, thereby expending its magic. Zoom's group soon arrives and subdues everyone present. After Deadshot questions Zoom's ailing speed and reliance on underlings, Zoom reveals he was fatally shot by another timeline's Batman, (Note: As depicted in Justice League: The Flashpoint Paradox (2013).) but continuously draws energy from the Speed Force to delay the moment of his death, which limits the potency of his other powers. Unable to maintain that state forever, Zoom intends to possess the card before allowing himself to die. He uses his phasing ability to safely extract the card from Vandal's unconscious body. Frost then kills Banshee and Blockbuster in an attempt to take the card for herself, but Copperhead fights her until Waller detonates his bomb, killing them both.

Boomerang subsequently betrays the squad for the card, but Tiger arrives and stops him. Zoom incapacitates Boomerang and mortally wounds Tiger, taking the card back. Tiger uses the last of his strength to throw a knife at the hand of Zoom, who drops the card, allowing him to be gunned down by Deadshot. Deadshot places the card in the hands of Tiger, who dies. Deadshot completes the mission by delivering the now-useless card to an oblivious Waller. Having served his time, he finally visits Zoe.

== Voice cast ==
Voice actor	Character
Christian Slater	Floyd Lawton / Deadshot
Vanessa Williams	Amanda Waller
Billy Brown	Ben Turner / Bronze Tiger
Liam McIntyre	George Harkness / Captain Boomerang
Tara Strong	Harleen Quinzel / Harley Quinn
Kristin Bauer van Straten	Crystal Frost / Killer Frost
Gideon Emery	Sameer Park / Copperhead
C. Thomas Howell	Eobard Thawne / Professor Zoom / Reverse-Flash
Jim Pirri	Vandal Savage; Werner Zytle / Count Vertigo
Dania Ramirez	Scandal Savage
Dave Fennoy	Blockbuster; Tobias Whale; Black Manta; Police Officer
Greg Grunberg	Steel Maxum / Doctor Fate
Dave Boat	Harvey Dent / Two-Face; Punk 2
Trevor Devall	Punch; Punk 1
Cissy Jones	Knockout; Female Announcer
Julie Nathanson	Siobhan Smythe / Silver Banshee; Jewelee
James Urbaniak	Lazlo Valentin / Professor Pyg
Natalie Lander	Dharma
Matthew Mercer	Savage Gunman; Argus Scientist; Belle Reve Doctor

== Production ==
Suicide Squad: Hell to Pay was announced at San Diego Comic-Con in July 2017. It features an original story by Alan Burnett, marking his last film before retirement.

== Tie-in media ==
On March 21, a 12-issue digital comic was released on a weekly basis. Written by Jeff Parker with artwork by Matthew Dow Smith, Agustin Padilla, Stefano Raffaele, and Cat Staggs, the story takes place immediately after the events of the film as Amanda Waller is still looking to avoid death. With the Spectre bearing down on her, she enlists Jason Blood a.k.a. Etrigan into her team for their latest mission. The series was then released in a trade paperback collecting all 12 issues on February 13, 2019.

== Reception ==
=== Sales ===
Suicide Squad: Hell to Pay earned $851,440 from domestic DVD sales and $1,976,142 from domestic Blu-ray sales, bringing its total domestic home video earnings to $2,834,427.

=== Critical response ===
The review aggregator Rotten Tomatoes reported an approval rating of 88%, with an average score of 7.2/10, based on 8 reviews.

IGN awarded Suicide Squad: Hell to Pay a score of 7.5 out of 10, saying that while not everything in the film worked, it deserves praise for its "sense of humor, willingness to kill off key characters, and exploration of a spiritual subject". A Comicsverse review by Chris Zhang notes problems with graphics, but Zhang still calls it the best Suicide Squad film ever, noting it is giving a correct portrayal of the Squad as "a bunch of backstabbing criminals being managed by a backstabbing bureaucrat" instead of a comparatively friendly team like the 2016 film.

=== Accolades ===
The film was nominated for the Golden Reel Award for Outstanding Achievement in Sound Editing – Sound Effects, Foley, Music, Dialogue and ADR for Non-Theatrical Animated Long Form Broadcast Media award.
