= George Lawton =

George Lawton may refer to:

- George Lawton (antiquary) (1779–1869), English antiquarian
- George Lawton (canoeist) (1911–?), British Olympic canoeist
- George Lawton (footballer, born 1862) (1862–1930), English footballer for Stoke
- George Lawton (footballer, born 1880) (1880–?), English footballer for Stoke
- George Lawton (settler) (1607–1693), early settler of Portsmouth in the Colony of Rhode Island and Providence Plantations
- George M. Lawton (1886–1941), American football player and coach
- George Willis Lawton, American architect and partner at Saunders and Lawton
