= Black Alice (comics) =

- Black Alice as depicted in Birds of Prey #76 (January 2005). Art by Ed Benes.

Publication information
- Publisher: DC Comics
- First appearance: Birds of Prey #76 (January 2005)
- Created by: Gail Simone; Joe Prado; Ed Benes

In-story information
- Alter ego: Lori Zechlin
- Team affiliations: Secret Six; Night Force; Suicide Squad; Birds of Prey
- Abilities: Magic usurpation

Black Alice (Lori Zechlin) is a DC Comics character introduced in Birds of Prey #76 (January 2005). She uses her magical powers to prey on drug dealers in her hometown of Dayton, Ohio.

== Fictional character biography ==
=== Origin ===
Lori Zechlin is a teenager who lives with her father John and her mother. Neither Lori nor her father is aware that Mrs. Zechlin is addicted to prescription pharmaceuticals, which she purchases from local drug dealers. On the same day that her mother kills herself by overdosing on drugs, Lori discovers that she has the mystical ability to "borrow" the magical powers of other superheroes or supervillains. Lori (taking the name Black Alice) formulates a plan to avenge her mother's death and punish the prescription drug traffickers.

Following his wife's death, John Zechlin becomes depressed and reclusive, with Lori designating herself as his caregiver. Her grades begin to slip, and she becomes alienated from her peers. Lori's best friend Dawn, jealous of her growing powers, rejects her from their social group.

Having left Gotham City following the destruction of their clock tower headquarters, the Birds of Prey are traveling the country to identify and help previously unknown metahumans. Oracle sends Huntress, disguised as a civilian teacher, to watch over Lori, while Black Canary is tasked with determining the nature and strength of her powers. Oracle turns Lori over to the care of the real Doctor Fate, where she can receive guidance in the use of her powers.

=== Day of Vengeance ===
In Day of Vengeance, Shadowpact recruits Black Alice to battle the Spectre and Eclipso. After witnessing the death of the wizard Shazam and the destruction of the Rock of Eternity, she declines an offer to join Shadowpact, choosing to return to her father and her hometown.

=== The Society ===
Talia al Ghul, Felix Faust, and Cheetah attempt to get Black Alice to join the Secret Society of Super Villains, offering both training and the chance to resurrect her mother. Alice teleports everyone to the outskirts of Dayton and states that she wants to be left alone. She returns home with her parents, her mother apparently fully resurrected, but left in a state of shock that causes her to barely speak.

Lori's father turns alcoholic again due to his wife's condition, and Lori continues to be bullied at school. She summons the traveling helmet of Doctor Fate in an attempt to tame its powers. When the helmet starts to punish everyone who wrongs her, even her loved ones, Lori realizes that she does not need more power to attain happiness and gives up the helmet. When Oracle summons Black Alice to help the Birds of Prey again, she snaps when Oracle reveals that her mood swings are a side effect of the antidepressants she has been taking to restrain herself.

Black Alice is later kidnapped by Darkseid's henchmen and taken to the "Dark Side Club". Dosed with will-suppressing drugs and pitted against other teenaged metahumans, she discovers that her own drugs interfere with Darkseid's. Finding Misfit similarly trapped, but almost completely brainwashed, she briefly contemplates stealing Misfit's teleportation abilities to escape. After discovering in Darkseid's files that she may be a blood relative of Misfit, Alice has a change of heart and helps the girl escape.

A few weeks later, with a new school year beginning, Lori brings her rivalry to a new level. Transferring to Platinum Heights High School, she learns that Misfit is also a student, forced to attend by Oracle. While Misfit has a difficult time adapting, Lori's "exotic" lifestyle, perceived as rebellious and independent, gains the instant acceptance and adoration of the school's elite.

=== Secret Six and Blackest Night ===
Black Alice resurfaces again by following Deadshot and Catman, who had been hired to capture a child molester and bring him to the father of one of his victims. Alice confronts both Catman and Deadshot asking how much they pay. Following that she fights several policemen, as a trial of sorts, easily besting by stealing the powers of various magic users. She is accepted once she reveals that her father is sick and that she needs money. Catman is troubled by the fact that Alice is not disturbed at his actions and easily tends to violence.

On Alice's first official mission (taking place during the events of "Blackest Night"), she and the Secret Six are hired to free a drug kingpin from Belle Reve. Despite being enraged at the idea of helping a drug dealer, Alice participates in the attack on the prison, using the powers of Giganta to distract the guards while her teammates sneak in. It is revealed that the entire mission is a setup staged by the Suicide Squad to arrest the Six. Alice steals the powers of Suicide Squad member Nightshade and defeats both her and Count Vertigo. As Alice revels in her victory, a group of Black Lanterns attack her and the other Sixers. Her fear of them inhibits her control over her stolen powers until Bane's threat forces her to teleport the Six, Rick Flag, and Bronze Tiger to the House of Secrets. However, she brings the Black Lanterns with them and she refuses to return the power to Nightshade so she can teleport Amanda Waller to a place where she can find help. Waller knocks her out, and Nightshade takes her away only to return shortly with a Manhunter android containing the Green Lantern energy they need to destroy the Black Lanterns. Alice remains with the Six while the Squad leaves.

Some time later, Alice goes with Deadshot, Scandal, and Rag Doll to try to help Catman retrieve his kidnapped, and possibly murdered, infant son. All the four find are a trail of corpses Catman has left behind, the sight of which brings Alice to tears. Alice mistakenly believes that Scandal is after Rag Doll, whom she calls her "boyfriend" (while Rag Doll does not exactly feel the same way, he does care for Alice), despite the fact that Scandal is a lesbian. Alice summons Etrigan's abilities, turning into Estrogan, and fights Scandal. She then turns back to normal and tearfully apologizes. Alice explains that she had attempted to cure her father's asthma using Raven's healing abilities, but unsure of how to properly use them, believes she gave him cancer by mistake.

In May 2010, Alice began co-starring in a back-up feature in Teen Titans alongside Zachary Zatara and Traci Thirteen. Alice appears alongside fellow teen heroines Batgirl, Supergirl, Miss Martian, Lightning, Cyclone, Stargirl, Ravager, Misfit, and Terra as part of an all-female group of heroines gathered to battle Professor Ivo's army of robot sirens.

=== The New 52 ===
In The New 52 continuity reboot, Alice's origin is altered; her power now comes from a demon who inhabited her body when she was seemingly killed in a car accident that killed her parents.

== Powers and abilities ==
Black Alice possesses the ability to temporarily usurp the magical powers of any being regardless of how powerful they are, leaving her targets powerless in turn. While the maximum range of her ability is unknown, it is potentially limitless. Additionally, her clothes and appearance change to reflect attributes of the person whose powers she took.

== In other media ==
- Lori Zechlin makes a non-speaking cameo appearance in the Teen Titans episode "Things Change".
- Black Alice appears in DC Super Friends #19. This version is a student of Headmaster Mind's supervillain school who possesses the ability to duplicate magical powers instead of stealing them. Following a fight with the Super Friends, Alice defects to them, vowing to return to regular school and become a hero when she grows up.
