= Dwarfstar =

- Dwarfstar as depicted in The All-New Atom #3 (November 2006). Art by John Byrne (penciller), Trevor Scott (inker), and Alex Bleyaert (colorist).

Publication information
- Publisher: DC Comics
- First appearance: The All-New Atom #2 (October 2006)
- Created by: Gail Simone

In-story information
- Alter ego: Sylbert Rundine
- Species: Human
- Team affiliations: Secret Six; Titans
- Notable aliases: Anti-Atom
- Abilities: Size and mass alteration via belt; Knife proficiency

Dwarfstar (Sylbert Rundine) is a DC Comics supervillain introduced by Gail Simone in The All-New Atom #2. He was the archenemy of Ryan Choi.

Dwarfstar made his live-action debut in the fourth season of The Flash, portrayed by Derek Mears.

== Fictional character biography ==
Sylbert Rundine is a rapist and serial killer who preys on the dormitories of Ivy University. In his first appearance, he acquires a Bio-Belt similar to the one worn by college professor Ryan Choi and becomes the super-villain Dwarfstar.

He aged due to a forced stay in a time-accelerated micro-universe, leaving him even more mentally unhinged than before. He vanished along with Chronos and Lady Chronos. A master assassin as well as the shrinking nemesis of Atom, Dwarfstar is a constant thorn in Ryan's side during his tenure as Atom. The two men were actually connected in ways they were unaware of. A woman from Ryan's past was the reason that both men gained their shrinking belts, though Ryan was deceived to believe it was from Ray Palmer himself. The woman, Jia, who was a former flame of Ryan's, would later turn to a life of crime and become Lady Chronos.

Dwarfstar hired Deathstroke and his group of mercenaries, who called themselves Titans, to kill his nemesis Ryan Choi, a physics professor and costumed hero known as the Atom. Deathstroke along with Cheshire, Tattooed Man, Cinder, and Osiris carried out the sadistic mission. After a confrontation at Ryan's home, he is beaten and stabbed to death. Dwarfstar meets Deathstroke the next morning and is given Ryan's corpse. Shortly after Ryan's death, Dwarfstar joins Bane's gang, the Secret Six.

A short time later, Giganta invites Dwarfstar to her hotel room, where she attempts to seduce him. Giganta had been in a relationship with Ryan Choi; after learning that Dwarfstar had a hand in his death, Giganta proceeds to beat and torture him.

Ray Palmer discovers evidence that Dwarfstar had a hand in Ryan's death, and vows to find him and make him pay. Ray eventually finds Dwarfstar in a hospital, where he is recovering from the injuries he sustained from his torture at the hands of Giganta. Believing it may lead to a lighter sentence, Dwarfstar confesses to hiring Deathstroke to kill Ryan.

== Powers and abilities ==
Dwarfstar possesses the ability to alter his size down into subatomic levels while retaining his natural strength. This is accomplished by using these remnants of a white dwarf star made inside the Bio-Belt worn with his costume. Dwarfstar has 100% control over his body on the molecular scale, thus making him exponentially more powerful than he was often portrayed, but only limited by the application of his powers.

Dwarfstar is also an amateur poet and keenly skilled with the use of a hunting knife that he uses to torture or kill his victims.

== In other media ==
- Dwarfstar makes a cameo appearance in the Batman: Brave and the Bold episode "Sword of the Atom!".
- Dwarfstar appears in the fourth season of The Flash, portrayed by Derek Mears. This version is a thief who acquired the power to miniaturize objects from exposure to dark matter. In the episode "Honey, I Shrunk Team Flash", Dwarfstar uses his powers to miniaturize valuable items so he can easily steal and transport them until he is defeated by Team Flash and remanded to Iron Heights Penitentiary. In the episode "True Colors", Dwarfstar and his fellow metahuman inmates attempt to escape after learning the warden intends to sell them to Amunet Black before the Thinker intercepts them and steals their powers, killing them in the process.
