= List of DC Comics characters: N =

== Jay Nakamura ==
Jay Nakamura is a love interest of Jon Kent. He first appears in Superman: Son of Kal-El issue 2. He first appears at Jon Kent's attempted first day of college and later seeks out Jon as Superman for help. He reveals that be is a refugee from Gamorra, and is the son of Sara Nakamura, the former president of Gamorra. He shares that due to being the child of the former president, he was targeted by the new one, Henry Bendix. He was kidnapped and experimented on, leading to him gaining the metahuman ability of intangibility. Jay operates as the superhero Gossamer and the leader of the Truth, a news network aiming to expose Henry Bendix's actions.

In the series Suicide Squad: Dream Team, Jay's mother is killed, in part due to the actions of Nia Nal, who operates as the hero Dreamer and was previously friends with Jay, acting on behalf of Amanda Waller.

Jay Nakamura and Jon Kent star alongside Nia Nal, Black Alice, Catman, and Deadshot in the 2025 miniseries Secret Six, part of the DC All In relaunch, where they join the eponymous team. In the series, Jay discovers that the United States was responsible for the murder of his mother and the subsequent hostile takeover of Gamorra. The United States is also revealed to have known of Henry Bendix's experimentations, and implied to have assisted in his rise to power. Jay clashes with Jon over his desire to avenge his devastated home country, leading to the two breaking up.

== Nam-Ek ==
Nam-Ek is a Kryptonian who illegally killed two beasts called Rondors to develop an elixir for immortality. While it worked, Nam-Ek was transformed into a Rondor-like monster as a side effect.

After drifting in outer space after Kypton exploded, he was picked up by a space pirate named Amalak who had a disdain for Kryptonians. Arriving on Earth, he attempted to warn Superman of Amalak's plot. After thwarting Amalak's plague and using Nam-Ek's horn to cure the plague, Superman and Supergirl sentenced Nam-Ek to the Phantom Zone.

=== Nam-Ek in other media ===
- Nam-Ek appears in the Smallville episode "Arrival", portrayed by Leonard Roberts.
- Nam-Ek appears in Man of Steel, portrayed by Michael Justus.

== Nick Necro ==
- First appearance: Justice League Dark #12 (2012)
- Created by: Jeff Lemire & Mikel Janín
- Abilities: Skilled in black magic; Knowledge of the supernatural
- Aliases: Nick Necro

Nicholas Edgar Nolan, known as Nick Necro, is a mystical supervillain appearing in American comic books published by DC Comics. Created by Jeff Lemire and Mikel Janin, Necro first appeared in Justice League Dark #12, debuting during the New 52 era. The character is an accomplished sorcerer and former lover of John Constantine and Zatanna. However, his obsession with dark magic leads him to become a villain and adversary of Justice League Dark.

== Negative Flash ==
Negative Flash is the alias of two characters appearing in American comic books published by DC Comics. Both versions are speedsters corrupted by the Negative Speed Force, and were created by Joshua Williamson, Paul Pelletier, and Howard Porter.

=== Barry Allen ===
Barry Allen debuted as the first Negative Flash in The Flash (vol. 5) #26 (September 2017). After being forcibly infused with the Negative Speed Force while fighting Eobard Thawne, Allen's powers become increasingly destructive and his emotions increasingly volatile, straining his relationships and judgment.

=== Meena Dhawan ===
Meena Dhawan debuted as the second Negative Flash in The Flash (vol. 5) #34 (January 2018). She was revived by the Negative Speed Force storm and came under the thrall of Gorilla Grodd as an enforcer for Black Hole alongside Raijin.

=== Negative Flash in other media ===
- Four characters based on the Negative Flash appear in the Arrowverse series The Flash (2014).
  - Nora West-Allen / XS appears as an original incarnation in the fifth season, where she is corrupted by the Negative Speed Force.
  - Barry Allen appears as a variation renamed the Dark Flash in the sixth season two-part episode "The Last Temptation of Barry Allen", where he is corrupted by Ramsey Rosso / Bloodwork.
  - Meena Dhawan / Fast Track appears in the eighth season, where she is inadvertently connected to the Negative Speed Force, but is later saved.
  - Eobard Thawne appears as an original variation, the Negative Reverse-Flash, in the eighth season two-part finale "Negative" where he is enhanced by the Negative Forces.

== Neon the Unknown ==
Neon the Unknown is a superhero from the Golden Age of Comic Books created by Jerry Iger for Quality Comics. Neon first appeared in a story penciled and inked by Alex Blum in Hit Comics #1 and was featured on the cover of issue two drawn by Lou Fine. His stories ran in issues 1–17.

Tom Corbet is a member of the Foreign Legion. While pursuing an enemy across the desert, his entire unit save for him dies of thirst. Corbet comes across an oasis, with its water giving him the ability to fly and shoot energy from his hands.

According to Jess Nevins' Encyclopedia of Golden Age Superheroes, "he uses his power to kill an attacking tiger, stop a would-be world conqueror, and go on to fight crime and evil and the Germans, as well as Darmus the Wizard, the Tibetan Four Lamas, a "Batzi" scientist who drops "insanity spores" on the United States, and the scientist Fritz Cardiff and his invisibility ray". His only recurring foe was the Hitler-like dictator Herr Otto Shickler.

On December 7, 1941, Neon is recruited by Uncle Sam to join the Freedom Fighters in defending Pearl Harbor. He, Uncle Sam, Miss America, Hourman, Invisible Hood, Magno, and Red Torpedo are all seemingly killed, with Uncle Sam being the only survivor.

In the 2008 miniseries Uncle Sam and the Freedom Fighters, Neon is revealed to have survived. Called upon during a major crisis hitting the reformed Freedom Fighters, Tom Corbet is confronted by Langford Terrill, the former Ray. Now warped into a more powerful glowing form but more detached from humanity, Corbet allows Terrill to drink from the oasis, empowering him as the new Neon the Unknown.

In the DC Rebirth series The Unexpected, Neon the Unknown is reimagined as Colin Nomi, a bisexual artist and influencer who performed a ritual to evoke the Fires of Creation. The ritual filled Nomi's body with a rainbow substance that gave him the ability to transmute matter. The energy released during Nomi's transformation blinded him and killed his entourage, who had been in the room with him. Wracked with guilt, Nomi embarks on a journey of atonement and encounters two others on paths of redemption: Viking Judge, a female axe-wielding warrior; and the Ascendant, an ancient blue-skinned giant. The three, joined by Firebrand, decide to defend the multiverse together as the Unexpected.

== Nereus ==
King Nereus

Publication information
- Publisher: DC Comics
- First appearance: Aquman (vol. 7) #19 (2013)
- Created by: Geoff Johns & Paul Pelletier

In-story information
- Alter ego: Nereus of Xebel
- Species: Xebellian
- Place of origin: Xebel
- Team affiliations: Xebellian Royal Family
- Partnerships: Ocean Master
- Abilities: Xebellian physiology grants abilities including breathing underwater, superhuman strength, superhuman durability, enhanced senses, able to swim at extreme speed.; Skilled aquakinetic, politician, and fighter

King Nereus is a character who first appeared in Aquaman (vol. 7) #19 as part of The New 52 reboot and was created by Geoff Johns and Paul Pelletier. The character is depicted in the comics as Xebel's military chief and later ruler after the death of King Ryus, the father of Mera. He was also Mera's former fiancé before Aquaman.

In other media, Nereus is instead cast as Mera's father in several adaptations such as Young Justice and the DC Extended Universe films Aquaman and Aquaman and the Lost Kingdom, portrayed by Dolph Lundgren.

=== Fictional character biography ===
Nereus was initially a Xebel military chief to King Ryus and was to be betrothed to the king's daughter Mera. Before the wedding, Mera were tasked to kill the King of Atlantis as part of their kingdom's revenge for their imprisonment in the Bermuda Triangle by Atlantis centuries ago.

When King Ryus died and Mera fell in love with Aquaman, Nereus was sworn in as the new King of Xebel. Some years later, Mera returned to Xebel, where Nereus discovered that Mera did not kill Aquaman. When Nereus tried to kill Mera, the enemy in ice that pursued Mera appeared and froze all of Xebel. The frozen enemy introduced himself as Atlan the First King of Atlantis, who had awakened from his slumber and wanted his kingdoms back. Nereus swore his allegiance to the Dead King Atlan. When Aquaman arrived, he and Mera fled from Xebel when Nereus and his men pursued them. Nereus led his forces into invading Atlantis, where Mera was captured. Some months later, Atlan tasked Nereus with finding the other four Atlantean kingdoms.

=== Nereus in other media ===
- Nereus appears in films set in the DC Extended Universe (DCEU), portrayed by Dolph Lundgren. This version is Mera's father.
  - First appearing in Aquaman (2018), Orm Marius tricks Nereus into joining his campaign against the surface world while arranging for Mera to be betrothed to him. Mera convinces her father to abandon Orm after Aquaman obtains Atlan's trident and defeats Orm in combat.
  - In Aquaman and the Lost Kingdom, Nereus assists Mera and Aquaman in rescuing his grandson Arthur Jr. from Black Manta before accompanying Aquaman and King Brine to reveal Atlantis' existence at the United Nations.
- Nereus appears in Young Justice, voiced by David Kaye. This version is Ryus Nereus, the ruler of Xebel and a rival of Aquaman.
- Nereus appears in Lego DC Super-Villains as part of the "Aquaman" DLC.

== Neron ==
Neron is one of the major demon-lords of Hell. He specializes in making deals with people for their souls in exchange for fulfilling their greatest desires. These deals are Faustian arrangements made only to further his own ends, leading to either misfortune or death for the dealmakers. To approach a victim, he will either appear before them directly with a deal for their soul or send them a carved black candle, which, when lit, either summons him to them directly to make a deal or brings them to Hell. Neron was introduced in the 1995 storyline "Underworld Unleashed", where he offers his service to numerous supervillains and grants them increased powers in exchange for their souls.

=== Neron in other media ===
Neron appears in Legends of Tomorrow, portrayed by Christian Keyes in the body of Desmond and by Brandon Routh in the body of Ray Palmer.

== New Wave ==
New Wave (Rebecca Jones) is a metahuman criminal with the abilities to turn into water and control water in her surroundings. She led a group of mercenaries called the Masters of Disaster, using their metahuman abilities related to the elemental forces to create natural disasters. In addition, Rebecca is the sister of fellow Masters of Disaster member Windfall, who she pressured into joining. Wendy eventually stands up to Rebecca, leaving the Masters of Disaster for the Outsiders.

=== New Wave in other media ===
Becky Jones appears in the second season of Black Lightning, portrayed by Brooke Ence. This version was a prisoner who was chosen to become part of a metahuman attack squad via "Project Masters of Disaster" and placed in a stasis pod 30 years prior. In the present, Tobias Whale awakens her and the other Masters to build up a metahuman army.

== Carter Nichols ==
Professor Carter Nichols is a character appearing in media published by DC Comics. He first appeared in Batman #24 (August 1944), and was created by Joseph Samachson and Dick Sprang. Nichols was created to lend some sci-fi "color" to Batman stories to both Batman and World's Finest Comics, during a period where more conventional superhero tales were out of favor and most remaining books of the genre drifted into science fiction and related genres.

Carter Nichols is a childhood friend of Thomas Wayne. His appearances nearly always involved some form of time travel, based around his particular specialty referred to as "time travel hypnosis", a process that simulated time travel. Nichols also created a "Time-Ray Machine", which he used to both displace and track objects through time.

During the Batman: The Return of Bruce Wayne storyline, the Black Glove (led by Simon Hurt) attempt to convince Nichols to sacrifice Batman to Barbatos in exchange for funding for his time-travel experiments, but he refuses. In the present, Batman (Dick Grayson) and Robin investigate Nichols's lab and find him dead.

=== Carter Nichols in other media ===
Carter Nichols appears in the Batman: The Brave and the Bold episode "Last Bat on Earth!", voiced by Richard McGonagle.

== Nightmaster ==
The Nightmaster (Jim Rook) is a sword and sorcery hero published by DC Comics. He first appeared in Showcase #82 (May 1969), and was created by Dennis O'Neil and Jerry Grandenetti. Following his introduction in Showcase #82 (May 1969), the character appeared in the following two monthly issues, with Bernie Wrightson taking over the art.

Jim Rook, lead singer of the hard rock band The Electrics, enters a run-down shop named Oblivion Inc. Inside, he is transported to the dimension Myrra and learns that he is the descendant of the Myrran warrior Nacht. He takes his ancestor's Sword of Night, a weapon with the ability to warn of danger and force a person to speak the truth, and becomes involved in a clash between Myrra and evil warlocks.

After his adventures in Myrra, Rook opens a bookstore in the Oblivion Inc. space. While exploring a mysterious door in the bookstore, Rook discovers that it is one of many "back rooms" of the Oblivion Bar, an otherdimensional realm open to those touched by magic. After serving for a time as the bar's relief bartender, he becomes its owner.

== Nocturna ==
Nocturna
- "Nocturna" as depicted in Batwoman (vol. 2) #32 (August 2014). Art by Jeremy Haun (penciller) and Guy Major (inker).

Publication information
- Publisher: DC Comics
- First appearance: Detective Comics #529 (August 1983)
- Created by: Doug Moench; Don Newton; Gene Colan

In-story information
- Alter ego: Natalia Knight
- Abilities: Teleportation; Pheromone generation

Nocturna (/nɒkˈtɜːrnə/) is a supervillainess appearing in comic books published by DC Comics, created by Doug Moench and Gene Colan. The storyline involving her began in Detective Comics #529 (August 1983), and her first appearance was in Batman #363 (September 1983).

The pre-Crisis incarnation of Nocturna appeared in the first season of Batwoman, portrayed by Kayla Ewell.

=== Fictional character biography ===
==== Pre-Crisis ====
Natalia Knight is a homeless child who was adopted by Charles Knight. While working at the Gotham City Observatory, she is struck by a radioactive laser, giving her pale skin and sensitivity to light. After Charles Knight was murdered, she discovered that her lifestyle was funded by criminal activity. It was then that she met Charles' son, Anton Knight, who fell in love with her. They both decided to keep the inheritance and took it upon themselves to keep them in their accustomed lifestyle through burglary, since Natalia needed expensive medical equipment to treat her condition.

After several clashes with Batman, Anton was captured and sent to prison. Nocturna remained free and continued her life of crime along with a new ally, Nightshade. Nocturna would conceive the plans of robbery and theft, Nightshade and his people would carry out the crimes. Once the scheme had run its course, Nocturna called it quits. During this time, she became an intimate friend of Batman and Jason Todd.

==== Post-Crisis ====
Post-Crisis on Infinite Earths continuity introduced a new incarnation of Nocturna. This version is Natalie Metternich, a former astronomer who can secretes a pheromone that causes those around her to become emotional and lose their inhibitions. Metternich was an aspiring scientist, but retired after developing superpowers, which caused her to lose her own inhibitions and pursue other interests. Robin and Spoiler convince her to visit S.T.A.R. Labs to have her powers examined.

==== The New 52 ====
In September 2011, The New 52 rebooted DC's continuity. Nocturna is re-introduced as Natalie Mitternacht, an inmate of Arkham Asylum. Later in the Forever Evil storyline, Nocturna is among the villains recruited by the Crime Syndicate of America to join the Secret Society of Super Villains.

==== Infinite Frontier ====
In Infinite Frontier, an alternate universe version of Nocturna known as Natalia Metternich appears as a member of the Suicide Squad.

=== Nocturna in other media ===
==== Television ====
- Nocturna was considered to appear in Batman: The Animated Series and The New Batman Adventures, but was dropped after network censors objected to the idea of vampires.
- The Natalia Knight incarnation of Nocturna appears in the Batwoman episode "Drink Me", portrayed by Kayla Ewell. This version has a form of porphyria which makes her photosensitive. After her adoptive father Charles dies from a heart attack, Natalia is forced to obtain blood transfusions on her own, leading her to assume a vampiric persona and receive fang-like dental implants.
- A character based on the Natalia Knight incarnation of Nocturna named Natalia Night appears in the Batman: Caped Crusader episode "Nocturne", voiced by Mckenna Grace. She is a teenager and sister of inventor Anton Night who can drain energy from living organisms and grant herself enhanced strength.

==== Video games ====
The Natalia Knight incarnation of Nocturna appears as a character summon in Scribblenauts Unmasked: A DC Comics Adventure.

==== Miscellaneous ====
An unidentified incarnation of Nocturna appears in The Batman & Scooby-Doo Mysteries #12. This version's design borrows from Bruce Timm's unused concept for Batman: The Animated Series.

== Noose ==
Noose is a member of Moxie Mannheim's Intergang branch who committed suicide in prison in the 1940s before being revived in a clone body in the present day, gaining extendable, tentacle-like fingers. Noose is with Mannheim's gang when they and Dabney Donovan have Guardian captive.

In 52, Noose and Rough House visit Black Adam in Kahndaq on Intergang's behalf and give him Adrianna Tomaz as tribute. However, Black Adam kills them.

=== Noose in other media ===
Noose appears as a character summon in Scribblenauts Unmasked: A DC Comics Adventure.

== Nosferata ==
Nosferata is an evolved vampire bat and one of the many evolved animals created by Project Moreau, a precursor to Project Cadmus, who sought to overthrow the rulers of the Wild Lands like Great Caesar while coming into conflict with Superboy.

=== Nosferata in other media ===
- Nosferata appears in Catwoman: Hunted, voiced by Zehra Fazal. This version is a mercenary.
- Nosferata appears in Creature Commandos, voiced by Sydney Chandler. This version is a member of the eponymous team.

== Nuclear Man ==
Nuclear Man is a character appearing in American comic books published by DC Comics. He first appeared in Superman IV: The Quest for Peace before crossing over into the comics.

=== Superman IV: The Quest for Peace ===
Nuclear Man first appeared in Superman IV: The Quest for Peace, portrayed by Mark Pillow and voiced by Gene Hackman. He possesses similar abilities to Superman while also sporting retractable claws. This is because Nuclear Man was created by Lex Luthor and his nephew Lenny Luthor who stole a hair sample of Superman from a museum and had it and a special computer loaded onto a nuclear rocket that was shot towards the Sun. His only confirmed weakness is that he is inactive when there's no sunlight. Nuclear Man battles Superman three times and develops an obsession for Lacy Warfield. Forming a solar eclipse, Superman weakens Nuclear Man and drops him into a nuclear reactor.

=== Comics ===
In the comics continuity, Nuclear Man is an inmate of the Phantom Zone and a Kryptonian clone created by the House of El. After being transported to the Phantom Zone, Nuclear Man battles Rogol Zaar, an alien hunter who kills him.

== Nuklon ==
Nuklon is the name of two characters in DC Comics.

=== Gerome McKenna ===
Gerome McKenna is one of the first official subjects for Lex Luthor's "Everyman Project". Luthor's project grants super-powers to McKenna who is given the codename Nuklon after Luthor buys the rights to Infinity Inc. from Sylvester Pemberton's estate.

After Luthor disables his powers, McKenna enters a deep state of depression and self-absorption. McKenna later develops the ability to create a fully functional, independently thinking duplicate of himself, seemingly without control. However this version is dark and amoral, wishing to replace the original. McKenna's dark double is later captured by DeSaad and conditioned to be a fighter in the Dark Side Club. The clone kills McKenna, gaining autonomy. However, DeSaad activates a machine that strips all but three of the remaining Everyman subjects of their powers, causing the clone to fade away.

== Number None ==
Number None is the abstract manifestation of bad luck, manifesting as anything or anyone getting in someone's way, but not a specific person or thing. It joined the Brotherhood of Dada per Mr. Nobody's request, manifesting in that moment as a door that Agent "!" walked into to signal its joining of the Brotherhood.
