= Replacement child =

Child conceived by parents to replace an older dead sibling

Replacement child is a term that refers to a child conceived shortly after the parents have lost another child. It was coined by the psychologists Albert C. Cain and Barbara S. Cain in 1964.

Since then, people have expanded the definition to include not only a child born shortly after another child dies but also any child born to replace a child who had died no matter the time frame. Another definition is that a replacement child may also be a child who essentially takes over the role of an older sibling who dies.

In a situation that a child is a replacement child, the parents have not usually moved forward from their other child's death, and they are often stuck in the process of grieving. The replacement child is meant to fill a void from which the parents have not healed. The parents are survivors of losing a child but often still experience a lot of trauma with which they are having trouble coping and results in having the replacement child.

That often results in the parents being emotionally unavailable to the new child, which results in some problems for that child. It can result in developmental disturbances, and even the child may have trouble growing their own identity because they feel like they are living in the shadow of someone else. Parents can lose a child and have another child after without it being considered a replacement child because they have mourned and accepted the loss of their previous child and so the new child is not “replacing” them.

Many replacement children might not often know that they are a replacement child, since the idea is not mainstream. Often, the child has issues that cause a struggle but cannot place a reason behind it. When they can become more aware of the situation, they are more likely to be able to work through the issues and reframe the situation.

In 1980, the clinicians Robert Krell and Leslie Rabkin identified three types of replacement child: the "haunted" child, who lives in a family overwhelmed by guilt and silence; the "bound" child, who is incomparably precious and sometimes over-protected; and the "resurrected" child, who is treated as a reincarnation of the dead sibling. The artists Vincent van Gogh and Salvador Dalí, who had brothers of the same name who died before their birth, are examples of resurrected children.

Another example of a replacement child is James Barrie, the author of Peter Pan, and was the type of replacement child that took over the role of an older sibling who died. He was 6 years old when his older brother died at the age of 14. After the loss of her older child, their mother became depressed and so James began to dress up in his older brother's clothes and even learned to whistle like his older brother to gain the attention of his mother.
