= George Lawton (antiquary) =

English antiquarian

- Born: 6 May 1779; York
- Died: 2 December 1869 (aged 90); Nunthorpe
- Occupation: Antiquarian

George Lawton (6 May 1779 – 2 December 1869) was an English antiquarian.

== Biography ==
Lawton was born at York on 6 May 1779. He was educated in his native city, was articled to a proctor there, and was admitted a proctor on 3 November 1808. He was also a solicitor, notary-public, and was appointed registrar of the archdeaconry of the East Riding of Yorkshire by Archdeacon Wilberforce. He served in the ecclesiastical courts under five archbishops of York. He ceased practice as a solicitor in 1863, and died a widower at his residence, Nunthorpe, on 2 December 1869, leaving issue. Lawton wrote:

1. 'The Marriage Act' (4 Geo. IV, c. 76), London, 1823, 8vo.
2. 'A Brief Treatise of Bona Notabilia,' London, 1826, 8vo.
3. 'Collectio Rerum Ecclesiasticarum,' London, 2 vols. 1840, 8vo; 2nd edit. 1842.
4. 'The Religious Houses of Yorkshire.' York, 1863, 8vo.

Lawton's books were suggested by his work as a proctor; the 'Collectio Rerum Ecclesiasticarum' is still an authority.
