= Cheshire (character) =

DC Comics character

- Cheshire from DC Festival of Heroes: The Asian Superhero Celebration #1. Art by Jen Bartel.

Publication information
- Publisher: DC Comics
- First appearance: New Teen Titans Annual #2 (September 1983)
- Created by: Marv Wolfman (writer); George Pérez (artist)

In-story information
- Alter ego: Jade Nguyen
- Species: Human
- Team affiliations: Injustice League; Secret Six; Suicide Squad; Underground Society; Tartarus; The Ravens; Titans; League of Assassins
- Partnerships: Lady Shiva; Bronze Tiger; Roy Harper; Catman; Cheetah (Barbara Minerva)
- Abilities: Master martial artist, swordswoman, and acrobat; Expert toxicologist; Weapon proficiency; Expert in espionage, stealth, deception, and seduction; Toxic immunity

Cheshire (Jade Nguyen) is a supervillain appearing in American comic books published by DC Comics. Created by Marv Wolfman and George Pérez, the character made her debut in New Teen Titans Annual #2 (September 1983). A master assassin with an affinity for poison and a reputation as a feared and efficient character, she is considered one of the deadliest assassins and premier martial artists on Earth.

A woman of Viet origin with differing origin stories and background in her publication history, she becomes an infamous assassin known for her affinity for poison and has ties with the League of Assassins, the Secret Society of Super Villains, and other villainous and criminal groups as she battle heroes. A frequent adversary of the Teen Titans and its subsequent iterations, she is the occasional love interest of Roy Harper. The two have a daughter, Lian Harper (later known as Cheshire Cat).

The character has been adapted into several media; her first animated appearance was a non-speaking role in Teen Titans. Cheshire appears in Young Justice, voiced by Kelly Hu. Unlike her comics' version, the character is made the daughter of Sportsmaster and Huntress (Paula Brooks), the latter renamed Paula Nguyen and made Vietnamese, and is the older sister of Artemis Crock.

== Publication history ==
Cheshire first appeared in New Teen Titans Annual #2 (1983) and was created by Marv Wolfman and George Pérez.

== Fictional character biography ==
=== Origin ===
Cheshire has been presented with several origins; her earliest origin makes her born to a French father (Andrê Chaumont) and Vietnamese mother who was abandoned by the age of 10 and sold into slavery. As a teenager, she is adopted by Chinese freedom fighter and World War II veteran Weng Chan (whom once served in the Blackhawks) and mentors her. She also later meets Kruen Musenda, a famed African assassin known as the "Spitting Cobra", whom she marries at age sixteen and acquires knowledge of poisons and toxicology two years before his death. Back at Weng's side for a time, she becomes the villain and infamous assassin, Cheshire. Aspects of her origin is altered, retroactively making her the biological daughter of American United States Senator Robert Pullman, who had previously raped her mother and was raised in secret.

=== Villainous career ===
She is a long-standing rival of the superhero team the Teen Titans. However, when Roy Harper goes undercover for the government in a mission to get her confidence and turn her over, the two fall passionately in love. Knowing he will not be able to turn her in, he walks out; Cheshire does not learn his true identity until later. The result of their romance is a daughter, Lian, whom Roy raises.

Returning to her mercenary ways after leaving Lian behind for Roy, Jade saves Deathstroke's life so he can help her in stealing nuclear weapons from Russia in an attempt to blackmail the world. To prove she is not bluffing, she obliterates Qurac, reasoning that since Qurac is a stronghold of Onslaught terrorists, that Western countries will be secretly grateful. Cheshire's plans are foiled when her base comes under attack and she is forced to flee. She later creates her own team, The Ravens.

Cheshire volunteers to join Tartarus, a group created by Vandal Savage with the objective of destroying the Titans. During a confrontation with the Titans and H.I.V.E, Savage shoots Cheshire to distract Arsenal. She recovers, but is taken into custody for crimes including destroying Qurac. Sentenced to life imprisonment, she is broken out by the Ravens. Arsenal, however, forces her back into custody.

Eventually, Cheshire discovers that her biological father is a Senator named Robert Pullman, and she attempts to torture and kill him. To that end, she defeats Lady Shiva, and devises a plan to use her to fake her own death and flee the country with her daughter. Jade ties up Shiva, gags her and locks her in the trunk of her car (which is wired to explode), hoping that the authorities will find the charred body of an Asian woman in the flaming car wreck and believe that Jade was killed while fleeing the Senator's murder. Catwoman and Gypsy show up and untie Shiva, while Huntress and Black Canary stop Jade from murdering the Senator, and take her into custody. While escaping the scene of the attempted assassination, Jade is punched in the face and thrown out of the helicopter the women were escaping in by Black Canary to avoid being beaten to death by an enraged Shiva.

In 2005, she appears in the miniseries Villains United as a member of the Secret Six. Cheshire is blackmailed into joining by Mockingbird, who claims that there is a small bomb implanted in the back of Lian's head. During the series, she sleeps with Catman, and becomes pregnant with a replacement child, thereby allowing her to leave the team and no longer needing to worry for Lian's safety. At the end of the miniseries, having betrayed the Six to Luthor's Society, she is shot and critically wounded by Deathstroke. As the faux Luthor orders the Society's withdrawal, one of his last commands is to bring Cheshire with them, provided she is still alive.

After the "Villains United" series, she turns up alive, living in a mansion in the Himalayas with her son by Blake. Working with Vandal Savage again, she puts out hits on the other members of the Secret Six except for Blake. Taking matters into her own hands, she stabs and poisons the Mad Hatter, who is working with the Six. She later barters the antidote to the poison to Catman in exchange for her safety.

In the Justice League of America Wedding Special, Cheshire is shown to be a member of the Injustice League. She is later seen among the exiled villains in Salvation Run.

In Justice League: Cry for Justice, Prometheus destroys Star City, killing Lian. Cheshire attacks Roy, outraged at him for not keeping Lian safe, injuring him in the process. However, Cheshire loses the will to fight and tearfully recalls the loss of her child. Roy comforts her and the two of them attempt to sleep together, but due to Roy's impotence he is unable to please Cheshire in bed, which causes more turmoil in Roy's life forcing him to angrily leave.

In Secret Six, Cheshire's son from her involvement with Catman is kidnapped. Catman goes on a murderous rampage believing the child to already be dead only to find the man who orchestrated the kidnapping has given the boy to a loving childless couple and that the kidnapping itself was an act of revenge against Cheshire for murdering his family. Catman, after realizing the child is better left where he is, informs Cheshire that their son is dead. This sends her into a sorrowful rage, while Catman tells his son to rest in peace after killing all of the kidnappers involved.

Cheshire becomes a member of Deathstroke's team of Titans. Their first assignment is murdering Ryan Choi. One of Deathstroke's goals is to taunt her into overcoming her lost edge after Lian's death. She later contacts Roy, forcing him into joining Deathstroke's team so the two of them can kill Deathstroke. Cheshire rationalizes that Roy "owes" her for Lian's death, but while it appears Roy double-crosses her, it is part of Cheshire's plan. Afterward, Deathstroke and his team arrive at South Pacific Island to kill cult leader, Drago, over the arena production of blind warriors; however, his team, Cheshire, and Roy betray him, revealing that they had been working with Drago. Cheshire and Roy's plan backfires, because Drago never intended to give Cheshire her freedom back. Their attempt to defeat Drago and escape fails miserably. Later, Drago explains to Cheshire that he needs an heir, and she is going to provide him with one. Drago tries to convince Cheshire to succumb to him, reading her mind and using her thoughts against her. Cheshire is rescued by Deathstroke and the Titans. When Drago is defeated, Deathstroke allows him to live and the Titans leave his island. Cheshire and Roy choose to re-join the Titans. Upon returning to the labyrinth, Deathstroke reveals to them that his preceding deeds are being used to create a healing machine called a "Methuselah Device" for his dying son, Jericho. After healing Jericho, Deathstroke claims the machine can also resurrect the dead, offering Cheshire and Roy the chance to revive Lian. Cheshire accepts, but Roy refuses, saying that he has been punishing himself for his daughter's death and that Lian is in a better place. Cheshire joins Tattooed Man and Cinder in fighting the other Titans to destroy the Methuselah Device. After Cinder sacrifices herself to destroy the Methuselah, Cheshire leaves and tells Roy that she will never forgive him.

=== New 52 onward ===
In this new mainstream continuity, Cheshire's backstory and early life and is initially considered shrouded in mystery. This revised continuity also identifies her as simply Vietnamese, her background no longer tying to Pullman or Chaumont thus far.

In The New 52, Cheshire first appears in Grifter, becoming a team with Deathblow to aid Cole Cash. In this timeline, the character is originally only referred to as Niko, not as Cheshire. Later, she betrays Grifter and Deathblow revealing she was an undercover agent for Helspont, but later was defeated by them when they tried to stop Helspont's plans. Cheshire is later seen as a member of the League of Assassins when they plan to recruit Red Hood. Cheshire appears in Aquaman and the Others, teaming up with KGBeast and a group of terrorists known as Mayhem to steal the launch codes to a Soviet-era satellite full of nuclear weapons to hold the Earth to ransom.

=== DC Rebirth ===
In Rebirth, Cheshire appears as one of the bounty hunters trying to kill Wonder Woman. Cheshire is also one of the assassins hired by the Ninth Circle to eliminate Green Arrow. She later attempts to kill Batman. She is stated to be one of the most toxic individuals on the planet, along with Copperhead. They attack Batman on a train, and he responds by blowing himself up into a lake below. Cheshire and Copperhead comment on his resilience.

Arsenal is shown tracking Cheshire down in Nightwing #43. It is stated that they used to date but parted ways due to Jade's villainous tendencies. Cheshire is seen leading a mission for the League of Assassins with the intent of carrying out a citywide catastrophe, but her plans are thwarted by Nightwing, Damian Wayne, and Roy.

Cheshire was hired by the Brotherhood of Evil to steal a sample of drug material called Bliss. In the same time, Roy Harper is on the trail for the drug as well. Cheshire plays him into helping her, poisoning him during a sexual encounter leading him to believe he had relapsed on drugs. Soon after, still under the employ of the Brotherhood, she, along with a few thugs, defends Monsieur Mallah and the Brain by fighting off Arsenal. Devastatingly mismatched, Arsenal is nearly beaten to death by the thugs while Cheshire steps back and watches. She spares him the misfortune of being beaten to death and provides him with euthanasia. As she is about to do so, Donna Troy arrives to stop her. Nearly losing to her, Cheshire attempts to taunt Donna into killing her as she was told of recent events that were highly sensitive to Donna. As she decides what to do next with Cheshire, Arsenal defeats her with a trick arrow.

Cheshire secretly attends Roy Harper's funeral, standing away far from everyone else, in the back. She looks inexpressive, yet sheds a single tear, possibly feeling remorse their about last interaction. She re-appears in Green Arrow comics as a member of the Ninth Circle.

Cheshire later appeared in James Tynion's first arc on Batman. She is one of the assassins, along with Deathstroke, Merlyn, Gunsmith and Mr. Teeth, hired by Penguin and the Designer to kill Batman. She evaded capture from the GCPD and almost tries to kill Batman, but was hit by a truck, while Batman slid from underneath the truck. Batman brings her in to custody, until the other assassins helped her escape. Cheshire, along with Merlyn, would later attempt to attack Catwoman and Harley Quinn at a cemetery, but were both defeated by them.

=== Infinite Frontier ===
Cheshire reappears in the Infinite Frontier event, now sporting a mask similar to her Young Justice counterpart. In a flashback, Jade is shown fleeing from ninjas with her daughter, Lian. To protect her, Jade took Lian to a local church in Gotham City, referring to the then-sleeping girl as Lotus before departing back into the night.

Moreover, Jade is reinstated that her heritage as only Vietnamese, therefore she is no longer stated to be the daughter of Senator Pullman, or André Chaumont and Anna Nguyen.

Throughout Catwoman #33-38, Jade is shown pursuing a redemption path alongside Clayface, and other villains such as Firefly and Knockout. Together, they aided Catwoman to save Alleytown from the Magistrate. In Catwoman #38, Jade is reunited with her now teenage daughter Lian.

=== Dawn of DC ===
In the Detective Comics arc "Batman: Outlaw", Jade is shown living in Gotham. She is confronted by her daughter, Lian, who seeks answers as to why Jade had abandoned her. Jade reveals that she feared motherhood had made her weak, preventing her from continuing her mercenary life, to which Lian argues that this mindset is due to Jade being abandoned by her family when she was a child and being taught to kill and destroy from an early age. Therefore, Lian points out that Jade pushes people away because she thinks she doesn't deserve them. After this confrontation, Lian asks Jade to join her and Catwoman's cause to save Batman from the Orghams, a family who seeks to publicly execute him. Jade agrees to help her and reconciles with her daughter, hugging her. Jade and Lian were responsible for rescuing the citizens who were locked away in the tunnels underneath Gotham. In the tunnels Jade and Lian fought several soldiers hired by the Orghams and Jade stated to Lian that she would never abandon her again. Once Batman's body had been recovered by Catwoman, Jade helped carry the body to the docks of Gotham City and out of the hands of the Orghams.

In Joshua Williamson's Green Arrow run, Roy Harper seeks Jade to help him find Lian, who had been time-displaced by Amanda Waller alongside Green Arrow and Connor Hawke. Jade agrees to help him and Black Canary save Lian, Connor, and Green Arrow. Upon finding Waller's underwater safehouse, both Jade and Roy were gunned down and possibly killed by Waller. Jade survived but Waller imprisoned her and held her hostage to force Roy to work for her. Oliver Queen eventually secretly cut a deal to work for Waller, which appeared to include her agreeing to release Roy and leave the rest of Team Arrow alone. Roy and Lian broke into the secret prison where Cheshire was being held and freed her, returning to Arrow island.

During the Absolute Power storyline, Jade goes into hiding with Green Arrow after Waller unleashes an army of Amazos to drain the powers of all metahumans. Cheshire attempts to get in contact with Professor Ivo, the original creator of Amazo, as he may know of a weakness that the new Amazos had. By the time they catch up to Ivo, he has been captured by Bright, one of Waller's agents.

== Characterization ==
Portrayed as a infamous assassin, the character is often cited as among the deadliest assassins in the world; at times, she is referred to as being second behind Lady Shiva with toxicology expertise comparable to fellow villain Poison Ivy. As a villain, she is characterized to be a terrorist, mercenary, and assassin whose true loyalty is to herself, making her untrustworthy to even her closest friends and teammates. However, she is also characterized with a softer side and conscience at times, drawn to love interests Roy Harper and Catman; the former relationship resulted in Lian Harper and their mother-daughter relationship is a reoccurring theme. Prior to the New 52's revisions and erasure, her relationship with Catman resulted in a son (Thomas Blake Jr.).

== Skills and abilities ==
Described as a superior hand-to-hand combatant, master martial artist with knowledge of ancient forgotten techniques, and a triple-jointed acrobat, Cheshire also has an affinity for poisons; an expert on toxicology, she often dips her weapons, her razor-sharp artificial fingernails to deliver them with a scratch. She is also a master of various weaponry, also combining them with her poisons, and could use a teleportation device .

== Other versions ==
- An alternate timeline version of Cheshire appears in Flashpoint as a member of the Amazons' Furies.
- An alternate universe version of Cheshire makes a minor appearance in DC vs. Vampires #2.

== In other media ==
=== Television ===
Cheshire as she appears in Teen Titans.

Cheshire as she appears in Young Justice.

- Cheshire makes non-speaking appearances in the fifth season of Teen Titans. This version is a member of the Brotherhood of Evil with the ability to turn invisible save for her mask's eyes and grin, akin to the Cheshire Cat.
- The Teen Titans incarnation of Cheshire appears in the "New Teen Titans" segment of DC Nation Shorts.
- Cheshire appears in Young Justice, voiced by Kelly Hu. This version is a member of the League of Shadows who wields a pair of sai and a technologically advanced, multi-purpose mask. Additionally, she is the daughter of Sportsmaster and Paula Nguyen and older sister of Artemis Crock. In between the first and second seasons, Cheshire betrayed the Shadows to save Red Arrow, whom she married, and gave birth to a baby girl named Lian Nguyen-Harper. In between the second and third seasons however, Cheshire left Lian in Artemis and Red Arrow's care to focus on her criminal activities as she feels unworthy to be Lian's mother and part of a normal family despite still loving Lian and Red Arrow. In the fourth season, Cheshire reveals to Artemis that she fears being a bad influence on Lian. Upon hearing of her plight, Ra's al Ghul agrees to help rehabilitate Cheshire, who stays on Infinity Island to work on herself.

=== Film ===
- Jade appears in Batman: Soul of the Dragon, voiced by Jamie Chung. This version is a student of O-Sensei who frequently challenges her master's decisions. She is later murdered by fellow student Rip Jagger to open a mystical gate to the realm of the serpent god Nāga.
- Cheshire appears in Catwoman: Hunted, voiced again by Kelly Hu. This version is a member of the League of Shadows and an associate of Barbara Minerva.

=== Video games ===
- The Young Justice incarnation of Cheshire appears as a boss in Young Justice: Legacy, voiced again by Kelly Hu.
- Cheshire appears as a character in Scribblenauts Unmasked: A DC Comics Adventure.
- Cheshire appears as a playable character summon in Lego Batman 3: Beyond Gotham, voiced by Tara Strong.
- Cheshire appears as a playable character in Lego DC Super-Villains.
- Cheshire appears as a playable character in DC Heroes and Villains.
- Cheshire appears as a playable character in DC Legends.

=== Miscellaneous ===
- The Teen Titans animated series incarnation of Cheshire appears in Teen Titans Go!.
- Cheshire makes a minor appearance in the Injustice: Gods Among Us prequel comic.
- Cheshire appears in DC Super Hero Girls, voiced by Nika Futterman.
