= Deadshot =

Supervillain appearing in DC Comics

- Deadshot as depicted on a splashpage of Next Level: One Shot #1 (August 2026). Art by Fernando Blanco.

Publication information
- Publisher: DC Comics
- First appearance: Batman #59 (June 1950)
- Created by: David Vern Reed (writer); Lew Sayre Schwartz (artist); Bob Kane (concept)

In-story information
- Alter ego: Floyd Lawton
- Team affiliations: Suicide Squad; Secret Six; Secret Society of Super Villains; Checkmate; Killer Elite
- Abilities: Master marksman; Skilled hand-to-hand combatant; Utilizes battlesuit equipped with wrist-mounted guns and a high-tech targeting sight

Deadshot is a supervillain appearing in American comic books published by DC Comics. Created by writer David Vern Reed and artist Lew Sayre Schwartz based on a concept from Bob Kane, the character first appeared in Batman #59 (1950). Introduced as a gun-toting criminal in a tuxedo, top hat, and domino mask, Deadshot was only intended to be a one-off villain for the superhero Batman, but writer Steve Englehart and artist Marshall Rogers revived, redesigned, and popularized the character in Detective Comics #474 (1977), which featured the debut of his wrist-mounted guns, reticle emblem, and mask with a built-in targeting sight that have since become Deadshot's visual motif. This revamped depiction of the character has endured as one of Batman's most recurring enemies belonging to the collective of adversaries that make up his rogues gallery.

Deadshot is the alias of Floyd Lawton, a mercenary with a death wish who possesses uncanny, near-superhuman accuracy and regularly boasts of never missing a shot. Regarded as the greatest marksman and one of the deadliest assassins in the DC Universe, Deadshot has come into conflict with various heroes, including Batman, Green Arrow, and the Justice League. The character has also been depicted as an antihero as a core member of the Suicide Squad, a task force of supervillains coerced by the U.S. government into executing black ops missions and neutralizing more dangerous threats in exchange for reduced prison sentences and, in Deadshot's case, support for his estranged daughter Zoe.

The character has been adapted in various media incarnations, having been portrayed in television by Bradley Stryker in Smallville and Michael Rowe in Arrow, and in film by Will Smith in Suicide Squad. Michael Rosenbaum, Jim Meskimen, and Christian Slater, among others, have provided Deadshot's voice in animation.

== Publication history ==
Deadshot was created by writer David Vern Reed and artist Lew Sayre Schwartz, based on a concept from Batman creator Bob Kane, and first appeared in Batman #59 (1950). The character was introduced as a wealthy crime lord posing as a gun-toting vigilante in a tuxedo, top hat, and domino mask. This debut marked Deadshot's only appearance in the Golden Age of Comic Books, as he was intended to be a one-off villain for Batman.

Deadshot was revived 27 years later by writer Steve Englehart and artist Marshall Rogers in Detective Comics #474 (1977). The character's design was completely changed, and his new costume included wrist-mounted guns, an emblem of a reticle on his chest, and a mask with a targeting sight over his right eye. The core aspects of this redesign would remain throughout the Bronze and Modern Age of Comic Books, as Deadshot was recharacterized as an assassin-for-hire and member of Batman's central rogues gallery in his subsequent appearances.

The character gained further prominence after being featured in writer John Ostrander's version of the Suicide Squad, which debuted in Legends #3 (1987). Deadshot became one of the squad's best-known and longest-serving members, and has appeared in almost all of its media adaptations.

Due to his popularity, Deadshot received his own self-titled limited series that ran from 1988 to 1989. Written by Ostrander and Kim Yale and illustrated by Luke McDonnell, it expanded on Deadshot's past and established his "death wish"—a self-destructive desire to die in a spectacular fashion—suggesting why he decorated his second costume with a crosshair on his chest. Deadshot received a second self-titled limited series in 2005, written by Christos N. Gage and illustrated by Steven Cummings, which introduced his daughter Zoe.

== Fictional character biography ==
=== Origin ===
Deadshot in his debut in Batman #59 (June 1950). Art by Lew Sayre Schwartz, Bob Kane, and Charles Paris.

In his debut appearance, Floyd Lawton is introduced as an independently wealthy man with a trusted staff member and valet named Stevens. Gotham's wealthier citizens, including Batman's alter ego Bruce Wayne, refer to Lawton as someone "new" to Gotham City.

Following his recruitment to Task Force X (the "Suicide Squad"), Lawton's past is further explained by therapist Dr. Marnie Herrs. As a child, Floyd Lawton and his older brother are raised in a wealthy family that has great influence over their community. Their father George owns interests in much of the local real estate and hold sway over the local police, while their mother Genevieve, a prize-winning sharp shooter, controls the Pitt banking businesses. The Lawton parents are seen as a power couple in their society circles, but in private they grow to hate each other. By various accounts, Floyd is repeatedly judged by his parents for not matching the achievements of his brother in academics and sports, leading the younger Lawton child to act out in various ways.

When Eddie is in his mid-teens and Floyd is around 12 years old, Genevieve tells her sons about her husband's infidelities and the many abuses she suffers under him, then asks the boys to kill George. Floyd attempts to warn George, but Eddie locks his younger brother in the nearby boathouse and then locks the doors of the family home so no one can enter or intrude on the killing. Floyd escapes, grabs a hunting rifle, and climbs a nearby tree to get a better view through all the windows of the family home. Seeing Eddie enter the house library to shoot their father, Floyd fires his rifle, hoping to disarm his brother. But the tree branch Floyd is on suddenly gives way and throws off his aim, causing him to shoot Eddie just as the elder brother shoots at their father. Eddie's aim is also thrown off, leading his bullet to shatter George's spine.

Refusing to have his family name tarnished by the scandal that would occur, George arranges with the police to cover up details of the crime. The official report concludes that an unknown sniper opened fire twice on George and that his son Eddie heroically died while diving into the path of the second bullet. As punishment for her efforts, George refuses to divorce Genevieve and instead forces her to live on a limited allowance and in isolation in another, smaller house the Lawtons own on the outskirts of town. After high school, Floyd Lawton left his family home to travel. Despite his later claims that he felt nothing on seeing his brother die, he often shows anger when recalling the incident and Eddie's death inspires him to swear that in the future when he fires a gun, he will "never miss."

The next several years of Floyd Lawton's life before his arrival in Gotham City are not fully explained in the comics, though it is eventually revealed that as a young man he did meet David Cain, a highly skilled assassin who years earlier had been one of the teachers of Batman during the hero's many years of preparation for crime-fighting. As a member of the League of Assassins, who sometimes take private contracts but are also available as operatives of the terrorist Ra's al Ghul, Cain is an expert in marksmanship, hand-to-hand combat techniques, martial arts, and military tactics, and he trains Floyd Lawton in all these areas. Floyd later remarks that Cain was his "best teacher".

Lawton becomes a hired assassin in Europe and South America, staying largely unknown to authorities but gaining a reputation among certain gangs and cartels as a killer who never misses. At some point, Floyd Lawton marries a woman named Susan and they have a child together, a boy named after Floyd's deceased brother. Floyd later divorces Susan and removes himself from her and Edward's life. He later claims he did this because Susan saw him not as who he is but who she thought he could be, and that his presence endangered the lives of happiness of her and Edward.

=== Golden Age ===
Eventually, Floyd takes residence in Gotham City and hires an assistant and trusted valet named Steven. He decides to become an influential figure and crime lord, similar to how his parents operated in his home town. While attending a charity ball, Floyd witnesses Gotham City's hero Batman apprehend a group of thieves. Seeing Batman as a rival, Floyd decides to reduce the hero's influence on Gotham before fully embarking on a criminal career. Donning a tuxedo, top hat, gun belt, and domino mask, Lawton operates publicly in Gotham City as a vigilante called Deadshot and uses his marksmanship abilities to disarm criminals without killing them.

Batman becomes suspicious of Deadshot and eventually learns his true motives and identity. Later, Deadshot reveals himself and attempts to kill Batman but is shocked when each of his shots miss. Batman taunts that Deadshot has no nerve to properly face and kill an opponent. In truth, Batman had gotten to Deadshot's weapons ahead of time and altered their sights to throw off his aim, hoping to shake the villain psychologically. Publicly exposed, Deadshot is taken to trial and imprisoned.

=== Bronze Age ===
After some time, he becomes resentful that he is considered a forgotten enemy of Batman's while others such as the Penguin and Riddler gain greater renown. At his first opportunity, he escapes imprisonment and decides to prove himself in combat against Batman with new, wrist-mounted guns, customized body armor, and a mask that helps his already impressive aim. Despite his efforts, Deadshot is once again defeated by Gotham City's hero. After escaping authorities again, Deadshot once again becomes an assassin for hire rather than focusing on revenge against the Dark Knight.

=== Modern Age ===
Government operative Amanda Waller gets permission to revive Task Force X, a special operations group that in the past was also known as the Suicide Squad. Under Waller's leadership, Task Force X is no longer a group of government and military operatives but now is primarily made up of incarcerated super-villains who are considered expendable if lost on dangerous missions and are promised reduced prison time in exchange for their services.

After being defeated by the Flash, Floyd Lawton is imprisoned again and transferred to Belle Reve, a prison in Louisiana that also serves as the secret hub for the new Suicide Squad. There, Deadshot is recruited by Amanda Waller. It is later said Deadshot is selected not only due to his skills but also because mandated therapy sessions have revealed he sometimes is prone to a "death wish", internally hoping a proper enemy will end his life in a dramatic battle (it is also suggested this is why he initially decorates his second costume with a target on his chest). During his time with the team, Deadshot frequently clashes with teammate Captain Boomerang and field leader Rick Flag (for whom Floyd develops a grudging respect).

Soon after Deadshot joins the Suicide Squad, Batman learns of the team's existence and confronts them, threatening to expose that the US government is employing super-villains for covert and possibly illegal missions. Amanda Waller counters that public exposure of Task Force X will force her to reveal Batman's true identity. Before Batman leaves, Deadshot threatens him but the Dark Knight remarks that Lawton always "pulls" his shots when they are in battle with each other. Therapist Dr. Marnie Herrs later agrees with this conclusion, remarking that Deadshot sometimes sabotages his own efforts as if inviting his opponents to kill him.

Deadshot's son Edward, now about eight years old, is kidnapped by a gang of criminals hoping to manipulate Floyd. One of the gang members, Wes Anselm, is a pedophile with documented incidents of assaults against children. When Deadshot hunts down the gang, Wes grabs young Eddie and knocks him out, then flees with the boy in a car. Later, Deadshot finds Wes in his apartment and Eddie lying dead. Wes implies the boy struggled against an assault, which resulted in Wes becoming enraged and killing him. Deadshot takes revenge by delivering several non-lethal gunshots to Wes before finally killing him.

Having learned that Eddie's kidnapping was part of a complicated plot by Genevieve Lawton to inspire Floyd to finally kill his father, Deadshot returns to his home town. Confronting his mother in her home, Deadshot first intends to kill her but then reconsiders when his therapist Marnie Herrs points out that Genevieve also has her own desire for death and hopes to be killed as she does not wish to harm herself. Rather than possibly give her the outcome she desires, Deadshot chooses not to kill his mother and instead shoots her with a precision shot to the spine, causing her to be a paraplegic. Deadshot remarks that this is fitting since her efforts to kill George Lawton only resulted in his own paralysis, and now they are a "matched set."

Later on, a US senator threatens to expose the Suicide Squad to the world. Task Force X field leader Rick Flag decides to assassinate the senator and Deadshot is ordered to stop Flag. On the steps of the Lincoln Memorial, Deadshot publicly kills the senator himself, justifying that this is in compliance with his literal orders to stop Flag from killing the senator. DC police then gun down Deadshot where he stands, but he survives his wounds. After treatment, he returns to active duty with the Suicide Squad.

Eventually, the Suicide Squad operations are temporarily halted and Deadshot returns to his own life and agenda. At one point, he becomes a host body for the demon lord Neron and nearly kills a kindergarten class. To Lawton's relief, he is stopped and then relieved of his demonic possession by the Justice League. Later on, Deadshot accepts a contract to kill the Pope, but is thwarted by Wonder Woman.

After both of his parents die, Deadshot inherits some of their documents and belongings. He finds a letter from Michelle Torres, a woman who claims Floyd Lawton is the father of her daughter Zoe. Deadshot visits Michelle in the Triangle, a neighborhood of Star City. Realizing Zoe is indeed his daughter, he recognizes Michelle as a sex worker he spent time with years before. Haunted by the memory of abandoning his son Eddie and later finding him dead, Floyd decides to take up temporary residence in the Triangle and look after Zoe and Michelle. He learns more about Michelle as a person, such as that she is proud of her Cuban and Italian heritage, and he comes to understand the different criminal gangs and slum lords that threaten the Triangle. Announcing his presence, Deadshot begins systematically fighting corruption in the Triangle, hoping to make it a safer place for Zoe and Michelle. This results in the local population advocating to protect Deadshot from vigilantes such as local hero Green Arrow, and also leads to a new romance between Michelle and Floyd.

As supervillains with a grudge against Deadshot begin appearing in the Triangle, Lawton decides to put distance between himself and Michelle and Zoe. After setting up a school scholarship for Zoe, Deadshot kills several supervillains targeting him and then fakes his own death in an explosion. He decides to act more covertly for the time being. His efforts in the Triangle also inspire Green Arrow to take more interest in the area, ensuring that Zoe and Michelle's neighborhood remains protected.

Lawton decides to do right by his daughter, and embarks on a lethal war on the local gangs that plague the area. The series ends with Deadshot faking his death, having realized a normal life is not for him, but also having mostly cleared up the area and convincing Green Arrow to patrol it more regularly.

In the 2005–2006 Infinite Crisis storyline, Deadshot briefly operates with the Secret Six, joining other villains who are recruited by Lex Luthor. For accepting membership, Deadshot is offered the reward of ruling North America; if he declines, his punishment will be the destruction of the Triangle in Star City, where Michelle and Zoe live. At the conclusion of their main objective, Deadshot is rewarded with significant money that he sends to Michelle. Despite no longer being employed by Lex Luthor, the Secret Six remain active for a time and Deadshot stays as a member. He develops a grudging friendship with teammate Catman, another former enemy of Batman's. When this version of the Secret Six disbands, Deadshot is said to have returned to Amanda Waller's new Suicide Squad.

Deadshot, along with Scandal Savage, Bane, Rag Doll, and Catman reunite the Secret Six. The team is hired to retrieve Tarantula from Alcatraz Island and find a card which allows the user to escape Hell for free. Soon, the Six are attacked by a small army of super-villains, all wanting to recover the card and collect the reward of $20 million for each of the Six. It is later revealed that Junior is Rag Doll's sister and the daughter of the first Rag Doll. Tarantula sacrifices herself and Junior, seemingly destroying the card. The card survives and comes into Scandal's possession.

=== The New 52 ===
In The New 52 (a 2011 reboot of the DC Comics universe), a new timeline is presented which features Deadshot with a significantly different past. Rather than a child of wealth, he is a child born to poverty who then joins the military before becoming an assassin for hire. He has a daughter named Suchin Lawton who has Japanese heritage. His children from the previous timeline, Edward and Zoe, are not mentioned.

Before joining the Suicide Squad, Lawton is described as a Batman villain and a rival of Mad Dog, a bounty hunter. He also is bitter enemies with Captain Boomerang. In the New 52 stories, he no longer sports his trademark mustache except at one point to grow one to cover a scar.

Deadshot is arrested for a failed assassination of a U.S. Senator by Batman and is sentenced to life in prison. Later, he is recruited to be part of the Suicide Squad in exchange for early release. Deadshot is made team leader due to his skill under pressure. He develops a casual relationship with new teammate Harley Quinn. Deadshot later grows disillusioned with the group after a planned visit with his daughter, his first since his arrest, is withheld from him.

Deadshot ultimately sacrifices his life to kill the evil cult member Regulas. Deadshot is later resurrected, possibly through genetic material taken from Resurrection Man during an earlier mission.

During the 2013–2014 "Forever Evil" story line, the Justice League teams are seemingly killed. To ensure Earth is protected, Amanda Waller pays Deadshot to reunite the Suicide Squad. Deadshot's first visit is to Harley Quinn.

=== DC Rebirth ===
In 2016, DC Comics implemented another relaunch of its books called "DC Rebirth" which restored its continuity to a form much as it was prior to "The New 52". Deadshot's pre-New 52 history is restored. When a character mentions having heard that Deadshot grew up in poverty, Lawton now remarks that this was a lie he told.

In the story "The War of Jokes and Riddles," it is retroactively revealed that soon after his first defeat at Batman's hands, Deadshot sided with the Joker in a gang war against the Riddler and other criminals. During this time, he sustained head trauma and was hospitalized after a battle with Batman.

== Powers and abilities ==
Deadshot possesses no superhuman powers but is regarded as the greatest marksman in the DC Universe. His uncannily accurate aim has been described as near-superhuman, and he regularly boasts that he never misses his target. Deadshot is so proficient with firearms and projectiles that he can make his shots ricochet off of structures and around corners, and kill multiple targets at the same time. He once shot an apple off of Captain Boomerang's head with his eyes closed. He was also able to graze the skull of a flying Enchantress when asked to subdue her non-lethally.

Deadshot is also a skilled hand-to-hand combatant, having held his own against the likes of Batman and Green Arrow on several occasions. He has also fought the rival assassin Deathstroke to a standstill.

=== Equipment ===
Deadshot's mask is equipped with a telescopic sight over his right eye lens that enhances his aim. His primary weapons are two guns mounted on each wrist and a sniper rifle, although he possesses an expertise with all firearms and projectiles. Deadshot is bilingual, and learned to speak Russian in his youth.

== Collected editions ==
Title	Material collected	Published date	ISBN
Deadshot: Beginnings	Deadshot (vol. 1) #1-4, Batman #369, Detective Comics #474, 518	November 2013	978-1401242985
Deadshot: Bulletproof	Deadshot (vol. 2) #1-5, Batman: Legends of the Dark Knight #214	April 2015	978-1401255190
Suicide Squad Most Wanted: Deadshot	Material from Suicide Squad Most Wanted: Deadshot and Katana #1-6	August 2016	978-1401263805

== Other versions ==
- Deadeye, a composite character based on Deadshot and Marvel Comics character Bullseye, appears in the Amalgam Comics universe.
- Deadshot appears in Tiny Titans.
- An alternate timeline version of Deadshot appears in The New 52: Futures End. This version is an inmate of Belle Reve Penitentiary who lost an arm under unspecified circumstances before being freed by Amanda Waller. He is later killed while battling a clone of Deathstroke.
- A second version of Deadshot named Will Evans appears in the main DC universe with Brian Buccellato and Viktor Bogdanovic influenced by the character's reinvention in the DC Extended Universe. His parents and sister were killed by drug dealers' stray bullets before becoming a mercenary protégé of his idol and ultimately gets recruited by Amanda Waller's Task Force X. The second Deadshot went off script by killing a crime syndicate's members that his teammates were meant to kidnap so he returned to being a killer for hire and kidnapped Suchin Lawton to lure out the original in an even match between the two Deadshots, but the original Deadshot killed him.

== In other media ==
=== Television ===
==== Live-action ====
Michael Rowe as Deadshot in Arrow

- Deadshot appears in the tenth season of Smallville, portrayed by Bradley Stryker. This version is a member of the Suicide Squad who sports long hair and western-steampunk attire.
- Floyd Lawton / Deadshot appears in Arrow, portrayed by Michael Rowe. This version is a former Staff Sergeant and Army veteran with post-traumatic stress disorder who is estranged from his wife and daughter. Introduced in the first season as an assassin who laces his bullets with curare, Deadshot attains a cybernetic monocle from China White after Oliver Queen injures his right eye. Deadshot is recruited into A.R.G.U.S.'s Suicide Squad in the second season, and he seemingly sacrifices himself to save them in the third season, though John Diggle states that Deadshot's body was never recovered.
  - Lawton's Earth-2 counterpart appears in the spin-off series The Flash episode "Welcome to Earth-2". This version is a detective for the Central City Police Department who is mockingly nicknamed "Deadshot" for his poor marksmanship.

==== Animation ====
Deadshot in Justice League

- Deadshot appears in series set in the DC Animated Universe (DCAU), voiced by Michael Rosenbaum. Introduced as a recurring villain in Justice League, Deadshot returns in Justice League Unlimited as a member of Project Cadmus' Task Force X after Rick Flag Jr. has him spared from death row and released into his custody.
- Deadshot appears in the Batman: The Brave and the Bold episode "Night of the Batmen!", voiced by Tom Kenny.
- Deadshot appears in Justice League Action, voiced by Christian Slater.
- Deadshot makes non-speaking cameo appearances in Harley Quinn.
- Deadshot appears in Suicide Squad Isekai, voiced by Reigo Yamaguchi in the original Japanese version and by Jovan Jackson in the English dub.
- Floyd Lawton makes a cameo appearance in the Batman: Caped Crusader episode "Moving Target", voiced by Roger Craig Smith.

=== Film ===
- Deadshot appears in a self-titled segment of Batman: Gotham Knight, voiced by Jim Meskimen. As in his comic book debut, this version dresses in an elegant fashion and displays a fear of death.
- Deadshot makes a non-speaking cameo appearance in Superman/Batman: Public Enemies.
- Deadshot appears in Batman: Assault on Arkham, voiced by Neal McDonough.
- Floyd Lawton / Deadshot appears in Suicide Squad (2016), portrayed by Will Smith. This version is an African-American hitman who is apprehended by Batman, incarcerated in Belle Reve Penitentiary, and blackmailed into joining Amanda Waller's Suicide Squad.
- Deadshot makes a non-speaking cameo appearance in Scooby-Doo! & Batman: The Brave and the Bold.
- Deadshot appears in Suicide Squad: Hell to Pay, voiced again by Christian Slater.
- Deadshot makes a non-speaking cameo appearance in Injustice.

=== Video games ===
- Deadshot appears in Batman: The Video Game.
- Deadshot appears as a background non-player character (NPC) in the Stryker's Island stage of Injustice: Gods Among Us. Additionally, the DCEU and Arkham Origins incarnations of the character are playable in the mobile version.
- The DCEU incarnation of Deadshot appears as a playable character in Suicide Squad: Special Ops.
- Deadshot appears as a character summon in Scribblenauts Unmasked: A DC Comics Adventure.
- Deadshot appears as a playable character in Injustice 2, voiced by Matthew Mercer. This version is a member of Gorilla Grodd's "Society".

==== Lego ====
- Deadshot appears as an unlockable character in the Nintendo 3DS and PlayStation Vita versions of Lego Batman 2: DC Super Heroes.
- Deadshot appears as a playable character in Lego Batman 3: Beyond Gotham, voiced by Robin Atkin Downes.
- Deadshot appears in Lego DC Super-Villains, voiced again by Matthew Mercer. This version is a member of the Legion of Doom.
- Deadshot appears as a non-player character (NPC) in Lego Batman: Legacy of the Dark Knight.

==== Batman: Arkham ====
Two incarnations of Deadshot appear in the Batman: Arkham franchise.

- The first incarnation of Deadshot is introduced as a boss in Batman: Arkham City, voiced by Chris Cox. He makes subsequent appearances in Batman: Arkham Origins, Batman: Arkham Origins Blackgate, and Batman: Arkham Shadow.
- The second incarnation of Deadshot appears as a playable character in Suicide Squad: Kill the Justice League, voiced by Bumper Robinson. This version is African-American and claims that the first Deadshot is an impostor. In-game dialogue implies that he's the original, while the other is speculated to be a multiversal variant.

=== Miscellaneous ===
- Deadshot appears in the Young Justice tie-in comic book.
- The Arrowverse incarnation of Deadshot appears in the Arrow tie-in comic book of the same name, the non-canonical tie-in comic Arrow: Season 2.5, and The Flash: Season Zero.
- The first incarnation of Deadshot from the Batman: Arkham franchise appears in the Batman: Arkham Knight prequel comic book.
- A character loosely based on Deadshot named "The Killer" appears in Mark Millar's Wanted.
  - A character based on the Killer called "Cross" appears in the film adaptation (portrayed by Thomas Kretschmann) and Wanted: Weapons of Fate.
- Deadshot appears in the Batman: The Telltale Series tie-in comic "The Sins of the Father". This version is a wealthy socialite who killed his parents and inherited their fortune from real estate and moved into private security and military contracting.

== See also ==
- List of Batman family enemies
- Bullseye, a similar assassin from Marvel Comics
