= Scandal Savage =

Fictional comic book villain

- Scandal Savage as depicted in Villains United #4 (October 2005). Art by Dale Eaglesham.

Publication information
- Publisher: DC Comics
- First appearance: Villains United #1 (July 2005)
- Created by: Gail Simone; Dale Eaglesham

In-story information
- Alter ego: Scandal Savage
- Species: Metahuman
- Place of origin: New Earth
- Team affiliations: Injustice Society; Secret Six
- Abilities: Enhanced durability Advanced hand-to-hand combatant Expert driver Wields wrist-mounted blades

Scandal Savage is a character appearing in American comic books published by DC Comics. She first appeared in Villains United #1 (July 2005), and was created by Gail Simone and Dale Eaglesham. She is a member of the Secret Six and the daughter of Vandal Savage.

== Publication history ==
Scandal first appeared as a shrewd businesswoman in Villains United #1 (July 2005). Within this run, her character was developed and revealed by the author to be as deadly a character as any of the others in Secret Six, where she unveiled her trademark "lamentation blades" and battle outfit. In Villains United #6, the character was revealed to be lesbian.

Scandal Savage also makes guest appearances in Birds of Prey following the "Whitewater" story arc.

== Fictional character biography ==
Scandal Savage is the daughter of immortal Vandal Savage and an unknown Brazilian woman, who apparently raised the child in her home country, though trained in combat by her father from childhood on. In an attempt to destroy an alternate Lex Luthor's plans, the real Lex Luthor, under the alias Mockingbird, blackmailed Scandal and five other villains into antagonizing the Secret Society of Super Villains. Despite being outnumbered, Scandal and the rest of the Secret Six defeated the Society on a number of occasions. Eventually, Luthor granted the Six their freedom, telling them that the safeguards placed against their rebellion were lies.

While working with the Six was originally all about saving her mother, Scandal eventually grew to care about her teammates, entering a relationship with fellow member Knockout. During Villains United, Scandal positions Knockout as a mole in the Society. During one of the attacks by the Society, Knockout reveals her true allegiances by saving Scandal during a fight with Talia al Ghul. Knockout then becomes an official member of the Six.

While Scandal and Knockout are vacationing in Bangkok, Knockout is shot and nearly killed by Pistolera. The Secret Six manage to capture Pistolera, but Scandal cannot bring herself to kill her, with Deadshot killing Pistolera in her place. Knockout recovers from her injuries soon after.

After an unknown assailant kills Knockout, Amanda Waller sends Bronze Tiger and Rick Flag to kidnap Scandal. King Faraday offers her a place in the Suicide Squad, but she refuses and promises to kill him. Faraday then orders her to be shipped off to an unknown location.

In the third volume of Secret Six (2008), Scandal is shown to still be depressed over the death of Knockout. Catman and Deadshot tried to cheer her up by having a stripper dressed as Knockout jump out of a cake for her, with one guest calling the display "morally indefensible". Scandal declines the stripper's advances and manages to pull herself together for the Six's new mission. During that time, the Six's new member Bane develops a paternal affection towards Scandal, much to her discomfort and later acceptance. Following the mission's success, Scandal encounters the stripper at a supermarket and learns her name is Liana Kerzner. Despite trying to turn her down again, Liana convinces Scandal to go on a date. After resurrecting Knockout with Neron's "Get Out of Hell Free" card, Scandal proposes a polygamous marriage with Knockout and Liana, which they accept.

In the series JSA, Scandal Savage appears as the leader of the Injustice Society.

== Powers and abilities ==
The full extent of Scandal's powers has yet to be revealed, although it would appear that, owing to her father's immortality, she is incredibly resilient to harm. She claims to be "damned hard to kill" at the least. In Birds of Prey #107, she took a bullet from Deadshot and was capable of regrowing her damaged organs, talking to and carrying Knockout several minutes later with no apparent ill effects. In Checkmate (vol. 2) #18, it is speculated that she may be fully immortal like her father.

In combat, she often employs retractable, wrist-mounted blades known as the Laminas Pesar or "Lamentation Blades".

== In other media ==
- Characters loosely based on Scandal Savage, Vandal Savage's daughters Cassandra and Olympia Savage, appear in Young Justice, respectively voiced by Zehra Fazal and Jenifer Lewis.
- Scandal Savage appears in Suicide Squad: Hell to Pay, voiced by Dania Ramirez. This version initially works under Vandal Savage until he attempts to have her girlfriend Knockout killed while retrieving a "Get Out of Hell Free" card for him.
- Scandal Savage appears as a character summon in Scribblenauts Unmasked: A DC Comics Adventure.
