= Knockout (DC Comics) =

- Knockout on the cover of Birds of Prey #106, art by Stephane Roux.

Publication information
- Publisher: DC Comics
- First appearance: Superboy (vol. 4) #1 (February 1994)
- Created by: Karl Kesel (writer); Tom Grummett (artist)

In-story information
- Species: New God
- Team affiliations: Secret Six; The Society; Suicide Squad; Female Furies
- Notable aliases: Kay Fury
- Abilities: Superhuman strength, stamina, and durability; Regeneration; Immortality

Knockout is a supervillain appearing in American comic books published by DC Comics. She first appeared in Superboy (vol. 4) #1 (February 1994), and was created by Karl Kesel and Tom Grummett.

A former Female Fury warrior from the hellish planet Apokolips like Big Barda, Knockout also escaped to Earth. Though while Barda became a superheroine, Knockout became a supervillainess. She later joined the Secret Six team, which committed actions more as antiheroes.

== Fictional character biography ==
=== Superboy (vol. 4) ===
Knockout is originally from Apokolips, where she was a member of Granny Goodness's Female Furies. After Big Barda escaped Apokolips with Mister Miracle, Knockout decided to leave the Furies as well. At one point when she was chained to a wall in the Fire Pits as punishment, she broke her chains and leapt into the fires. As she did so, a Boom Tube opened and took her to Hawaii.

Knockout first battles Superboy shortly after he moved to Hawaii. Later, she is recruited to join Amanda Waller's Suicide Squad for an attack against the international crime cartel Silicon Dragons. Knockout is supposedly killed when the Squad leave her and King Shark in the exploding base. She later appears alive and assists Superboy in a battle against Valor, although she and Superboy did spar.

The Female Furies arrive on Hawaii to reclaim Knockout, battling her, Superboy, and a small group of police officers. One police officer died during the battle, but the Furies are driven off when Dubbilex uses his mental abilities to convince them that Knockout had died. Dubbilex investigates the murder of the police officer, using his mental powers to scan the memories of most of the survivors. He realizes that Knockout had killed the officer simply because he was in her way.

The police attempt to bring Knockout in, but Superboy refuses to believe she is guilty, forcing the two to briefly hide from the law. The two encounter an explorer named Victor Volcanum, whom Knockout hopes Superboy will kill as a sign of deference to her. Superboy refuses, with Knockout killing Volcanum instead. Upon seeing Knockout's true colors, Superboy defeats her and brings her into custody.

She later escapes and joins the Secret Society of Super Villains as a mole at the request of her lover, Scandal Savage.

=== Secret Six ===
Knockout dies, art by Nicola Scott.

Knockout joins the Secret Six mercenary team alongside Scandal. A mission that brings the Secret Six into conflict against the Birds of Prey has Knockout challenge her former inspiration, Barda, in single combat. During the Final Crisis event, along with most of the New Gods, she is killed by Infinity-Man.

Scandal is shown to have kept the "Get out of Hell Free" card the Six had been tasked with capturing and had falsely reported lost or destroyed. When Rag Doll is discovered to have stolen the card, Scandal murders him. Black Alice teleports the rest of the team to Hell to retrieve the card, where Scandal discovers that Knockout has been brainwashed and betrothed to Rag Doll. A violent fight breaks out, which ends with the team escaping with Knockout in tow.

Following her resurrection and a period of mental recovery, she rejoins the Secret Six and accompanies the team on a mission to Gotham to kill several of Batman's allies. While in Gotham, Scandal proposes a polygamous marriage between Knockout, herself, and Liana Kerzner, a stripper who she dated while Knockout was dead. Knockout accepts the proposal just before the team is ambushed by Batman and several other superheroes. In The New 52, Scandal and Knockout are shown to have survived the battle and are living with Liana. The three make plans to have a child together, and Scandal has even chosen Catman as a sperm donor.

=== Post-DC Rebirth ===
In Generations, Dominus pulls Knockout and a group of supervillains from various timelines to stop a group of heroes from thwarting his plot to change history. However, the villains later defect to the heroes to help them defeat Dominus.

In Catwoman (vol. 5), following DC's Infinite Frontier relaunch, Knockout appears as one of several supervillains gathered by Clayface to help Catwoman defend her neighborhood from Gotham City's new fascistic mayor and paramilitaristic enforcement militia.

Knockout then turns up working for Intergang in Metropolis.

== Powers and abilities ==
Knockout is a highly trained warrior and master of unarmed combat. Like most other New Gods of the planet Apokolips, she has immense strength, stamina, and durability, as well as a healing factor.

== In other media ==
- Knockout appears in Suicide Squad: Hell to Pay, voiced by Cissy Jones. This version works under Vandal Savage alongside her lover Scandal Savage.
- Knockout appears in Harley Quinn, The Animated Series: Legion of Bats!, a Harley Quinn spinoff comic-book.
- Knockout appears as a character summon in Scribblenauts Unmasked: A DC Comics Adventure.
