= Catman (DC Comics) =

DC Comics character

- Catman as depicted for the limited series Secret Six (2025), art by Stephen Segovia.

Publication information
- Publisher: DC Comics
- First appearance: Detective Comics #311 (January 1963)
- Created by: Bill Finger (writer); Jim Mooney (artist)

In-story information
- Alter ego: Thomas Blake
- Species: Human
- Team affiliations: Secret Six; The Misfits
- Abilities: Olympic-level athlete Skilled hand-to-hand combatant Proficiency with bladed weapons Superb hunter, observant and tracker with an extraordinary sense of smell Mastery of various weapons and equipment

Catman (Thomas Blake) is a character appearing in American comic books published by DC Comics. He is part of Batman's growing roster of enemies, debuting in the mid-1960s.

For decades, the character rarely appeared in comic books, as Batman stories returned to darker themes. A modern revival of the character in the pages of Green Arrow many years later depicted a Catman down on his luck, clinging to past glories, overweight, and pathetic.

In 2006, however, the character was rehabilitated by writer Gail Simone, depicting Blake as having picked himself up from the gutter, restoring his physical fitness and gaining a new sense of purpose and dignity while living with lions in Africa. Stories since then have depicted him as an antihero and the leader of the mercenary team Secret Six.

== Publication history ==
Catman first appeared in Detective Comics #311 (January 1963) and was created by Bill Finger and Jim Mooney.

A different Cat-Man once opposed the Blackhawks in Blackhawk #141, but he has no connection with the more prominent Batman villain.

== Fictional character biography ==
=== Origins ===
==== Pre-Crisis ====
Catman was Thomas Blake, a world-famous hunter who turned to crime because he had grown bored with the job and squandered most of his money. He became a burglar who committed his crimes in a catsuit made of ancient African cloth and modeled after Catwoman's disguise. Catwoman was none too pleased to have her modus operandi copied, which resulted in Catwoman being wrongly implicated in Catman's crimes at least once, so she initially helped Batman against him.

As with many Batman villains in their first appearances, Catman was originally a gimmicked villain who stole cat-themed items. His weapons of choice were steel claw-tipped gloves and the razor edged "catarang".

Cover to Detective Comics#311, art by Dick Dillin.

Catman would reappear once more, this time revealing that the orange African cloth in his uniform gave him nine lives. The character first shows his capability for good causes when he rescues Batwoman from nearly dying. He gives her some of his costume fabric, believing she too will have nine lives. He resumes his criminalistic ways, but Batwoman (temporarily infiltrating his trust to be his new partner, with a new costume as "Cat-Woman") reasons the entire cloth has only nine lives, not individual pieces, and manipulates events until Catman only has one remaining. Batwoman attempts to convince him to turn himself in, but Catman attempts to kill her so he can escape, before being defeated by Batman and Robin.

=== Outcast ===
In 1992, Catman appeared in Batman: Shadow of the Bat as a member of a team called "the Misfits", led by Killer Moth. The Misfits were portrayed as third-rate villains trying to prove themselves, foreshadowing Brad Meltzer's treatment of the character in Green Arrow.

Catman reappeared in a 1995 crossover between Shadow of the Bat and Catwoman. In this story, the cloth that Catman's costume was made from was retconned as belonging to a South Sea cat cult. Catwoman was hired by the cult to return the cloth, but gave them a fake.

Catman remained in limbo until 2003, when he resurfaced as a foe of Green Arrow. Written by Brad Meltzer, Catman was portrayed as a pathetic, overweight loser who was looked down upon by other villains and who is easily defeated by Green Arrow. His hair had been dyed black, which he thought "made [him] look tougher".

Monsieur Mallah sends Warp to abduct Blake, the implication being that Catman had met a rather grisly end as Mallah's dinner; this situation is alluded to by Blake, when he joins the Secret Six: "You know you've hit rock bottom when a monkey and a Frenchman don't consider you worth killing". When he later meets Mallah, he comments that he has no desire to see the gorilla's stomach again.

=== Secret Six ===
In the 2005 mini-series Villains United, Catman resurfaced in Africa, where he attempted to resalvage his life and began living with a pride of lions. He used this time to lose weight and regain his sense of self-worth and fighting skills. This 'perfect existence' would be shattered by the arrival of the Secret Society of Super Villains, however. Seeking to unite all of Earth's super-villains under his control, Lex Luthor (secretly Alexander Luthor Jr. of the original Earth-Three in disguise) sought to recruit Catman into the fold as a minion, only to be rejected. It was initially believed that an angry Lex Luthor had Deathstroke kill the lions Catman was living with in retaliation for being rejected by a "nobody" but this was later revealed to have been a misdirection.

Catman vowed revenge against Luthor, and was subsequently recruited into a criminal syndicate known as the Secret Six. Together, the Secret Six waged war against the Secret Society of Super Villains under the direction of an individual known only as Mockingbird. During that time he found out that it was in fact fellow Secret Six member Deadshot who had killed his lions, so that he would join the organization. Deadshot would later apologize, and Catman forgave him. Although the two were reluctant allies at first, the two soon bonded and became what one could loosely call friends.

Under Villains United writer Gail Simone, Catman is depicted as an antihero with a sense of honor. He possesses physical abilities that allow him to fight Monsieur Mallah to a standstill and blind Captain Nazi.

He is different from most other Batman villains in the sense that he has noble and heroic qualities. While Cheshire notes that Blake behaves more like a hero than a villain, he sees heroes such as the Justice League as being arrogant and abusive of their power, as seen when he confronts Green Arrow about the Doctor Light incident. It has been revealed that during his time with the Six he impregnated Cheshire and that the two now have a son, Thomas Jr.

In Gail Simone's Birds of Prey #104, the Secret Six run into Barbara Gordon's team. Huntress and Catman – out of disguise – dance together, with hints of an attraction. The two teams battle, six members for six, Catman paired against Huntress amidst sexual innuendo, but the fray ends with the resurrection of Ice. Commenting upon Catman's reasonings, Knockout claimed that he had "gone soft".

In 2008's Salvation Run #3, Catman and former Secret Six teammates Scandal Savage and Rag Doll are depicted amongst DC's larger villain population, exiled on the planet Cygnus 4019.

Catman reappeared in Secret Six, which takes place after the events of Salvation Run. Blake spent some time back in Africa, where he brutally attacked a gang of poachers and may have left them for dead. His actions have led Catman to wonder if he has the temperament to be on the side of the angels.

It was in his role as leader of the Secret Six that Catman faced Batman again after many years. Batman tried to warn Catman and his team to not accept their mission to break someone out of Alcatraz. The non-personal warning did not work, so Batman went to confront Catman. Catman said in response: "The old me? Probably would've whooped his milk and cookies". He made no hesitation to throw the first punch at the Dark Knight. During the fight, Batman even offered to pay the Secret Six off, but to no avail. Catman's main goal was just to keep Batman distracted as the Secret Six broke Tarantula out of prison.

=== The New 52 ===
After the cancellation of Secret Six in August 2011, Gail Simone revealed that Catman would be written as bisexual, and that she had planned to reveal this in a story arc that was cut short by The New 52 relaunch published in September 2011. Simone has also said that she planned to make Catman's sexuality canon the next time she wrote Catman in a book.

In The New 52, Catman made his debut, with an updated outfit, in the December 2014 reboot of Secret Six. In the first issue of the series, he is captured by a mysterious group and is put in a strange holding cell with the new team. As Simone had promised in her earlier tweet, his bisexuality was confirmed in the issue when he is seen flirting with both a man and a woman.

== Powers and abilities ==
Catman is an Olympic-level athlete and skilled hand-to-hand combatant, able to hold his own against fighters in the DC universe including Bronze Tiger, Batman, and a lion. He is also a hunter and tracker, possessing a heightened sense of smell and sight. He is also a skillful observer with the ability to notice and perceive things.

He wears razor-tipped gauntlets and uses a sharp-edged Catarang, modeled after Batman's Batarang, and a utility belt similar to Batman's. The belt frequently has a smiley face button, a trophy he claimed from a misleading pilot on a mission with the Secret Six. Catman has claimed several times, both in his early appearances and modern ones, that his cape is mystical and able to restore mortal wounds.

He was once the owner of a pet Siberian tiger named Rasputin, which was trained and helped him commit crimes. Rasputin has not been utilized in his modern appearances to date.

Cover to Batman: Legends of the Dark Knight#46, art by Russ Heath.

== Other versions ==
- An alternate version of Catman, Selina Kyle's brother Karl Kyle, is a burglar motivated to steal by an intense sibling rivalry with his sister.
- An alternate version of Catman appears in Batman: Legends of the Dark Knight. This version is a serial killer who wields knife-like claws.
- An alternate timeline version of Catman appears in the Flashpoint event. This version is the leader of a South African resistance before being killed by Gorilla Grodd.

== In other media ==
=== Television ===
- Thomas Blake appears in The New Batman Adventures episode "Cult of the Cat", voiced by Scott Cleverdon. This version is the leader of a cat-worshiping cult.
- T. Blake / Cat Man appears in the Justice League episode "Legends", voiced by Stephen Root. He is a member of the Justice Guild of America, a team of superheroes who are merely comic characters in the series’ primary universe but real in an alternate universe. Cat Man incorporates elements of Batman and Wildcat.
- Catman appears in Batman: The Brave and the Bold, voiced by Thomas F. Wilson.

=== Film ===
- Catman makes a non-speaking cameo appearance in Superman/Batman: Public Enemies.
- Catman makes a non-speaking appearance in The Lego Batman Movie.
- Catman makes a non-speaking appearance in Scooby-Doo! & Batman: The Brave and the Bold.
- Catman makes a non-speaking cameo appearance in Injustice.
- Catman appears in Batman: Knightfall, voiced by Luis Bermudez.

=== Video games ===
- Catman appears in Batman: The Brave and the Bold – The Videogame, voiced again by Thomas F. Wilson.
- Catman appears as a character summon in Injustice: Gods Among Us.
- Catman appears as a character summon in Scribblenauts Unmasked: A DC Comics Adventure.

=== Miscellaneous ===
- Catman appears in The Batman Adventures. This version hews closer to the comics' Thomas Blake, with a history as a former big game hunter who sells live animals to zoos and circuses. Additionally, he dons a masculine variation of Catwoman's suit and commits copycat crimes in an attempt to gain her romantic attention.
- Catman appears in Batman: Arkham Knight – Genesis as an associate of the Joker, Harley Quinn, and Blockbuster before he is killed by Jason Todd.
- Catman makes a cameo appearance in Batman '66 #30.

== Reception ==
In 2013, ComicsAlliance ranked Catman as #9 on their list of the "50 Sexiest Male Characters in Comics".

== See also ==
- List of Batman family enemies
- List of DC Comics characters
