= Dale Eaglesham =

Canadian comic book illustrator

- Area: Penciller
- Notable works: Fantastic Four; Green Lantern, vol. 3 JSA, vol. 3 Villains United
- Awards: 2008 Shuster Awards: Outstanding Canadian Comic Book Artist of the year Wizard Fan Appreciation Awards for Villains United: Best Miniseries and Best Special

Dale Eaglesham is a Canadian comic book illustrator who has been working in the American industry since 1986. Titles he worked for include Conan, Punisher, Green Lantern, Villains United, Justice Society of America and Fantastic Four. In 2008, the Shuster Awards selected him as Outstanding Canadian Comic Book Artist of the year.

== Career ==
Eaglesham has worked with DC Comics, Marvel, Dark Horse, and CrossGen among others. He worked exclusively for DC Comics for several years, before returning to Marvel in early 2009. There, his work includes pencilling Fantastic Four and Steve Rogers: Super-Soldier. He also worked on Incredible Hulk for a three-issue arc with writer Greg Pak.

On February 15, 2011, Marvel announced that it was bringing back Canadian superhero team Alpha Flight, with writers Fred Van Lente and Greg Pak as the writing team, and Eaglesham on pencils. Speaking about the project, the Canadian artist said "I'm pretty excited to build a Canadian superteam into a force in the mainstream...there's a lot of depth to these characters and a lot of potential. If there's anything different in my approach at all, it'll be an authenticity to the locales because this is where I live."

One feature of Eaglesham's work for the first two years of his return to Marvel was that his projects were uninked, in other words colored and shot directly from his finished pencils. His work on Fantastic Four and Steve Rogers: Super-Soldier also earned him the nickname "The Evolutionary Jack Kirby," referring to Eaglesham's ability to keep his art fresh and innovative while paying homage to classic comic book art.

Previous work for DC Comics included the Villains United series, which was written by Gail Simone. He is also known for his work inaugurating Batman: Gotham Knights, as well as his two-year run on Green Lantern, which included the landmark issue #150 featuring Jim Lee's new Kyle Rayner costume. He wrapped up his award-winning run on Justice Society of America in December 2008, with his final issue released in April 2009.

== Awards ==
2008 Joe Shuster Award for Outstanding Canadian Comic Book Artist (for Justice Society of America #2-4, 6-7, 9-11)

== Bibliography ==
=== Acclaim ===
- Eternal Warrior #45-46 (1995)
- Eternal Warrior: Digital Alchemy (1997)
- Killer Instinct Special #1 (1996)
- X-O Manowar #66 (1996)

=== DC ===
Variant cover for the second printing of Villains United #1 featuring Eaglesham's uninked pencils.

- 52 #14, 25 (among other artists) (2006)
- Batgirl #12 (2001)
- Batman #564, 574 (1999–2000)
- Batman 80-Page Giant #3 (2000)
- Batman Chronicles #18 (1999)
- Batman: Gotham Knights #1-2, 5 (2000)
- Batman: Legends of the Dark Knight #116, 126 (1999–2000)
- Batman: Shadow of the Bat #84, 92 (1999)
- Detective Comics #731, 741 (1999–2000)
- Firestorm, vol. 3, #11 (2005)
- Green Lantern, vol. 3, #136, 138, 141, 143-145, 147, 149-151, 153-156, 158-161 (2001–03)
- Green Lantern: Our Worlds At War #1 (2001)
- Hawkman, vol. 4, #38 (2005)
- H.E.R.O. #15-22 (2004–05)
- JLA, vol. 3, 80-Page Giant #3 (2000)
- JSA, #81 (2006)
- Justice Society of America, vol. 3, #1-4, 6-7, 9-12, 14 (full art); #15, 18 (among other artists) (2007–08)
- The Kamandi Challenge (limited series) #1 (2017)
- Legion of Superheroes, vol. 4, #11 (2005)
- President Luthor: Secret Files and Origins #1 (2001)
- Superman #649 (among other artists) (2006); Annual #9 (full art) (1997)
- Shazam!, vol. 3, #1, #3 (2018-2019)
- Teen Titans, vol. 5, Annual #1 (among other artists) (2006)
- Villains United, miniseries, #1-2, 4-6 (2005)
- Villains United: Infinite Crisis Special (2006)

Cover for Punisher Year One #1, painted over Eaglesham's pencils.

=== Marvel ===
- Alpha Flight, miniseries, #1-8 (2011-2012)
- Amazing Spider-Man #591 (among other artists) (2009)
- Amazing Spider-Man: Extra!, miniseries, #3 (among other artists) (2009)
- Captain America #600 (2009)
- Captain America, vol. 3, #6-7 (1998)
- Conan the King #53 (1989)
- Excalibur #122, 124-125 (1998)
- Fantastic Four #570-572, 575-578 (2009–2010)
- Guardians of the Galaxy #42, 43 (1993)
- Hulk #53-57 (2012)
- Incredible Hulk #623-625 (2011)
- Iron Man, vol. 7, #9-12 (2013)
- 2099 A.D. Genesis #1 (1996)
- Punisher Annual #6 (1993)
- Punisher Back-to-School Special #2 (1993)
- Punisher Holiday Special #3 (1993)
- Punisher War Zone Annual #2 (1994)
- Punisher: Year One, miniseries, #1-4 (1994–95)
- Savage Sword of Conan (King Kull) #145, 149, 152, 157, 185, 215 (1988–93)
- Silver Surfer, vol. 2, Annual #4, 6 (1991–93)
- Steve Rogers: Super Soldier, miniseries, #1-4 (2010)
- Uncanny X-Men #19 (2012)
- What If? #200 (2011)
- What If?, vol. 2, #30, 45 (1991–93)

=== Other publishers ===
- Dark Horse Presents #56-58, 60-61, 63-64 (Dark Horse, 1991–92)
- Sigil #36-38, 40-42 (CrossGen, 2003–04)
