= Down to Earth (comics) =

Storyline in the Wonder Woman comics

- Cover of Wonder Woman: Down to Earth 2004, art by Greg Land
- Publisher: DC Comics
- Publication date: October 2003 – March 2004
- Genre: Superhero; Mythology
- Title(s): Wonder Woman #195-200
- Main character(s): Wonder Woman, Veronica Cale, Doctor Psycho, Silver Swan

Creative team
- Writer: Greg Rucka
- Artist: Drew Johnson
- Inker: Ray Snyder

"Down to Earth" is a Wonder Woman story arc, marking the start of writer Greg Rucka's four-year run on Wonder Woman.

== Plot ==
A new member joins the Themysciran Embassy, by the name of Jonah McCarthy. As people hear other people talk about who and what Wonder Woman is from their point of view, preparations are underway for Wonder Woman to release her first book called "Reflections: A Collection of Essays and Speeches", which contains poems and essays reinforcing her "world view". At the same time this is all happening, Diana herself is bringing to justice a corrupt tyrannical African General on behalf of the United Nations. When all this is completed, Diana returns home and the book is published and released.

"Reflections" causes praise, as well as a stir, with some sections of the community not happy with the views she shares. A mysterious woman, Veronica Cale, who hates Diana so much, sets herself on destroying Diana's reputation by any and all means, by using her book to create negativity toward the Amazon. She also uses a video camera that captured Wonder Woman and The Flash's disagreement over the best way to handle a Forest Fire, with Diana stopping Flash, saying that the fire must continue as part of its "rebirthing" process, to her advantage.

Thanks to Cale, while Diana's staff fights the media's negative views on Diana thanks to her book, the leader of the outspoken opposition to Diana's book is shot dead outside the Themysciran Embassy, which Cale hopes will bring scandal and accusation upon Wonder Woman and tarnish her reputation irrevocably. Also thanks to Cale, Dr. Psycho and the Silver Swan fight the Amazon that leads to her home at the Themysciran Embassy. Finally, Diana faces off against Silver Swan where she is defeated. But as she is still her friend, she takes her for help to Themyscira.

In a subplot; above in Mount Olympus, the Gods and Goddesses have a disagreement toward Zeus continuing his reign on the throne. When a jealous Hera accuses her husband Zeus of lustfully watching the Amazons, from a fit of rage, she sends the floating islands of Themyscira crashing back down to the sea.

== Backstory ==
Following the success of Wonder Woman: The Hiketeia, Greg Rucka was hired as the next ongoing writer on the Wonder Woman (Vol. 2) title, as of that time, Phil Jimenez was about to end his run, and temporary writers were about to take over for a short period. Even as one of his favorite characters, Rucka made a point that getting inside Diana's head was "murderous", which explains why he decided not to let it be about Wonder Woman, but rather be about how she was perceived in The Hiketeia. Because how he wrote it was praised, he would continue what he had done from the graphic novel onto his run of the book. However, writing the character would become very easy that he wouldn't use that approach for long. As The Hiketeia only allowed a very limited presentation, it was with the ongoing series that Rucka was able to put Wonder Woman in more varied circumstances, where we can see all the facets of the character (compassion, love, passion, and strength).

The main plot point of the arc was Diana's book known as "Reflections: A Collection of Essays and Speeches", where Rucka viewed it from almost every conceivable angle. Even though they were never published, Rucka actually had very detailed notes as to what her book contained, including some sample chapter titles and essay excerpts. All in presenting what kind of topics Diana would be addressing from her written voice. Rucka explains that his idea for the book was less Salman Rushdie, but a book of ideas than attacks in order for Diana to promote her mission in the Man's World. Just like any other book in our reality, while Diana encounters praise, she also encounters controversy. It is seen when a conservative group wants to censor Diana because they believe what she is saying, her truth, threatens their own.

== In other media ==
The 2019 animated film Wonder Woman: Bloodlines is based on "Down to Earth".
