= List of Wonder Woman supporting characters =

Pin Up by artist Phil Jimenez from Wonder Woman #600, showing many of the character's allies and enemies.

This is a list of Wonder Woman supporting characters.

== Major characters ==
In alphabetical order (with issue and date of first appearance).

Character	First appearance	Description
Amazons	All Star Comics #8 (December 1941)	A nation of eternally youthful and super-powerful women. Notable Amazons include General Antiope, oracle Menalippe, weaponsmith Io, would-be Wonder Woman Orana, and sorceress Magala.
Artemis of Bana-Mighdall	Wonder Woman (vol. 2) #90 (September 1994)	Brash champion of a lost tribe of Amazons, who successfully challenged Diana for the title of Wonder Woman and now is a major leader among the Amazons.
Etta Candy	Sensation Comics #2 (February 1942)	Rotund, chocolate-loving, plucky, and fearless leader of the Beta Lambda sorority at Holiday College, Etta was Wonder Woman's close friend and sidekick. She later became secretary for General Blankenship of the War Department, during the period that the comics series shifted to World War II stories to reflect the first season of the Wonder Woman TV series. Post-Crisis, Candy was an Air Force officer and later agent in the Department of Metahuman Affairs. Etta was Wonder Woman's best friend and became Steve Trevor's wife but was later retconned into a relationship with Doctor Barbara Minerva.
Gods of Olympus	All Star Comics #8 (December 1941)	The gods of Classical Greek mythology, worshiped by the Amazons. Originally, the patron goddesses worshiped by the amazons were Aphrodite and Athena. Post-Crisis, they were joined by Hestia, Artemis, and Demeter.
Queen Hippolyta	All Star Comics #8 (December 1941)	The queen of the Amazons and Wonder Woman's mother, who fashioned Diana from clay, which was given life and powers by the gods. She has at times, taken up the mantel of Wonder Woman in her daughters absence.
Julia and Vanessa Kapatelis	Wonder Woman (vol. 2) #3 (April 1987)	A Harvard scholar, Julia and her daughter Vanessa became some of Wonder Woman's earliest friends in the post-Crisis timeline. Diana spent years with Julia and Vanessa, forming a familial bond while she was away from Themyscira. Vanessa would later be tortured and brainwashed into becoming the super villain Silver Swan but was able to recover with the help of Diana.
Mala	All Star Comics #8 (December 1941)	Wonder Woman's closest friend among the Amazons, Mala was the first runner-up in the contest to determine who would enter Man's World as Wonder Woman and later became the head of the Amazons’ therapeutic center Reformation Island.
Nubia	Wonder Woman #204 (January 1973)	Originally Diana's long-lost twin sister who was raised by Ares. Later incarnations have seen Nubia as a demon-hunter and resident of Themyscira. She has held the title of both 'Wonder Woman' and Queen of Themyscira.
Paula von Gunther	Sensation Comics #4 (April 1942)	Wonder Woman's first recurring nemesis, the Baroness Paula Von Gunther was a ruthless Nazi spymaster, evil scientist, and femme fatale who later became Wonder Woman's close friend and chief Amazon scientist. Later adaptations would update Paula into being the child of Neo-Nazi terrorists rather than a Nazi herself.
General Phil Darnell	Sensation Comics #3 (March 1942)	Col. (later Gen.) Darnell supervised Steve Trevor's work at Military Intelligence and hired Diana Prince as his secretary. Later, he was head of the Air Force's Special Assignments Branch, tasked with intervening in crises before they develop. This character was replaced with General Blankenship in the first season of the 1970s television series. He was reinstated as Colonel Darnell in the 2017 theatrical film adaptation.
Philippus	Wonder Woman (vol. 2) #1 (February 1987)	General of the Amazons and one of Queen Hippolyta's most trusted warriors as well as her lover. Philippus is one of the amazons responsible for training Princess Diana. In September 2011, The New 52 rebooted DC's continuity. Philippus was not seen in this new timeline, but she did return following the May 2016 DC Rebirth as a prominent amazon.
Steve Trevor	All Star Comics #8 (December 1941)	An intelligence officer in the United States Army during World War II whose plane crashed in the isolated homeland of the Amazons, Capt. (later Major) Trevor became the paramour of Wonder Woman while, unbeknownst to him, working at U.S. Military Intelligence alongside Wonder Woman in her secret identity, Diana Prince. Post-Crisis, Trevor was an Air Force officer and war veteran. Steve Trevor was also the son of Diana Trevor, aviatrix who crashed onto the Amazons’ island home and died in a battle to save the Amazons. Later designated Deputy Secretary of Defense and then leader of the Department of Metahuman Affairs, Trevor married Etta Candy and remained Diana's close friend. After the events of Rebirth, Steve returned as a young man in origins similar to his Golden Age counterpart, with as romantic connection to Diana, although they would eventually part ways.
Wonder Girl	Wonder Woman #105 (1958)	Wonder Girl is the name of four separate characters in the DC Universe. The first was Diana as a child, called Wonder Girl during the Silver Age. Later, Wonder Girl was a codename used by Donna Troy, Diana's adoptive sister, when she joined the Teen Titans. Cassandra "Cassie" Sandsmark, daughter of Zeus and Helena Sandsmark, became the third Wonder Girl and joined Wonder Woman on several adventures. A young Brazilian Amazon by the name of Yara Flor was given the title of 'Wonder Girl' by Diana after she defended Themyscira from monsters, although she largely acts independently from Diana.

== Other supporting characters ==
Separated in chronological clusters, by major periods in the publication history of the Wonder Woman comic book.

=== Pre-Crisis ===
Characters who appeared before the continuity-altering series Crisis on Infinite Earths.

==== Golden Age ====
- Queen Desira - A Venusian queen.
- Lila Brown - Steve Trevor's secretary, who instantly disliked Diana Prince, she was killed by Doctor Psycho.
- Eve Brown - Lila Brown's sister.
- Holiday Girls - Etta Candy's Beeta Lambda sorority sisters at Holiday College.
- Oscar Sweetgulper - Etta Candy's spindly, nerdy boyfriend, from Starvard College.
- Dean Sourpuss - The grim, heavy-handed dean of Holiday College.
- Professor Zool - A brilliant, though absentminded, eminent scientist at Holliday College.
- Hard Candy - Etta Candy's father, who owns a ranch.
- Sugar Candy - Etta Candy's mother.
- Mint Candy - Etta Candy's brother.
- Draska Nishki - A government spy and blackmailer.
- Marya - A Mexican Mountain Woman who Wonder Woman helped get into Holliday College

==== Impossible Tales ====
- Bird-Boy - (real name: Wingo; alias: Birdman) A suitor of Wonder Girl, and a member of a race of bird people.
- Mer-Boy - (real name: Ronno; alias: Manno) An Atlantean suitor of Wonder Girl.
- Mr. Genie - (real name: Genro) Wonder Tot's magical friend, from the 5th Dimension of Zrfff, the home dimension of Mister Mxyzptlk.

==== Powerless Era ====
- Cathy Perkins - A teen runaway who worked in Diana Prince's boutique
- Drusilla - An Amazon who helped Diana save Themyscira from an attack invasion by Ares
- I Ching - A blind Chinese mystic who became Diana Prince's mentor
- Jonny Double - A down-on-his luck private investigator
- Tim Trench - A shady private detective
- Tony Petrucci - A neighborhood supporter

==== Modern Era ====
===== UN/New York =====
- Justice League of America - Group of super-heroes formed to face new threats against mankind with Wonder Woman as a founding member
- The Kravitzes - Abner and his mother owned the apartment building Diana and Steve Trevor lived in.
- Morgan Tracy - The head of the UN Crisis Bureau, later revealed to be the Prime Planner of the Cartel, which was hired by Kobra to kill Wonder Woman
- Tod - A neighbor in Diana's apartment building.

===== NASA/Houston =====
- Mike Bailey - A fellow astronaut trainee who dated Diana and was secretly Ten of the Royal Flush Gang
- Stacy Macklin - A fellow astronaut trainee, who later became the supervillain Lady Lunar.
- Conrad Starfield
- General Novak

===== Washington, DC =====
- Atalanta - The leader of a lost tribe of Amazons who live in the Amazon River jungle.
- Glitch - An alien "gremlin" who only Steve and some children could see.
- Keith Griggs - A hotshot Air Force major who joined the Special Assignments Bureau and was romantically interested in Diana Prince.
- Lauren Haley - An Air Force lieutenant hired by Special Assignments.
- Howard Huckaby - A hopelessly clumsy, wonky aide to Sen. Covington, and Etta's boyfriend.
- Lisa Abernathy - The daughter of Sen. Abernathy, and network news reporter covering Washington.
- Mother Juju - An old mystic.
- Sen. Russell Abernathy - A disgraced former senator who was landlord for Diana and Etta.
- Sen. Brad Covington - A powerful, media-savvy senator, chair of subcommittee on Central American affairs, with an agenda to aggressively investigate Special Assignments at the urging of a mysterious campaign donor with a grudge against Gen. Darnell; secretly, lover of TV news reporter Lisa Abernathy, unknown to his wife, Mona.
- Sofia Constantinas - Appeared in the pre-Crisis adventures of Wonder Woman as a reformed Greek terrorist who moved to Paradise Island for Amazon training, where she learned the secrets of Wonder Woman's missing memories.

=== Post-Crisis ===
==== Boston ====
- Brian Elliott - Computer genius who attempted to become a supervillain but was slowly persuaded to become a friend and ally
- Camille Sly - A long-lived but still spry former actress who was known in her day as the "Female Fairbanks" for her roles in swashbuckling movies, who rented rooms in her boarding-house to both Diana and Donna Milton
- Donna Milton - Believed herself to be a devious lawyer, always looking out for her own selfish interests and greed, who was the lover of Ares Buchanan and a spy in Wonder Woman's life but gradually became Diana's friend, until Diana deduced that she was Circe, so submerged into the Donna Milton persona that she had forgotten her real identity.
- Ed Indelicato - An inspector on the Boston police force.
- Isabelle Modini - A Boston police officer who initially held a grudge against Diana for leaving her hanging above a street while Diana attempted to talk down a heavily armed villain, but who became Diana's friend after that villain later gave up his own life to save hers.
- Micah Rains - A slacker detective whose "office" was merely a barstool until Diana became his partner.
- Myndi Mayer - A public relations executive who was Diana's representative.

==== Gateway City ====
- Helena Sandsmark - Gateway City museum chief and mother of Cassie Sandsmark, the new Wonder Girl.
- Jason Blood - The human host of Etrigan the Demon and lover of Helena Sandsmark.
- Mike Schorr - A police officer and one time love interest.
- Wonder Dome - A semi-sentient polymorphic entity.
- Harold Champion - Heracles, in a new identity, seeking redemption.
- Justice Society of America - Hippolyta, displaced in time, would join the JSA and carry on a relationship with Ted Grant.
- Sphinx - A mythical creature living on Paradise Island that offered counsel to Wonder Woman.
- Chiron - Legendary Centaur living on Paradise Island that was a trainer of heroes in ancient times.
- Pegasus - Legendary winged horse that makes his home on Paradise Island and progenitor of the Amazons' winged steeds.
- Nu'Bia - First champion of the Amazons and guardian of Doom's Doorway.

==== New York ====
- Alana Dominguez - A secretary for Themysciran embassy staff
- Ferdinand - A minotaur hailing from Kithira, and head chef of the New York Themysciran embassy. Named after the protagonist of "The Story of Ferdinand".
- Io - Amazons chief weapons-mistress.
- Jonah McCarthy - A young attorney hired to join staff of Themysciran embassy, but secretly spying for the shadowy Checkmate organization.
- Leslie Anderson - The co-founder of Cale-Anderson Pharmaceuticals, and doctor who healed Vanessa Kapatelis of the cybernetic implants that had transformed her into the Silver Swan.
- Peter Garibaldi - The press secretary for Themysciran embassy and father of Martin and Bobby Garibaldi.
- Rachel Keast - The legal staff of the Themiscyran embassy.
- Trevor Barnes - Diana's boyfriend, and a United Nations staffer.
- Bobby Barnes - Trevor's nephew and friend of Diana.
- Harbinger - Formerly an agent of the Monitor and member of the New Guardians, Harbinger would join the Amazons at some point and befriend Supergirl

==== Department of Metahuman Affairs ====
- Agents of the D.M.A.
- Gorilla Warriors - Albino gorillas from Gorilla City with superpowers.
- Nemesis - An agent with a talent for impersonation.
- Sarge Steel - The head of DMA.
- Kāne Milohaʻi - The deity Wonder Woman took as her patron saint to infiltrate Paradise Island, her presence banned by divinity. Zeus would slay him and use his heart to give form to Achilles
- Warkiller - Achilles, resurrected with the heart of a slain god, tasked by Zeus to lead the Thalarions.
- Pele - Milohai's daughter that became Wonder Woman's patron after the demise of her father at Zeus' hands.

=== The New 52 ===
In September 2011, The New 52 rebooted DC's continuity. A number of Wonder Woman characters were first introduced in this new timeline.

- Lennox - A British super-soldier, who was Wonder Woman's older half-brother. Lennox, who can transform himself into living, marble-like stone, is the father of Cassandra Sandsmark (Wonder Girl). The first of the half-mortal siblings to reveal himself to Wonder Woman, Lennox was Diana's most trusted ally, before his apparent death at the hands of another half-brother, the evil First Born.
- Milan - A blind prophet and one of Zeus's children. He is a close ally to Orion.
- Orion - A New God from New Genesis and the son of Darkseid.
- Siracca - Also known as the Wind, Siracca is a child of Zeus and Diana's half-sister.
- Zola - A young woman from Virginia told by Hermes she is carrying Zeus' child.

=== Rebirth ===
- Atlantiades - A child of Aphrodite and Hermes and one of the Erotes. They eventually Diana's patron as the God of Love.
- Doctor Barbara Ann Minerva - An archaeologist lecturer that became Diana's best friend after she helped acclimate her to Man's World and taught her English. About two years into their friendship, Barbara was tricked into becoming a monstrous cheetah by the sons of Ares and became Diana's nemesis, although the two still share strong feelings for one another.
- Cadmus, Damon, and Eirene - A pegasus, satyr, and minotaur that found themselves lost from Olympus. They travelled alongside Aphrodite as she lived with Diana for a period of time before her death.
- Jason - Wonder Woman's twin brother, a child of Zeus and Hippolyta. He later retires to live a domestic life on Earth, but remains loyal to Wonder Woman. Like his sister he has been seen in relationships with both men and women.
- Leah - Etta's personal aide at The Picket.
- Maggie - A waitress who befriended Wonder Woman and later gained the Sword of Antiope, becoming an Amazon once she reached Themyscira.
- Manny, David, and Chris - Members of Steve Trevor's Echo-Alpha team.
- The Oddfellows - Steve Trevor's group of mercenaries consisting of Sameer, Charlie, and Chief. The characters were originally created for the Wonder Woman film.
- Ratatosk - A Nordic messenger god in the form of a squirrel, he accompanied Diana while she was in Valhalla.
- Sasha Bordeaux - A.R.G.U.S. agent who had been abducted by Veronica Cale and replaced by an android controlled by Doctor Cyber. After being freed by Wonder Woman and her allies, Bordeaux continued working with A.R.G.U.S.
- Siegfried - A legendary hero, who Diana met while in Valhalla, and ex-husband of Valkyrie super-villainess, Gundra. While Diana had no memories of her former self, she became romantically involved with Siegfried, who she affectionately refers to as "Siggy". He was later resurrected by the villain Doctor Psycho and became roommates with Steve Trevor. On Siegfried's fabled, ill-fated, past marriage to Gudra, writer Michael W. Conrad shared on Twitter, "...it's complicated--and they've had centuries to figure it out."
- Verenus - A hippogriff and servant of Aphrodite.

== Related characters ==
Characters related to Wonder Woman but were not supporting characters in the Wonder Woman comic book.

- Fury (Helena Kosmatos) - Member of the Young All-Stars during WWII, Fury would join the Amazons after meeting a time-displaced Hippolyta.
- Fury (Lyta Trevor Hall) - Pre-Crisis: the daughter of Earth-Two's Wonder Woman and Steve Trevor. Post-Crisis: daughter of Fury and goddaughter of Hippolyta visited annually via time travel by her godmother.
- Justice Society of America - Group of masked heroes Wonder Woman joined as their secretary.
- Marvin White - The son of Diana Prince, a nurse who lent her identity to Wonder Woman. Marvin would later join the Junior JLA.
- Supergirl - Pre-Crisis, Supergirl was embraced as an honorary Amazon. Post-Crisis: Inexperienced at wielding her powers, Supergirl underwent training on Themyscira to develop her abilities and learn about combat by the Amazons (adopted as their sister).
- Mera - The Queen of Atlantis and wife of Arthur Curry / Aquaman, Mera is also an ally and friend to Diana. In the DC Bombshells continuity, they were childhood friends and lovers.

== Characters created for other media ==
Wonder Woman supporting characters created in other media, with no appearances in previous comics.

Character	Media	Actor/Actress	Description
Bryce Candall	Wonder Woman (TV series)	Bob Seagren	A genetically enhanced man who was indestructible and became information technology officer for IADC's Los Angeles field office
Dale Hawthorn	Wonder Woman (TV series)	John Durren	Head of IADC Los Angeles field office. This character was intended to be Diana's new boss for the fourth season which was never produced due to a lack of new cast members for the series and low ratings.
Eve	Wonder Woman (TV series)	Saundra Sharp	Steve's assistant at the IADC
General Phil Blankenship	Wonder Woman (TV series)	John Randolph, Richard Eastham	Head of the War Department office at which Steve, Etta, and Diana worked. He is essentially the comic book character, General Phil Darnell, with a new surname.
IRAC	Wonder Woman (TV series)	Tom Kratochvil	Information Retrieval Associative Computer, super-intelligent computer for IADC. IRAC deduces that Diana is Wonder Woman, but does not divulge her secret.
Joe Atkinson	Wonder Woman (TV series)	Norman Burton	A weathered IADC agent who supervised Steve and Diana. Like Wonder Woman, he conducted special operations in the European Theater in World War II, but the two are not known to have met.
Rover	Wonder Woman (TV series)		A small mobile robot that is an offshoot of IRAC and performs duties such as delivering coffee and sorting mail.

== Characters from comics in other media ==
Some supporting characters from the comic books have made an appearance, or appearances, in other media featuring Wonder Woman.

Character	Live-Action/Animated Media	Actor/Actress
Artemis	Wonder Woman (2009 film)	Rosario Dawson
Artemis	Superman/Batman: Apocalypse	Rachel Quaintance
Artemis	Wonder Woman (2017 film)	Ann Wolfe
Antiope	Wonder Woman (2017 film)	Robin Wright
Etta Candy	Wonder Woman (TV series)	Beatrice Colen
Etta Candy	Wonder Woman (2009 film)	Julianne Grossman
Etta Candy	Wonder Woman (2011 TV pilot)	Tracie Thoms
Etta Candy	Wonder Woman (2017 film)	Lucy Davis
Hippolyta	Wonder Woman TV movie	Charlene Holt
Hippolyta	Wonder Woman (TV series)	Cloris Leachman, Carolyn Jones, Beatrice Straight
Hippolyta	Super Friends	?
Hippolyta	Superman (1988 TV series)	Pat Carroll
Hippolyta	Justice League	Susan Sullivan
Hippolyta	Wonder Woman (2009 film)	Virginia Madsen
Hippolyta	Batman: The Brave and the Bold	Tippi Hedren
Hippolyta	Wonder Woman (2017 film)	Connie Nielsen
Menalippe	Wonder Woman (2017 film)	Lisa Loven Kongsli
Steve Trevor	Wonder Woman TV movie	Kaz Garas
Steve Trevor	Wonder Woman (TV series)	Lyle Waggoner
Steve Trevor	Super Friends	?
Steve Trevor	Justice League	Patrick Duffy
Steve Trevor	Wonder Woman (2009 film)	Nathan Fillion
Steve Trevor	Batman: The Brave and the Bold	Sean Donnellan
Steve Trevor	Wonder Woman (2011 TV pilot)	Justin Bruening
Steve Trevor	Justice League: The Flashpoint Paradox	James Patrick Stuart
Steve Trevor	Justice League: War	George Newbern
Steve Trevor	Wonder Woman (2017 film)	Chris Pine
Wonder Girl (Cassie Sandsmark)	Young Justice: Invasion	Mae Whitman
Wonder Girl (Donna Troy)
Wonder Girl (Donna Troy)	The Superman/Aquaman Hour of Adventure	Julie Bennett
Wonder Girl (Donna Troy)	Super Best Friends Forever	Grey DeLisle
Drusilla / Wonder Girl	Wonder Woman (TV series)	Debra Winger

== See also ==
- List of Wonder Woman enemies
- List of Green Arrow supporting characters
- List of Superman supporting characters
- List of Batman supporting characters
- List of Green Lantern supporting characters
- List of Aquaman supporting characters
- List of the Flash supporting characters
- List of Martian Manhunter supporting characters

== Sources ==
- Beatty, Scott (2009). Wonder Woman: The Ultimate Guide To The Amazon Princess. Dorling Kindersley Publishing. ISBN 978-0-7894-9616-4.
