= Julia Kapatelis =

- Julia Kapatelis; art by Phil Jimenez.

Publication information
- Publisher: DC Comics
- First appearance: Wonder Woman (vol. 2) #3 (April 1987)
- Created by: George Pérez

In-story information
- Full name: Julia Deneiros Kapatelis
- Supporting character of: Wonder Woman

Julia Kapatelis is a fictional character created by writer/artist George Pérez for the Wonder Woman ongoing series published by DC Comics. Debuting in 1987, Kapatelis served as a recurring supporting character for Wonder Woman until the 2000s.

== Fictional character biography ==
=== Childhood ===
Julia was born in Cefalonia, Greece to Greek Orthodox parents Agostos and Maria Deneiros in the 1930s. In June 1937, while still a toddler, Julia went sailing with her parents on the Ionian Sea but fell overboard due to a sudden storm. She was rescued from drowning by the goddess Thetis. Thetis would rescue mortal female children she deemed "special" and safely transport them to the shores of Themyscira's Island of Healing (male children were taken someplace else). Once on the island the Amazon's chief physician Epione would discover them and tend to their care. After this the child would be taken to the royal palace where one Amazon is selected as the child's "Guardian of Inspiration". The Amazon Pythia volunteered to bless baby Julia, granting her great wisdom and strength of spirit. According to Pythia, Julia was the last of hundreds of babies to experience this. This "blessing" in actuality was a subliminal suggestion for the child to teach peace and equality throughout their lives. Once this is done, the child is considered an Amazon and spiritual daughter to the Amazon who blessed them. After a few days of recuperation and blessings the child is taken to the island shores again where she is taken back into the ocean and returned, again by Thetis who magically travels back in time to return the child to the exact point in time when the child first left her homeland. Because of this, Julia's parents believed baby Julia had disappeared under the water for only a few seconds before being pulled back into the boat.

=== Family ===
As with countless other female babies blessed by the Amazons before her, Julia thrived in her newfound spiritual blessing, excelling at every task she undertook. Despite her accomplishments Julia lost her brother, Peter Deneiros, during the war in 1944 as part of the Greek Underground when she was young.

Later, Julia met David Kapatelis while attending Athens University. Julia was studying for her geology major while David was studying for his archaeology major, which Julia took on as her minor study subject herself. They traveled the world together exploring various cultures and histories. At each site they visited Julia would write down her findings and have them published in various academic journals. Eventually Julia married David in Greece. An independent thinker, Julia wanted to keep her maiden name as her family had no one else to carry it on. This upset David's traditional Greek family, so she relented and took David's family name of Kapatelis.

Julia became pregnant while she and David were exploring Scotland. As a joke David wanted to name their unborn child "Nessie" after the local Scottish creature the Loch Ness Monster. Though humored, Julia did not agree but settled on her daughter Vanessa as a close substitute. Julia remained married to David until his death 22 years into their marriage when Vanessa was five years old. He died while exploring ruins in Egypt. Deciding to make a fresh start Julia took Vanessa to live in the U.S. where she eventually became the Dean for the Department of History and Geology at Harvard University. They currently live in the Beacon Hill section of Boston, Massachusetts.

While at Harvard Julia worked alongside a promising student named Helena Sandsmark. Julia mentored Helena over the years and eventually helped Helena become a professor and curator at the Gateway City Museum of Cultural Antiquities. Helena later had a daughter named Cassandra Sandsmark.

=== Diana ===
During her time at Harvard Julia also met Wonder Woman. Julia was the first non-Amazon woman Diana aka Wonder Woman ever met. At that time Diana was unfamiliar with the English language and only spoke her native Themyscirian. As it was a close derivative of Greek, Julia was able to understand Diana to an extent. Julia took Diana into her home and family and taught her not only English but modern history as well.

After Vanessa was attacked by Decay, Julia made Diana's fight her own and helped her battle the war god Ares.

Pythia rescues Julia from Circe, art by Jill Thompson.

Still unaware of her own Amazonian ties, Julia eventually touched Harmonia's talisman during her first meeting with Diana, which resulted with several flashes of memories from Julia's Send Forth period. This confused Julia until she later was invited to Diana's homeland of Themyscira. On her visit she met Pythia and the two felt a strange connection to each other. When Julia and Pythia touched hands, Julia's previous history on Themyscira ran through both Julia's and Pythia's mind, unlocking her forgotten past. Reunited, Julia and Pythia formed a close bond. Similar to Julia's mother-like role to Diana, Pythia developed a protective relationship to Julia. When the witch Circe kidnapped Julia during the War of the Gods storyline, Pythia took it upon herself to rescue Julia, calling Julia her daughter.

When Diana became ambassador of Themyscira, Julia knew Diana would need help adjusting to a world of men and became a sort of foster mother to Diana. During these events Julia managed to keep her personal and academic life pretty full. On trips to Greece Julia reconnected with Stavros Christadoulodou, a noted epigraphist and a close family friend for many years. Though both interested, their relationship remained only as close and respected friends. A similar situation occurred between Julia and one of Vanessa's high school geometry teachers, Horace Westlake. The two dated for a few months until he was killed by Doctor Psycho. At one point Julia was presented with a grant by the National Geographic Society to locate the original Greek city of Themyscira in modern-day Turkey, but Julia canceled the excavation midway through the project because one of Vanessa's friends committed suicide.

Julia's and Diana's friendship endured over many trials, mostly due to Diana's enemies attacking Julia's daughter. It was not until Vanessa was brainwashed and transformed into Silver Swan though that Julia's and Diana's friendship was temporarily put on hold. Julia resented Diana for not protecting Vanessa from Diana's enemies. After some time Julia came to a resolution with Diana. She agreed to have Diana help in her daughter's rehabilitation.

== Alternative versions ==
An alternate reality version of Julia Kapatelis appears in Trinity. This version appears to have never met Diana, resulting in Vanessa not becoming Silver Swan.

In the Absolute Wonder Woman series, Kapatelis appears as Steve Trevor's lawyer.

== In other media ==
- Julia Kapatelis appears in the DC Super Hero Girls episode "#HousePest", voiced by Kari Wahlgren. This version is an archaeology professor with a longstanding fascination towards Amazon culture who suffers from empty nest syndrome due to Vanessa being away at college.
- Julia and Vanessa Kapatelis appear in Wonder Woman: Bloodlines, voiced by Nia Vardalos and Marie Avgeropoulos, respectively. This version of the pair have a strained relationship, which is worsened when Wonder Woman, whom Vanessa is jealous of, moves in with them. After Veronica Cale secretly kills Julia, a grieving Vanessa blames Wonder Woman before she is approached by Villainy Inc., who outfit her with techno-organic augmentations and transform her into Silver Swan so she can seek revenge in exchange for helping them resurrect Medusa. When the Gorgon subsequently betrays the group, Vanessa defects to Wonder Woman's side to help her kill Medusa and reconciles with her.
- Vanessa Kapatelis / Silver Swan appears as a character summon in Scribblenauts Unmasked: A DC Comics Adventure.
