= Decay (DC Comics) =

- The second Decay as depicted in Wonder Woman #4.

Publication information
- Publisher: DC Comics
- First appearance: Howard Pendergast: Daring New Adventures of Supergirl #1 (November 1982); Statue: Wonder Woman (vol. 2) #3 (April 1987); Sarah: Superboy (vol. 6) #21 (August 2013); Howard Pendergast: Supergirl (vol. 8) #4 (October 2025)
- Created by: Daniel Pendergast: Paul Kupperberg; Carmine Infantino; Statue: George Pérez; Sarah: Justin Jordan; Howard Pendergast: Sophie Campbell

In-story information
- Alter ego: Howard Pendergast
- Abilities: Disintegration

Decay is the name of four fictional characters owned by DC Comics. The first was an enemy of the pre-Crisis Supergirl, while the second appeared as a villain in the Wonder Woman comic book series. The third version appeared in The New 52 as an enemy of Superboy, and the fourth version (a reboot of the original) battled the current Supergirl.

== Fictional character biography ==
=== Howard Pendergast ===
A delusional researcher at the Institute for Higher Psychokinetic Study, Howard Pendergast observes modern society as "decay" and manipulates psionic Gayle Marsh into becoming the super-villainess Psi to help him destroy civilization under the ambiguous definition of wiping out "decay". When Psi fails to defeat Supergirl, Pendergast attempts to kill her and she lashes out, turning him into a monster with power over decay. Pendergast attacks Chicago and begins to melt and consume matter, battling Supergirl, before Psi appears and reverts him to his human form.

=== Decay (statue) ===
To win the approval of his father Ares, the minor god Phobos (god of fear) journeys to the Cavern of the Gorgons, where he molds a statuette from malevolent matter scoured from Medusa's heart. He arranges for the item to be delivered to the residence of Julia Kapatelis, a friend of Wonder Woman.

The statue comes to life in the hands of Vanessa Kapatelis, instantly aging her by several decades. Decay then destroys the Kapatelis home in her first attempt to kill Wonder Woman. After failing to do so, Decay embarks on a destructive rampage in Boston with Wonder Woman in pursuit. After a dangerous battle which results in Wonder Woman being aged as well, Wonder Woman ensnares Decay in her Lasso of Truth, which infuses her with the renewing power of Gaia. Decay is overwhelmed and explodes while Wonder Woman's youth is restored. A short time later, Wonder Woman obtains a magic ointment from Themyscira to restore Vanessa's youth as well.

Decay is resurrected by Julian Lazarus's Virtual Reanimator, which transfers its consciousness into an artificial body. While Decay's body is merely an artificial effigy, the demon's spirit possesses the copy of her former self as her own. However, Wonder Woman destroys Decay's body before she can secure the power source needed to maintain her form.

=== Decay (Sarah) ===
In September 2011, The New 52 rebooted DC's continuity. In the new timeline, a third villain named Decay is introduced as a young girl named Sarah who is captured by the organization H.I.V.E.. They test individuals with psychic potential to turn those who display metahuman powers into warriors for H.I.V.E. and those who do not into "drones", mindless sources of power for H.I.V.E. to use. Decay appears as a manifestation of Sarah's powers and, under the influence of Doctor Psycho, they escape and destroy the H.I.V.E. facility.

Sarah is later shown living on the streets of New York City, where she encounters Doctor Psycho. Decay suddenly appears and attacks, forcing Psycho to retreat. After learning that Decay is a manifestation of Sarah's powers, Superboy briefly cuts the blood flow to Sarah's brain, knocking her out. Psycho places Sarah in a comatose state, in which she experiences a dream world where she is with her family living a normal life. According to Psycho, as long as Sarah feels safe, Decay should no longer pose a threat.

=== Howard Pendergast ===
Following The New 52 reboot, Pendergast is reintroduced in Supergirl (2025), where he is transformed into Decay by a substance that Lesla-Lar smuggled out of Kandor.

== Powers and abilities ==
In his monstrous form as the first Decay, Howard Pendergast possessed the ability to melt and consume matter. The second Decay was a skilled fighter possessing the powers of flight and invulnerability. Her touch can cause any living thing she comes in contact with to rapidly age, eventually resulting in death. Decay's breath is equally deadly, and can crumble a target to dust. The third Decay was a manifestation of Sarah's dormant psychic powers. It appeared as a hulking humanoid shape that was completely black and featureless, save for a skull-like head and bony claws. It could see and attack Doctor Psycho's astral form and displayed the ability to cause a person to rot and decay rapidly until death by touching them.
