= Mala (Amazon) =

- Mala as depicted in Wonder Woman vol. 2 #92 (December 1994). Art by Mike Deodato.

Publication information
- Publisher: DC Comics
- First appearance: All-Star Comics #8 (December 1941-January 1942)
- Created by: Charles Moulton, Harry G. Peter

In-story information
- Team affiliations: Amazon nation
- Abilities: Themyscirian level super-strength, super-speed, and Amazon training

Mala is the name of two fictional characters in DC Comics, both associated with the Amazons and the Wonder Woman mythos. The first Mala, introduced in the Golden Age, is a Themyscirian Amazon and close ally of Wonder Woman, known for her role in Amazonian contests and managing Reform Island. The second Mala, from the Bana-Mighdall tribe, serves as a historian and guardian of her people's heritage. Mala has appeared in various media adaptations, including the 1975 Wonder Woman TV series, the animated film Justice League: The New Frontier, and the video game DC Universe Online.

== Fictional character biography ==
=== Golden/Silver age ===
Mala was one of the most important Amazons in the Golden Age adventures of Wonder Woman. Mala was with Diana when they discovered Steve Trevor floating in the sea, and they worked together to bring him to shore. Mala was also the last Amazon standing alongside a masked Diana during the contest to determine who would venture into Man's World as the Amazon champion.

Mala became the head of the Reform Island program for rehabilitating criminals and the criminally insane. She was typically depicted as blonde and wearing a polka dotted dress.

Mala possessed her own plane, the Swan Plane, which was superfast though not as fast as Wonder Woman's invisible plane nor telepathically controlled. Mala was also one of the few Amazons to venture into Man's World, though by accident, when her plane was hijacked by Mimi Mendez.

Mala was skilled enough in the Amazons' advanced science to be trusted by Wonder Woman to work alongside Paula to perfect a device Wonder Woman created to install telepathic controls in the invisible plane.

Mala was largely forgotten in the Silver Age, although she reappeared in several dream sequences exploring what-if scenarios. In one, Diana was forced to assume the throne of Paradise Island immediately prior to the Contest, and Mala won to become Wonder Woman.

=== Modern age ===
Due to the 1985 Crisis on Infinite Earths storyline, the previously established history of almost all DC Comics characters ceased to exist and was restarted. In Mala's case, she was re-introduced in 1992 as part of an illusion spell the White Magician cast on Wonder Woman. In the illusion Diana imagined herself on Themyscira where Mala and several other Amazons were debasing themselves before male visitors to the island. The real Mala was officially introduced later as a close friend of Diana's. It was revealed that Mala participated in the original Contest to become Wonder Woman (losing to Diana) as well as in the second Contest (which was lost to Artemis).

=== Mala of Bana-Mighdall ===
Mala of Bana-Mighdall Art by Mike Deodato.

Another Amazon named Mala was introduced as a member of the Bana-Mighdall tribe. Though Amazon born, her tribe was not blessed with immortality. Because of this she was born sometime in the early to mid-twentieth century and lived the general life-span of a common mortal. Within her tribe she is a historian and is sometimes referred to as "The Keeper" as she is also responsible for watching over a bust statue of her tribe's first queen, Antiope. Mala was already an old woman when the witch Circe granted her tribe immortality, but Mala's eyesight was greatly diminished after a battle with a demon who spit fire into her face. It was Mala who informed Wonder Woman that she looks identical to the long dead Antiope, Wonder Woman's aunt. As her tribe's historian Mala was shown standing with her people as they requested permission from Queen Hippolyta to participate in the Contest to choose a new Wonder Woman. At Diana's request she allowed the bust statue to be temporarily moved from the Bana-Mighdallian tabernacle to the Themyscirian royal throne room. Whether she was aware that the bust was moved yet again to a wooded clearing on Themyscira is unknown but likely. Mala's present status, as well as that of the bust, is unknown.

=== DC Rebirth ===
After the events of DC Rebirth, Mala was not initially seen among the Amazons on Themyscira. However, Diana later mentioned Mala to the former criminal Mayfly, telling her stories of when they would play games on Themyscira.

== Other versions ==
=== Wonder Woman: Earth One ===
Mala appears in Wonder Woman: Earth One in a similar manner to her original counterpart, though this time presented as Princess Diana's lover and the Wonder Woman before her.

=== Injustice: Gods Among Us ===
Mala appears in the comic series based on the Injustice 2 video game.

== Abilities ==
=== Mala of Themyscira ===
Mala has 3,000 years of combat experience providing her expertise in both hand-to-hand combat as well as with hand held weapons. As a Themyscirian Amazon she also possesses immortality that allows her to live indefinitely in a youthful form, but does leave her open to potential injury and death depending on her actions. Mala, as a Themyscirian, also possesses enhanced strength and intelligence. As shown by fellow members of her tribe, she has the capability to break apart steel and concrete with her bare hands, jump over 12 feet from a standing position, has a high durability factor, enhanced healing, and the ability to absorb and process a vast amount of knowledge in a short period of time.

Mala, like all Themyscirian Amazons, possesses the ability to relieve her body of physical injury and toxins by becoming one with the Earth's soil and then reforming her body whole again. During writer John Byrne's time on the comic it was stated that this is a very sacred ritual to the Themyscirians, only to be used in the most dire of circumstances.

=== Mala of Bana-Mighdall ===
As with other members of her tribe, Mala has average to above average human level strength, stamina and reflexes. As she was able to survive battling the likes of demons, Mala's durability level is higher than average for someone her age. Despite being an old woman, Mala has ageless immortality that allows her to remain the same age for all time, but leaves her open to possibly dying as it does not provide invulnerability. As a Bana, Mala would be trained in hand-to-hand battle as well as the use and manufacturing of weapons.

== In other media ==
=== Television ===
- A character based on Mala, Magda, appears in the Wonder Woman (1975) two-part episode "The Feminum Mystique", portrayed by Pamela Susan Shoop.

=== Film ===
- Mala appears in Justice League: The New Frontier, voiced by Vanessa Marshall.

=== Video games ===
- Mala appears in DC Universe Online.

=== Novels ===
- Mala appears in the Wonder Woman (2009) tie-in novel, written by S. D. Perry and Britta Dennison.

== See also ==
- List of Wonder Woman supporting characters
- The Contest (DC Comics)
