= Medusa (DC Comics) =

DC Comics character

- Medusa in Nubia & the Amazons #5 (April 2022); art by Alitha Martinez

Publication information
- Publisher: DC Comics
- First appearance: Wonder Woman #153 (August 1964)
- Created by: Robert Kanigher and Ross Andru

In-story information
- Species: Gorgon
- Partnerships: Euryale, Stheno
- Notable aliases: Medousa
- Abilities: Petrification; Acidic venom Flight; Expert combatant Divine empowerment Genesistic blood Transformative tears

Medusa (also sometimes Medousa) is a fictional character appearing in DC Comics publications and related media, commonly as a recurring adversary of the superhero Wonder Woman. Based upon the eponymous Greek mythological figure whose story was chronicled in Ovid's Metamorphoses, she is a snake-haired Gorgon with the ability to turn living creatures to stone with her gaze. Since her debut in 1964, Medusa's physical appearance has been presented variously as DC Comics' continuities have shifted and evolved. Though she has routinely been depicted with snakes for hair, she has sometimes been shown as bipedal and sometimes with a serpentine lower body. However across continuities, she has consistently been written with the ghostly ability to possess or influence other beings after her physical body has been killed, as well as an uncanny capacity for resurrection after death. Her characterization has been that of a dangerous immortal creature who is at turns both vengeful and sympathetic.

Though she first appeared as a Wonder Woman character, Medusa would spend the next 30 years as a spectral antagonist for other DC Comics heroes, such as Supergirl, Green Lantern, Green Arrow and Black Canary, as well as Hawkman and Hawkgirl. In 1994, nine years after DC Comics rebooted its continuity in a publication event known as the Crisis on Infinite Earths, Medusa would return to her roots as a menacing figure in Wonder Woman's world, rising to become a consistent recurring foe in the hero's late-Modern Age, New 52 and Rebirth-era adventures.

Medusa has been adapted into several Wonder Woman-related animated TV and film projects, and has been portrayed by Shannon Farnon, Laraine Newman and Cree Summer. In 2011, she was featured as the villain in an international animated advertising campaign by MAC Cosmetics to promote a Wonder Woman-themed makeup collection.

Though similar in appearance, Medusa is a separate character from Myrna/Myrra Rhodes (aka Dr. Medusa), a member of the Creature Commandos, a team of DC Comics anti-heroes loosely inspired by classic 20th-century movie monsters.

== Publication history ==
=== Silver and Bronze Age of Comic Books ===
The Silver Age Medusa in Wonder Woman #153 (August 1964); art by Ross Andru.

Medusa first appeared during the Silver Age, in 1964's Wonder Woman #153, written by Robert Kanigher and illustrated by Ross Andru. Kanigher reformulated the traditional Greek myth, replacing Medusa's original victimizers Poseidon and Athena with Wonder Woman's longtime enemy, the Duke of Deception. In the story, Medusa is shown to have been hailed as the most beautiful of all mortals. However, she is reviled by the Duke of Deception, who uses Martian technology to mar her beauty and transform her into a snake-haired monster. Her lover, a young prince, breaks off their engagement at the sight of her. Furious, Medusa turns the prince to stone with her gaze, subsequently roaming through Greece to take out her rage.

After her transformation, Medusa comes to lead an all-female community of harpies and giant Amazons. An unnamed wizard banishes her disembodied consciousness, along with her followers, to a nether-dimension beyond time and space, and her physical form is subsequently slain by the adventurer Perseus. Her lifeless body, now separated from her consciousness, is then mummified and entombed in an underground Grecian catacomb. Also contained in the catacomb is a magical stone statue of Medusa's likeness, which can apparently serve as a temporary earthly conduit for her disembodied consciousness (albeit an immobile one). The catacomb is breached at least twice, once by aliens from the planet Kromal (who harvest a portion of the remains of Medusa's head to create a weapon in the form of a skull-cap), and once by an archeological expedition led by Professor Martin, a friend of Carter and Shiera Hall, the superheroes Hawkman and Hawkgirl. In 1964's Superman's Girl Friend, Lois Lane #52, a Kromalian assassin named Illena tries to use the skull-cap in a plot to murder Superman for the Superman Revenge Squad. She is defeated by Superman, Lois Lane and Lana Lang. Then in 1968's Hawkman (volume 1) #25, Professor Martin, unaware that the stone statue he recovered can serve as a channel for Medusa's disembodied consciousness, removes it from the catacomb and exhibits it in the Midway City Museum, which Hawkgirl co-curates as Shiera Hall. Medusa transfers her consciousness from the immobile statue into the nearby Hawkgirl, possessing her body. She wreaks havoc across Midway City before being exorcised when Hawkman destroys the statue.

The early-Bronze Age Medusa in Green Lantern #82 (February 1971); art by Neal Adams.

Medusa is next seen in a Bronze Age adventure in 1971's Green Lantern #82, which finds the Green Lantern Hal Jordan transported to the Gorgon's prison dimension by the sister of his arch-enemy Sinestro. After fighting squadrons of Medusa's harpies and Amazons (who have been temporarily loosed onto the mortal plane), Jordan's comrades Black Canary and Green Arrow are able to deduce his extra-dimensional location. As Medusa is about to turn Jordan to stone, she is stopped by Black Canary, who has traveled to the nether-dimension to retrieve her friend. Black Canary convinces Medusa to spare Jordan before escaping with him back to the mortal plane.

Medusa next appears in 1973's Supergirl #8, written by Cary Bates and illustrated by Art Saaf. Still trapped in the nether-dimension and no longer able to use the stone statue as a vessel, Medusa's consciousness finds a way to re-inhabit her corpse, still mummified in the Grecian catacomb. In a very weakened state and barely able to move in her crypt, the Gorgon casts a spell intended to precipitate the death of Supergirl, into whose body she intends to transfer her consciousness. Though Medusa comes close to escaping the nether-dimension and once again possessing a powerful corporeal form, she is stopped by the combined efforts of Supergirl and Perseus, who together destroy the catacomb, and presumably Medusa's body with it.

=== Modern Age of Comic Books ===
The late-Modern Age Medusa in Wonder Woman (vol. 2) #208 (September 2004); art by Drew Johnson.

The blonde-haired Medusa was one of the three Gorgons, beautiful daughters of the sea with golden wings and golden claws. Many considered Medusa to be the most beautiful, as she was mortal, unlike her sisters Euryale and Stheno. She eventually met the gaze of Poseidon. Athena took notice of this, and cursed Medusa, transforming her hair into snakes and giving her a deadly gaze that turns any who look into her eyes to stone. The hero Perseus was given the task of slaying Medusa and taking her head. After using her severed head for his own use, Perseus threw it into the sea as he believed it too dangerous to keep. At some point before Medusa's death, she mated with the cyclops Polyphemus and gave birth to the serpentine giant Cyclon.

The god of fear, Phobos, later used the heart of Medusa to create the demonic Decay, who battled Wonder Woman on numerous occasions.

During the second contest to become Wonder Woman, Diana of Themyscira encountered a serpent-bodied gorgon she believed to be Medusa. This gorgon turned several amazons to stone before being thrown off a cliff by Princess Diana.

Much later, Euryale and Stheno wished to resurrected their sister, and coerced the witch Circe to aid them with Poseidon's help. Circe performed the ritual, and Medusa was successfully brought back to life. She vowed to get her revenge on Athena by killing Wonder Woman. Circe then equipped Medusa with a magical artifact which enabled her a one-time round-trip to battle Wonder Woman. When she arrived to New York, Medusa became overwhelmed with the modern world and fled back to the gorgons' lair. Circe then pointed Medusa and her sisters to the businesswoman Veronica Cale to help figure out Wonder Woman's weakness.

Medusa then attacked a celebration dinner at the White House, turning several civilians to stone and battling Wonder Woman. Though both combatants were evenly matched, Medusa fled to attack Wonder Woman's embassy. Wonder Woman chased the Gorgon back to the embassy and continued battling, resulting in the death of one of Diana's aides' sons, Martin, as he looked into Medusa's eyes. Enraged, Diana beat Medusa to near death. Medusa called out to Ares, and he ended the fight, teleporting Medusa to safety in preparation for her challenge against Wonder Woman.

While preparing for the challenge, Medusa's sisters and Circe planned to broadcast Medusa's face on camera, which would end up transforming any viewers into stone. At Yankee Stadium, Wonder Woman confronted Medusa. After a lengthy battle, Wonder Woman blinded herself with the venom of Medusa's snakes, and continued to battle the gorgon blind. One swift motion of her ax ended Medusa's life, killing her. Minutes later, Pegasus was born from Medusa's blood. Ares grabbed Medusa's head and promised to return it to Athena.

Wonder Woman later used Medusa's head to kill the hundred-armed Briareos, who had been serving as Zeus's champion.

When Wonder Woman, Wonder Girl, and the Minotaur Ferdinand were sent by Athena to the Underworld to rescue Hermes, Medusa's spirit ambushed Wonder Woman. The battle was interrupted when Ares appeared and teleported Medusa away so that he could speak to the amazon.

During Odyssey, The Morrigan came into ownership of Medusa's head. Two unsuspecting men working for the Morrigan were turned to stone by looking at the head. When Anann and Bellona found the statues, Anann decided to use Medusa's tears to transform the pair into Cernunnos and Minotaur.

=== The New 52 ===
The New 52 Medusa in Batwoman (vol. 2) #14 (November 2012); art by J.H. Williams III.

In the New 52 reboot of DC's continuity, Medusa is first thought to be a criminal organization consisting of urban legend-themed supervillains, many of which have battled Batwoman. It is eventually revealed that Medusa is the Queen of Monsters, and was formerly imprisoned on Paradise Island. Eventually, Batwoman uses a shard of Bloody Mary's destroyed body to force Medusa to look at her own reflection. Medusa is petrified and shattered by Batwoman.

== Powers and abilities ==
Medusa has the ability to transform any living creature into stone if they look into her eyes. In her Post-Crisis depiction, Medusa has been seen with either a serpentine body and a humanoid body with golden wings. This iteration's follicle coils could spit burning toxins which sear and poison on contact and was blessed by the gods with physicality rivaling that of Wonder Woman. An unknown facet, either thanks to blessings from the almighty or Circe's spell craft, gave Medusa's voice a hypnotic chime with which she could compel others to turn towards her gaze.

== Other versions ==
=== Sensation Comics Featuring Wonder Woman ===
In the story "The Problem With Cats" from the anthology series Sensation Comics Featuring Wonder Woman, Medusa teams up with Cheetah and Circe to battle Wonder Woman after capturing Batman and Superman. It is eventually revealed to be a little girl playing with her dolls, one of which she pretends is Medusa.

=== Wonder Woman: Earth One ===
Medusa appeared as an enemy of Wonder Woman in the graphic novel Wonder Woman: Earth One. Out of jealousy, Queen Hippolyta and her fellow amazon Nubia travel to the Underworld to free Medusa and allow her to turn several humans in Man's World to stone, including Steve Trevor. Medusa then left, presumably returning to the Underworld. Later, during Diana's trial, Diana uses the purple healing ray to restore Steve Trevor and the other victims of Medusa's gaze.

== In other media ==
=== Television ===
Medusa as she appears in Challenge of the Superfriends.

- Medusa appears in the Challenge of the Superfriends episode "Battle of the Gods", voiced by Shannon Farnon. Zeus summons her and other mythical creatures to battle the Super Friends in a contest to determine if they are worthy of Aphrodite's favor. Medusa tries to attack Wonder Woman, but accidentally sees her reflection in Wonder Woman's bracelet and petrifies herself.
- Medusa appears in the Justice League Unlimited episode "This Little Piggy", voiced by Laraine Newman. This version is a prisoner of Tartarus and former cellmate of Circe. After she helps Batman and Zatanna locate Circe, Themis reduces Medusa's sentence.

=== Film ===
Medusa appears in Wonder Woman: Bloodlines, voiced by Cree Summer. She is resurrected by Villainy Inc. through a combination of cybernetics and genetics in the hopes that they can weaponize her for their plot to invade Themyscira and steal their technology. However, Medusa betrays them, destroying Doctor Cyber and killing Doctor Poison before going on a rampage until she is killed by Wonder Woman and Silver Swan.

=== Video games ===
- Medusa appears as a character summon in Scribblenauts Unmasked: A DC Comics Adventure.
- Medusa appears in DC Universe Online as part of the "Amazon Fury" DLC.

=== Miscellaneous ===
- Medusa appears in promotional videos created by MAC Cosmetics and illustrated by comic book artist Mike Allred to promote a short-lived Wonder Woman-themed make-up line from 2011-2012.
- Medusa appears in Scribblenauts Unmasked: A Crisis of Imagination #5.
