= Wonder Woman '77 =

2015–2016 comic book series published by DC Comics

Publication information
- Publisher: DC Comics
- Schedule: Monthly
- Publication date: January 2015 – September 2016
- No. of issues: 4
- Main character: Wonder Woman

Creative team
- Written by: Marc Andreyko (#1–4); Trina Robbins (#3–4); Amanda Deibert (#3–4); Ruth Fletcher (#3); Christos Gage (#3); Amy Chu (#4)
- Artist(s): Nicola Scott (cover); Various (interior)

Wonder Woman '77 is a comic book series published by DC Comics featuring Wonder Woman as a continuation of the 1975–1979 television series starring Lynda Carter. The series was initially written by Marc Andreyko, though other writers later substituted in, with cover art by Nicola Scott. It was followed by Batman '66 Meets Wonder Woman '77 and Wonder Woman '77 Meets the Bionic Woman.

== Publication history ==
After the success of the Batman '66 comic book series, DC Comics began publishing a similar comic book series based on Wonder Woman's TV series in 2015. Writer Marc Andreyko specifically set out to use villains from Wonder Woman's "under-appreciated" rogues gallery in Wonder Woman '77, as the television series' limited budget did not allow for many of them. This meant the comic series was able to use villains such as the Cheetah, the Silver Swan, and Doctor Psycho, while also incorporating villains from the television series and brand-new villains.

== Collected editions ==
Trade paperbacks
Title	Material collected	Publication date	ISBN
Wonder Woman '77 Vol. 1	Wonder Woman '77 Special #1–2	June 7, 2016	978-1401263287
Wonder Woman '77 Vol. 2	Wonder Woman '77 Special #3-4	February 21, 2017	978-1401267889
Batman '66 Meets Wonder Woman '77	Batman '66 Meets Wonder Woman '77 #1-6	October 3, 2017	978-1401273859
Wonder Woman '77 Meets the Bionic Woman	Wonder Woman '77 Meets the Bionic Woman #1-6	November 7, 2017	978-1524103729

== See also ==
- Batman '66
- Superman '78
- Batman '89
