= Amazons (DC Comics) =

Race of warrior women in DC Comics

- Amazonian warriors as depicted in Wonder Woman Secret Files and Origins #1 (March 1998). Art by Dick Giordano (penciller) and Sal Buscema (inker).

Publication information
- Publisher: DC Comics
- First appearance: All Star Comics #8 (October 1942)
- Created by: William Moulton Marston; Harry G. Peter

Characteristics
- Place of origin: Themyscira
- Notable members: Wonder Woman; Hippolyta; Antiope; Artemis of Bana-Mighdall; Donna Troy; Menalippe; Nubia; Philippus
- Inherent abilities: Superhuman strength, superhuman speed, superhuman durability, stamina, agility, enhanced senses, heightened intelligence, immortality; Superior hand-to-hand and martial arts skills

The Amazons of DC Comics are a race of warrior women who exist as part of Greek mythology. Created by writer William Moulton Marston and artist Harry G. Peter, and inspired by the mythological Amazons, they were introduced in All Star Comics #8 (October 1942). The Amazons live on Paradise Island, later known as Themyscira, an isolated location in the middle of the ocean where they are hidden from "Man's World" (the rest of the world).

Depending on the origin story, the Amazons are the creation of Aphrodite or were created from clay by a coterie of Olympian gods over three thousand years ago to serve as messengers of peace and justice. For centuries, the women thrived in safety and security apart from a hostile, male-dominated world. As long as Amazons remain on Themyscira, they do not age. Circumstances involving the unexpected arrival of Steve Trevor forced their existence to be revealed to the modern world.

There have been numerous incarnations of the Amazons after Marston's original depiction: Robert Kanigher's revised depiction (highlighted by the change of Queen Hippolyta's hair from brunette to blonde), George Pérez's reworking following the Crisis, and changes subsequent to Infinite Crisis and The New 52. What these groups have in common is their association with the superheroine Wonder Woman, who is traditionally portrayed as the "princess" of the Amazons.

== Fictional history ==
"We are a nation of women, dedicated to our sisters, to our gods, and to the peace that is humankind's right. Granted life by Gaea, the goddesses, and the souls of women past, we have been gifted with the mission to unite the people of our world with love and compassion. We are the Amazons, and we have come to save mankind".

— Code of the Amazons: Secret Files and Origins

The Amazons of Paradise Island were first created by William Moulton Marston as allegories of his love leaders and as part of the origin story of his creation, Wonder Woman, who is also an allegory for the ideal love leader. These Amazons were a race of immortal super-women that lived on the magical Paradise Island. Granted life by Aphrodite, the Goddess of Love, the Amazons thrived in peace for centuries, but remained aloof from the world of Man. The youngest, strongest, and most human of the Amazons, Princess Diana, left her protective nation of sisterhood, renouncing her immortality to fight the forces of evil in Man's World as Wonder Woman.

Marston depicted the origin story of the Amazons as women sculpted and brought to life by Aphrodite, who had been tricked and captured by Hercules and his men. Aphrodite, angry that they had been tricked, left them imprisoned but finally relented and helped them escape. They then moved to their own women-only island, where, in the absence of male aggression, they developed a superior, war-free culture. The unbound cuffs ("Bracelets of Submission") were still worn to remind them that to give up their independence or to allow any man power over them will sap them of their own power. Marston used bondage as a symbol concept. As a psychologist, Marston was heavily influenced by his polyamorous relationship with two women, one being the niece of Margaret Sanger, a renowned outspoken feminist.

=== Pre-Crisis ===
In the days of Ancient Greece, many centuries ago, the Amazons were the foremost nation in the world. In Amazonia, women ruled and all was well. One day, Hercules, the strongest man in the world, stung by the taunts that he could not conquer the Amazon women, selected his strongest and fiercest warriors and landed on the Amazons' shores.

The Amazons' queen, Hippolyta, met Hercules in personal combat, because she knew that with her magic girdle, given to her by Aphrodite, the goddess of love, she could not lose.

Hippolyte defeated Hercules, but Hercules, with deceit and trickery, managed to secure Hippolyte's magic girdle—and soon the Amazons were taken into slavery. Aphrodite, angry at Hippolyte for having succumbed to the wiles of men, would do nothing to help them.

Finally, the Amazons were no longer able to bear their submission to men, and Hippolyte appealed to the Goddess Aphrodite again. This time not in vain, for she relented, and with her help, Hippolyte secured the magic girdle from Hercules.

With the magic girdle in Hippolyte's possession, it did not take long for the Amazons to overcome their masters and taking from them their entire fleet, they set sail for another shore, for it was Aphrodite's condition that they leave the world of man and establish a new world of their own. Aphrodite also decreed that they must always wear the heavy bracelets fashioned by their captors, as a reminder that they must always keep aloof from men.

==== Paradise Island ====
After a sea voyage, the Amazons settled on Paradise Island. The island is depicted as having fertile volcanic soil, diverse plant and animal life, and abundant natural resources, supporting a society without deprivation, illness, hatred, or war. The Amazons would retain their eternal youth provided that they remained on the island with access to the Fountain of Eternal Youth, Hippolyte retained the magic girdle, and they did not submit to men.

==== The Magic Sphere ====
Just after the Amazons conquered the Herculeans and set sail for their island, they were given the Magic Sphere by Athena, Goddess of War. Through this device, Hippolyte was able to view events in Man's World from the present and past—and sometimes even forecast the future. With the visions of the future seen from the Magic Sphere, the Amazons were able to far surpass the inventions of man-made civilization. Not only were the Amazons stronger and wiser, but their weapons were more advanced, and their flying machines were faster.

=== Post-Crisis ===
In the mid-1980s a storyline took place called Crisis on Infinite Earths in which all comics in the DC Universe ceased to exist and restarted with all new origins. When this happened it was explained that the Amazons were created by the goddess Artemis from the souls of women who had died at the hands of men, and were given new and stronger bodies, made from clay transformed into flesh and blood. These Amazons, like the Pre-Crisis versions, escaped Heracles (the Greek name for Hercules) and his men to an isolated and magically protected island, this one called Themyscira after the lost capital city of the Amazons' former homeland. In this new land, they were granted superhuman strength, speed, durability, agility, superhuman senses, enhanced intellect, immortality, and beauty. Some Amazons chose to remain behind, however, and, lacking immortality, formed the hidden nation of Bana-Mighdall. Stories featuring the Amazons appeared in Bonus Book inserts in Wonder Woman (vol. 2) #18 (July 1988) and #26 (January 1989).

==== Infinite Crisis ====
Due to the perceived failure of Wonder Woman's mission in Man's World, Themyscira and the Amazons are removed from the Earth realm by the Athenian Gods.

==== Amazons Attack ====
The returned Amazons, led by a resurrected Hippolyta, invade Washington D.C. In the end they are stripped of their memories and scattered throughout the Earth in mortal identities.

==== Flashpoint ====
In the reality-changing Flashpoint event, the Amazons are at war with the Atlanteans in western Europe, after Hippolyta was killed by an Amazon disguised as an Atlantean during a wedding between Diana and Aquaman, causing Diana to become the Queen. They have taken over Britain, killing 12 million in the process. Many female superbeings are shown to be in league with them. It is later revealed that the Ocean Master and Diana's aunt were behind this incident.

=== The New 52 ===
In September 2011, The New 52 rebooted DC's continuity. In this timeline, the history of the Amazons was likewise revised. Here they once again lived on Paradise Island as a race of supernaturally strong women who periodically mated with outsiders. Girls were celebrated while the boys were taken from their mothers. Feeling sympathy for the boys and recognizing their potential, Hephaestus took them in.

In this continuity, Wonder Woman is the daughter of Hippolyta and Zeus, with the former claiming that she was created from clay to protect her from Hera.

=== DC Rebirth ===
With DC Rebirth, writers went back to the post-Crisis origins for the Amazons, largely due to the controversial depiction of their mating cycle. It is once again stated that the Amazons are immortal, and that they were conceived from the souls of women who had died at the hands of men.

=== Wonder Woman Historia: The Amazons ===
Inspired by George Pérez's reworking, Kelly Sue DeConnick wrote Wonder Woman Historia: the Amazons. The three issue-limited series was published in celebration of the 80th anniversary of Wonder Woman and illustrated by Phil Jimenez, Gene Ha, and Nicola Scott.

Wonder Woman Historia: the Amazons begins with seven Greek goddesses-Hestia, Artemis, Demeter, Hecate, Aphrodite, Athena, and Hera-demanding that all mortal men be punished for abusing women, only for their request to be turned down by the womanizing Zeus. Despite the Amazons being her own idea, Hera does not join the other goddesses as they regroup at the Well of Souls (called the Well of the Lost in this retelling), each of them creating a quintet of female warriors from murdered women's souls. Composed of six tribes each with its own queen and patron goddess, the thirty Amazons travel the ancient world to rescue women from male traffickers whom they kill in acts of vigilantism; however, the Amazons only go on their missions at night when Artemis can watch over them, and hide themselves during the day to keep their existence a secret from the male gods, especially Zeus. In this version, Hippolyta starts out as a midwife's widowed assistant rather than a founding Amazon member. After being ordered to abandon an unwanted newborn girl, Hippolyta changes her mind, racing against the elements to save the baby and encounters the Amazons when they rescue her from traffickers.

As Hera turns the abandoned baby's soul into a bird to spy on the Amazons, Hippolyta makes a deal with Artemis to become one of them. Hippolyta then becomes a queen of her own Amazon tribe, which is made up of the women the female warriors rescue and bring back to their secret hideout to train in their way of life and have all six creator goddesses as their patrons. But one day when the sun is up, one young Amazon kills a murdered trafficker's son praying to Apollo, exposing the female warriors' existence to the male gods, who then send an all-male army to annihilate the Amazons.

As the Amazons battle against the gods and their soldiers, Hippolyta leads them all as their sole queen. But when the Amazons suffer many losses, Hippolyta travels to Olympus and makes a bargain with Zeus: her sisters' lives in exchange for their freedom. Except for the one who had killed the boy in Apollo's temple, all the Amazons, dead and living, are given long lives yet are forever imprisoned on Themyscira, where are they allowed to do as they please while under the sun god's watch; once a month, Artemis is allowed temporary guardianship of the warriors she had helped create. Grieving over depriving her sisters their freedom, Hippolyta makes a clay baby girl, whom the seven goddesses bless with gifts and reincarnate from the soul of the very child the Queen of the Amazons was ordered to abandon. Named after the moon goddess, Diana will grow up to become Wonder Woman and continue her mother and their sister Amazons' fight for women's justice.

== Society ==
The fiercest and wisest among the Amazons holds the prestigious title "Wonder Woman – the definition of a heroic champion and ambassador-at-large. Queen Hippolyta was the previous "Wonder Woman" when she freed her people from slavery and led them to "paradise". Princess Diana is the most recent and youngest Amazon to hold the title.

=== Culture ===
As shown in the comic, the Amazons hold several customs and observances. Some include:

==== Courting ritual ====
When an Amazon wishes to court another, she presents an offering of a coconut. Inside the coconut is a nectarine seed strung onto a necklace and a bracelet made of thorns. The nectarine seed signifies a bounty, hoped for but not yet achieved. The thorn bracelet is partially wrapped in blue, red and gold ribbons. The blue represents hope, the red represents danger, and the gold represents a request to the goddess Athena to provide her blessing. The pursuer then takes out the necklace and says "That thou art full of promise", blesses it with a kiss, and places the necklace around her intended lover's neck. She then takes out the bracelet and says "That thou shall know the heart of another" and places the bracelet on her intended lover's wrist. If the person gifted chooses to accept the courtship, she then agrees to always wear the necklace and bracelet and never remove them until it can be mutually agreed upon to form a lasting relationship together. Until the two Amazons agree to finalize their relationship, the couple puts each other through a series of physical, mental and emotional tests to see if the intended relationship can withstand life's trials.

==== Marriage ====
In 2015, Sensation Comics featured Wonder Woman officiating a same-sex wedding (#48) drawn by Australian illustrator Jason Badower. Inspired by the June Supreme Court ruling that established marriage equality in all 50 United States, Badower says DC Comics was "fantastic" about his idea for the issue. The Amazon people are not to be labelled sexually; Wonder Woman said that "...my country is all women. To us, it's not 'gay' marriage. It's just marriage"; being a society that was only populated by women, "lesbian" in [the world's] eyes may have been "straight" for them. She further added that "no Amazon is going to look at another Amazon and say they are "Amazoning wrong". Because that wouldn't be paradise. The society accepts everyone in it. The requirement is, you're here and you're female [...] Nobody says a dress is inappropriate. Nobody says, 'Why are you wearing pants?' Nobody says you're too heavy. Nobody says you're too skinny, or not strong enough".

==== Feast of the Five ====
One of the most revered observances the Themyscirian Amazons hold dear is called The Feast of the Five. On this day the Amazons pay homage to the five original goddesses who took part in their creation. Aside from constant prayer and worship, the occasion begins with a hunt in honour to the goddess Artemis. A harvest is also celebrated in honor of the goddess Demeter. A feast is then held in honor of the remaining goddesses. This is said to be the Themyscirians' most holy holiday. The Feast of the Five can be seen almost as a holy birthday for each of the Themyscirian Amazons, with the glory of the occasion being placed in honor to their creators.

==== Hiketeia ====
The Amazons observe an ancient Greek custom called Hiketeia, in which one person supplicates themselves to another in exchange for sustenance and protection. The supplication does not have to be accepted once offered, but when it is accepted both parties agree to take the contract very seriously. Should either the guardian or supplicant ever falter in their duties, the Erinyes, ancient and savage judgement bringers, will slaughter them instantly. When Hiketeia is offered, the supplicant says the following words to their intended guardian: "(Name of potential guardian), I am (name of potential servant). I offer myself in supplication to you. I come without protection. I come without means, without honor, without hope, with nothing but myself to beg for your protection. In your shadow I will serve, by your breath will I breathe, by your words will I speak, by your mercy will I live. With all my heart, with everything I can offer, I beg you, in Zeus' name, who watches over all supplicants, accept my plea".

==== Send Forth ====
When a female child is lost at sea, the child is rescued from drowning by the goddess Thetis. Thetis would rescue mortal female children she deemed "special" and safely transport them to the shores of Themyscira's Island of Healing (male children were taken someplace else). Once on the island the Amazons' chief physician Epione would discover them and tend to their care. After this the child would be taken to the royal palace where one Amazon is selected as the child's "Guardian of Inspiration". The baby is then granted great wisdom and strength of spirit via a magical kiss. According to the Amazon Pythia, Julia Kapatelis was the last of hundreds of babies to experience this in 1937. This "blessing" in actuality is a subliminal suggestion for the child to teach peace and equality throughout their lives. This blessing can extend to descendants as well. This custom is called "Send Forth". Once this is done the child is considered an Amazon and spiritual daughter to the Amazon who blessed them. After a few days of recuperation and blessings, the child is taken to the island shores again, where she is taken back into the ocean and returned, again by Thetis who magically travels back in time to return the child to the exact point in time when the child first left her homeland.

==== Union with the Earth ====
All Themyscirian Amazons possess the ability to relieve their bodies of injury by becoming one with the Earth's soil and then reforming their bodies whole again. The first time Diana does this she prays to her god Gaea (this being a very sacred ritual and only used in the most dire circumstances) saying: "Gaea, I pray to you. Grant me your strength. You are the Earth who suckled me, who nurtured and bred me. Through you all life is renewed. The circle which never ends. I pray you, mother Gaea, take me into your bosom. Please, let me be worthy".

==== The Victor's Circle ====
Created by Antiope in 1041 BCE, the Victor's Circle is a secret, quasi-official fighting organization where Amazons compete in unarmed combat (implied to be a form of pankration), either as a way to resolve disputes or simply to "[blow] off some extra steam". Fights are conducted in a cavern hidden behind a waterfall, within a small circular arena with semicircular seating both hewn out of the rock. Within the ring, all ranks and titles are considered irrelevant, and combatants fight as equals. At any given session, an Amazon may fight multiple times, such as a winner of a bout issuing a challenge to or being challenged by an audience member. A number of notable Amazons hold records in the Victor's Circle, such as Diana holding the record for most submissions, Nubia holding the record for most knockouts, and Philippus the record for most fights.

==== Death ====
Originally a cavern was built under the Amazons' Temple of the Dead, which is where those dead are remembered. After an Amazon's funeral is completed, the body is lowered into the cavern where it is laid to rest in a city of the dead. Queen Hippolyta assigns the chief temple priestess to remain alone in the city to watch over the dead for a thousand years before a replacement is made.

This tradition was later changed as the Amazons discovered that the priestess often went mad in her solitude. One such priestess brought the dead to life through the use of magic during a mad outburst. The Amazons soon after burned their dead, during which the souls of the slain Amazons took form among the flames before traveling onto the plane of afterlife called the Elysian Fields.

=== Inherent abilities ===
The Amazon Pythia ripping large iron bars from a stone and mortar wall to free Julia Kapatelis from imprisonment. Art by Jill Thompson.

All Themyscirian Amazons are themselves wonder women and possess various degrees of incredible superhuman strength, speed, stamina and extraordinarily acute senses and the ability to glide on aircurrents, as seen in the second competition for the title of Wonder Woman won by Orana. All these were gifts blessed to them by their gods. As shown by various tribe members, they have the capability to break apart steel and concrete with their bare hands, jump over 1,200 feet from a standing position, have a high durability factor, enhanced healing, and the ability to absorb and process a vast amount of knowledge in a short period of time. Themyscirian Amazons also possess immortality that allows them to live indefinitely in a youthful form, but does leave them open to potential injury and death depending on their actions. They also have developed high levels of hand-to-hand combat training, mastered over 3,000 years, and are experts in the use of various hand held weapons.

Themyscirian Amazons also possess the ability to relieve their bodies of physical injury and toxins by becoming one with the Earth's soil and then reforming their bodies whole again. The first time Diana does this she prays to her god Gaea saying: "Gaea, I pray to you. Grant me your strength. You are the Earth who suckled me, who nurtured and bred me. Through you all life is renewed. The circle which never ends. I pray you, mother Gaea, take me into your bosom. Please, let me be worthy". During writer John Byrne's time on the comic it was stated that this is a very sacred ritual, to be used only in the most dire of circumstances.

=== Technology ===
The Purple Ray is a quasi-mystical healing device used by the Amazons. In the Pre-Crisis continuity, it was invented by Diana herself. It has also been used for other purposes, such as empowering Wonder Girl, and as a weapon.

== List of notable Amazons ==
=== Major Amazons ===
Member	First appearance	Description
Althea	All-Star Comics #8 (October 1941)	The royal physician on Paradise Island, Doctor Althea was present when Steve Trevor crashed onto the island. Althea was the first to notice Diana's infatuation with the American pilot, and alerted Queen Hippolyta. Post-Crisis, Althea's role as Amazon healer was filled by Epione, though Althea returned much later during DC Rebirth.
Antiope	Wonder Woman #312 (February 1984)	Hippolyta's sister and an Amazon queen, she led a tribe into Greece to seek vengeance on Heracles and Theseus after the Amazons' capture. She eventually married Theseus but was killed by his former lover Ariadne. Antiope's descendants became the Lost Tribe of Amazons.
Artemis	Wonder Woman (vol. 2) #90 (September 1994)	A member of the Egyptian tribe of Amazons of Bana-Mighdall, Artemis is a skilled warrior who briefly took up the mantle of Wonder Woman. Like Diana, Artemis has spent many years in Man's World, including a significant time with Red Hood and Bizarro.
Cassandra Sandsmark	Wonder Woman (vol. 2) #105 (January 1996)	The daughter of Helena Sandsmark and Zeus, Cassie Sandsmark is a demigoddess who became the second Wonder Girl after Donna Troy took the codename Troia.
Diana	All-Star Comics #8 (October 1941)	Known to the public as Wonder Woman, Diana is the daughter of Queen Hippolyta and princess of the Amazons of Themyscira.
Donna Troy	The Brave and the Bold #60 (July 1965)	A founding member of the Teen Titans, Donna Troy is Diana's younger sister and the first to take the mantle of Wonder Girl.
Hippolyta	All-Star Comics #8 (October 1941)	Originally known as Hippolye, Hippolyta is the queen of the Amazons of Themyscira and Diana's mother. Post-Crisis, Hippolyta used the Wonder Woman codename during World War II.
Io	Wonder Woman (vol. 2) #196 (November 2003)	A skilled blacksmith, the muscular Io became one of Diana's most trusted allies. Unbeknownst to Diana, Io was in love with the princess. She later began a relationship with Nubia.
Mala	All-Star Comics #8 (October 1941)	One of Diana's best friends on Themyscira, Mala was present when Steve Trevor crashed onto Paradise Island. She later participated in the Contest to return Steve to the United States, but was defeated by Diana in the final challenge. Mala later became the warden at Transformation Island, a rehabilitation center for female criminals.
Menalippe	Wonder Woman (vol. 2) #1 (February 1987)	An oracle and messenger for the Gods of Olympus. Menalippe was one of the casualties during the War of the Gods, though she later returned during DC Rebirth.
Nubia	Wonder Woman #204 (January 1973)	Also known as Nu'Bia, Nubia was originally Diana's black twin sister. Kidnapped by Mars as a child, Nubia was raised on Slaughter Island. She later served as guardian of Doom's Doorway. More recently, Nubia became Queen of Themyscira after Hippolyta was murdered.
Paula	Sensation Comics #4 (April 1942)	Diana's earliest archenemy, Paula von Gunther was previously a Nazi agent. However, after Diana rescued Paula's daughter Gerta, Paula reformed from her villainous ways and was eventually allowed into the Amazons' ranks by Aphrodite. Paula then used her brilliant mind to help the Amazons in their quest for peace.
Philippus	Wonder Woman (vol. 2) #1 (February 1987)	Queen Hippolyta's general and lover. Philippus briefly served as an ambassador of Themyscira, though she rarely strays from Hippolyta's side.
Yara Flor	Dark Nights: Death Metal #7 (March 2021)	A member of the Esquecida, a tribe of Amazons from the Amazon Rainforest.

=== Introduced Pre-Crisis ===
- Atalanta - queen of the lost Amazon River tribe.
- Dalma - a renegade Amazon who left Paradise Island and battled Wonder Woman.
- Drusilla - an Amazon messenger who used a special magic amulet to take Diana and I Ching to the Island when Ares was attempting to force Hippolyta to give him the secret of transdimensional travel.
- Fatsis
- Orana
- Penthesilea - first Queen of the Amazons on Earth-One.
- Sofia Constantinas

=== Introduced Post-Crisis ===
Themyscirian Amazons as represented by diversified ethnicities, art by Phil Jimenez from Wonder Woman Secret Files and Origins.

- Acantha — A senator (first appearance: Wonder Woman (vol. 2) #10).
- Aella — A warrior with a particular affinity for hawks who was killed during the Amazon civil war (first appearance: Wonder Woman #1).
- Callineira (first appearance: Wonder Woman (vol. 2) #121).
- Calyce — A carpenter (first appearance: Wonder Woman (vol. 2) Annual #1).
- Clio — A royal scribe (first appearance: Wonder Woman (vol. 2) #38).
- Consivia — An architect who is killed while defending Doom's Doorway (first appearance: Wonder Woman (vol. 2) Annual #1).
- Cydippe — The aid to Princess Diana (first appearance: Wonder Woman (vol. 2) #53).
- Egeria — A lieutenant in the Amazon army and Captain of the Guard; she died defending Doom's Doorway (first appearance: Wonder Woman (vol. 2) Annual #1).
- Epione — A chief healer (first appearance: Wonder Woman (vol. 2) #2).
- Euboea — A warrior and companion to Diana (first appearance: Wonder Woman (vol. 2) #10).
- Eudia — She helped Diana unlock the secrets of the Amazons' reversion to stone (first appearance: Wonder Woman (vol. 2) #12).
- Faruka - An eyepatch-wearing Amazon.
- Grace Choi
- Hellene — A senator and historian who was killed by Cheetah during War of the Gods (first appearance: Wonder Woman (vol. 2) #14).
- Hope Taya - A bodyguard to Lex Luthor along with Mercy Graves.
- Hypsipyle — A former queen of Lemnos, mother of Phthia, the martyr of the Lost Tribe of Amazons (first appearance: Wonder Woman (vol. 2) Annual #1).
- Iphthime — A sculptor and lover to Anaya of the Lost Tribe of Amazons (first appearance Wonder Woman (vol. 2) #27).
- Magala — A court sorceress who helped create Donna Troy. She is later killed Fury. (first appearance: Wonder Woman (vol. 2) #124).
- Melia
- Mercy Graves - A bodyguard to Lex Luthor along with Hope Taya.
- Mnemosyne — The chief historian (first appearance: Wonder Woman (vol. 2) #10).
- Myrrha — The chambermaid of the Royal Palace, she died during the Imperiex War (first appearance: Wonder Woman (vol. 2) #53).
- Nione — A priestess (first appearance: Wonder Woman (vol. 2) #38).
- Oeone - A botanist (first appearance: Wonder Woman (vol. 2) #27).
- Orithia
- Pallas — A forger who created Diana's Eagle armor (first appearance: Wonder Woman Secret Files #1).
- Penelope — A high priestess and oracle of Themyscira, former lover of Menalippe (first appearance: Wonder Woman (vol. 2) #21).
- Penthiselea — An Amazon captain and the daughter of Phthia and Melanippus, the Amazons martyr; she died in battle with Achilles (first appearance: Wonder Woman (vol. 2) #33).
- Phthia — The daughter of the Amazon queen Hypsipyle and the Argonaut Jason. After Antiope's death, Phthia became queen of Antiope's tribe of Amazons, which later became the Amazons of Bana-Mighdall.
- Polycasta
- Pythia — The spiritual mother of Julia Kapatelis (first appearance: Wonder Woman (vol. 2) Annual #1).
- Tender Mercy - An Amazonian supervillain and partner of Doctor Impossible.
- Timandra — The chief architect (first appearance: Wonder Woman (vol. 2) #38).
- Trigona — An Amazon athlete (first appearance: Wonder Woman (vol. 2) #0).
- Venelia — A warrior and competitor in the second Contest (first appearance: Wonder Woman (vol. 2) #91).

=== Introduced in the New 52 ===
- Aleka - A muscular Amazon who often picked on Diana when she was younger. She was killed during the battle with the First Born. She bears resemblance to Artemis of Bana-Mighdall.
- Daphne
- Demi
- Derinoe - An elderly Amazon who had at one point been Hippolyta's lover. She lost her youth due to an encounter with one of Hecate's minions. She later allied with Hecate to create Donna Troy to turn the Amazons against Wonder Woman. She was killed after trying to stab Diana herself.
- Dessa - A black Amazon and one of Hippolyta's most trusted friends. She bears resemblance to General Philippus.
- Exoristos - An exiled Amazon who joined the Demon Knights.
- Hessia - An Amazon who, like Diana, left Themyscira and sacrificed her immortality. She was responsible for leaking Diana's relationship with Superman to news sources.
- Myrina Black - An Amazon who helped Darkseid to father Grail.

=== Introduced in DC Rebirth ===
- Andromeda - A former lover of Nubia who was reborn as an Amazon in the Well of Souls.
- Areto - An Amazon astrologer and member of the Council of Themyscira.
- Bia - A trans woman who was reborn through the Well of Souls.
- Castalia - An oracle and member of the Council of Themyscira.
- Delphine
- Karessi
- Kasia - Diana's lover on Themyscira.
- Medusa - A longtime enemy of Wonder Woman who later reforms and becomes an honorary Amazon.
- Raina - a red-haired amazon who often wears a scarf around her hair.
- Sofia - A friend of Diana who was among the finalists in the contest to become Wonder Woman.
- Zina

== Other versions ==
=== Flashpoint ===
In the Flashpoint reality, the Amazons are shown to be at war with the Atlanteans led by Emperor Aquaman. Besides Queen Hippolyta and Princess Diana, the known Amazons are Artemis, Penthesileia, and Philippus. Following the death of Queen Hippolyta, Princess Diana and her Amazons have caused havoc in Western Europe during their war with the Atlanteans and have conquered the United Kingdom, killing 12 million people in the process. The Amazons also have a group of female warriors on their side called the Furies that are loyal to Princess Diana out of fear; the group consisted of Arrowette, Cheetah, Cheshire, Giganta, Hawkgirl, Huntress, Katana, Lady Vic, Silver Swan, Starfire, Terra, and Vixen. In addition, Enchantress is depicted as a spy working for the Amazons.

== In other media ==
=== Television ===
- The Amazons appear in the 1974 television film Wonder Woman starring Cathy Lee Crosby as Diana. Other Amazons include Queen Hippolyta (Charlene Holt) and Ahnjayla (Anitra Ford).
- The Amazons appear in the 1970s live action television series Wonder Woman, starring Lynda Carter. Among them are the Queen Mother (Cloris Leachman, Carolyn Jones and Beatrice Straight), Diana (Lynda Carter), the Amazon Doctor (Fannie Flagg), Rena, Drusilla (Debra Winger), Magda, Dalma, Asclepia (Bettey Ackerman) and Evadne.
- The Amazons appear in the Challenge of the Superfriends episode "Secret Origins of the Super Friends".
- The Amazons appear in several episodes of Justice League and Justice League Unlimited.
- The Amazons briefly appear in the Batman: The Brave and the Bold episode "Triumvirate of Terror!".
- The Amazons appear in the Justice League Action episode "Luthor in Paradise".
- The Amazons appear in the Harley Quinn episodes "Bachelorette" and "The Runaway Bridesmaid".
- The Amazons appear in the DC Super Hero Girls episode "#SweetJustice".
- A television series from DC Studios titled Paradise Lost, centered on the Amazons, will be released on Max, as part of DC Universe franchise.

=== Film ===
- The Amazons appear in the animated film Wonder Woman.
- The Amazons appear in the animated film Superman/Batman: Apocalypse.
- The Amazons appear in the animated film Justice League: The Flashpoint Paradox.
- The Amazons appear in the animated film DC Super Hero Girls: Hero of the Year.
- The Amazons appear in the animated film Wonder Woman: Bloodlines.
- The Amazons appear in films set in the DC Extended Universe:
  - They first appear in Wonder Woman. Their home of Themyscira was created by Zeus in his dying breath to be a sanctuary for the Amazons following Ares' massacre of his fellow gods.
  - The Amazons appear in Justice League and its director's cut. It is revealed that, centuries prior, the Amazons assisted the tribes of man, the Atlanteans, the Olympian Gods, and the Green Lantern Corps in fighting off an invasion (Steppenwolf's in the theatrical version, Darkseid's in the director's cut) of Earth. In the present, Steppenwolf attacks Themyscira to seize the Mother Box guarded by them.
  - The Amazons appear in Wonder Woman 1984. The film introduces an artifact called the Armor of Asteria, worn by the legendary Amazon of the same name, who bought her fellow Amazons time to evacuate to Themyscira. Wonder Woman later wears the armor when fighting Cheetah and confronting Maxwell Lord. In a mid-credits scene, it revealed that Asteria (portrayed by Lynda Carter) is still alive among the humans.
  - A Wonder Woman spin-off film focusing on the Amazons was in development by Patty Jenkins and star/producer Gal Gadot, but was later cancelled because of the current plans for the DC Universe (DCU) franchise formulated by James Gunn and Peter Safran.
- The Amazons appear in the Looney Tunes live-action/animation film Space Jam: A New Legacy. Lola Bunny is depicted as having moved with the Amazons from the DCEU.

=== Video games ===
- The Amazons appear in several cutscenes in Mortal Kombat vs. DC Universe, as well as Wonder Woman's in-game ending. In the game's storyline, they are shown defending Paradise Island after Shang Tsung invades it.
- The Amazons appear in DC Universe Online. Besides Wonder Woman, the only named Amazons in the game are Io, Mala, and Clio, with the others being generic foot soldiers in the form of Amazon Hoplite Minors, Amazon Hoplite Majors, Amazon Hoplite Spearmaidens, Amazon Archer Minors, Amazon Archer Majors, Amazon Panarchos, and Enchanted Statues.
- The Amazons appear in Wonder Woman's entry and victory poses in Injustice: Gods Among Us. In the story mode, the Justice League's Wonder Woman is brought to Themyscira by the alternate Ares, who reveals that her counterpart in the Regime is rallying the Amazons to attack Metropolis and aid High Councillor Superman's plot. Wonder Woman defeats her alternate counterpart and persuades the Amazons to help the Insurgency fight against the Regime's forces. Following the Regime's defeat, Wonder Woman is shown dethroning her alternate counterpart, who is taken away by Amazon guards.

=== Miscellaneous ===
- The Amazons appear in the Smallville Season 11 digital comic.
- Several Amazons appear in the Injustice 2 prequel comic. Among them are Mala, Nubia, Menalippe, Philippus, and Antiope.

== See also ==
- Woman warrior
- List of women warriors in folklore
