= Wonder Woman: Bloodlines =

2019 film directed by Sam Liu

- Ultra HD Blu-ray cover
- Directed by: Sam Liu; Justin Copeland
- Screenplay by: Mairghread Scott
- Based on: Wonder Woman: Down to Earth by: Greg Rucka
- Produced by: Sam Liu; Amy McKenna
- Starring: Rosario Dawson; Jeffrey Donovan
- Edited by: Christopher D. Lozinski
- Music by: Frederik Wiedmann
- Production companies: Warner Bros. Animation; DC Entertainment
- Distributed by: Warner Bros. Home Entertainment
- Release date: October 5, 2019
- Running time: 79 minutes
- Country: United States
- Language: English

Wonder Woman: Bloodlines is a 2019 American animated superhero film focusing on the superheroine Wonder Woman, the fourteenth installment of the DC Animated Movie Universe and the 39th overall film of the DC Universe Animated Original Movies line. The film was released on digital platforms on October 5, 2019, and was released on 4K Ultra HD and Blu-ray on October 22. It focuses on Wonder Woman facing enemies of the past who come together and form Villainy Inc.

== Plot ==
In 2013, Princess Diana of Themyscira - home island of the warrior race the Amazons - rescues US pilot Captain Steve Trevor from a Parademon attack. (Note: Prior to the events of Justice League: War.) Diana treats Steve with a purple healing ray before her mother Queen Hippolyta takes him prisoner due to breaking the island's "no men" law. Diana breaks Steve out and sees an omen about an otherworldly invasion facilitated by his arrival. When Hippolyta demands Steve's re-incarceration, Diana defies her before leaving to protect man's world, prompting Hippolyta to disown her. Diana and Steve arrive in Washington, D.C. where Etta Candy takes them to archeologist Julia Kapatelis. While there, Diana meets Julia's daughter Vanessa, who grows jealous of Diana when her mother spends more time with Diana than her. Diana decides to stay in man's world and protect it as the superheroine "Wonder Woman".

Five years later, Julia requests help from Diana and Steve to find Vanessa, who has stolen an artifact from her superior Veronica Cale and plans to trade it with the villainous Doctor Poison. Diana, Steve and Julia intervene but are confronted by Poison's soldiers and Giganta, who uses an enhancement serum, but is ultimately defeated. During the battle Julia is fatally shot in a crossfire and Poison escapes with the artifact. Vanessa blames Diana for her mother's death before fleeing.

While visiting her mother's grave, Vanessa is recruited by Doctor Poison and Doctor Cyber, who transform Vanessa into Silver Swan. Meanwhile, Diana and Steve locate Poison in Qurac. The two travel there using a stealth jet provided by Etta. Upon arrival, they are attacked by Silver Swan, who Diana realizes is Vanessa and is defeated while Poison escapes with a prototype bioweapon. Diana and Steve take the unconscious Vanessa to Cale Pharmaceuticals. While there, Diana believes the purple healing ray can reverse Vanessa's transformation, but does not remember the location of Themyscira due to a mystic block. Cale reveals to Diana and Steve that Julia had been researching the island as a personal pet project. Diana finds a clue in Julia's former office that she must drink water from a fountain located at the temple of Pasiphaë to regain her knowledge of the location.

In the temple, Diana and Steve are confronted by Cheetah, who is now part of a team of supervillains called Villainy Inc. led by Poison and Cyber, who also uses a serum similar to Giganta's. Steve and Etta enter the maze in the temple, where they encounter and defeat a Minotaur. Diana subdues Cheetah, reunites with Steve and Etta, and drinks the fountain's water, regaining her memory. Diana also realizes that the Minotaur was enchanted to defend the fountain, and destroys it. By doing so, the Minotaur is set free, with Steve naming him Ferdinand.

The trio make it back to Cale Pharmaceuticals and pinpoint Themyscira's location, but Cyber interrupts them, revealing their organization's plan to steal Amazon artifacts for personal gain. Cyber reactivates Vanessa to attack Diana while the others escape. Eventually, Diana defeats Vanessa and lets her friends escape, while Vanessa flees. With the new information, Diana and Steve return to Themyscira, only to find it under siege by Villainy Inc. Vanessa distracts the heroes as Cyber and Poison unleash their endgame weapon, Medusa. Medusa refuses to be under their control and destroys Cyber. Poison offers Medusa an enhancement serum to win her favor, but Medusa turns her to stone and takes it anyway, beginning to destroy the city. Confronting Medusa and getting badly beaten, Diana blinds herself with Medusa's venom, allowing her to meet her head-on. Diana is battered to the ground but saved by Vanessa, who is inspired by her self-sacrifice, and together they kill Medusa. In the aftermath, Vanessa and Hippolyta reconcile with Diana. Hippolyta presents Diana as the champion of Themyscira and decides to open Themyscira to the outside world.

In a mid-credits scene, Diana returns to Washington and confronts Cale, who reveals herself as the true mastermind behind Villainy Inc. and the one who killed Julia. Cale claims she will invade Themyscira again to profit from the Amazons' technology, but Diana accepts her challenge and impales her sword in her desk, leaving confidently as Cale tries to remove the sword.

== Voice cast ==
Voice actor	Character
Rosario Dawson	Diana Prince / Wonder Woman
Jeffrey Donovan	Steve Trevor
Marie Avgeropoulos	Vanessa Kapatelis / Silver Swan
Adrienne C. Moore	Etta Candy
Kimberly Brooks	Barbara Minvera / Cheetah; Giganta
Courtenay Taylor	Doctor Poison
Constance Zimmer	Veronica Cale
Nia Vardalos	Julia Kapatelis
Michael Dorn	Ferdinand the Minotaur
Cree Summer	Hippolyta; Medusa
Mozhan Marnò	Doctor Cyber
Ray Chase	Lead Bandit

== Production ==
Wonder Woman: Bloodlines was announced at San Diego Comic-Con held in July 2018.

Rosario Dawson reprises the role of Wonder Woman from previous films. Other cast include Jeffrey Donovan as Steve Trevor, Marie Avgeropoulos as Vanessa Kapatelis/Silver Swan, Kimberly Brooks as Cheetah and Giganta, Michael Dorn as Ferdinand, Ray Chase as the lead bandit, Mozhan Marnò as Doctor Cyber, Adrienne C. Moore as Etta Candy, Courtenay Taylor as Doctor Poison, Nia Vardalos as Julia Kapatelis, and Constance Zimmer as Veronica Cale.

== Release ==
Wonder Woman: Bloodlines was released as a World Premiere film during New York Comic Con on October 5, 2019, and also released on digital platforms on the same day, and was released on 4K Ultra HD and Blu-ray on October 22.

== Reception ==
=== Critical reception ===
On the review aggregator Rotten Tomatoes, the film holds an approval rating of 88% based on eight reviews, with an average rating of 7.1/10. IGN gave the film a rating of 6.5/10.

=== Sales ===
The film earned $1,703,907 from domestic Blu-ray sales.
