= War of the Gods (comics) =

Comic book series

- Cover art to issue #1, art by George Pérez.

Publication information
- Publisher: DC Comics
- Schedule: Monthly
- Format: Mini-series
- Publication date: September - December 1991
- No. of issues: 4
- Main character(s): Wonder Woman; Circe

Creative team
- Written by: George Pérez, Russell Braun
- Artist(s): George Pérez, Russell Braun, Cynthia Martin, Romeo Tanghal, Pablo Marcos, Vince Giarrano, Scott Hanna, Russell Braun, Alan Kupperberg, Phil Jimenez, Gordon Purcell, Dick Giordano, Frank McLaughlin, and Gene D'Angelo

War of the Gods is an American four-issue comic book mini-series published by DC Comics in 1991.

Primarily centered on the character Wonder Woman, this storyline was intended to celebrate the character's 50th anniversary. It was written and drawn by George Pérez, who would leave the Wonder Woman (vol. 2) title following this storyline with #62.

== Prologue ==
As shown in the Wonder Woman (vol. 2) issues #51-57, after the Amazons announced themselves to the world in #50, Circe has been behind the scenes watching Diana's every move. Circe is responsible for a series of brutal murders that have occurred where various magical artifacts have been stolen. The Amazons are framed for these crimes and public hysteria is whipped up against them. With the disappearance of Queen Hippolyta, General Phillipus wounded by gunfire and the death of Hellene, some Amazons are taken into custody. Steve Trevor is forced by General George Yedziniak to attack Themyscira; an oncoming war is about to begin.

== Plot ==
Worldwide, ancient gods suddenly begin trying to destroy the Earth and each other. While the ancient Roman gods wage war with the Greek gods, the Egyptian, West African, Germanic, Mesopotamian and Thanagarian gods each want to recreate the world in their own images and attack the superheroes who stand in their way. Unknown to them, it is in fact the sorceress Circe who has led each of them to wage war on each other, so she can destroy the Earth goddess Gaea. With the threat of Wonder Woman stopping her, Circe makes sure she has her hands busy fighting Captain Marvel, under the influence of the Roman Gods, before he destroys the Greek Gods. Son of Vulcan was originally asked to be the Roman God's champion, but he declined.

Meanwhile, Black Adam recruits the Suicide Squad to help him launch an attack on Circe's fortress. The fight leads Circe to Themyscira, where after a confrontation, she kills Wonder Woman by turning her back into clay. While this happens, New Olympus is moved to Earth, where it ends up threatening Earth and all of existence. The superheroes convince the gods of every mythology to lay down their arms and join them in facing the true enemy manipulating them, revealed to the gods to be Circe. After Captain Marvel is freed from the Roman gods' influence with Shazam's help and Wonder Woman is brought back to life, Gaea regains her strength and the fight leads to Circe. In the battle, Circe is taken from Olympus to the Tomb of Cronus where she faces Wonder Woman and Donna Troy. Using the Talisman, Circe (who is blasting energy at Wonder Woman, who channels it into the dimensional star field material of Donna's costume) is absorbed and in turn her power fails causing her body to rapidly age and die which in turn sets free Hecate's disembodied soul. Hecate tries to take possession of Diana, but is destroyed by the Lasso of Truth. In the end, the War of the Gods is finally over, but at the price of Hermes', Eris', Son of Vulcan, and Harmonia's lives, as well as Circe herself (although she would return later by unknown means). Eris would also return later, albeit briefly during Phil Jimenez's tenure as writer and artist on Wonder Woman.

== Subplots ==
=== Wonder Woman #62 ===
Issue #62 was the final issue of George Pérez's run of Wonder Woman, as the tagline on the cover states An Era Ends for... Wonder Woman. The issue was not advertised as an aftermath to War of the Gods, but it takes place and was released following after the event's end.

Queen Hippolyta and Wonder Woman, mother and daughter, hug over how wonderful things turned out in the end. The Amazons rebuild their home and now they have sisters and brothers from Man's World. The world announced an apology for the blaming against the Amazons as Themyscira is such an ally the world needs. The same innocence goes for Steve, since he was revealed not to be under his own actions, but under General Yedziniak's. The fallen Amazons lay and are ignited in a ritual as those fallen can now go on their final journey to the Afterlife. Wonder Woman goes to the military hospital where General Philippus is recovering, and helps out with herbs to heal her. Later, Wonder Woman meets with Julia Kapatelis for Vanessa's graduation, where what is said at the graduation is the same on Themyscira and the world: the future awaiting them is about to take its first step for the new journey to start.

William Messner-Loebs would begin his run on the series with Wonder Woman Special #1, followed by issue #63.

== George Pérez's disputes with DC ==
Around the time of this story, George Pérez was having editorial problems that caused problems writing the storyline from its inception. He felt that DC Comics was not doing enough to celebrate Wonder Woman's anniversary that in turn would promote the story. Also, DC did not plan the story for newsstand distribution, but for direct sales stores only. Originally, the final issue was going to have Steve Trevor and Etta Candy marry, an event he had been building up to since the series was relaunched. DC stopped it so the next writer following Pérez, William Messner-Loebs, would do it instead. Because of this, Pérez would separate himself from DC for several years.

== Alternate versions ==
=== Tales from the Dark Multiverse ===
After the War of the Gods, Wonder Woman is possessed by the magic goddess Hecate, but manages to trap her in her subconsciousness. Phobos, a servant of Hecate, orchestrates an attack on Themyscira and the deaths of Diana's loved ones, causing an emotional response that allows Hecate to take over. Under Hecate's control, she declares war on both the Gods of Olympus and humanity's new gods: superheroes. Diana is eventually defeated by Earth's magic users, but remains under Hecate's control, imprisoned under Themyscira.

== Crossover titles ==
In addition to Perez's troubles with the promotion of the crossover, there were editorial problems as well, involving the then-upcoming Armageddon 2001 crossover which caused last minute changes to which titles and characters would be involved and to what degree. An extra issue of Captain Atom and Hawk and Dove's final issue were added after promotional materials were produced and shipped out to retailers, Justice League Europe #31 was not bannered as part of the crossover and numerous parts shipped late and out of order.

Part 1: War of The Gods #1

Part 2: Wonder Woman v2 #58

Part 3: Superman: The Man of Steel #3

Part 4: Hawkworld #15

Part 5: Starman #38

Part 6: L.E.G.I.O.N. '91 #31

Part 7: Hawk and Dove #28 (not originally announced as part of the crossover)

Part 8: Captain Atom #56 (not originally announced as part of the crossover, not cover bannered, part number left off cover)

Part 9: Doctor Fate #32

Part 10: Flash v2 #55

Part 11: Wonder Woman v2 #59

Part 12: Doctor Fate #33

Part 13: War of The Gods #2

Part 14: Justice League Europe #31 (not cover bannered as part of the crossover, part number left off cover: Thor, Loki, and Baldur appear, resolving plot thread in part 13)

Part 15: Batman #470

Part 16: Hawkworld #16

Part 17: Animal Man #40

Part 18: Captain Atom #57

Part 19: Wonder Woman v2 #60

Part 20: Suicide Squad #58 (mistakenly labeled as Part 19 on the cover)

Part 21: War of The Gods #3 (part number left off cover)

Part 22: The Demon #17

Part 23: The New Titans #81 (issues #78 and #79, though not labeled as part of the crossover, depict Donna Troy's abduction to New Olympus)

Part 24: Wonder Woman v2 #61

Part 25: War of The Gods #4 (part number left off cover of some editions)

== George Pérez's letter to Wonder Woman ==
The final page of Wonder Woman #62 features a letter from Pérez addressed to Wonder Woman herself:

Dear Princess Diana,

I just wanted to let you know just how grateful I was that you allowed me to document your adventures, and it is a great sadness that I must now announce my retirement from the Wonder Woman series.

I've learned a lot these past few years and I'd like to think that I'm a better person for having followed your adventures and hope I did your exploits justice.

As so often happens in life, it's time to move on to start working on that new chapter in the book of life (a recurring image you'll notice in my final issue). I leave you in the capable hands of one William Messner-Loebs, about whom you might want to ask your new friend Dr. Fate, and the talented Jill Thompson.

Well, that's it for me. I'm glad your current troubles are over and hope your current troubles will prove less hazardous. In your line of work I know that seems unlikely, but there's no harm in hoping.

Take care, Princess Diana. And as they said over at Themyscira: The Glory of Gaea be with you.
