= Silver Swan (character) =

DC Comics characters

- The Silver Swan (Vanessa Kapatelis) in Wonder Woman (vol. 2) #171 (June 2001), art by Phil Jimenez and Andy Lanning.

Publication information
- Publisher: DC Comics
- First appearance: Alexandros: Wonder Woman #288 (February 1982); Beaudry: Wonder Woman (vol. 2) #15 (March 1988); Kapatelis: (as Vanessa): Wonder Woman (vol. 2) #1 (October 1986); Kapatelis: (as Silver Swan): Wonder Woman (vol. 2) #171 (June 2001)
- Created by: Alexandros: Roy Thomas and Gene Colan; Beaudry: George Pérez; Kapatelis: George Pérez (Vanessa) Phil Jimenez (Vanessa as Silver Swan)

In-story information
- Alter ego: Helen Alexandros; Valerie Beaudry; Vanessa Kapatelis
- Abilities: Flight; Sonic cry; Metal claws (Kapatelis); Mechanized wings (Beaudry & Kapatelis); Technokinesis (Kapatelis)

The Silver Swan is a fictional character appearing in American comic books published by DC Comics, commonly as a recurring adversary of the superhero Wonder Woman. Capable of flight and possessing the superhuman ability to generate a devastating sonic cry, she first appeared in 1982 in Wonder Woman #288, written by Roy Thomas and illustrated by Gene Colan. Since then, the character has undergone several updates as comic book continuities have evolved and shifted. Indeed, there have been three different Silver Swans since the character's debut, including Helen Alexandros, the original Silver Swan; Valerie Beaudry, the second Silver Swan, debuting in 1988 in Wonder Woman (vol. 2) #15; and Vanessa Kapatelis, the third and current Silver Swan, debuting in 2001 in Wonder Woman (vol. 2) #171. The backstories of all three characters are inspired by Hans Christian Andersen's fairy tale The Ugly Duckling: Alexandros, Beaudry and Kapetelis all believe in different ways that they are undesirable, unattractive or unwanted, only to find themselves transformed into extraordinarily beautiful (and vengeful) super-powered women.

== Fictional character biography ==
=== Helen Alexandros ===
Helen Alexandros, the Bronze Age Silver Swan, receiving her powers from Mars in Wonder Woman #288, 1982; art by Gene Colan.

Born to Leda Alexandros, Helen Alexandros is a bitter ballet dancer who, disgusted by being overlooked and cruelly treated because of her homely appearance, struck a bargain with Mars to have a beautiful face and body in return for destroying man's champion, Wonder Woman. Helen becomes the mystically-created alter ego Silver Swan in the Pre-Crisis universe.

Diana Prince comes upon a gang of bank robbers, and a new arrival, a flying, costumed female who calls herself the Silver Swan, helps her bring them in. The Silver Swan flies off, and Wonder Woman discovers that the briefcase of secret documents she and Steve Trevor had been carrying is gone. Later, Diana and Etta Candy discover a rent raise has made it necessary for them to take on a new roommate. The first applicant, whom they accept, is Helen Alexandros, who has found the briefcase and returns it to Diana.

Unknown to both of them, the plain-faced, skin-blemished Helen is a former ballerina who has been badly hurt by rejections due to her "ugly duckling" face. After one performance in an ancient temple in Greece, Helen cried out to the gods that she hated men. At that point, Mars appeared from Mount Olympus and revealed to Helena that she was a descendant on her mother's side from Helen of Sparta, daughter of Zeus and Leda. When Mars asked if she was ready to accept her "heritage of blood", Helen agreed, and was transformed into the beautiful Silver Swan, with the powers of flight, great strength, and a "swan song" which could wreak destruction. Mars told the Swan that Helen would be able to change into her for an hour at a time, as long as she served him, and on the day that she destroyed Wonder Woman, she would become the Silver Swan forever.

Later, when Wonder Woman is attempting to return the briefcase, the Silver Swan snatches it away and defeats the Amazon in battle. But, unwilling to destroy Wonder Woman around witnesses, the Swan turns over the briefcase and convinces Gen. Darnell that she mistakenly thought Wonder Woman was stealing it. Meanwhile, Doctor Psycho is able to use Steve Trevor to produce enough ectoplasm to turn him into Captain Wonder, in which identity he attacks Wonder Woman, and helps the Swan rope in Wonder Woman. Captain Wonder and Silver Swan fall in love with each other at first sight. They opt to take the captive heroine to the White House and kill her before the eyes of President of the United States Ronald Reagan. Mars appears to the Swan and demands that she order Captain Wonder to send the Robot Plane crashing into the White House and thus murder the President.

Steve Trevor awakens from Dr. Psycho's spell and is able to break Psycho's ability to maintain his Captain Wonder persona. Psycho crashes to Earth unharmed and Wonder Woman is able to break free. Wonder Woman battles the Silver Swan and defeats her, and the Amazon manages to prevent her plane from smashing the White House and endangering President Reagan. Disappointed in the Swan, Mars withdraws her powers and she returns to her Helen Alexandros identity, after which she disappears.

The Silver Swan reappeared in a battle arranged behind the scenes by the Monitor as one of the tests he launched to prepare for the coming multiversal crisis. The Swan appeared late one night in a Pentagon storage facility, encountering the Angle Man, Captain Wonder, and the Cheetah. They were defeated when Etta Candy used Doctor Psycho's ectoplasmitron to create for herself a superpowered identity based on Wonder Woman.

=== Valerie Beaudry ===
Valerie Beaudry, the post-Crisis Silver Swan on the cover of Wonder Woman (vol. 2) #16, 1988, art by George Pérez.

In the Post-Crisis continuity, Valerie Beaudry was exposed to radiation from nuclear tests while in the womb. This caused her to be horribly deformed. Valerie comes under the influence of a man named Henry Cobb Armbruster. The head of Armbruster International, he exploited Valerie's need for acceptance by choosing her for his Silver Swan project. Valerie was mutated to become the Silver Swan, granting her incredible beauty as well as tremendous hypersonic powers. He extended his control over Valerie by marrying her. He also used her to battle Wonder Woman and Ed Indelicato. Eventually, thanks to Diana and her pen pal, Maxine Sterenbuch, who had formed a true friendship with her over the years, Valerie saw Armbruster for who he truly was and divorced him.

Valerie, wanting to repay Diana for helping her, offered her assistance during her time as a fugitive during War of the Gods. Diana refused however, not wanting Valerie to be put in harm's way, despite her incredible power. Nevertheless, she joined many of Earth's heroes in the battle against Circe. She later joined a short-lived superteam known as the Captains of Industry. Eventually, Valerie retired her identity as the Silver Swan, but not before serving a stint in the Suicide Squad. She also appeared in Underworld Unleashed as one of many characters whom the demon Neron approached to exchange their souls to him for enhanced power. She rejected his offer, opting instead for a quiet life in suburbia, not far from her good friend Maxine.

Some time later, Valerie returned to the Silver Swan role against her will after reality was altered during JLA/Avengers. She appeared as part of a team of villains sent to attack the assembled heroes, but was quickly defeated by the Vision. Valerie was last seen standing in an energy bubble, bound and gagged with restraints conjured by the briefly resurrected Hal Jordan. After reality was restored at the event's conclusion, Valerie presumably returned to her peaceful civilian life.

=== Vanessa Kapatelis ===
Vanessa Kapatelis and Wonder Woman, art by George Pérez.

Julia Kapatelis became pregnant while she and her husband, David Kapatelis, were exploring Scotland. As a joke, David wanted to name their unborn child "Nessie" after the local Scottish creature the Loch Ness Monster. Though amused, Julia did not agree but settled on Vanessa as a close substitute. Julia remained married to David until his death 22 years into their marriage, when Vanessa was 5 years old, while exploring ruins in Egypt. Deciding to make a fresh start, Julia took Vanessa to live in the U.S. where she eventually became the Dean for the Department of History and Geology at Harvard University.

While living on Beacon Hill in Boston, Massachusetts, Vanessa grew up feeling like an awkward outsider in high school. During this time, she had the chance to meet Wonder Woman when her mother took in the Amazon when she first arrived in the United States. At first, Vanessa was jealous of Wonder Woman's beauty, but after Diana rescued her from Decay, the two got to know each other better. Nessie started to love Wonder Woman as an elder sister and dreamed of fighting evil alongside her.

The trauma of her father's death and the suicide of her best friend Lucy made Vanessa start to blame herself for all the bad things that happened to people she cared about, a situation worsened by Doctor Psycho's creation of terrible nightmares where she was made to feel powerless. Vanessa was sent to a school counselor, who unbeknownst to her was under Psycho's control. The counselor persuaded Julia that Wonder Woman's presence was only making things worse for her daughter, and that she needed to leave their home.

Vanessa eventually recovered, but she could not forgive her mother for making Diana leave. She started to blame Diana for abandoning her. During this time, Vanessa was abducted by a villain known as the White Magician before being rescued by Diana. Her mixed emotions were a perfect target for Circe, who plotted to use vulnerable young woman as a weapon. Thus, using Sebastian Ballesteros (the latest Cheetah) as a lure, Dr. Psycho and Circe kidnapped Vanessa, and through brainwashing and sorcery, transformed her into a new Silver Swan. Now driven by anger and resentment, the Silver Swan attacked Diana and Wonder Girl, the latter of whom she considered a usurper of her "entitled" role. The result of this brought about the destruction of Cassie Sandmark's school and the death of over a hundred people as well as exposing Cassie's identity. Vanessa had become, effectively, a terrorist, but before Diana could attempt any resolution, the Imperiex attack and Circe's takeover of New York City occurred.

After Circe was defeated, Diana took Vanessa to a hospital in Buenos Aires where she could heal. While she was recovering, Ballesteros abducted her. Veronica Cale, who hated and envied Diana, bought Nessie from him and gave her new cybernetic implants to restore her powers before brainwashing and sending her against Diana again. When Diana defeated Vanessa, she convinced one of Cale's scientists to remove the implants. Diana then sent Vanessa to Themyscira for surgical recovery.

A Silver Swan was present in Salvation Run among the other exiled villains and was seen in Final Crisis as a victim of the Anti-Life Equation. Later, she appears in a grouping of Wonder Woman's adversaries, all gathered by Circe. The villains are defeated. Later, they are taken into custody by the Department of Metahuman Affairs. It appears this may be a new incarnation of the Silver Swan as Vanessa is later shown having made a complete physical and mental recovery; she is seen graduating from college, with her mother, Steve Trevor, Etta Candy, Vanessa's uncle Stavros and Diana herself all in attendance at the ceremony.

==== DC Rebirth ====
After the events of DC Rebirth, the Silver Swan's history was altered. Vanessa Kapatelis was a young woman who Wonder Woman rescued after a battle with Major Disaster. However, during the battle, Vanessa was partially buried under rubble. When paramedics took Vanessa to the hospital, it was revealed that Vanessa had lost the ability to walk. Throughout the next few months, Wonder Woman kept Vanessa company in the hospital alongside Vanessa's mother Julia. Vanessa and Wonder Woman grew closer to the point that Vanessa began to fashion the persona of "Silver Swan", which she dreamed of using to fight crime alongside her idol.

Vanessa was later approached by doctors about participating in a unique procedure involving nanites that they had learned about from Cyborg. This procedure enabled Vanessa to walk again. Wonder Woman soon visited Vanessa less and less, and when her mother died in a strange car accident, Vanessa thought she had nobody left. Coming to hate Wonder Woman for seemingly abandoning her, Vanessa used her nanites to create a twisted version of her Silver Swan costume and powers to go with it.

After receiving a distress call from a family that she had saved earlier, Wonder Woman traveled to their house only to find the Silver Swan standing over their corpses. Silver Swan then began relentlessly attacking Wonder Woman and her brother, Jason, who joined the fight. Though she proves to be a formidable foe, Diana succeeded in defeating her by causing her to run out of breath from using her sonic scream, forcing her to revert to Vanessa. Her comatose body was placed in the care of S.T.A.R. Labs in a cell designed to hold her in case she transforms. Vanessa is overseen by Doctor Psycho posing as a S.T.A.R. Labs scientist.

When the Sovereign conspired to turn the world against the Amazons, Sarge Steel recruited Silver Swan and several other villains to kill Wonder Woman.

== Powers, abilities, and weapons ==
Each Silver Swan has the ability to create powerful sound waves with her voice. Their "swan songs" are capable of devastating a small area of land with their destructive force. By creating a low-level humming, the Silver Swan can form a protective shield around herself that can deflect bullets and projectiles.

Unlike the Pre-Crisis version, whose abilities were acquired supernaturally through the god Mars, the two Post-Crisis Silver Swans need their artificial wings to control their flight motion.

Each version also possesses an additional ability which makes her unique from the other Silver Swans: Helen Alexandros has superhuman strength. It was speculated that Valerie Beaudry had the ability to rearrange matter with her voice (but she never had a chance to be trained in doing so). Vanessa Kapatelis has sharpened nails and the telepathic ability to control birds.

In the DC Rebirth continuity, Vanessa's powers stem from an experimental nanite treatment intended to cure her paralysis. Once her mind snaps, the nanites (which are programmed to react accordingly based on Vanessa's thoughts) alter her physiology and grant her the cybernetic abilities to become Silver Swan, including a pair of functional wings.

In this form Vanessa can easily match Wonder Woman in a fight and is equipped with a pair of bionic wings which allow her to fly or use their razor-sharp edges to slice through targets. She can also project devastating sonic blasts with her voice and has knife edged claws at the ends of her fingertips. The post-Rebirth iterations Nanites can also be used to hack any and every computerized mainframe in the world, Diana commenting her technological interfacing potentially could rival Cyborg of the Justice League.

== Other versions ==
=== JLA/Avengers ===
Silver Swan appears in JLA/Avengers as an enthralled minion of Krona.

=== Flashpoint ===
An alternate universe variant of Silver Swan appears in Flashpoint as a member of the Furies.

=== Sensational Wonder Woman ===
Silver Swan appears in Sensational Wonder Woman.

== In other media ==
- The Vanessa Kapatelis incarnation of Silver Swan appears in Wonder Woman: Bloodlines, voiced by Marie Avgeropoulos. This version becomes Silver Swan after her mother is killed on the orders of Veronica Cale; blaming Wonder Woman, Vanessa turns to Villainy Inc. for extensive body-reconstruction surgeries that convert her into a cyborg. After failing to take revenge on Wonder Woman and learning that she is not to blame for what happened, Silver Swan fights alongside her before the two reconcile.
- The Vanessa Kapatelis incarnation of Silver Swan appears as a character summon in Scribblenauts Unmasked: A DC Comics Adventure.
- An unidentified incarnation of Silver Swan appears in Wonder Woman '77 as the lead singer of a band called "Silver Swan and the Starlings".

== See also ==
- List of Wonder Woman enemies
