= Doctor Psycho =

- Edgar Cizko as Doctor Psycho as depicted from a splash page of Wonder Woman #789. Art by Wade Von Grawbadger.

Publication information
- Publisher: DC Comics
- First appearance: Wonder Woman #5 (June / July 1943)
- Created by: William Moulton Marston; Harry G. Peter

In-story information
- Alter ego: Edgar Cizko; Cyril Psycho; Leon Zeiko
- Species: (Zeiko): Human (Cizko & Psycho): Metahuman
- Team affiliations: Secret Society of Super Villains; Legion of Doom; Cabal; Suicide Squad
- Notable aliases: Carlo Montez; Steve Trevor; Captain Wonder
- Abilities: (All): Genius-level intellect; Ectoplasm manipulation; Illusion casting; Hypnotism; Inventive Aptitude; (Pre & Post-Crisis): Telepathy; Mind control; Possession; Mind Swapping; (New 52): Psychokinesis; Astral projection; Telekinesis; Levitation; Psychic Constructs; Neural jumpstart; (Rebirth/Infinite Frontier): Access to mystic artifacts; Divine Empowerment

Doctor Psycho is a fictional character appearing in DC Comics publications and related media, commonly as a recurring adversary of the superhero Wonder Woman. Doctor Psycho first appears in Wonder Woman #5 (1943), written by Wonder Woman creator William Moulton Marston. Doctor Psycho has been one of Wonder Woman's most persistent enemies, reappearing throughout the Golden, Silver, Bronze, and Modern Age of Comics.

Over the decades, Doctor Psycho has undergone several minor updates as comics continuities have shifted and evolved, though his distinctive physical appearance has remained largely faithful to artist Harry G. Peter's original 1943 design. After DC Comics rebooted its continuity in 1985 (in a publication event known as the Crisis on Infinite Earths), Wonder Woman, her supporting characters and many of her foes were re-imagined and reintroduced. Prior to this reboot, Psycho demonstrated a command over the occult and was able to harness supernatural energies to project illusions. Since his post-Crisis reintroduction, the character has been presented as an extremely powerful telepath and telekinetic. Despite these changes, Psycho has consistently been portrayed as a misogynistic person of short stature who has mental illness (ranging from mild obsessiveness to full-blown dissociation).

Doctor Psycho made his animation debut as a regular in the TV series Harley Quinn, voiced by Tony Hale.

== Background ==
The character of Doctor Psycho was created by William Moulton Marston, creator of Wonder Woman and author of her original adventures, as an allegory of the folly of abnormal emotions such as misogyny and other hatreds, as well as to be another embodiment of what he called "less actively developed men" (emotionally misaligned) who needed emotional reform by a love leader (Wonder Woman). Marston's creation of Psycho drew upon his interest in metaphysics and spiritualism. Marston, a psychologist, created Psycho as a murderous psychopath with an intense hatred of women. The character was partly inspired by actor Lon Chaney ("Man of a thousand faces") and partly by Marston's undergraduate advisor Hugo Münsterberg, who was opposed to women's suffrage and feminism. Psycho was also one of several villains created for Wonder Woman who were occultists, beguiling the masses for their own self-enriching purposes.

Wonder Woman's rogues and supporting cast were largely jettisoned during the period that Robert Kanigher wrote and edited the issues, but Doctor Psycho remained one of the few villains to appear in the Golden, Silver, and Bronze Age adventures. The character was also one of the few such villains to be modernized in the early issues of the post-Crisis on Infinite Earths Wonder Woman.

== Fictional character biography ==
=== Pre-Crisis ===
Doctor Psycho first appears as a pawn of the Duke of Deception. Mars, enraged that women were gaining power in Earth society and potentially threatening his ability to engulf the world in war, ordered Deception to discredit women. Deception called upon Psycho to set about eliminating women from the war effort.

Doctor Psycho, known as Cyril Psycho, was revealed in flashback to have been a medical student who was frequently humiliated by his peers. He discovered that his fiancée Marva Jane Gray was in love with college athletic champion Ben Bradley. Bradley removed him as a rival for Marva's affections by stealing $125,000 worth of radium from a college laboratory and hunching down in disguise so that Marva would think she saw her diminutive fiancé as the culprit.

Convicted on the basis of Marva's testimony, Psycho seethed behind bars for years, planning his revenge while developing an intense hatred of all women. Upon his release, he tortured and killed Bradley, who falsely confessed that Marva was his willing accomplice. Psycho then kidnapped and tortured Marva, hypnotically compelling her to marry him, and then subjecting her to daily occult experiments.

Learning that he could use Marva as a medium for summoning ectoplasm he could use at will to fashion and animate human forms around his own misshapen body, he created a new career for himself as an occultist and sham psychic who developed a following of millions.

At Deception's urging, he used his fame as an occultist to campaign for eliminating women from the war effort by creating an ectoplasmic form purporting to be the spirit of George Washington, claiming that women were hindering the war effort. He also disguised himself as Colonel Darnell of Military Intelligence to frame female staff of military intelligence for espionage.

With the aid of Steve Trevor and the Holliday College girls, Wonder Woman disrupted his plot but was forced to release him, unable to prove any of his crimes in a court of law. Doctor Psycho fixated his pathological hatred of women into fantasies of revenge against Wonder Woman. Freed from Psycho's influence, Marva joined the WAACs and helped Wonder Woman expose Nazi saboteur Stoffer, who had disguised himself as General Scott.

Psycho was eventually imprisoned but escaped by faking his own death, kidnapping Marva and then his former secretary, Joan White, to use as mediums for his ectoplasmic power. He attempted to court Etta Candy in a disguise, but his cover was blown by Etta's suitor Oscar Sweetgulper, and he was returned to prison.

In the Golden Age, Psycho's brother Ironsides was a brilliant geologist who was also a villain. Ironsides invented the Iron Giant's disguise. He did not, however, display any superpowers.

Psycho eventually realized that he could use Steve Trevor as a medium. Kidnapping Trevor, he fashioned an ectoplasmic dream of power from Trevor's unconscious mind and became the powerful Captain Wonder who teamed with the Silver Swan to destroy Wonder Woman. His powerful form was destroyed when Trevor awakened from his slumber.

When the Monitor was testing heroes and villains in the run-up to the Crisis on Infinite Earths, he set up Doctor Psycho to retrieve ectoplasmic machinery from military intelligence and to fight with several of Wonder Woman's other rogues, but they were defeated by the combined might of Wonder Woman and Etta Candy, who used the ectoplasm machine to create a superpowered version of herself patterned after Wonder Woman.

=== Post-Crisis ===
Post-Crisis Dr. Psycho is introduced as Edgar Cizko, a telepath with the ability to enter and sometimes shape other people's dreams. Psycho was enlisted by Circe to create disturbing dreams for Wonder Woman's close friend, Vanessa Kapatelis, with the result that Wonder Woman would be forced to separate herself from her closest allies. This was part of a plot intended to leave Wonder Woman isolated and create widespread public fear of her fellow Amazons. Psycho later helps warp Kapatelis' damaged psyche to turn her into the new Silver Swan.

Dr. Psycho's plans are foiled and he subsequently spends some time as a patient in a mental facility, confined to a padded room and a straitjacket. Several members of the time-lost Legion of Super-Heroes were in telepathic range. When Saturn Girl mentally shouts for a lost member, this awakened Dr. Psycho enough for him to attack several staff members and flee. The call brought him to the Legion, whom he also attacks.

In the Villains United miniseries leading up to Infinite Crisis, Psycho appears as a core member of Lex Luthor's Secret Society of Super Villains. Working with Talia al Ghul, he recruits many supervillains for the Society, but he is rejected and successfully rebuffed by Catman. He threatens to have Catman kill himself. The presence of the man's loyal pack of lions convinces Psycho that he might be eaten if he forces Catman to harm himself. This rejection angers him, causing much grumbling for some time afterwards. He also spends time working with Deathstroke to capture one of the Marvel Family. Other members of the Society realize that Psycho is trying to mentally influence them. Unaffected, they dismiss it as something to be expected.

Following Infinite Crisis, Psycho travels with Warp to free Doomsday from captivity near the center of the Earth. He takes control of Doomsday and uses him to spearhead a supervillain assault on Metropolis. The villains lose this battle.

During One Year Later, Doctor Psycho is arrested and put on trial with Kate Spencer (Manhunter) as his defense attorney. Following his arrest, he is abandoned by the Secret Society of Super Villains. During the trial, he uses his mind-controlling abilities to make Spencer dream of herself dressed as Wonder Woman in a scene reminiscent of the Roman Colosseum. Before the trial verdict could be revealed, his powers are returned to him as a result of his ties to the Society who had constructed the machine that was blocking them. He uses his telepathy to hold the people in the courtroom hostage.

This forces Spencer to try to put on her uniform, but she instead reveals herself to Doctor Psycho as Manhunter. Psycho then compels Kate to put on her suit, but he drops his guard to sneak a kiss with her, resulting in him being stabbed in the stomach and head. This causes him to forget about Kate's alter-ego and lose his powers.

Doctor Psycho was subsequently shown in a position of authority with the Society in the Secret Six miniseries. He worked with former enemy Cheshire for Vandal Savage, hiring various villains to put out hits on other Secret Six members. In the final issue of Secret Six (December 2006), he is stabbed repeatedly and seriously injured by the Mad Hatter.

He resurfaced with his powers restored and amplified by Circe in the Wonder Woman series beginning in 2006. He was assisting Cheetah and Giganta. On the cover of Justice League of America (vol. 2) #13, it shows Doctor Psycho as a member of the latest Injustice League.

During the Final Crisis storyline, Genocide was sent to the headquarters of the Department of Metahuman Affairs (DMA) to retrieve Doctor Psycho, who was held captive there.

=== The New 52 ===
In September 2011, The New 52 rebooted DC's continuity. In this new timeline, Doctor Psycho first appears in Superboy; a con man psychic who practices seance, using his telepathy to steal the identities of customers in Manhattan. The purpose of this guise is to hide from H.I.V.E., who are hunting those with telepathic abilities. He first encounters Superboy after hearing about aliens in the city. His astral form is unintentionally pulled into the mind of Superboy, who is fighting Plasmus.

After learning of Superboy's origin (which remains unknown to Superboy), he attempts to befriend him. The two are attacked by agents of H.I.V.E, which they defeat. They form an alliance against the organization. During their investigation, they encounter Sarah, a girl with psionic powers that manifest into a being called Decay; she had been previously experimented on by H.I.V.E.

Doctor Psycho later appears in Teen Titans (vol. 4) #11, where he is at the Metropolis prison talking with Psimon. Then he appears in Teen Titans (vol. 4) #13, where he is trying to acquire Raven's powers, but he accidentally looks into her mind, where he sees her killing him.

Later during the "Trinity War" storyline, Question gives Superman a newspaper clipping stating that Doctor Psycho was sighted in Khandaq the day when Doctor Light was killed. This causes Superman, Question, and the Justice League to go after Doctor Psycho. Superman, Question, and the others arrive in Pittsburgh to confront Doctor Psycho. Martian Manhunter looks into Doctor Psycho's mind and learns that he was sent to Khandaq by the Secret Society but did not do anything to control Superman's mind.

In Forever Evil, Doctor Psycho is among the villains recruited by the Crime Syndicate to join the Secret Society of Super Villains. Then he appears in Justice League (vol. 2) #29, where he is sent by the Society, along with the Fearsome Five and Hector Hammond, to fight against Cyborg and the Metal Men. He ends up being defeated by the Metal Man, Gold.

=== DC Rebirth ===
After the events of DC Rebirth, Doctor Psycho's history had been altered. Using his illusions to pose as a scientist for A.R.G.U.S. named Dr. Edward Carne, Doctor Psycho was first seen after Vanessa Kapatelis was defeated and brought into custody by Wonder Woman. As Doctor Carne, Psycho told Wonder Woman that when Vanessa woke from her comatose state that he would be there for her.

Doctor Psycho later appears as a member of the Cabal alongside Per Degaton, Queen Bee, Amazo, and Hugo Strange.

Later, Doctor Psycho is one of several powerful psychics kidnapped by Amanda Waller to hack into Brainiac's mind.

In Doomsday Clock, Doctor Psycho is among the villains who attend an underground meeting held by the Riddler to discuss the Superman Theory.

When the Sovereign conspires to turn the world against the Amazons, Sarge Steel recruits Doctor Psycho and several other villains to kill Wonder Woman.

== Powers and abilities ==
Doctor Psycho is a skilled occultist and utilizes psionic powers to traumatize or terrify those who stand in his way. In two original appearances, he hypnotizes his victims to draw ectoplasm into the physical world, which Psycho shaped into various disguises.

In The New 52 continuity, Doctor Psycho possesses psychokinetic capabilities, although Edgar has stated that he had possessed every one of them imaginable. However, he does not have the enough energy required to use his abilities in their fullest capacity. He can overcome this weakness by siphoning mental energies from other psychic individuals, such as Superboy.

== Other versions ==
An original incarnation of Doctor Psycho appears in Wonder Woman: Earth One (vol. 2) by writer Grant Morrison and artist Yanick Paquette. This version is Leon Zeiko, a hypnotist and pick-up artist of average height.

== In other media ==
=== Television ===
- Doctor Psycho appears in the Powerless episode "Emergency Punch-Up", portrayed by an uncredited Ronnie Zappa.
- Doctor Psycho appears in Harley Quinn, voiced by Tony Hale. This version is described as "an angry misogynist dwarf with telekinesis". Additionally, he has a Napoleon complex, which stemmed from not being able to ride a Ferris wheel due to his short stature as a child. He became a villain after the Ferris wheel collapsed, which made him realize he enjoyed seeing people suffer. After being ousted from the Legion of Doom for calling Wonder Woman and his wife Giganta the "C-word" on live television and being divorced by the latter, he spends the first two seasons reluctantly joining forces with Harley Quinn's crew to get back into the world of supervillainy and reconciling with his estranged son Herman until Harley gains, then relinquishes, control of a Parademon army. Furious over this, he quits the crew and joins forces with the Riddler to obtain a mind control helmet so he can enslave the Parademons that Harley left behind and most of her crew and strikes a deal with Darkseid to kill Harley in exchange for an army large enough to take over the world. After being foiled by Harley, Poison Ivy, and the Justice League, he is subsequently sent to Arkham Asylum, where he joins Mayor Joker's rehabilitation program and starts an anger-management podcast that he runs from within his cell in the third season.

=== Video games ===
- Doctor Psycho appears in DC Universe Online, voiced by Robert Matney. This version is a member of the Secret Society of Super Villains who runs a LexCorp-funded experimental facility within Metropolis General Hospital. In the villain campaign, the players help him capture Supergirl so he can study her DNA on Lex Luthor's behalf. In the hero campaign, the heroes defeat Psycho and rescue Supergirl.
- Doctor Psycho appears as a character summon in Scribblenauts Unmasked: A DC Comics Adventure.

=== Miscellaneous ===
- Doctor Psycho appears in Dr. Psycho's Circus of Crime, by Paul Kupperberg and published by Capstone as part of their DC Super Heroes line of illustrated children's books.
- Doctor Psycho appears in a flashback depicted in Teen Titans Go! #54.
- Doctor Psycho appears in All-New Batman: The Brave and the Bold #4.
- Doctor Psycho appears in Wonder Woman '77 Special #1. This version possesses telepathic machines and is imprisoned in a mental institution.
- An alternate universe variant of Doctor Psycho appears in issue #2 of the Justice League: Gods and Monsters tie-in comics. This version is Dr. Jackson Alpert, a former member of the CIA's MKUltra program who disagreed with his superiors and conducted experiments on unwilling and unaware subjects using psychotropic drugs so he could "set them free" and bring them to the next stage of human evolution. After leaving the CIA, Alpert traveled to New York to continue his experiments, turning his subjects into wild, violent creatures in the process. After acquiring Bekka / Wonder Woman's Mother Box's crystal gems, Alpert accelerated his research, founded the Eternity Institute in Switzerland, became a recluse, developed extraordinary advances in science, medicine, and technology, and secretly harvested the Justice League's DNA over the course of the next 40 years. Additionally, he created the Forever People as a result of his efforts to further develop humanity and lead them to a new world of peace and order. In his dying years, he evolves into Imperiex using the League's DNA and the Forever Formula, but he is killed by Bekka.

== See also ==
- List of Wonder Woman enemies
