= Antiope (character) =

DC Comics character

- Antiope, from Wonder Woman vol. 2 #177 (February 2002). Art by Phil Jimenez.

Publication information
- Publisher: DC Comics
- First appearance: Wonder Woman #312 (February 1984)
- Created by: Dan Mishkin (writer); Don Heck (penciler)

In-story information
- Team affiliations: Amazons
- Abilities: Enhanced strength, enhanced speed, enhanced durability, and highly developed fighting skills.

Antiope is a fictional character appearing in American comic books published by DC Comics, usually as a supporting character in stories featuring Wonder Woman and the Amazons of Paradise Island/Themyscira. Created by writer Dan Mishkin and visualized by artist Don Heck, she first appeared in Wonder Woman #312 (February 1984), and is based on the mythological Antiope, one of the mythological Amazons.

In most incarnations Antiope is depicted as the sister of Wonder Woman's mother, Queen Hippolyta. In the continuity of DC Comics' 2011 reboot, The New 52, she is also known as Alcippe, and is Hippolyta's mother and the founding leader of the Amazons of Bana-Mighdall, who is worshiped by them as a sacred ancestor.

In the 2017 DC Extended Universe live-action feature film Wonder Woman, she was portrayed by Robin Wright. Wright returned to portray the character in flashbacks in the 2020 film Wonder Woman 1984.

== Fictional character biography ==
Antiope is introduced in Wonder Woman #312 in February 1984 as a high-ranking Amazon who is disillusioned with Hippolyta's rule and plots to overthrow her. She is killed by the Anti-Monitor's Shadow Demons in Crisis on Infinite Earths.

Following Crisis on Infinite Earths, DC's continuity is rebooted. Antiope is resurrected and depicted as the reincarnation of a woman who was killed years prior. She helps found Themyscira before being killed by Ariadne, and returns as a spirit to guide Hippolyta's daughter Diana.

== Abilities ==
All Themyscirian Amazons possess various degrees of superhuman strength, speed, stamina and extraordinarily acute senses which were gifts they were blessed with by their gods. As shown by various tribe members, they have the capability to break apart steel and concrete with their bare hands, jump over 12 feet from a standing position, have a high durability factor, enhanced healing, and the ability to absorb and process a vast amount of knowledge in a short period of time.

Themyscirian Amazons can heal themselves by merging with the Earth and reforming their bodies.

== In other media ==
Robin Wright as Antiope in Wonder Woman (2017).

=== Television ===
- Antiope appears in Justice League, voiced by Maggie Wheeler.
- Antiope appears in the DC Super Hero Girls episode "#AwesomeAuntAntiope", voiced by April Winchell. This version is rebellious, fun-loving, and rides a motorcycle.

=== Film ===
- Antiope appears in films set in the DC Extended Universe (DCEU), portrayed by Robin Wright:
  - Antiope first appears in Wonder Woman (2017). Director Patty Jenkins said that they needed "someone who seems under control and is not overly aggressive, but who is truly a badass", regarding Wright's casting as Antiope. Producer Charles Roven calls the character "the greatest warrior of all time". In the film, Diana is jointly raised by Queen Hippolyta, her sister General Antiope, and Lieutenant Menalippe; while Hippolyta wants to shield young Diana from the outside world, Antiope wants to train her as a warrior. Hippolyta and Antiope share the secret that Diana is Hippolyta's daughter with the god Zeus, and that their nemesis, the war god Ares, will someday try to destroy her as he did the other gods who opposed him. Going against Hippolyta's wishes, Antiope secretly trains Diana in combat, and ultimately convinces Hippolyta that though Diana's use of her powers will attract Ares, only learning to use them can save her. When the Germans later invade Themyscira in pursuit of Steve Trevor, Antiope sacrifices herself to save Diana.
  - Antiope appears in a flashback in Justice League (2017), fighting Darkseid's first attempted invasion of Earth millennia ago.
  - Antiope appears in a flashback in Wonder Woman 1984 (2020). When Diana was a child, Antiope prepared her for an athletic competition. However, when Diana fell off her horse and took a shortcut to catch up to it missing the checkpoint, Antiope pulled her out of the competition while commenting that "no true hero is born from lies".
