= Themyscira (DC Comics) =

Fictional location in DC Comics

- A rebuilt and relocated Themyscira as seen in Wonder Woman (vol. 2) #177 (Feb 2002), art by Phil Jimenez.
- First appearance: As Paradise Island: All Star Comics #8 (October 1941) (Note: All Star Comics #8 was cover-dated December–January 1941–1942, but published 21 October 1941.); As Themyscira: Wonder Woman (vol. 1) #310 (December 1983)
- Created by: William Moulton Marston; Harry G. Peter

In-universe information
- Type: City-state / Island country
- Race: Amazons
- Locations: Earth, in the midst of a vast ocean.
- Characters: Wonder Woman; Donna Troy; Hippolyta; Mala; Philippus
- Publisher: DC Comics

Themyscira (/ˌθɛmɪˈskɪrə/) is a fictional unitary sovereign city-state and archipelagic island nation appearing in American comic books published by DC Comics. Previously known as Paradise Island and the Amazon Isles, it first appeared in All Star Comics #8 (October 1941).

Themyscira is a homogeneous nation of women governed by Aphrodite's Law, which declared that the Amazons would be immortal as long as no man sets foot on their island. Men are banned from Themyscira under penalty of death. Themyscira's location is undisclosed; as a security measure, the island can shift its location over both land and time, remains undetectable from the perspective of any outside observer, and as soon as anyone leaves the island, they forget its location.

Themyscira is the theocracy and capital city that serves as the Amazonians' government and place of origin for Wonder Woman. The name for the entire archipelago became "The Paradise Islands", when the city was renamed "Themyscira" with the character's February 1987 relaunch in Wonder Woman (vol. 2) #1. Both the island and city are named after the mythological city of Themiscyra, the capital of the Amazons in Greek mythology.

Themyscira made its cinematic debut in the 2017 films Wonder Woman and Justice League, and appeared in the 2020 sequel Wonder Woman 1984, set in the DC Extended Universe.

== Publication history ==
=== Pre-Crisis (1941–1987) ===
When Wonder Woman's homeland is first introduced in 1941, it is referred to as Paradise Island, a secret and hidden island on Earth inhabited by the Amazons of myth. The Amazons were given a break from the hostilities and temptations of Man's World, and so were decreed to start a new life-improving themselves by sequestering themselves to this island away from ancient Greece, after being enslaved by Hercules. With the island blessed by the Olympian Gods, no man was allowed to physically set foot on it. When United States Army intelligence officer Steve Trevor's plane crashes there during World War II, he is nursed back to health just outside of the capital city by Princess Diana, daughter of the island's Queen Hippolyta. Diana later competes against other Amazons to become Wonder Woman, the emissary from Paradise Island who will accompany Steve back to "Man's World" and aid in the fight against the Axis powers. It was established that all Amazons are adept at a discipline called "bullets and bracelets" in which they can deflect bullets fired at them using the chain bands on their wrists.

It was originally implied, but not yet fully confirmed, that Paradise Island was located somewhere in the Pacific Ocean. In the 1970s television incarnation (as portrayed by Lynda Carter), Paradise Island's location was set in the Bermuda Triangle. A 2009 animated movie version had set it in the Aegean Sea.

Originally, there were three generations of Amazons living on the island, with Princess Diana being from the second.

This basic back-story remains intact throughout the Golden Age and Silver Age of Comic Books, until the 1985–1986 "Crisis on Infinite Earths" storyline. Upon the conclusion of this limited series, most characters in the DC Comics universe underwent some revamp or retcon in their storyline history, and Wonder Woman was one of several characters whose entire continuity was rebooted.

=== Post-Crisis (1987–present) ===
The 1987 relaunch of the Wonder Woman series establishes that the Amazons are the reincarnated souls of women slain throughout pre-history by men. Shaped from clay over 3,000 years previous and given new lives by five Olympian goddesses – Artemis, Athena, Demeter, Hestia, and Aphrodite – the Amazons are granted immortality, great physical strength, highly acute senses, beauty, wisdom, and love for one another. They are tasked to teach the merits of virtue, love, and equality to the men of "Patriarch's World". They have founded the city-state of Themyscira in ancient Greece, which is ruled by sisters Hippolyta and Antiope. Ares, the God of War and a chief opponent of the Amazons, manipulates his half brother Heracles to gather forces and attack Themyscira. Heracles subdues and ravages Hippolyta, and his forces succeed in ransacking Themyscira and making the Amazons their slaves. Hippolyta pleads with the goddesses for help. Athena agrees to aid the Amazons, but only if they do not go against their purpose of creation by seeking revenge. When they agree to her terms, Athena frees the Amazons from their chains. Once freed, however, the Amazons proceed to slaughter most of their captors. Antiope leads a force of Amazons off into Greece, seeking vengeance on Heracles. As decreed by the goddesses, Hippolyta leads the remaining Amazons to a remote island where, as penance for their failures as teachers, they become guardians of Doom's Doorway, preventing the escape of the monsters beneath. Renaming the island paradise Themyscira after their fallen capital, the Amazons began their new lives, erecting buildings and monuments and perfecting their skills as artisans and warriors.

For centuries, the Amazons of Themyscira live in a perfect state of harmony with their surroundings, under a theocracy. They know no racism, although many consider Antiope's Lost Tribe of Amazons as little more than savages. They do not think in terms of male gender; the word "policeman" is alien to them until Diana's departure into the outside world. Homosexuality is completely natural to them – while some Amazons are chaste, others have loving consorts. Their city is composed entirely of Greco-Roman architecture from 1200 BCE, and they wear Greek garb, togas, sandals, and period armor. The Amazons also all wear the Bracelets of Submission as constant reminders of their enslavement and obedience to their patrons, although only Diana can deflect bullets with them. They are fervently religious, worshipping their gods as living deities. Artemis is their primary goddess, and they worship her with a sacrifice of a deer. The Amazons celebrate their creation each year in a Feast of Five, remembering the goddesses who brought them to life.

Occasionally, the Nereides bring to the shores of Themyscira young infants who would have otherwise drowned in accidents. The Amazons of Paradise Island would initiate a process called "send forth", where these infants are tutored spiritually in Amazonian ideals, and they are then sent back mystically to the place of their disappearance scant moments after being lost at sea. Julia Kapatelis, Diana's first friend in Patriarch's World, is one such infant.

Themyscira is presently located in the Bermuda Triangle but possesses the magical ability to teleport to any location or time period its inhabitants desire.

== National timeline ==
=== Turmoil and genocide ===
- Every headline writer who has written volume two of Wonder Woman has depicted Themyscirian slaughter:
  - George Pérez – included Heracles' rape and slaughter of the Amazons, as well as the destruction of the first Bana-Mighdall city.
  - William Messner-Loebs – depicted an Amazon tribal war over Themyscira's ownership.
  - John Byrne – had Darkseid invade Themyscira, kill half the population, and turned the remainder to stone.
  - Phil Jimenez – re-introduced the Amazon tribal war over Themyscira's ownership.
  - Walt Simonson – caused a Hydra to turn the Amazons into stone.
  - Greg Rucka – had OMACs kill over half the remaining Amazon population.
  - Brian Azzarello – had Hera transform all the Amazons into snakes and petrify Hippolyta.
- The island(s) can shift its location over both land and time.

=== Enter Wonder Woman ===
Queen Hippolyta uses the soil of Themyscira to create her daughter Diana; art by Adam Hughes.

In recent times, Hippolyta's daughter Diana, also known as Wonder Woman, has become an ambassador to the outside world. With Diana's help, the Amazons have opened the shores of Themyscira to dignitaries of "Patriarch’s World". The creatures beneath Doom's Doorway were defeated, and for a time the Amazons destroyed their battle armor as a testament to a new period of peace. The Amazons opened up their shores to dignitaries from Patriarch's world, female and male, but that exchange was almost destroyed by Eris, Goddess of Discord. The Amazons even conducted their own tour of the United States, where they were framed for the murders of several people by Antiope's descendants, the mercenary assassins of Bana-Mighdall, and Circe. It was during the "War of the Gods" that the Amazons recrafted their armory, vowing to again become warriors. Circe would transplant many of these mercenary women of Bana-Migdhall, called the Lost Tribe, to Themyscira, where, after warring with the Amazons already there, the two factions joined forces to stop Circe herself. The two sects of Amazons forged an uneasy truce, living at opposite ends of the island.

Professor Julia Kapatelis, a close friend to Wonder Woman and the Amazons, was later presented with a grant by the National Geographic Society to locate the original Greek city of Themyscira. Julia however had to leave the excavation midway through the project once as one of her daughter's friends committed suicide. Whether the original city of Themyscira has been fully excavated or not it has not been shown.

Later still, Darkseid's forces ravaged Themyscira during a search to locate the Greek gods, killing nearly half of the Amazons there in the process. As they began rebuilding, the Amazons found themselves reverting to stone. This was as a result of the gods' departure from the mortal plane, and the Amazons' connection to their creator beings so diminished as to revert their bodies to their primordial state. With the gods returned to Olympus, the Amazons were again transformed into their flesh and blood state, yet more Amazons were killed in a confrontation with Neron.

With Diana and Hippolyta adventuring in Patriarch's World as Wonder Woman for longer and longer periods of time, the Banas and the Themyscirans were manipulated into a bloody civil war at the hands of Magala, who had been possessed by the spirit of Antiope's murderer, Ariadne. Using the pre-existing disdain of the tribes against each other, Magala used allies among both Amazon cities to spark the vengeful conflict. The island was left in ruins, and the war was only stopped when Hippolyta abolished the royal family, renounced her throne.

Left at odds but on even political ground, the Bana Amazons and the Themyscirans joined forces against the forces of Imperiex. Themyscira, mystically moved into outer space, was destroyed, and hundreds of Amazons from both tribes died. When Wonder Woman led each tribe of Amazons into an ecumenical prayer, funneling power into Darkseid, the Amazons helped destroy Imperiex and Brainiac 13.

=== New Themyscira ===
After the island had been destroyed by Imperiex during the "Our Worlds at War" storyline, Themyscira was rebuilt and relocated, this time to the Bermuda Triangle. Adding to the re-creation of the islands, Themyscira was restored by the combined might of the Greek and Egyptian goddesses the Amazons worship. Transformed into a mighty series of floating islands dedicated to the free exchange of information and ideas, the new Themyscira was governed by members of both tribes of Amazons. After some time Themyscira was nearly destroyed in a jealous fit of rage by the goddess Hera, who was angry that Zeus was magically spying on Artemis. Because of her actions the islands ceased to float in mid-air under their own power and instead resumed being a cluster of traditional islands once more.

=== One Year Later ===
Under the direction of the writer Will Pfeifer, the Amazons attack Washington, D.C. as retaliation for the attack on the island in a six-part mini-series titled Amazons Attack!. At the end of the series, the Amazons have their memories erased by Granny Goodness (posing as the goddess Athena) and are scattered throughout the world with false personas. Only Hippolyta and four of her original Royal Guard remain on Themyscira. The Queen is exiled to Themyscira (which had seemingly been sunk and restored during the battle) for her crimes of attacking Man's World, though her actions had been influenced by Circe. Later, Zeus revives the Amazons' memories and provides transport for them to return to Themyscira.

== Flora and fauna ==
=== Pre-Crisis ===
When the Wonder Woman comic book was first introduced, Paradise Island possessed horses, and creatures called kangas – reminiscent of the island country Australia's kangaroos – that the Amazons both rode like mounts.

The kangas were probably a breed of kangaroos which were introduced into the island from Australia via coastal migration, which the Amazons bred them and where they originated from. Diana's kanga was named Jumpa.

There were also smaller rabbit-like creatures wandering Paradise Island.

=== Post-Crisis ===
When the Wonder Woman comic book was revamped and started anew in the mid-1980s this was scrapped and the island only had common game animals such as antelopes, deer, wild boar, bears, lions, and fish, pets such as birds, cats, foxes, dogs, and monkeys, and livestock animals such as horses, donkeys, camels, cattle, water buffalo, sheep such as the European mouflon, goats such as the Kri-kri, and pigs. The only exotic/mythological creatures on the island were more sinister in nature and existed in Doom's Doorway to the underworld, which the Amazons swore to keep trapped and never to escape. In the waters surrounding Themyscira also lived Naiads and in the forests Dryads who played most of their days away, occasionally with the Amazons.

In 1999, when writer Eric Luke took over the Wonder Woman comic book, he had several lost mythical creatures from around the globe take asylum on Themyscira. These creatures consisted of: Chiron the centaur, a white Pegasus, Ladon the dragon, a chimera, and a sphinx.

When writer Phil Jimenez wrote the title in the early 2000s, he had several dinosaurs from the land of Skartaris also take refuge on Themyscira in addition to the reappearance of kangas on the island.

Writer Greg Rucka reintroduced a second Pegasus to serve as Wonder Woman's riding companion, this one black with red eyes. It is assumed he still lives on Themyscira.

In 2003, a flashback story by Matt Wagner called Batman/Superman/Wonder Woman: Trinity has the island defended by sapient giant birds. They are killed in the defense of the Amazons.

The 2007 storyline "Amazons Attack!" depicted the Amazons as having creatures such as giant Stygen wasps and some domesticated Pegasi, large amounts of saddled Chimeras, and three titan-sized ogres.

The "Countdown to Final Crisis" storyline reveals that Themyscira is protected by a school of megalodons.

When writer Gail Simone took over the title, she showed that Hippolyta cared for griffins in the royal stables. She also introduced the island of Thalarion, the home of Gargareans during the "Rise of the Olympian" storyline. The Gargareans own herds of pegasi and winged lions, with their leader Achilles also has a domesticated, monstrous war elephant named Mysia.

== In other media ==
Themyscira as depicted in Superman/Batman: Apocalypse.

=== Television ===
- Paradise Island appears in Wonder Woman (1977).
- Paradise Island appears in the Super Friends franchise.
- Themyscira appears in the DC Animated Universe series Justice League and Justice League Unlimited.
- Paradise Island appears in the Batman: The Brave and the Bold episode "Triumvirate of Terror!".
- Themyscira appears in the Legends of Tomorrow episode "Helen Hunt".
- Themyscira appears in Justice League Action.
- Themyscira appears in the Harley Quinn episode "Bachelorette".
- Themyscira appears in DC Super Hero Girls.
- Themyscira appears in the Titans episode "Souls".

=== Film ===
- Paradise Island appears in Wonder Woman (1974).
- Paradise Island appears in Justice League: The New Frontier.
- Themyscira appears in Wonder Woman (2009).
- Themyscira appears in Superman/Batman: Apocalypse.
- Themyscira appears in DC Super Hero Girls: Hero of the Year.
- Themyscira appears in films set in the DC Extended Universe (DCEU). It's implied to be located in the Eastern Mediterranean and houses one of three Mother Boxes.
- Themyscira appears in Teen Titans Go! To the Movies.
- Themyscira appears in Wonder Woman: Bloodlines.
- Themyscira appears in Space Jam: A New Legacy.

=== Video games ===
- Themyscira appears as a stage in Mortal Kombat vs. DC Universe.
- Themyscira appears in DC Universe Online.
- Themyscira appears as a stage in Scribblenauts Unmasked: A DC Comics Adventure.
- Themyscira appears as a stage in Injustice: Gods Among Us.
- Themyscira appears as a stage in Lego DC Super-Villains.
- Themyscira appears in Roblox.

== Bibliography ==
- Beatty, Scott (November 2003). Wonder Woman: The Ultimate Guide to the Amazon Princess. Dorling Kindersley Publishing. pp. 14–15. ISBN 978-0-7894-9616-4.
