= Children of Ares =

Fictional characters appearing in DC Comics publications and related media

Top to bottom: the post-Crisis Deimos, Eris and Phobos, art by Phil Jimenez based on George Pérez's character designs, 1999.

The Children of Ares are several fictional characters appearing in DC Comics publications and related media, commonly as recurring adversaries of the superhero Wonder Woman. Primarily based on eponymous Greek mythological figures, they are malevolent progeny of Wonder Woman's nemesis, the war god Ares. Three in particular – Deimos, Phobos and Eris – have emerged as enduring characters, appearing in every era of Wonder Woman's comic book adventures since debuting in 1969's Wonder Woman #183. Beginning in the Silver Age of Comic Books, these three characters have often been presented as Ares' principal legates in his campaigns for universal conquest, and have also confronted Wonder Woman on their own, individually as well as with one another, as antagonists independent of their father.

As the narrative continuity of Wonder Woman comics has been adjusted by different writers and artists through the years, various versions of Deimos, Phobos and Eris (with various personalities and physical appearances) have been presented. The trio's longest running incarnation, co-devised by writer Greg Potter and writer/artist George Pérez, was as grim classical deities with gruesome features, clad in fantastical Greco-Roman armor. In DC Comics' current post-Rebirth continuity, they are presented as more human figures with more contemporary personalities.

Several other of Ares' progeny – Eros, Harmonia, Hippolyta "Lyta" Milton and the Crow Children – have featured in the Wonder Woman mythos at various points in its history. Of these, only Eros has spanned multiple continuities, appearing in the Bronze Age, Modern Age, New 52 and post-Rebirth eras. Harmonia, Lyta Milton and the Crow Children are all specific to the post-Crisis period of DC's Modern Age continuity, and have not appeared outside of it.

== Context ==
=== Nomenclature ===
There is no group known as "the Children of Ares" in any DC Comics continuity; the term has never been used as an in-story proper team name, such as "Justice League" or "Suicide Squad". However, during DC's post-Crisis continuity, the trio of Deimos, Phobos and Eris were designated as "Ares' Children" in an illustrated encyclopedic entry by that title in 1999's Wonder Woman Secret Files and Origins #2. Several years later, a similar entry titled "Children of Ares" grouped the same three characters in Wonder Woman: The Ultimate Guide to the Amazon Princess, a Wonder Woman encyclopedia published in 2003 in conjunction with DC Comics. Though Wonder Woman uses the phrase "children of Ares" to address the Crow Children in 2010's Wonder Woman (vol. 3) #41, she is not naming them properly but rather indicating her knowledge of their parentage and fealty.

Mars's Golden Age generals (the antecedents of the Children of Ares) in Wonder Woman #2, art by H.G. Peter, 1942.

=== Golden Age progenitors ===
Though Deimos, Phobos and Eris have functioned as a coterie of generals in service to Ares in Wonder Woman comic books dating back to the Silver Age of Comics, they are, in fact, the second trio characters to do so. The convention began in Golden Age stories written in the 1940s by Wonder Woman creator William Moulton Marston, who penned three other figures to serve as the chief operatives of the war god: the Duke of Deception, Lord/Count Conquest and the Earl of Greed. A fourth figure, General Destruction, makes a single background appearance as Mars' aide-de-camp in Wonder Woman #2, but is never seen again.

The Duke of Deception would strike out on his own to become one of Wonder Woman's principal mid-century foes, though Lord/Count Conquest and the Earl of Greed would reappear to complete the triumvirate for minor appearances in both the Silver and Bronze Ages.

== Deimos and Phobos ==
Deimos and Phobos
- Deimos (left) and Phobos (right) in Wonder Woman (vol. 2) #2, September 1986; art by George Pérez.

Publication information
- Publisher: DC Comics
- First appearance: Wonder Woman #183 (July 1969)
- Created by: Mike Sekowsky

In-story information
- Species: Olympian Gods
- Partnerships: Deimos: Followers of the House of Deimos Phobos: Decay, Euryale, Ixion the Assassin Both: Ares, Eris, Eros, Hera
- Abilities: Deimos: Mind control; Prehensile hair, beard and tail made of snakes can trap and strangle enemies; Snake venom sparks terror in victims; Can psychically instill violent terror in crowds; Phobos: Ability to manifest deadly concrete avatars of victims' greatest fears; Can psychically inspire fear and dismay in crowds; Hands and topknot smolder with destructive godly energy; Both: Immortality; Invulnerability; Godly strength, speed and stamina

Deimos is based on the eponymous Greek mythological god of terror and Phobos on the eponymous god of fear. They are brothers, both sons to Ares and Aphrodite, and have been paired as a collaborative duo for most of their DC Comics appearances. Since 2017, they have been presented as identical twins, always in one another's company.

This Deimos is a distinct character from the villain of the same name.

=== Publication history ===
==== Silver Age ====
The Silver Age Deimos (back) and Phobos (front) in Wonder Woman #183 (1969), art by Mike Sekowsky.

Deimos and Phobos debuted in a Silver Age story written and illustrated by Mike Sekowsky in 1969's Wonder Woman #183. Aiding their father (who was then known in DC Comics' continuity as "Mars") alongside Eris (presented here as their aunt) the brothers led a powerful demonic army known as the "Beast Men" in a bid to conquer the Amazons of Paradise Island and extract from them their secret of interdimensional travel. Attired in Greco-Roman robes and bearing human features, the somewhat sinister looking pair served as Mars' battlefield proxies. The brothers would make a reprise appearance in 1972's Wonder Woman #198.

==== Modern Age: post-Crisis on Infinite Earths ====
After DC Comics rebooted its continuity in 1985 (in a publication event known as the Crisis on Infinite Earths), Wonder Woman, her supporting characters and many of her foes were re-imagined and reintroduced. Deimos and Phobos were among the first of the hero's adversaries to be updated for her post-Crisis adventures, appearing in revamped forms in 1986's Wonder Woman (vol. 2) #2, written by George Pérez and Greg Potter, and illustrated by Pérez. Designed with grotesque physical appearances, and possessing more defined personalities than their Silver Age incarnations, the Modern Age Deimos and Phobos posed a more menacing threat to Wonder Woman and her allies than in the prior continuity. Strategizing at Ares' hest from the war god's other-dimensional stronghold of Areopagus, the snake-bearded Deimos was presented as coolly calculating, while the hulking, troll-like Phobos was rash, petty and deceitful. Phobos' jealous desire to win the approval of his father led him to create the nightmarish demon Decay, one of the first overt threats the Post-Crisis Wonder Woman faced after leaving her home on the island of Themyscira.

Though Phobos' personality was that of an insecure and scheming malcontent, he would prove to be the brother with more initiative, and the character with more staying power. Though Deimos was apparently killed in battle by Wonder Woman in Wonder Woman (vol. 2) #5, Phobos would survive and go on to make multiple appearances as a foil for the hero. He returned in 1988's Wonder Woman (vol. 2) #23-24 with the Gorgon Euryale and the colossal Ixion the Assassin as his accomplices, only to be defeated by Wonder Woman and the Olympian god Hermes. Resurfacing again as a key figure in DC Comics' 1992 company-wide crossover event The War of the Gods, Phobos this time allied himself with Eris (who, in the Post-Crisis continuity, is presented as his sister) and the sorceress Circe in a treacherous plot to kill Ares. He would return yet again in 2000's "Gods of Gotham" storyline in Wonder Woman (vol. 2) #164-167, reunited with the whole of his malevolent family: a resurrected Deimos, Eris and Ares, to battle not only Wonder Woman, but Batman, Wonder Girls Donna Troy and Cassie Sandsmark, Nightwing, Robin Tim Drake, the Huntress, Artemis and Oracle. Here Phobos would again come to the fore as a vexingly deceitful figure, betraying his siblings and father by possessing Batman's body and becoming an all-powerful fear deity. He was only defeated by the combined might of the Wonder Woman and Batman families, as well as Ares himself.

==== Modern Age: DC Rebirth ====
The Rebirth Deimos and Phobos in Wonder Woman vol. 5 #16 (2017), art by Bilquis Evely.

In 2017, as part of DC Comics' Rebirth continuity reboot, new versions of Deimos and Phobos were introduced to the Wonder Woman mythos by writer Greg Rucka in Wonder Woman (vol. 5) #16. Now identical red-haired twins dressed as steampunk dandies, the airish pair blackmail pharmaceutical tycoon Veronica Cale into helping them locate the hidden island of Themyscira, where their father Ares is imprisoned by the Amazons. Presented as elevated, patronizing and smilingly cruel, this Deimos and Phobos also precipitate the circumstances that turn Cale's best friend Dr. Adrianna Anderson into the post-Rebirth Doctor Cyber. However, Cale and Cyber turn the tables on Deimos and Phobos, enlisting the sorceress Circe to transform the twins into doberman pinschers, whom Cale subsequently keeps as pets and guard dogs.

The twins are eventually freed from their canine forms and reappear, this time as key figures in the origin of the Rebirth-era Wonder Girl, Yara Flor in several issues of Joëlle Jones' 2021-2022 series Wonder Girl (vol. 2). Clad in shadowy Greco-Roman helmets and armor, they assist their brother Eros in murdering Yara's mother Aella. They later appear as power-brokers for their grandmother Hera in Wonder Woman #787-790, assisting Doctor Psycho in forming a new incarnation of Villainy Inc.

== Eris ==
Eris
- Eris clutches a Golden Apple of Discord in Wonder Woman (vol. 2) #37, illustrated by Lee Moder and Chris Marrinan, based on George Pérez's character design.

Publication information
- Publisher: DC Comics
- First appearance: Wonder Woman #183 (July 1969)
- Created by: Mike Sekowsky

In-story information
- Species: Olympian Gods
- Partnerships: Ares, Deimos, Phobos, Maxie Zeus
- Notable aliases: Strife
- Abilities: Golden Apples of Discord create suspicion, mistrust and spite in those who eat them; Mastery of manipulation and deceitful strategy; Immortality; Invulnerability; Godly strength, speed and stamina; Ability to grow to a giant's size; Legs smolder with destructive godly energy

Eris is based on the eponymous Greek mythological goddess of strife and discord. Her familial relationship to Ares has varied as DC Comics continuities have shifted and evolved, but she has been consistently portrayed as having a strong, if complicated, association with him. She was presented as his sister in her Silver Age debut, however beginning in 1989 with her post-Crisis reformulation and continuing into subsequent continuities, she is portrayed also as his daughter. Presumably the result of an incestuous union between Ares and his mother Hera, Eris is the monstrous half-sister of Deimos and Phobos. She wields the Golden Apples of Discord, powerful magical toxicants that can corrupt the minds and emotions of her victims, and undermine events and relationships. She is a master of manipulation, capable of subtly maneuvering others toward extremely destructive actions.

=== Publication history ===
==== Silver Age ====
Like Deimos and Phobos, Eris debuted in 1969's Wonder Woman #183. A sorceress in violet armor with a formfitting black wimple and cloak, she aids Mars in an attempt to conquer the Amazons of Paradise Island. At his behest, she casts an ancient spell on Queen Hippolyta, cursing her into a tortured coma from which she could not be awakened. She would reprise this appearance several years later in 1972's Wonder Woman #198.

==== Modern Age: post-Crisis on Infinite Earths ====
Eris made her first post-Crisis appearance in 1989's Wonder Woman (vol. 2) #37 and served as the principal antagonist in a four-issue story arc co-written by George Pérez, William Messner-Loebs and Mindy Newell. Designed by Pérez as an imposing female figure in blue Greco-Roman armor, the post-Crisis Eris bears more than a passing visual resemblance to her father Ares, and is presented as the antithesis of her benevolent half-sister Harmonia. With a mane of slate-colored hair and shadowy skin (rendered by different colorists at different times as dark gray, pitch black or deep crimson), this Eris is a dour and imperious deity who manipulates events from beneath the tree of the Golden Apples of Discord, located in a night-shrouded nether-realm. When Wonder Woman's mother Queen Hippolyta agrees to open the island nation of Themyscira to the outside world, Eris uses her cursed Golden Apples to sabotage its first diplomatic summit with the United Nations. Journalist Lois Lane, covering the summit for the Daily Planet, deduces Eris' plot and rescues Wonder Woman, who has fallen under the goddess' thrall. Together, the two are able to defeat Eris, and though the ordeal severely damages Themyscira's burgeoning international reputation, Wonder Woman and Lois succeed in forming a newfound mutual friendship.

Eris resurfaces several years later as a key figure in DC Comics' 1992 company-wide crossover event The War of the Gods. Alongside her brother Phobos, she allies with the sorceress Circe in a cataclysmic assault to conquer the world's pantheons. When multiple mythological superheroes converge to confront Circe in a final battle, Eris is seemingly killed by the Son of Vulcan, breaking her malevolent influence on the situation and turning the tide of the war. She would return in 2000's Wonder Woman (vol. 2) #164, reunited with a resurrected Ares, Deimos and Phobos, in a gambit to merge Gotham City with Ares' other-dimensional stronghold of Areopagus. Possessing the body of Poison Ivy, Eris channels the villain's florakinetic power into her Golden Apples of Discord. She uses the apples to manipulate the disturbed Gotham crime-boss Maxie Zeus into leading a cult of worshippers, whose devotion further fuels her discordian power. Betrayed by Phobos, who possesses Batman's body and becomes an all-powerful fear deity, Eris joins with Ares, and the Wonder Woman and Batman families, to defeat her brother.

The New 52 Eris/Strife on the cover of Wonder Woman vol. 4 #11 (2012), designed and illustrated by Cliff Chiang.

==== Modern Age: The New 52 and DC Rebirth ====
In 2011, DC Comics once again rebooted its narrative continuity with The New 52, a company-wide publishing event reintroducing its characters with new origins, circumstances and characterizations. The Wonder Woman mythos was revamped by writer Brian Azzarello and artist Cliff Chiang in what was to be a controversial three-year run of the hero's monthly title. Azzarello and Chiang dramatically reworked many of the Greek deities populating Wonder Woman's adventures, both visually and characterologically. Though most of these changes were undone by writer Greg Rucka several years later as part of DC Rebirth (yet another continuity reboot), Azzarello and Chiang's version of Eris has endured.

In the form of a lean young woman with a shaved head, clad in a slashed little black cocktail dress, Eris – primarily known in New 52 stories as Strife – would emerge as one of the most popular characters of Azzarello and Chiang's run on Wonder Woman. Presented as both languid and blithe, with a cutting sense of humor, this version stands in stark contrast to the stoic Eris of the post-Crisis era. Often lounging with a cocktail in one hand, the pale Strife first appeared as an agent of her mother Hera, and almost always served as comic relief, particularly playing off the more serious-minded Wonder Woman. However, by the end of Azzarello and Chiang's run, it became clear that Strife was no mere comic device, but rather the grand architect of all the travails faced by Wonder Woman and her allies throughout the preceding three-year story arc.

== Eros ==
Eros
- The Rebirth-era Eros in Wonder Girl (vol. 2) #3, illustrated by Joëlle Jones, 2021.

Publication information
- Publisher: DC Comics
- First appearance: DC Comics Presents #32 (April 1981)
- Created by: Jerry Conway and Kurt Schaffenberger

In-story information
- Species: Olympian Gods
- Partnerships: Hera, Ares, Deimos, Phobos
- Notable aliases: Steve Howard
- Abilities: Master archer and marksman; Magical arrows/bullets do not wound, but induce powerful feelings of attraction and romantic love; Immortality; Invulnerability; Godly strength, speed and stamina; Flight; Ability to grow to a giant's size

=== Publication history ===
==== Bronze Age ====
Eros is based on the eponymous Greek mythological god of desire, sex and romantic love, the son of Ares and Aphrodite. Though he technically did not appear before the Bronze Age of Comics, he would come to have a complex significance to the Wonder Woman mythos reaching back into the Silver Age. Eros's first full appearance was in "The Super-Prisoners of Love", the lead story in 1981's DC Comics Presents #32, written by Gerry Conway and Roy Thomas and illustrated by Kurt Schaffenberger. He is depicted as a handsome winged figure in a white toga, armed with a bright pink bow and a quiver of bright pink arrows. In the story, Eros suddenly materializes before Wonder Woman and, somewhat inexplicably, professes his undying love for her, sowing mayhem along the way. The crisis is eventually resolved by Wonder Woman and Superman, with some key assistance from Eros's mother Aphrodite. Though a standalone story, "The Super-Prisoners of Love" provided a narrative spark for a set of retcons involving Eros and Wonder Woman's romantic interest Steve Trevor that would begin to unfold several years later in 1984's Wonder Woman #320, written by Dan Mishkin.

The Bronze Age Eros in DC Comics Presents #32 (1981), illustrated by Kurt Schaffenberger.

Mishkin sought to clarify almost 15 years of narrative murkiness surrounding the character of Steve Trevor. Trevor was apparently killed by the villainous Doctor Cyber at the onset of the "mod era" of Wonder Woman's adventures, beginning with 1968's Wonder Woman #178. He would later be resurrected, killed again, and re-resurrected in a series of convoluted mid-1970s stories by several different writers, resulting in multiple DC Comics continuity paradoxes. To resolve these inconsistencies, Mishkin devised a theretofore-untold backstory in which Queen Hippolyta and Aphrodite engineer Trevor's first resurrection by grafting his mortal body to Eros's soul – without the knowledge of Wonder Woman, Trevor, or even Eros himself. As a result, the Trevor/Eros composite (known primarily during this period as "Steve Howard") functioned in the same romantic capacity that Steve Trevor always had, until being killed by a demonic entity known as the Dark Commander in 1978's Wonder Woman #248. As a result of the retcon, Eros's first comic book appearance was now technically as Steve Howard in 1976's Wonder Woman #248, written by Martin Pasko. Upon Steve Howard's death, Eros resumed his Olympian form with no recollection of his time in Trevor's body, save a vestigial sense of the romantic love Trevor had always born Wonder Woman. According to the logic of the retcon, it was this residual love that prompted Eros's otherwise out-of-the-blue pursuit of Wonder Woman in DC Comics Presents #32.

As he learned of his violation at the hands of Queen Hippolyta and his mother Aphrodite, Eros became increasingly unstable, apparently killing Doctor Cyber (who had herself killed Steve Trevor years earlier in the Silver Age), and almost destroying Paradise Island before being intercepted by Paula von Gunther. Von Gunther used Amazon technology to purge Eros's madness and return him to sanity.

==== Modern Age: post-Crisis on Infinite Earths ====
Eros made his first post-Crisis appearance in 1987's Wonder Woman (vol. 2) #7, along with several other members of the ancient Greek pantheon, including Dionysus, Morpheus and Pan. His visual depiction here is similar to that of his Bronze Age incarnation, though as drawn by artist George Pérez, the early post-Crisis Eros is a bit younger and a bit more muscular. He would reappear several months later in issue #11, and then fade from view for 17 years, until writer Greg Rucka introduced an updated Greek pantheon beginning in Wonder Woman (vol. 2) #196. Now dressed in more modern garb with more contemporary personalities, many of the deities of Olympus are presented as "changing with the times". As such, Eros is now styled as a teenaged "slacker" with dark sunglasses and blonde dreadlocks.

He is enlisted by his father Ares in a plot to overthrow Zeus from the Olympian throne. However, the task Ares gives his son – to pierce Zeus's heart with a lust arrow – has unforeseen consequences. In a fit of rage, Zeus's wife Hera causes a cataclysm that nearly destroys Themyscira when she finds her lovestruck husband ogling the Amazon Artemis.

The New 52 Eros in Wonder Woman (vol. 4) #7, illustrated by Cliff Chiang, 2012.

==== Modern Age: The New 52 ====
In 2011, DC's New 52 reboot saw Eros reimagined along with the rest of the gods of Olympus by writer Brian Azzarello and artist Cliff Chiang. Still a handsome young man, this Eros wears fashionable contemporary clothing and, instead of his traditional bow and arrow, carries a pair of solid gold Glock 17 handguns which fire magical "love bullets". A somewhat prickly ally, Eros serves as a liaison between Wonder Woman and other Olympian gods, brokering a meeting with Hephaestus, and also helping her plan the rescue of her friend Zola from Hades, the ruler of the underworld. Eros even lends Wonder Woman his golden handguns for the Hades mission. He later stands with Wonder Woman and her allies in a final battle to defend Mount Olympus from the First Born.

== Harmonia ==
Harmonia
- Harmonia in Wonder Woman (vol. 2) #45, illustrated by Jill Thompson, 1990.

Publication information
- Publisher: DC Comics
- First appearance: Wonder Woman (vol. 2) #2, March 1987
- Created by: George Pérez and Greg Potter

In-story information
- Species: Olympian Gods
- Partnerships: Son of Vulcan
- Abilities: Amulet of Harmonia can imprison wicked entities, establish spiritual concord between individuals, ease language barriers, and restore cosmic balance when halves are joined; Ability to perceive hidden imbalance in situations and people; Teleportation, including access to planes unreachable to other deities, such as Tartarus and the realm of the Fates; Flight; Ability to transform into animals; Immortality

Harmonia is based on the eponymous Greek mythological goddess of harmony and balance; she appears only during the post-Crisis era of DC Comics' Modern Age continuities. Unlike most of her siblings, she is a benevolent deity who serves as a guide and ally for Wonder Woman. She possesses the Amulet of Harmonia, a powerful cosmic artifact crafted by Hephaestus and gifted her by the ancient Greek hero Cadmus. An intricate red disk with two identical joined halves, the Amulet controls universal energies of equilibrium and parity. It guides its holder toward actions that achieve balanced outcomes, and can correct discord by imprisoning evil entities. It has the ability to magically broker spiritual concord between individuals, as well as dissolve misunderstandings by easing linguistic barriers. When its two halves are joined, it remedies cosmic imbalance.

The daughter of Ares and Aphrodite, Harmonia is presented as the antithesis of her wicked half-sister Eris. She becomes the patron and lover of Halciber Filius, the so-called Son of Vulcan, a heroic champion granted godly powers by the Roman aspects of DC Comics' Olympian pantheon.

=== Modern Age: post-Crisis on Infinite Earths ===
Top: Harmonia's first appearance in Wonder Woman (vol. 2) #2, illustrated by George Pérez, 1986. Bottom: Wonder Woman holds the Amulet of Harmonia in Wonder Woman (vol. 2) #3, illustrated by George Pérez, 1987.

Though in almost all of Harmonia's appearances, she is depicted as a bejeweled classical goddess in a flowing light blue gown, her debut in 1987's Wonder Woman (vol. 2) #2 introduced a very different-looking deity. When Wonder Woman first encounters her in Ares' extradimensional stronghold of Areopagus, Harmonia is a wailing crone in filthy bandages, wearing a green hooded cloak. She explains to Wonder Woman that Ares magically disfigured her because he resented her original resemblance to her beautiful mother Aphrodite. To aid Wonder Woman in stopping Ares from carrying out an apocalyptic plan, the anguished goddess gives the hero half of her Amulet of Harmonia. Noting that it will seek out its other half, which had been stolen by Ares, Harmonia warns Wonder Woman to proceed carefully, because the Amulet is a talisman of almost limitless cosmic power.

Wonder Woman subsequently uses the Amulet to form a mystical bond with one of her most significant post-Crisis allies, the historian and archeologist Julia Kapetelis. During their first meeting, when both Wonder Woman and Kapetelis simultaneously touch the Amulet, a magical event is triggered that aligns the two women in spiritual harmony, and grants them the ability to better communicate with one another, even across their shared language barrier.

In Wonder Woman (vol. 2) #11, Harmonia transforms herself into a vulture to guide Wonder Woman's mother Queen Hippolyta on a quest to retrieve her daughter from the depths of Tartarus. Once mother and daughter are reunited several issues later, Harmonia reveals that Ares' curse on her is broken and that she has been transformed back into her original form, an ethereal, sparkling beauty with pale peach-colored hair. After Wonder Woman uses the Amulet of Harmonia to imprison all of the evils in Tartarus, the artifact is returned to the goddess.

Harmonia returns several years later as a key figure in DC Comics' 1992 company-wide crossover event The War of the Gods. With the cryptic help of the Fates, she deduces that the sorceress Circe has allied with her brother Phobos and her half-sister Eris in a plot for divine conquest that would destroy the Earth and overthrow Mount Olympus. Cast into Tartarus before being able to warn Wonder Woman or the other Olympian gods, Harmonia encounters Halciber Filius, the Son of Vulcan. Choosing him as her champion (and falling in love along the way), she joins with a battalion of mythologically-powered superheroes to confront Circe and her siblings in a final battle. In the ensuing melee, Harmonia is apparently murdered by Phobos, while the Son of Vulcan makes one final gesture of balance on his fallen love's behalf – executing Harmonia's opposite, Eris.

== Other of Ares' Progeny ==
=== Hippolyta "Lyta" Milton ===
Hippolyta "Lyta" Milton is the biological daughter of Ares and Circe, who hid herself under the identity of a mortal named Donna Milton. As Wonder Woman's Lasso of Truth could see through any disguise, Circe cast a spell on herself to truly believe she was Donna until an opportune moment presented itself where she could destroy the Amazon. As Donna Milton she believed herself to be a lawyer working for a Boston crime boss named Ares Buchanan. Unbeknownst to Donna, Ares Buchanan was really the Olympian god Ares in disguise as well. The two formed a sexual relationship once she agreed to help Ares defeat Wonder Woman, who was interrupting his illegal business dealings. After becoming pregnant Donna informed Ares that she was going to have his child. Ares showed Donna that he wasn't interested in fatherhood by shooting Donna in the chest. Because of a weapon used shortly thereafter, a mini-black hole was created that seemingly destroyed Ares and caused the building to fall on top of Donna and Wonder Woman. They fell through to the sewers below and landed in a huge underwater pool. The shock of the shooting and the black hole caused Donna to go into premature labor. Wonder Woman helped calm Donna and deliver her baby.

Ashamed that she previously aided Ares in destroying Wonder Woman after sacrificing her own life to save her, Donna named her newborn daughter after Wonder Woman's mother Hippolyta, or "Lyta". Wonder Woman helped to get Donna back on her feet so that she could properly care for Lyta by hiring her to be the company lawyer for a detective agency she and friend Micah Rains newly established. This arrangement worked nicely for some time until Wonder Woman was able to discover that Donna was really Circe. Once this happened, Lyta's blonde hair and blue eyes changed to resemble more of her mother's features: purple hair and purple/red eyes. Reclaiming her true identity and angered that she would allow herself to become a close friend of Wonder Woman, albeit in a different persona, Circe took to attacking Wonder Woman more frequently. During each attack, Circe had Lyta present in an attempt to indoctrinate her with hatred and arrogance. To this end Circe allied herself with many evil and ruthless villains such as Sebastian Ballesteros, Lex Luthor, Doctor Psycho, and the Silver Swan.

Despite being surrounded by unsavory characters at such a young age, Lyta's personality remained sweet and friendly. She even took to waving hello to Wonder Woman when she would see her. On one occasion, Circe had Lyta hide in the shadows and watch as Circe and Wonder Woman beat each other mercilessly. Confused and frightened for her mother's welfare, Lyta began crying and ran to her mother's side for comfort. Circe was furious with Lyta for ignoring her instructions to stay hidden but Wonder Woman verbally chastised Circe to see the situation for what it was: a moment when her child needed her to be a true role-model and to comfort her child. Circe grudgingly agreed and disappeared while holding Lyta, telling her everything is going to be okay.

When Wonder Woman's homeland of Themyscira was revamped to include a rehabilitation island for prisoners, Circe is captured and held there. So that she could not use her magics to escape she is surrounded by plantings of moly, which is the one substance that nullifies Circe's sorceries. Lyta is then taken to be raised on the main island along with many orphaned children. Though Lyta has trouble bonding with the other girls, she does become quite close to several Amazons and takes pleasure in being trained in the Amazon way. After the Amazon Io teaches Lyta how to properly respect the god Poseidon and his domain, Lyta's father Ares appears. He incapacitates Io and takes Lyta back to his realm. When Circe learns what has happened, she escapes her prison and confronts Ares. Ares tells Circe that the time of the gods is at a crossroads and that drastic measures needed to be taken. Circe agrees to join Ares as his consort, making them new co-rulers of the Underworld. Thus, Lyta continued to be cared for by both of her parents, reunited.

=== The Crow Children ===
Created by Gail Simone and Bernard Chang and first appearing in Wonder Woman (vol. 3) #39, the five begotten children of Ares and the Amazons came to being when the God of War had also magically impregnated five Amazons at some point in the past, and the offspring of these unholy unions were named Adder, Goat, Rat, Scorpion and Spider. A civil war situation arose on Themyscira, overshadowing the pregnancies, the mothers reached term abnormally quickly and were mystically summoned to a forgotten court by the ghost of Ares. This long abandoned place had been built millennia before just in case children were ever born on Themyscira. Ares further summoned animals infused by his essence. After the five Amazons gave birth against their will, they were magically forced into an eternal sleep. The infants were raised by the magically corrupted animals, and grew up at an accelerated rate. Thus mere months later the five brothers, looking to be about seven years old and having about thrice the maturity, were sent out in the world to turn it against Wonder Woman and the Amazons.

The boys have a supernatural ability to influence those around them, overriding their mind with thoughts of violence, hatred, war and guilt. They can easily trigger riots and incite large crowds to deadly violence. By focusing this ability on a single person they can take direct control, even against persons with a strong personality such as Etta Candy, Steve Trevor or Power Girl. The Crow Children act by talking, though it's clearly not normal social interaction - their words have an impossibly convincing effect when it comes to seeding hatred, resentment, envy, defiance and the like. Victims will even experience mild hallucination as a result of dissonance, for instance perceiving a trusted ally as demonically deformed to try to reconcile the words of the Crow Children about that person with reality.

The five brothers, wearing a sort of school uniform with cap emblazoned with a crow symbol, strolled through Washington D.C., where Wonder Woman then lived. Using supernatural influence they fanned the flames of intolerance, envy, petty hatred and bloodlust. They both attacked Wonder Woman's reputation and the civil peace in the capital, triggering murders, arson and eventually riot. When the mighty heroine Power Girl responded, the Crow Children were delighted, taking over her mind and turning her against Wonder Woman.

The five half-brothers affected a style and speech patterns well beyond their apparent years. They act more like they are highly educated, mannered and articulate, with an emphasis on what is proper and how society should behave. They constantly use sarcasm, denouncing violence, improper behaviour and the lack of morality of modern society, while fully knowing that they are the direct cause for the chaos and hatred that surround them. They seemingly appear very sheltered and innocent, but this behaviour is not authentic, just a performance and a tool of manipulation.

The boys ended up being defeated by Wonder Woman who used her Lasso of Truth to see through their illusions. Instead of the planned conclusion to the story, in which the boys turned into demonic versions of their animal spirits, causing further havoc in the streets, the issue ended anticlimactically with Wonder Woman spanking them. The original planned ending alludes to them being able to transform into animalistic demons.

== In other media ==
- Deimos appears in Wonder Woman (2009), voiced by John DiMaggio. This version has a beard made of snakes. He is defeated by Wonder Woman, but commits suicide by having one of the snakes bite him.
- Eris appears in the Harley Quinn episode "Bachelorette", voiced by Jameela Jamil. This version is the manager of a resort on Themyscira.

== See also ==
- List of Wonder Woman enemies
