= Poseidon (DC Comics) =

Publication information
- Publisher: DC Comics
- First appearance: Flash Comics #9 (September 1940)
- Created by: George Pérez (writer/artist)

In-story information
- Place of origin: Mount Olympus
- Team affiliations: Olympian Gods
- Notable aliases: Neptune
- Abilities: Deity, vast supernatural abilities including size-changing, shapeshifting, immortality, and command of the sea and all sea life

Poseidon is a fictional deity from the DC Comics world who is based on the Greek god of the same name and the uncle of Wonder Woman. Having the status as Greek god of the sea, the character has figured primarily in stories relating to two of DC Comics' main superhero properties: Wonder Woman (an Amazonian-Olympian warrior with various connections to the Greek pantheon) and Aquaman (the king of the underwater city of Atlantis).

== Publication history ==
Poseidon first appears in Flash Comics #9 and was adapted by George Pérez.

== Fictional character biography ==
Poseidon's history in Greek mythology is the same in the DC Comics universe, including the fact that he's the brother of Zeus and Hades.

When the Amazons freed themselves from enslavement arranged in part by Ares, the founding Goddesses of that people received the help of Poseidon, who had a deep grievance against the war god, to get the Amazons to safety by parting the sea waters to create a path to the island of Themyscira.

When Hawkman was fighting the undersea creatures called the Kogats, he received help from Poseidon who helped to destroy them.

With the help of Proteus, Poseidon sees into the future where he takes an interest in Mera and plans to make her his wife. Proteus provides Poseidon with "time pods" that allow him to travel back and forth in time. When Poseidon abducts Mera, Aquaman steals one of the Olympian's time pods and follows him. Zeus proposes a contest to retrieve a golden apple beneath the sea, with Mera going to the winner. Despite Poseidon's cheating, Aquaman manages to win the contest. Angered, Poseidon takes Mera and flees to Aquaman's time. Aquaman and Aqualad follow with the help of Zeus and save both Mera and Poseidon from a berserk creature created by Mera. Poseidon vows to mend his ways, and Aquaman gives him a pod with which he can travel back to his normal era.

After Ares was defeated by Wonder Woman, Poseidon was with the Gods when they rejoiced. With Wonder Woman dying from the wounds she sustained in her fight against Ares, Zeus orders Poseidon to take Wonder Woman underwater to heal her.

Zeus, Hades, and Poseidon meet atop the corpse of their father and revise their pact. They will join forces to build a new Olympus.

After Aquaman had defeated Poseidon's son Triton in combat, Poseidon decrees that the humiliation of a God is something to which no mortal should ever play witness. As punishment, Poseidon blinds Aquaman. Aquaman tells Poseidon to go to Hell, but Poseidon merely laughs at him and disappears.

=== The New 52 ===
In The New 52 reboot of DC's continuity, Poseidon is reintroduced when Wonder Woman arrives at the Thames River in order to gain an audience with him. Poseidon appears to Wonder Woman in the form of a massive, furry, tentacled frog. Poseidon senses Zeus' blood in Diana and warns her that her heritage has no meaning with Zeus' death, and demands that she step aside. Acknowledging Poseidon's claim to the heavens, Diana warns that Hera has already claimed them as her own. Poseidon is angered, lifting her up by the neck as citizens watch in horror from the bridge. Poseidon is skeptical that Hera hopes to gain control over all of Olympus. If it is true, he will make her kneel to him. The world was split between the three brothers - sea, heavens, and hell. The rest were scraps left to the other gods. Now, he has the power to destroy those scraps or leave them be. It will be up to the others to decide which they want. Without a king, he says, Hera has nothing. Wonder Woman is not making much progress with her bargain to Poseidon as he swats her up onto the London Bridge. When Lennox and Hades arrive at where Wonder Woman and Poseidon are, Wonder Woman makes her proposal: that Olympus could be ruled by the sea by day and the underworld by night, all while sharing a queen. Poseidon finds the deal laughable. Just then, the group is approached by Hera. Poseidon is amused by the fact that Hera played him and Hades as fools. Poseidon regards this as a mistake that will not be made again, swallowing the First Born whole.

The First Born later confronts Poseidon who regrets Zeus' decision to let the First Born live. Within the belly of Poseidon, the First Born and Cassandra find their way to Poseidon's true home where Poseidon offers him a deal. He will return the First Born's weapon and allow him to overtake Mount Olympus in exchange for leaving the sea and the Underworld to its current rulers. Naturally, the First Born refuses. Poseidon warns that if the First Born kills him there, he will forever be trapped within the god's corpse. As such, it behooves him to make a deal. The deal will be sealed in blood, and the First Born slits his finger, and mingles his blood with Poseidon's own. With the deal made, Poseidon warns that the ruler of Olympus is now Apollo. After letting the First Born on his way, Poseidon and Hades note that the two enemies the First Born faces are formidable. They hope that one will be destroyed by him, while the other will destroy him. While on Mount Olympus, Apollo is looking at his reflection until it is interrupted by Poseidon who mocks Apollo's claim.

== Powers and abilities ==
Like the other Olympian Gods, Poseidon possesses super-strength, super-speed, shapeshifting, immortality, and invulnerability.

Poseidon can control the seas and all life that dwells within them.

== In other media ==
- Poseidon appears in flashbacks depicted in the Justice League episode "The Terror Beyond". In Atlantis' ancient past, he battled demons called the "Old Ones" before gathering all of Earth's mystical energy into his trident to force the Old Ones far from Earth, at the cost of Atlantis sinking into the ocean.
- Poseidon appears in flashbacks depicted in Wonder Woman, in which he is killed by Ares.
