= Olympian Gods (DC Comics) =

DC characters

Publication information
- Publisher: DC Comics
- First appearance: All Star Comics #8 (October 1941)
- Created by: William Moulton Marston; H. G. Peter

Characteristics
- Pantheon: Greco-Roman
- Inherent abilities: Divine powers that usually include: immortality, strength, resistance, speed, agility, invulnerability, mastery of magic, energy control, shape and size change

The Olympian Gods are fictional characters, a race of fictional deities. They are the fictional deities from Greek pantheon in the world of DC Comics, based upon classical mythology and they appear primarily in Wonder Woman, Captain Marvel, and Aquaman comics.

== History ==
=== New era ===
The Olympian gods on the cover of Wonder Woman (vol. 2) #7. Art by George Pérez.

When a Godwave spilled forth from the creation of the Fourth World, the Earth was seeded with great power. It first manifested in the form of old gods, then of metahumans. Some of the oldest of these gods were hidden from the universe until the time of ancient Greece by the sorceress, Hecate. Hecate reasoned that the Olympian Gods (as they would eventually be called) were greatly weakened after usurping power from their father Cronus and the Titans of Myth. She feared that other powerful gods in the universe (notably Darkseid of Apokolips) would seize Earth for himself. Because of Hecate's enchantment, Darkseid wrongly believed that he and the other New Gods pre-dated the Olympians.

One day, the young Uxas of Apokolips came to Rome. There he spread tales of the great Olympian gods. Their following grew tremendously in Rome and so they created avatars of themselves; they were worshipped under different names. Uxas knew that each half of the pantheon would be less powerful than the original gods. Later as the alien dark and demon god Darkseid, Uxas would use this knowledge to crush Zeus himself.

Centuries ago, an argument between Aphrodite and Ares led to the creation of the Amazons, who have been guided and protected by the goddesses ever since. Ares' recent schemes to destroy the Amazons and his fellow gods led to an Amazon champion being chosen. This champion was Princess Diana, daughter of Queen Hippolyta, whom Hermes escorted to Man's World. There she was called Wonder Woman. Hephaestus forged Wonder Woman's golden Lasso of Truth from the girdle of the earth-goddess Gaea, and her silver bracelets which he formed from the splintered Aegis of Zeus. While the Olympian gods were her patrons, other gods were her foes. Ares and his progeny, Deimos and Phobos, quickly set about challenging the princess in her quest. Phobos created the creature Decay from the "heart of the Gorgon", which Diana quickly dispatched. Meanwhile, Deimos recruited humans on opposing sides, inciting them to war.

Ares' daughter, Harmonia, chose to help Diana, however. She gave her a powerful amulet with the power to transport across dimensions. Diana slew Deimos with her razor-sharp tiara, and from him acquired the other half of Harmonia's amulet. Finally, Ares stepped in to claim the talisman, but Diana bound him with her lasso of truth. He realized that to allow humans to war would leave no kingdom for him to rule. In failure, Ares declared that he would no longer trifle with the affairs of man, and also forbade his offspring from appearing on Earth. He also took the amulet and all the power which had been collected therein.

In defeating Ares, Diana was greatly injured. The gods were so pleased with her that they took her into the sea and healed her. Then, Hermes gave her winged sandals which would enable her to travel freely between Themyscira and Man's World. At some point, the god Pan was killed and replaced by a Manhunter android. It was this impostor who began a feud among the gods. The feud began when Zeus turned an amorous eye towards Diana, offering to make her a goddess if she participated in 'the ultimate sharing of the flesh'. When Diana and her mother opposed the great god, he was angered and punished Diana. She would have to complete a task for each of the gods, culminating in the defeat of the monsters beyond "Doom's Doorway". This doorway was the Amazon's charge for millennia and if Diana was unsuccessful, the Amazons would be destroyed.

Diana succeeded in her trials, defeating numerous monsters including Echidna, the Chimera, the Cyclops, the Hydra, the Harpies, and the Minotaur. Eventually, Pan's bones were discovered on Olympus but it was too late to save Diana from her labors. Joined by her mother, Diana did indeed destroy the demons beneath Themyscira with the help of the amulet of Harmonia (these demons were funneled into Ares). Diana also freed Heracles, who had borne the weight of Themyscira for eons while imprisoned in a stone form and had been scarred by various monsters. Heracles was accepted into Olympus.

Soon thereafter, the gods secreted themselves away for a conference. At this time, Darkseid attacked Olympus. The dark god ceased hostilities, though, as soon as he realized the place was deserted. When the gods returned, they decided to destroy Mount Olympus and undertake a "cosmic migration" to the stars. Over Hermes' objections, they took several steps. First, the three elder brothers made a new pact to replace the original pact which divided Earth among them. Then, they combined the will of all the gods (minus Ares) and the strength of Amazon prayer, and used Diana's bracelets to amplify that power (the bracelets are all that remained of Zeus' Aegis; this Aegis was made from the hide of Amalthea, the goat which reared him. Thus, the old home was demolished and New Olympus was created. In order to properly establish this new home, it was necessary for the Gods to sequester themselves indefinitely.

Hermes defected from his brethren and would not join the migration. He had already involved himself in Man's World by stopping the evil Circe. Hermes elected to remain on Earth and joined Diana in her mission.

=== Wars of the Gods ===
Phobos returned alongside his sister Eris in alliance with Circe. Circe had amassed great power by bringing gods of various pantheons together. Among them were the Roman gods, who challenged the Olympians for their domain. It took much strength for Zeus to summon Hermes and Diana to New Olympus, where the gods had been trapped. Earth's heroes were able to turn the tide against Circe, but three gods died: Circe killed Hermes; Harmonia was killed by her sister Eris; and Eris herself was slain by Son of Vulcan. Zeus and the Olympians decided then to follow the call of Cronus and the Titans to help guide other worlds in the universe. New Olympus was left to the Roman gods.

For unexplained reasons, Heracles struck a deal with a mortal man, Harold Campion, whereby the two would exchange places (Earth for Olympus) Heracles used the mirror of Circe to conceal his identity and adventured under the name Champion. He cast a love spell on Diana and accompanied her for a time, until Diana discovered his true identity.

In the Gods' absence, the Amazons began to revert to clay. To justify the Olympians' return to Earth, Zeus summoned Diana and several of her friends to testify before him. It was Hippolyta who tipped the scales, however. She played a secret card which greatly swayed them. In truth, she simply reminded Ares that before her reincarnation, Hippolyta had been Ares' daughter, and thus Zeus' granddaughter. At this time, Zeus also granted strength and flight to Cassie Sandsmark. Soon, Highfather of the New Gods summoned Zeus and Heracles to once gain battle Darkseid. To this end, Zeus, Odin, Ares, Jove and Highfather merged into one being and entered the Source. When cast out, Zeus was gravely injured and remained bonded to Jove. Heracles returned with him to Olympus.

Their greatest champion, Princess Diana soon lost her life against the demon Neron. Hera (now presiding over Olympus) transfigured Diana into a goddess of truth and welcomed her to live with the gods. Diana was told she could not interfere with the daily lives of mortals, unless prayed to. Hera sits on the throne. The gods shared the secret of their division with Diana and decided to reunite their essences with those of their Roman counterparts. Diana could not be prevented from interfering with the mortal world and so she was banished to Earth. She was soon also stripped of her immortality.

The merger of the Greek and Roman pantheons did not sit well with the Roman goddess Diana. She accepted an offer of power from the old "Shattered God", separated from Artemis and betrayed the Olympians. Diana died in battle with Wonder Woman when she was crushed by a statue of Zeus. The Olympians were incapacitated, but Wonder Woman eventually found a way to awaken them in time for them to strike decisively at the Shattered God.

=== Merger of Pantheons ===
Goddesses (l to r): Mammitu, Demeter, Isis, Athena, Artemis, Aphrodite, Neith, Hestia and Bast.

With the appearance of the Bana-Mighdallian Amazons, the Olympians faced a new prospect. Though devout Amazons, these newest citizens of Themyscira do not worship the Greek gods. Renouncing them millennia ago, the tribe instead worship a combination of Egyptian and middle eastern deities. The central gods worshipped by the desert Amazons are: Isis (wisdom and magic), Mammitu (judgement bringer), Bast (nature and feminine), and Neith (mother figure and protection). These gods followed the Bana-Mighdallian Amazons to Themyscira where they continued to be worshipped. Facing the situation with hands tied, both pantheons agreed to integrate themselves with each other for the benefit of their people. Though these new gods do not reside on Olympus, they are treated with diplomacy when called to aid the Amazons in a united godly role. Despite the gods mentioned being part of the inner-circle of deities in the Bana's belief system, less significant gods have been shown to be part of their godly pantheon as well such as Sekhmet (war god), Thoth (their only known male god) and possibly Ishtar (love goddess). The gods of Bana-Mighdall proved their loyalty to the Olympians by aiding the Greek gods in battle when the war gods Sekhmet and Ares previously devised a coup on Olympus. Wonder Women had two mothers.

=== Revolution ===
For millennia, the goddess Athena waited patiently for the chance to prove herself worthy of the crown of Olympus. As Earth society developed, the goddess of knowledge grew in power and cunning, and ultimately challenged her father Zeus for the throne. To win this challenge, Athena sent for her champion, Wonder Woman, to face that of Zeus — Briareos of the Hecatoncheires. Though she was still blind, Diana was aided by the winged Pegasus but seemingly fell to Briareos. Unknown to Zeus, this was a trick played by Athena and Diana to prove to the latter that Zeus had no compassion and was not a worthy ruler. Athena agreed to forfeit if Zeus would spare Diana's life, but he denied her, proving his unworthiness. This prompted the other goddesses to deliver the head of Medusa unto Diana, which she used to turn Briareos to stone. Athena took the throne at last, but Zeus immediately began plotting a coup with his brothers in Tartarus.

Athena immediately set Diana on a quest into Hades' realm to free the god Hermes. She descended beneath Doom's Doorway with Wonder Girl (Cassandra Sandsmark) and Ferdinand the Minotaur and was confronted by Zeus' alliance. Ironically, she might not have succeeded but for the machinations of her constant nemesis, Ares. Ares acted as a double agent and gained Zeus' trust, but when the opportunity arose, he killed his uncle Hades and assumed control of the Underworld. Diana then used Hermes' caduceus to revive him. Back on Olympus, Zeus asked for Athena's forgiveness, which she granted. Athena then also restored Diana's sight, but bound it to her own.

It was on this quest that Cassandra Sandsmark finally learned of her own godly origins. Her mother had indeed lain with Zeus, but Helena Sandsmark forbade Diana or anyone from revealing the truth to Cassie.

Not long after this, Athena sensed a dark destiny for the gods amidst the cosmic mechanations of Alexander Luthor Jr. In the crisis created by his chaos, Diana was forced to kill Maxwell Lord, and incurred the ire of the world's public. The U.S. government responded by mobilizing against Themyscira, and Diana realized that as long as she was a target, the Amazons would never be safe. Diana prayed to the gods to take the Amazons to safety, but got more than she bargained for. On Olympus, she pleaded against Athena's decision to remove the gods from Earth's affairs. Regardless, the gods departed, leaving Diana bereft of family and faith.

Aquaman has also had run-ins with the Olympian sea deities. Poseidon had long relinquished the title of Sea King to Orin of Atlantis, but when Aquaman's subjects lost faith in him, Poseidon arranged a challenge with his son Triton. Aquaman bested Triton and the godling fell from grace with his father. In anger, Triton slayed Poseidon and claimed his power. Aquaman freed Poseidon by appealing to Lord Hades. When they returned from the dead, Poseidon slew his son in turn. Disgusted with mortal affairs, Poseidon bequeathed his trident to Aquaman. Aquaman somehow lost the Trident, though, as it was last seen with Queen Clea.

=== Other ancient beings ===
Wonder Woman also met the Lamia of myth, who laid with Zeus and bore his children. Hera changed her into a snake-like creature and killed her children. She now lurks in the American sewers, acting as a benevolent caregiver to troubled children. She attempted to commit suicide using Diana's lasso (which she had her young friend Sneaker steal), but Diana stopped her and Lamia disappeared along with Sneaker, with whom she had developed a mother-daughter relationship.

Later, Wonder Girl also encountered the Empousai called "Lamiai". Lamiai bit into Cassie but recoiled when she discovered that she had god's blood. Before she could reveal Cassie's father, she was slain by Ares. Lamiai's brother Mormolykeia also battled Ferdinand the Minotaur during this quest.

=== Rise of the Olympian ===
- Rise of the Olympian
- Wonder Woman (vol. 3) #26–33

== Members ==
Member	First appearance	Description
Aphrodite	All-Star Comics #8 (December 1941)	Aphrodite is the goddess of love and beauty who is based on the Greek goddess of the same name and the half-sister of Wonder Woman. In the 1940s, Aphrodite was Wonder Woman's patron goddess. Later, Athena joined her as Diana's main patron. Post-Crisis, Aphrodite was joined by Athena, Artemis, Hestia, Demeter, and Hermes as Wonder Woman's patrons, though she most often abstained from interacting with the amazons. Post-Crisis, Aphrodite's role was severely minimized, appearing as a faceless, beautiful naked woman. Post-Rebirth, Aphrodite appeared as an ally to Wonder Woman in the form of a dove. It is unknown if Aphrodite continues to serve as patron of the amazons.
Apollo	Wonder Woman #3 (February–March 1943)	Apollo is the god of the sun, music, poetry, oracles, healing, and medicine, and the twin brother to Artemis who is based on the Greek god of the same name. In the New 52, Apollo sought to claim the throne of Olympus after Zeus had gone missing. He was eventually killed by the First Born, though he has since returned. He is also the half-brother of Wonder Woman.
Ares	National Comics #1 (July 1940)	Ares is the god of war, violence, bloodlust, courage, and ferocity and is often one of Wonder Woman's deadliest adversaries who is based on the Greek god of the same name. He originally went by his Roman name, Mars. He is also the half-brother of Wonder Woman.
Artemis	Wonder Woman #3 (February–March 1943)	Artemis is the goddess of the moon, hunting, archery, forest, and animals, and the twin sister to Apollo who is based on the Greek goddess of the same name. Post-Crisis, she was one of Wonder Woman's patron goddesses. Since the New 52 happened, Artemis is now the half-sister of Wonder Woman, but Artemis was more antagonistic, often teaming up with her brother to battle the Amazon. Post-Rebirth, Artemis took the form of a deer and aided Wonder Woman with several other gods.
Athena	All-Star Comics #8 (December 1941)	Athena is the goddess of wisdom, strategy, crafts, skills, and just war who is based on the Greek goddess of the same name. When Queen Hippolyta uses the soil of Themyscira to create her daughter, Athena turned clay to flesh and breathed life into the child. But then in The New 52, since then, Athena has become the half-sister of Wonder Woman, since Wonder Woman is the daughter of Zeus now. Athena is often depicted as one of Wonder Woman's primary patron deities. Post-Rebirth, Athena aided Wonder Woman in the form of an owl.
Deimos	Wonder Woman #183 (July–August 1969)	Deimos is the god of fear who is based on the Greek god of the same name. In the post-crisis universe, Deimos used manipulation to incite a third World War. Wonder Woman and her allies put an end to Deimos's plot, which resulted in his death. He was later resurrected by his brother Phobos, though he possessed the Joker's body. Post-Rebirth, Deimos appeared as a pompous pretty boy alongside his twin brother Phobos, and attempted to find the location of Themyscira to free his father Ares.
Demeter	Wonder Woman #328 (December 1985)	Demeter is the goddess of agriculture, harvest, fertility, and crops who is based on the Greek goddess of the same name. She is the aunt of Wonder Woman. Post-Crisis, she served as one of Wonder Woman's patron goddesses. In the New 52, she had green skin and resembled a dryad.
Dionysus	Wonder Woman (vol. 2) #7 (August 1987)	Dionysus is the god of wine, partying, festivities, ectasy, and theatre who is based on the Greek god of the same name. Originally depicted as an overweight male, Dionysus was redesigned in the New 52 as a younger man with fox-like features (including a tail).
Eirene	Wonder Woman (vol. 4) #45 (December 2015)	Eirene is the goddess of peace who is based on the Greek goddess of the same name. In the New 52, Eirene is madly in love with Ares as she feels complete, and balance with him. But if Ares is not around, she becomes extremely angry, violent, and mentally unstable.
Eris	Wonder Woman #183 (July–August 1969)	Eris is the goddess of discord who is based on the Greek goddess of the same name and the daughter of Ares and Aphrodite or Hera. In the New 52, Eris goes by the name "Strife" and is often a major foe for Wonder Woman.
Eros	Wonder Woman #317 (October 1984)	Eros is the god of desire, lust, and attraction who is the son of Ares and Aphrodite and is based on the Greek god of the same name.
Hades	Wonder Woman #329 (February 1986)	Hades is the god of the underworld, dead, and wealth who is based on the Greek god of the same name and the uncle of Wonder Woman. Hades has occasionally been antagonistic towards Wonder Woman, but sometimes also acts as an ally towards her.
Harmonia	Wonder Woman (vol. 2) #2 (March 1987)	Harmonia is the goddess of concord who is based on the Greek goddess of the same name. As the daughter of Ares and Aphrodite, Harmonia was a disfigured, hideous goddess. Wonder Woman eventually cured her of her ugliness. Later, Harmonia was killed by her brother Phobos during the War of the Gods.
Hecate	Superman Family #218 (May 1982)	Hecate is the goddess of ghosts, magic, sorcery, witchcraft, and necromancy who is based on the Greek goddess of the same name. Despised by the other gods, Hecate empowered the witch Circe, giving her incredible magical abilities.
Hephaestus	Action Comics #267 (August 1960)	Hephaestus is the god of construction, blacksmithing, metallurgy, and craftsmanship who is based on the Greek god of the same name. He is the half-brother of Wonder Woman. Many of Wonder Woman's weapons and armor have been forged by Hephaestus. In the New 52, the hideous Hephaestus had taken in the male Amazons abandoned by the Themysciran Amazons. Post-Rebirth, Hephaestus took the form of a mouse and aided Wonder Woman with several other gods.
Hera	Sea Devils #14 (November–December 1963)	Hera is the queen of Olympus and the goddess of marriage, home, childbirth, nurturing, and family who is based on the Greek goddess of the same name. Post-Crisis, she destroyed Themyscira after finding Zeus leering at Artemis of Bana-Mighdall. In the New 52, Hera initially appears antagonistic, though after her immortality and powers are stripped from her by Apollo, she joins Wonder Woman in her quest to protect the reincarnated Zeus. Post-Rebirth, she appeared as a peacock and aided Wonder Woman alongside several other gods.
Heracles	All-Star Comics #8 (December 1941)	Heracles, also known as Hercules, is the son of Zeus and Alcmene and the half-brother of Wonder Woman. He is the god of strength and heroes who is based on the Greek god of the same name. Post-Crisis, Hercules defiled Hippolyta and the amazons which led to the latter leaving the earthly realm and founding Themyscira. Hercules was later forgiven by Hippolyta and the amazons. Much later, he was corrupted by Circe into joining her forces.
Hermaphroditus	Wonder Woman (vol. 5) #69 (April 24, 2019)	Hermaphroditus is the god/goddess of androgyny, sexuality, intersexuality, and homosexual matings who is based on the Greek god/goddess of the same name. In the DC Universe, Hermaphroditus is a intersexual deity with angelic wings and goes by the name "Atlantiades". They revealed that they despise their mother Aphrodite and left Mount Olympus in hopes to get away from her. So they decided to take refuge on earth in a neighborhood called Summergrove, Connecticut. They used their powers to influence the Summergrove residents to succumb to their innermost desires.
Hermes	Action Comics #267 (August 1960)	Hermes is the messenger of Olympus and the god of thievery, speed, travel, and commerce who is based on the Greek god of the same name and the half-brother of Wonder Woman. Post-Crisis, Hermes was one of Wonder Woman's earliest allies. He was eventually killed by Circe during the War of the Gods, but Wonder Woman freed him from Tartarus. In the New 52, the bird-like Hermes was a close ally to Wonder Woman and aided in protecting Zeke, the reincarnation of Zeus. Post-Rebirth, Hermes took the form of a tortoise and aided Wonder Woman alongside several other gods.
Hestia	Wonder Woman (vol. 2) #1 (February 1987)	Hestia is the goddess of sacred fire, truth, ceremonies, and sacrifices who is based on the Greek goddess of the same name and the aunt of Wonder Woman. Post-Crisis, Hestia was one of Wonder Woman's patron goddesses.
Morpheus	Wonder Woman #140 (August 1963)	Morpheus is the god of sleep who is based on the Greek god of the same name.
Nemesis	Wonder Woman #611 (July 2011)	Nemesis is the goddess of vengeance who is based on the Greek goddess of the same name.
Nyx	Batwoman #13 (December 2012)	Nyx is the goddess of night who is based on the Greek goddess of the same name.
Pan	The Fury of Firestorm #5 (October 1985)	Pan is the god of wildness, shepards, meadows, and mountain flocks who is based on Greek god of the same name. Post-Crisis, the satyr-like Pan was often seen on Mount Olympus with the other gods.
Persephone	Wonder Woman (vol. 2) #5 (June 1987)	Persephone is the goddess of spring, flowers, and vegetation who is based on the Greek goddess of the same name. She is the wife of Hades. She is also Wonder Woman's half-sister through their shared father, Zeus.
Phobos	Wonder Woman #183 (July–August 1969)	Phobos is the god of fear who is based on the Greek god of the same name. Post-Rebirth, he is the twin brother of Deimos and was attempting to free Ares from his imprisonment on Themyscira.
Poseidon	Flash Comics #9 (September 1940)	Poseidon is the god of the sea, earthquakes, and storms who is based on the Greek god of the same name. He is the uncle of Wonder Woman. Post-Crisis, Poseidon was most often seen as an ally to Wonder Woman, though he eventually sided with Zeus and Hades after Athena took over Mount Olympus. In New 52, Poseidon's Appearance is blue-skinned half Toad, half Octopus.
Thanatos	The New Teen Titans #11 (September 1981)	Thanatos is the god of death who is based on the Greek god of the same name. Post-Rebirth, he attempted to claim Wonder Woman's life after she was shot.
Themis	The New Teen Titans #11 (August 1985)	Themis is the goddess of law, justice, and order who is based on the Greek goddess of the same name.
Triton	Aquaman (vol. 5) Annual #1 (1995)	Triton is the messenger of the sea and son of Poseidon who is based on the Greek god of the same name. While often an Aquaman villain, he was killed by Wonder Woman after he murdered several children.
Zeus	Action Comics #267 (August 1960)	Zeus is the king of Olympus and god of the sky, weather, order, law, justice, and hospitality who is based on the Greek god of the same name. Post-Crisis, he became enamored with Wonder Woman's beauty and grace. Later, Ares used his son Eros in a plot to make Zeus fall in love with the Amazon Artemis, which enraged Hera into destroying Themyscira. He was later overthrown by Athena, though he attempted to reclaim his throne with the help of Hades and Poseidon. In The New 52, when the whole world of DC Comics was rebooted, Wonder Woman's origin was retconned, it was revealed that Zeus is now Wonder Woman's father, and it has been the canon origin for Wonder Woman since then. Post-Rebirth, Zeus appeared as an ally for Wonder Woman in the form of an eagle.

== In other media ==
=== Television ===
- The Olympian Gods appear in the DC Animated Universe series Justice League and Justice League Unlimited, consisting of Hades (voiced by John Rhys-Davies in the first appearance, Bob Joles in the second appearance), Ares (voiced by Michael York), Hephaestus (voiced by Ed Asner), and Hermes (voiced by Jason Bateman).
- Athena appears in the Justice League Action episode "The Trouble with Truth", voiced by Jessica Walter.

=== Film ===
- Zeus, Hera, Ares, Hades, and Deimos appear in Wonder Woman (2009), with Zeus voiced by David McCallum, Hera by Marg Helgenberger, Ares by Alfred Molina, Hades by Oliver Platt, and Deimos by John DiMaggio.
- The Olympian Gods, also referred to as the Old Gods, appear films set in the DC Extended Universe (DCEU).
  - The Olympian Gods are featured in Wonder Woman (2017). In ancient times, Ares was condemned by the other Olympian Gods for his warmongering, which led to him killing Apollo, Artemis, Athena, Hades, Hestia, and Poseidon until Zeus drove him off of Mount Olympus. In his dying breath, Zeus created Themyscira for the Amazons and left them the "Godkiller" to kill Ares should he rise again.
  - Zeus, Artemis, and Ares appear in Justice League, with Zeus portrayed by Sergi Constance, Artemis portrayed by Aurore Lauzeral, and Ares portrayed by stuntman Nick McKinless, with David Thewlis' face super-imposed over his. 5,000 years ago, they assisted the humans, the Amazons, the Atlanteans, and the Green Lantern Corps in fighting Steppenwolf and his army of Parademons.
  - In the Snyder cut of the film, the Olympian Gods battle Darkseid rather than Steppenwolf.

=== Video games ===
- The Olympian Gods appear in DC Universe Online, consisting of Ares, Hades, Athena, Hecate, Zeus, Hera, Poseidon, and Aphrodite
- The Olympian Gods appear in Injustice: Gods Among Us, consisting of Zeus, Ares, and Athena.

== See also ==
- Olympians
- Rise of the Olympian
