= Hephaestus (DC Comics) =

Publication information
- Publisher: DC Comics
- First appearance: Wonder Woman #226 (November 1976)
- Created by: Martin Pasko (writer), José Delbo (artist)

In-story information
- Place of origin: Mount Olympus
- Team affiliations: Olympian Gods
- Notable aliases: Vulcan
- Abilities: God-like strength, speed, stamina, and durability; Shapeshifting; Immortality; Genius-level intellect

Hephaestus is a fictional character appearing in American comic books published by DC Comics, son of Zeus and Hera, and the half-brother of the superhero Wonder Woman. He is adapted from the Greek god of the same name. Hephaestus first appeared in Wonder Woman #226.

== Fictional character biography ==
Hephaestus is the Olympian Gods' blacksmith whose history is largely the same as his mythological counterpart. In post-Crisis continuity, Hephaestus forged Wonder Woman's golden Lasso of Truth and bracelets.

In 2011, The New 52 rebooted DC's continuity. After saving Hephaestus from a molten monster sent by Hades, Wonder Woman discovers that Hephaestus's laborers are not automatons and actually men. Hephaestus and Eros state that the laborers were discarded male children from Themyscira who Hephaestus took in. He cut a deal with the Amazons to take in the children in exchange for giving the Amazons weapons. Later that night, Wonder Woman tries to get Hephaestus to release the males, but they refuse.

== Powers and abilities ==
Like the Olympian Gods, Hephastus has supernatural abilities that include size-changing, shapeshifting, and immortality. He also has genius-level intellect and is an expert blacksmith.

== In other media ==
- Hephaestus appears in the Justice League Unlimited episode "Hawk and Dove", voiced by Ed Asner.
- Hephaestus appears as a character summon in Scribblenauts Unmasked: A DC Comics Adventure.
