= Lasso of Truth =

Fictional lasso used by Wonder Woman

- Artwork for the cover of Wonder Woman, vol. 2, #186 (Dec. 2002) prominently featuring the Lasso of Truth. Art by Adam Hughes.

Publication information
- Publisher: DC Comics
- First appearance: Sensation Comics #6 (June 1942)
- Created by: William Moulton Marston

In story information
- Type: Mystic item/artifact, Weapon
- Element of stories featuring: Wonder Woman

The Lasso of Truth is a weapon wielded by DC Comics superhero Wonder Woman, Princess Diana of Themyscira. It is also known as the Lariat of Truth, the Magic Lasso, the Lasso of Hestia or the Golden Perfect. It was created by William Moulton Marston, inventor of the lie detector, as an allegory for feminine charm, but it later became more popular as a device to extract truth from people.

The lariat forces anyone it captures into submission, compelling them to obey the wielder and tell the truth. It is also a divine relic, and it also requires a pure heart to wield.

== Origin and influences ==
William Moulton Marston created Wonder Woman but he also worked, in the period before, during and after World War I, on understanding and perfecting the systolic blood-pressure test while working on his Ph.D. in psychology at Harvard University. Blood pressure was one of several elements measured in the polygraph tests that had been under development since 1895 by Italian criminologist Cesare Lombroso and others. Marston's wife, psychologist and lawyer Elizabeth Holloway Marston, one of his inspirations for the Wonder Woman character, also played a key role in his lie-detector research.

The lie detector had nothing to do with Marston's creation of the Magic Lasso. Wonder Woman's Magic Lasso or Golden Lasso was the result of their research into emotions and was more about submission than truth. Marston created the Magic Lasso as an allegory for feminine charm and the compliant effect it has on people. The idea behind feminine allure was that submission to a pleasant controller (instead of a harsh one) was more pleasant and therefore made it more likely that people would submit.

In a 1997 academic article, psychologist Geoffry Bunn incorrectly reinforces a correlation between the lasso and the systolic blood-pressure test:

Anyone caught in the lasso found it impossible to lie. And because Wonder Woman used it to extract confessions and compel obedience, the golden lasso was of course nothing less than a lie detector [...] Like the lie detector upon which it was modelled, Wonder Woman's Golden Lasso produced truth—and by implication justice and freedom too—through coercion.

== Publication history ==
=== Pre-Crisis ===
The lasso was formed from Aphrodite's girdle, which made it indestructible, and its magical properties were granted by the Goddess herself. The powers forced whoever was bound within it to obey the commands of whoever held the other end. This effect could be used on larger groups of people, although this reduced its efficiency. In addition to being unbreakable, the lasso was also infinitely elastic.

Diana coated it in special Amazon chemicals that allowed it to transform her civilian clothes into Wonder Woman's garb. Diana demonstrated a remarkable level of skill with the lasso, performing such feats as twirling it to create air currents (upon which she could float) and spinning it to emit magic-disrupting frequencies.

=== Post-Crisis ===
In post-Crisis, continuity, the Lasso was forged by the god Hephaestus from the Golden Girdle of Gaea once worn by Antiope, sister of Hippolyta. It is so strong that not even Hercules can break it. It is given to Diana after Hippolyta consults the Goddesses. Originally the lasso was given to Wonder Woman when she returned to Paradise Island. William Moulton Marston later retconned the origin story in Wonder Woman #1 (June 1942), in which it is shown that her mother gave it to her after Diana won a tournament on Paradise Island, before she left the island for the United States.

Empowered by the fires of Hestia, the lasso forces anyone held by it to tell the absolute truth. Furthermore, simple physical contact with the lasso can be enough to have this effect such as when Barbara Ann Minerva attempted to swindle it from Diana, but was forced to confess her intentions when she held the lasso. It is also infinitely long, and can lengthen depending on its user's desire. The fires are said to even be able to cure insanity, as they did in the case of Ares, God of War, when he attempted to incite World War III. He renounced his plan when the lasso showed him that such a war would not only destroy all life on Earth as he wished, but also any potential worshippers he sought to gain from it. The lasso possesses incredible strength and is virtually unbreakable. One story even showed Wonder Woman using the lasso to contain the explosion of two atom bombs. Unable to stop the American bombs that would set off a Russian doomsday machine she wrapped the bombs in her lasso and let the bombs explode. It has easily held beings with tremendous superhuman strength such as Superman, Captain Marvel, who has the strength of Hercules and the Power of Zeus, and Power Girl, as well as gods such as Ares and Heracles. In several Pre-Crisis stories, it was even capable of binding Wonder Woman herself on the occasions she was caught, sometimes by Gunther. It is shown that Wonder Woman still has her powers even if bound by the lasso.

The only times it has ever been shown to break was when truth itself was challenged. For example, in JLA the lasso broke when she refused to believe the confession it wrought from Rama Khan. Elsewhere, when the backwards-thinking monster Bizarro was caught in Trinity, he was horrified by the idea of truth. As the antithesis of reason and logic, he was able to break the lasso. The fairy tale villainess, Queen of Fables, who has the power to bring any fictional or non-true character to life, and is herself "fictional", had power over the lasso by bringing fictional characters to life and having her minions break it.

The magic lasso has subsequently been shown to produce a wide array of effects. When battling the entity Decay, Wonder Woman used the lasso's link to Gaia, the goddess of the earth, as a circuit between the earth and the monster, pumping the entity of death with life-giving energies that destroyed the creature. Diana herself stated that the lasso's connection to Gaea also constantly renews its user with these energies. Wonder Woman has also used it to create a ring of protective fire around people to protect them from Circe's bestiamorphs. The lasso's energies are also shown to be capable of destroying beings forcibly resurrected by the rings of the Black Lantern Corps. As the goddess of truth, Diana also used it to take memories of Donna Troy and restore her to life. In Pre-Crisis comics, the lasso also had the power to effectively control those who were bound within it.

In the mini-comic enclosed with the release of the Kenner Super Powers figure of Wonder Woman, the Amazing Amazon ensnares a mind-controlled Superman with her lasso, preventing him from destroying the Washington Monument. Superman is unable to resist the powers of the lasso as Wonder Woman renders him unconscious. Later, Wonder Woman uses her lasso on Brainiac and commands the villain to release Superman from his mind control.

In later post-Crisis comics, the power of truth was written as innate to Wonder Woman herself, with the lasso merely a focus of that power. A storyline in the Morrison-era JLA comics by Joe Kelly depicted the lasso as an archetypal manifestation of universal truth, and, once broken (like when Wonder Woman doubted the truth that it was revealing to her because she did not like it), disrupted the underlying truth of reality itself. With the lasso broken, reality came to be dictated by whatever people believed to be the case, starting with older beliefs and extending to beliefs that were held by various individuals in the present. This resulted in Earth becoming the center of the universe for two weeks, Earth becoming flat for several hours, the moon turning into cheese for a time, Kyle Rayner assuming a Hal Jordan-like appearance (many people still saw Hal as 'the' Green Lantern), and Batman fading in and out of existence due to his 'urban legend' status (meaning that people were not sure if he even existed). This allegorical interpretation is often ignored in later stories and by much of fandom, as the lasso was long established as magically unable to break, and was never before stated to be the ultimate representation of truth. During her adventures with the Justice League team of superheroes, Diana battled a villain named Amazo who was able to duplicate aspects of the lasso for his own use.

During her tenure as writer for Wonder Woman, Gail Simone has further explored the nature of the Lasso of Truth, describing it as "a deadly weapon, that not only binds you, and follows its mistress' commands, the damned thing can see into your soul".

This lasso is not to be confused with the lasso of the current Wonder Girl, Cassie Sandsmark. This lasso, given to her by Ares, has the power to shock a target with Zeus' lightning if Cassandra ropes her target. Donna Troy also wields a mystical lasso of her own called the Lasso of Persuasion, which has the ability to persuade anyone within its confines to do Donna's bidding if her willpower is greater than theirs.

Similarly, the character Bizarra also has a magic lasso, the difference being that her lasso forces one to tell lies.

Despite Wonder Woman's lasso being mystical in origin, in Bruce Wayne: The Road Home, Batman apparently has reverse-engineered the Amazo technology, which aids duplicating the lasso's capabilities artificially. During Endgame, when the Joker uses a toxin to turn the Justice League against Batman, Batman is able to immobilise Diana using the 'bind of veils', essentially a Lasso of Lies that was woven by Hephaestus after he created the original Lasso by inverting the original weave. Allegedly created using the wool from the sheep used by Odysseus and his men to escape the blind cyclops, it took Batman two years to acquire on the supernatural black market, incorporating it into a suit of armor specifically designed to stand up to the Justice League, with the bind of veils trapping Diana in an illusion where she has killed Batman.

In the Elseworlds tale Superman: Red Son, Wonder Woman was subdued and restrained in her own lasso by the Soviet terrorist incarnation of Batman. In order to free herself and rescue Superman from Lex Luthor's deadly red sun lamps, Wonder Woman snapped the cords of her "indestructible" lasso. The shock of the incident appeared to age Diana, leaving her grey-haired, frail, and unable to speak.

In the series Absolute Wonder Woman, set in the alternate Alpha-World, Diana has three magic lassos, made and enchanted by her adoptive mother Circe. These lassos have very different attributes and functions than the mainline counterpart: the first, named "Nemesis", is a red lasso that burns its target in proportion to their sins. The second, "Θυσία" or "Sacrifice", is green, and transforms the mind and body of its target, such as when Diana used it on herself to transform into Medusa. The third, named "Troika", is a blue lasso that forces the person it is used on to face the moment of greatest guilt and fear in their life but renders both the target and Diana catatonic.

== In other media ==
Wonder Woman with the Lasso of Truth (Hestia) in Wonder Woman

=== Film ===
- The Lasso of Truth appears in Wonder Woman (2009).
- The Lasso of Truth appears in films set in the DC Animated Movie Universe (DCAMU).
- The Lasso of Truth appears in films set in the DC Extended Universe (DCEU).
- The Lasso of Truth appears in Teen Titans Go! To the Movies.
- The Lasso of Truth appears in Superman: Red Son. This version is connected to Wonder Woman's life force, and she uses it as the main source of her powers and longevity.
- The Lasso of Truth appears in Space Jam: A New Legacy.

=== In television ===
- The Lasso of Truth appears in Wonder Woman (1975). This version can cause selective amnesia.
- The Lasso of Truth appears in Super Friends. This version can follow Wonder Woman's commands, physically moving on its own to accomplish tasks.
- The Lasso of Truth appears in the DC Animated Universe series Justice League and Justice League Unlimited.
- The Lasso of Truth appears in Justice League Action.
- The Lasso of Truth appears in DC Super Hero Girls.

=== Video games ===
- The Lasso of Truth appears in Justice League Heroes.
- The Lasso of Truth appears in Mortal Kombat vs. DC Universe.
- The Lasso of Truth appears in DC Universe Online.
- The Lasso of Truth appears in Injustice: Gods Among Us.
- The Lasso of Truth appears in Infinite Crisis.
- The Lasso of Truth appears as part of the Wonder Woman skin in Fortnite.
- The Lasso of Truth appears in Justice League: Cosmic Chaos.
- The Lasso of Truth appears in MultiVersus.
