= Hermes (DC Comics) =

DC Comics character

- Hermes as depicted in Wonder Woman vol. 2 #37 (December 1989). Art by Chris Marrinan.

Publication information
- Publisher: DC Comics
- First appearance: Wonder Woman #1 (June 1942)
- Created by: William Moulton Marston; H. G. Peter

In-story information
- Place of origin: Mount Olympus
- Team affiliations: Olympian Gods
- Notable aliases: Mercury
- Abilities: Deity, vast supernatural abilities including size-changing, shapeshifting, immortality, and super-speed

Hermes is a fictional deity in the DC Comics world, son of Zeus, and the half-brother of Wonder Woman. Hermes is the messenger and herald of the Gods, as well as the god of healers, thieves, and travellers. He is based on the Greek god of the same name.

== Publication history ==
Hermes first appeared in Wonder Woman #1 and was adapted by William Moulton Marston and Harry G. Peter.

== Fictional character biography ==
Hermes is the Messenger of the Gods. He assisted in turning a baby sculpture that Queen Hippolyta made into a real baby, resulting in the origin of Princess Diana, when Wonder Woman's origin was still "being sculpted from clay", before her origin was changed in The New 52, as Wonder Woman is now the biological daughter of Zeus and Hippolyta.

In post-Crisis continuity, Hermes is present at a meeting with fellow gods to discuss their dwindling worship. After Zeus deems the issue beneath him and leaves, Hermes accompanies Aphrodite, Ares, Athena, Demeter, and Hestia to the Underworld and the Cavern of Souls, where Gaia houses the souls of women who have been unjustly killed by men. They harvest the souls to reincarnate them into Amazons and give them a home on Themyscira, with one becoming Diana.

During the War of the Gods storyline, Hermes was destroyed by Circe. Hermes' body was later retrieved from the Underworld.

In The New 52 continuity reboot, Hermes is first seen with Wonder Woman, instructing her to protect Zola because Hera wants her dead. Hermes and Zola were later seen walking through the woods when they are approached by Aphrodite. When Hermes states to Zola that Aphrodite is married to Hephaestus, Aphrodite states that Hephaestus has other "charms". She tells them that she will not be attending the wedding as there is little love in Hell.

== Powers and abilities ==
As a deity, Hermes possesses vast supernatural abilities, including size-changing, shapeshifting, and immortality. He also possesses super-speed thanks to his winged sandals.

== In other media ==
- Hermes appears in the Justice League Unlimited episode "The Balance", voiced by Jason Bateman.
- Hermes appears in DC Universe Online.
- Hermes appears as a character summon in Scribblenauts Unmasked: A DC Comics Adventure.
- Hermes appears in the comic book adaption of DC Super Hero Girls.
