= Rise of the Olympian =

Wonder Woman story arc

- Cover of Wonder Woman vol. 3, #26 (January 2009), art by Aaron Lopresti.
- Publisher: DC Comics
- Publication date: January – August 2009
- Genre: Superhero; Mythology
- Title(s): Wonder Woman (vol. 3) #26-33
- Main character: Wonder Woman

Creative team
- Writer: Gail Simone
- Penciller: Aaron Lopresti
- Inker: Matt Ryan
- Letterer: Travis Lanham
- Colorist: Brad Anderson
- Editor(s): Matt Idelson; Sean Ryan

"Rise of the Olympian" is a Wonder Woman story arc written by Gail Simone with art by Aaron Lopresti.

== Publication history ==
DC Comics and Gail Simone felt that the Wonder Woman events, even event-styled stories, were always "shotgun" (for example, the bashed Amazons Attack! event). Where Diana was a changing character in vision, Gail wanted to keep Diana as a consistent, cohesive vision for readers who they can rally behind. One of them that she had been doing since her debut arc, "The Circle", was re-establishing Diana from her grace, her power, and as she says, her role as "the DCU's best asskicker". Her supporting cast was also re-established, such as Queen Hippolyta and the rest of the Amazons.

In her interview with Newsarama, Gail gave out her plans for the event storyline, the first major epic of her run. She promised new characters, new villains, new threats, ending it with "new everything". Some of the characters are going to have a planned big impact on the DCU, a "one much-loved, much-feared character" will return from the dead, and the story itself is to be "a huge new chapter in the Wonder Woman mythology". She also pointed out that Themyscira plays a role, and from after what happened in Amazons Attack!, the Amazons themselves are going to return. She even went as to explain that because they are "artists, hunters, warriors, poets, and lovers", the Amazons are a "cool concept in the DCU". She also confirmed that Hippolyta plays a role, and the story point from The Circle where Diana asked the help of Kane Milohai shows the consequences from swearing loyalty to another god. She has even compared this storyline akin to "Knightfall".

In the discussion of the Olympian, as a joke, she had said that it's about a "Wonder Woman who is a man". By Dan DiDio, he made a joke title that he said he wanted to become the actual title of "Manazons". Gail explains that it's about a well-intentioned god who seeks to keep the promise of the Amazons by re-creating their entire ideal in his own image. An insight on this was seen in DC Universe #0 where two gods make mention on how Diana has "failed" on bringing peace, and in showing a race of male warriors, one of them says "changing the world is not a job for women, it's a job for men".

== Plot ==
Returning to Mount Olympus after being held captive by the New Gods of Apokolips, the Olympian Gods discover their home defiled and memories tarnished. Realizing their place in the modern world, the goddess Athena wills her godhood to end. Seeking to reignite her passion to rule, Zeus uses the remaining power of the gods to bring about a few changes in the world. After sensing the Amazons have had their memories altered as well and scattered across the globe with false personas, Zeus restores their memories and provides them access back to their homeland of Themyscira.

Finding Queen Hippolyta on the island, Zeus appears before her and tells her the Amazons will soon return. He also tells her that the Amazons have no more need to be warriors of peace and deserve a rest for all time. He explains that he will create a new island of warriors who will take the Amazon's place in the world. They will be responsible for creating peace among the world's countries and the Amazons will then be able to rest in death.

The Gargareans tribe created by Zeus. Interior artwork of DC Universe #0, June 2008, art by Aaron Lopresti.

Keeping his word, Zeus creates the island of Thalarion 300 nautical miles (560 km) from Themyscira. There he also creates a kingdom city made of crystal and a river of gold. He then re-animates the corpses of long dead Greek warriors. Among them are Jason (the former leader of the Argonauts) and Euphemus, the son of the sea god Poseidon. Zeus calls this new race of men Gargareans and ranks them to be honorable enough to be considered Olympians. The god then informs them that their city is created out of clear crystal so that there can never be secrets among them, the golden river will provide them with wealth enough to deal with the outside world and not cause jealousy among each other, anyone who enters their island without permission will die instantly, no women will be allowed to set foot on the island, and their new favored god would be the goddess Athena. To provide the Gargareans air transport, Zeus also creates mountable winged lions and winged horses. Zeus then instructs them to slaughter dictators and dismember warmongers as a way of bringing harmony to the world. Zeus explains that after this has been done that the Olympians will then join the new race in death at the bottom of the sea. Zeus then informs Jason that he will create a new son for him in his honor.

On their first mission the Gargareans board the re-created ship Argo and travel to the Persian Gulf. There they battle the U.S. battleship New England. Due to the magical enchantments tied to the Argo and Euphemus' control of large sea creatures, the battleship New England is unable to defeat the Gargareans.

While they battle, Zeus kills the Hawaiian god Kāne Milohai and tears out his heart.

Upon their return to Thalarion, the Gargareans discover Zeus waiting for them. He tells them that the time has come and magically causes a fire to burn brightly. Within the fire a skeletal being reaches out and takes Kāne Milohai's heart from Zeus' hand. The heart's substance then engulfs the fiery skeleton and forms a body. Zeus then presents the new being, Achilles, as the Gargarean's new leader. To serve as Achilles' personal transport, Zeus also created a massive and powerful elephant named Mysia who has two trunks, two mouths, three glowing eyes, an impenetrable hide, and the ability to walk on air.

After attacking several countries and disrupting a United Nations assembly, Wonder Woman is informed of their existence and confronts them during an attack in Russia. Wonder Woman informs Achilles during battle that they are being used by outside forces and demonstrates their naivete by safely detonating a warhead they mistakenly launched in the sky above them.

After this, Diana battles Genocide, an agent of the war god Ares and leaves her to drown in the ocean. However, Diana is unable to leave the creature to her fate and attempts to save her, only to find that Genocide has vanished. Angered, Ares commanded Euphemus to cause a swarm of deadly sea creatures to attack Themyscira and Thalarion. The Gargareans joined forces with the Amazons in defending their nations. During this battle, Diana deduced that Ares was the grand manipulator and confronted him. Not allowing Ares much time to gloat in his latest masterpiece of war, Diana took a battle axe and used it to strike Ares' head, splitting his helmet in two. The then dead Ares falls to his knees uttering in his last breath, "Amazon...what have you done?" Achilles wishes to kill Euphemus as well for his treachery, but is convinced by Jason to simply exile him instead. Euphemus then enters the ocean, leaving with his fellow sea creatures.

After Ares' death, Zeus thanks Diana by informing her that he killed her newfound god Kāne Milohai, used the dead god's heart to create Achilles, and urges Diana to return to the Olympian faith. This causes a reverse reaction and Diana physically strikes Zeus and denounces her Amazon heritage. Zeus then decrees that the Gargareans and the Amazons are to become one people. To head the new nation Hippolyta is to step down from her royal station and be replaced by Achilles. Achilles then takes the rogue Amazon Alkyone as his bride. Unbeknownst to everyone else, Alkyone has the totem of Genocide in her possession, claiming herself to be the creature's new mother.
