= Ares (DC Comics) =

Supervillain appearing in DC Comics

- Ares, the God of War, taken from Wonder Woman #5 (April 1987). Art by George Pérez, Bruce Patterson, and Tatjana Wood.

Publication information
- Publisher: DC Comics
- First appearance: Wonder Woman #1 (June 1942)
- Created by: William Moulton Marston; Harry G. Peter

In-story information
- Species: Olympian Gods
- Partnerships: Deimos, Phobos, Eris, Eros
- Notable aliases: Mars, War, Ari Buchanan
- Abilities: Superhuman strength, speed, stamina, agility, reflexes, senses, and intelligence; Immortality; Invulnerability; Draws power from violence and conflict; Darkness manipulation; Dimensional travel; Regeneration; Teleportation; Energy projection; Flight; Dark magic; Shapeshifting; Mind control; Necromancy; Power distribution; Pyrokinesis; Size alteration; Molecular reconstruction; Telepathy; Telekinesis; Illusion casting; Weapon proficiency; Expert martial artist and hand-to-hand combatant; Time manipulation; Master strategist and tactician

Ares (also known as Mars) is a fictional character appearing in DC Comics publications and related media. Based on the Greek mythological figure Ares, he is the Olympian god of war, the son of Zeus and Hera, and the half-brother of the superhero Wonder Woman, as well as her recurring adversary. Since his first comic book appearance in 1942, he has been featured prominently as an antagonist during every era of Wonder Woman's comic book adventures, and in many adaptations of her stories in other media.

Ares first appeared in Wonder Woman #1, published in the summer of 1942, written by Wonder Woman creator William Moulton Marston. His introductory panels name him as Ares, though the narration goes on to note that he is "now called" by his Roman name Mars. He would be known by that name (with sporadic exceptions) for the next 45 years, until creative team George Pérez and Greg Potter restored the Greek name Ares as part of their reboot of the Wonder Woman comic book mythos in 1987.

As the narrative continuity of Wonder Woman comics has been adjusted by different writers and artists throughout the years, various versions of Mars/Ares (with various personalities and physical appearances) have been presented, though most have been depicted wearing Greek hoplite or Roman gladiator armor. The character's longest-running look, designed by George Pérez, is that of a red-eyed Greek warrior clad in black and indigo battle armor, face hidden by an Attic helmet. After DC's continuity was rebooted in 2011 (an event known as The New 52), the character cycled through several divergent visual interpretations (including one inspired by the physical appearance of then-writer of Wonder Woman, Brian Azzarello) before returning to his Pérez-inspired warrior design.

The character has appeared in various forms of media. He has been voiced in animation and video games by actors Alfred Molina, Fred Tatasciore, and Michael York, and portrayed on-screen in the DC Extended Universe by David Thewlis in the films Wonder Woman (2017) and Zack Snyder's Justice League (2021).

== Fictional character biography ==
=== Pre-Crisis ===
From left to right: Mars in his Golden Age, Silver Age, and Bronze Age appearances, and Ares from Wonder Woman (vol. 5) #60 (December 2018).

During most of the Golden Age, Silver Age, and Bronze Age of Comic Books, Ares was called Mars. His visual depiction remained faithful to Harry G. Peter's original design throughout the Golden and Silver Ages: a brawny, clean-shaven figure in Greco-Roman battle armor with entwined serpents emblazoned across the breastplate. In the character's first appearance, his armor was gold. Subsequent Golden Age appearances vary the armor's coloration, rendering it as bronze with green filigree, and later as pale violet with bronze filigree. Mars' Silver Age appearances maintained Peter's character design, but altered the color to gray.

His debut appearance sees Ares seeking to realize his vision of eternal war and conflict in the world of man. He is chiefly opposed by Aphrodite, goddess of love, who seeks to realize a contrary vision of eternal peace. The men who worship Ares kill each other and their weaker brothers, selling women cheaper than cattle. Taunted by Ares that she has no champions of her own, Aphrodite creates a new race of women, the Amazons, from clay. They build a city-state called Amazonia, where they create a women-centered civilization for spreading the gospel of Aphrodite's Way. Endowed by divine gifts, they soon prove stronger than Ares' followers. Hippolyta, chosen as queen, is presented with a golden girdle to make her invincible.

Ares flees to Mars (which he adopts as his new name after declaring himself ruler), establishing a citadel and enslaving its native population to serve him and his chief deputies, the Duke of Deception, the Count of Conquest and the Earl of Greed. Mars' aide-de-camp is General Destruction. He uses Mars as an interplanetary headquarters, supplementing the enslaved Martian population with the spirits of the dead he collects from war zones on multiple planets, including Saturn and Earth. The collected spirits are tested to determine whether they should be used as personal slaves, gladiators, or factory workers. The very strongest are trained and given new bodies, then sent back to their worlds as engines of war to expand Mars' influence. He also sets up the "Injustice Court" for humiliating slaves and meting out punishments. He also establishes a secret base beneath Mount Olympus, managed by the Count of Conquest.

From this base, he seeks to defeat the Allied cause in World War II, sending thoughts of conquest, deception, and greed into the Axis leaders via astral projection, but he finds himself repeatedly thwarted by the Amazonian champion Wonder Woman. When Wonder Woman rescues Steve Trevor, the War God promises to reward whichever of his lieutenants can capture her. The Earl of Greed enlists German aid and sets a trap for Wonder Woman by manipulating her friend, the Dean of Holiday College, to commit theft so Wonder Woman must rescue her. His plan fails, and an enraged Mars has him imprisoned.

The Duke of Deception gains Japanese help and captures Wonder Woman, but she escapes before she leaves Earth, and he is also humiliated and imprisoned. The Count of Conquest gains Italian help and, by trickery, succeeds in shackling Wonder Woman and Trevor and brings them to Mars. Greed and Deception are released, and Wonder Woman is set to be put to death by the Injustice Court. However, with the help of Etta Candy's spirit form, Wonder Woman escapes and overpowers Mars, whose Iron Palace is destroyed by his weapons, though he survives. The Duke of Deception makes several further attempts to exact revenge on Wonder Woman, but fails despite his cunning and incredible technology, and Mars finally strips him of his mighty appearance, showing him to be a weak, toothless man. Set to live among the female slaves, he leads them in rebellion and briefly gains the throne of Mars.

Mars repeatedly tangles with Wonder Woman on Earth-One and Earth-Two. During a period when Diana abandons her powers to live as a mortal woman while the Amazons retreat temporarily to another dimension, Mars (by now using his original name of Ares again) and his children Phobos, Deimos, and Eris engage in battle with the Amazons to gain dominion over all planes of existence but are beaten back by Hippolyta's superior leadership. Later, he enlists his human descendant Helen Alexandros to become Silver Swan.

His final scheme before the history-changing battle of Crisis on Infinite Earths is to ally with Hades and the Anti-Monitor to subdue the Gods of Olympus. While fighting Wonder Woman, he fails to stop Trevor from freeing the gods, while Hades deserts him after his wife uses love to coerce her husband to return to the Underworld. For his hubris, Ares' power is taken from him and he is cast into Tartarus, the inescapable prison of the gods.

=== Post-Crisis ===
Despite being Zeus's eldest son, Ares never fit in with the other gods of Olympus and creates his own realm, the Areopagus, from which he plots to corrupt the mortal world with violence and greed. Aphrodite persuades her fellow gods to fashion the Amazons as representatives of Olympus among men, using them to thwart Ares' vile ambitions. Through his deceit and manipulations, Ares deposes his uncle, Hades, and subsequently becomes God of the Dead.

Ares attempts to destroy the Amazons, sending his half-brother Hercules to destroy them, but Diana is born and raised just in time to fight Ares as Steve Trevor's plane, driven by one of Ares's human puppets, crashes into Paradise Island. Ares seeks to instigate a nuclear war between the United States and Russia, but Diana traps him with her magic lasso, showing how a world devoid of life would result in his own disappearance, as there would be none left to worship him. Humbled by this revelation, Ares swears to no longer interfere in Man's World so long as Diana "saves them from themselves".

Through magic, Ares transfers his essence into the body of low-level mobster Ari Buchanan and changes his name to "Ares Buchanan". He quickly becomes a powerful crime boss by dealing in high-powered weaponry to rival gangs. As Buchanan, he has a relationship with his lawyer, Donna Milton, who is Circe in disguise, although not even she knows it. Milton conceives a daughter, Lyta Milton, but when she shares the news with Ares, he expresses disgust at fathering a half-human child and shoots her. Circe, as Donna, survives and later comes to Diana's aid when Ares traps her, using the last of her magic to banish him from the mortal plane. Diana, the child, and she survive, but Circe is forced to shed her memories and life as Donna, becoming a full villain once again.

As opposed to ancient times, the roles of various gods are shown to have altered somewhat according to modern practices and beliefs. Accordingly, the faith-based power Ares's father Zeus receives proves to be very much diminished as the pagan faith of Ancient Greece gives way to Christianity. Other gods such as Athena, Aphrodite, and Ares began to gain more power due to the appearance of the computer age, love never diminishing, and conflict remaining consistent. Thus, the three godly siblings finally depose their father and take over Olympus.

Following his ascension to power, Ares formally revises his divine role as a god from "War" to "Conflict". To celebrate this change, he alters his appearance to a more approachable visage. His rule under this name proves to be short-lived, though; when Hades is defeated and forced to abandon his responsibility as keeper of the Underworld, Ares is all too eager to become God of the Dead.

==== Family reunited ====
Realizing that a crossroads for the gods of Olympus is at hand, Ares confides in his half-sister Cassie Sandsmark about a future war. In exchange for additional powers, he asks only for her love. He travels to Themyscira and kidnaps his daughter Lyta, who is under the protection of the Amazons. Circe confronts Ares and is surprised to learn of his new godly title. She agrees to remain as his consort and to raise their daughter in the Underworld.

During Ares' family bonding with Cassie, he blesses her with a powerful lasso able to expel Zeus's lightning in times of anger. Ares appears to Cassie repeatedly to warn her about "the coming war". In the "Titans Tomorrow" storyline, the Teen Titans are thrown 10 years into the future, where Cassie has inherited the mantle of Wonder Woman after Diana's death. She is also referred to as "Ares's champion".

Ares later appears to Cassie, informing her that the gods are leaving this plane and Zeus is taking the power he had granted Cassie. In exchange for acknowledging their siblinghood and becoming his champion, he offers her some of his power, saying only that she would be "more powerful than [she has] ever been". The full extent of Cassie's powers has not been revealed, though some indication exists that she has retained all of her former powers at this point.

In Amazons Attack!, it revealed that Ares left Circe and kidnapped their daughter to raise on his own. As Lyta and he were only spoken of during the storyline, their presence is yet unknown.

Cassie is confronted by Ares' son, Lord Lycus, whom Ares has sent to interfere with Cassie's powers.

==== Death ====
Shifting himself into the future, Ares steals the dead body of Wonder Woman and brings it back into the present. He manipulates several villains to use the body to create his bride and chief agent Genocide. He imbues this new creature with his own magical dominance, causing the new being's persona to be not only more deadly but completely obedient to him. Ares's plans to destroy the present-day Wonder Woman go awry when Diana destroys Genocide, leaving the monster's dead body to drown in the ocean. Angered, Ares commands a son of Poseidon to cause a swarm of deadly sea creatures to attack Themyscira and the new island nation of Thalarion. During this battle, Diana deduces that Ares is the grand manipulator and confronts him. Not allowing Ares much time to gloat in his latest masterpiece of war, Diana takes a battle axe and strikes Ares's head, splitting his helmet in two.

==== After death ====
Despite being gone from the mortal world, Ares is still manipulating events to destroy the Amazons. His next plot involves the birth of five male children by five random Amazons. Once they are born, he takes them under his wing before Ares is banished from Themyscira both in body and spirit by his father Zeus.

=== The New 52: Wonder Woman (2011–2016) ===
Ares's appearance in The New 52 continuity: panel from Wonder Woman vol. 4 #4 (2012), art by Cliff Chiang.

In The New 52 continuity, Ares is commonly referred to as War. His first appearance in this new continuity is in Wonder Woman (vol. 4) #4, where he is depicted as a bald, aged man with a white beard. Due to the revelation that Diana is the demigoddess daughter of Zeus, their new dynamic is that of half-brother and half-sister. War's calves and feet are permanently smeared with blood. He appears in a bar in Darfur, where his brother Apollo tries to convince him to side with him in his quest to take over the rein of Olympus.

He is revealed to be Diana's former mentor in Wonder Woman vol. 4 #0, a stand-alone issue published in September 2012 set in the past. He takes Diana under his tutelage because of her vast potential in combat, and teaches her the ways of the warrior. Their relationship is like a father-daughter relationship. However, they part ways when Diana is asked by Ares to slay the Minotaur, but is unable to bring herself to kill it. This show of mercy makes her a failure in Ares' eyes.

Over time, Diana learns she can trust Ares to protect their youngest brother, the infant Zeke, and his mother Zola. Alongside their British brother Lennox, Hera, and the New God Orion, they form a dysfunctional family unit that seeks to protect the baby from the First Born, their eldest brother, who had been imprisoned by Zeus eons ago. In Wonder Woman vol. 4 #23, Wonder Woman's group clashes with First Born in London, where Ares raises an army of soldiers and fights First Born himself after Wonder Woman is temporarily incapacitated. First Born overpowers Ares and prepares to kill him to usurp his position of god of war. Wonder Woman regretfully drives a spear through both of them, as it is the only way to stop First Born. In his last breath, Ares forgives and commends his former pupil, stating that she did what he would have done. Hades manifests to take Ares to his afterlife, and announces that Wonder Woman has taken on his position as god of war. Appearing to Wonder Woman in an apparition, counselling her on the ongoing conflict with the First Born, he tells her not to call him War anymore, as that is her name—she refers to him instead as Ares.

=== DC Rebirth: Wonder Woman (2016–present) ===
In the DC Rebirth reboot, Wonder Woman's origin is retold in the "Year One" storyline. A group of people called the "Sear" terrorizes a mall where Diana and her friends are exploring. They have been infected with the Maru virus, which causes them to lash out in homicidal rage, though Diana and Steve Trevor defeat them, and Barbara Ann Minerva discovers Sear is an anagram of Ares.

The god of war attacks shortly after this discovery. He reveals his desire to spread the virus across the world in major locations with the hope of turning most of the human population into warring killers to fuel his power. Diana offers him Themyscira's location in exchange for him sparing everyone, though Ares discovers she has no memory of its location; as a sacrifice of leaving the island, Diana was barred from returning by losing knowledge of how to return. Accepting her new role to save mankind, Diana, with the help of the patron gods in animal form, subdues Ares with the Lasso of Truth. Diana and her friends are given the locations where Ares has the virus sent and Diana is christened as Wonder Woman for her heroics.

Soon after, Ares' sons Phobos and Deimos conspire to free Ares from his imprisonment on Themyscira. They coerce Veronica Cale into aiding them by kidnapping the soul of her daughter, Isadore. Several years later, Cale and her associate Doctor Cyber still have no luck finding the island. Cale plots against Phobos and Deimos, and he recruits the sorceress Circe into trapping the twins into the bodies of two Doberman Pinschers.

Years later, the mysterious tree that had been growing on Themyscira is teleported to the false island that Wonder Woman had originally thought was her home. During a battle with Cheetah, a drop of Wonder Woman's blood opens a portal to inside the tree. There, Wonder Woman and Veronica Cale encounter both Isadore Cale and an attractive, nude man who introduces himself as Ares. Diana had not faced Ares in Year One, but his sons in disguise. Themyscira serves as Ares' prison once he is calmed of his bloodlust with the love of Aphrodite, and Phobos and Deimos plot to gain access to kill their father and take his role, gaining his power. The gods alter Diana's memories to make her think she has returned to the island so she could never try to find the real Themyscira, thereby granting access to darker forces. Isadore becomes his ward in the meantime. He gives her the clue to how to defeat his sons: with love, not hatred. Once his sons have been defeated and bound by the Lasso of Truth, Ares reveals Isadore cannot leave without being split from her physical and astral forms. She can live with the Amazons, however, and thus have a life where she will not age.

Later, Darkseid's daughter Grail is imprisoned in the tree with Ares. Ares, inspired by the hope of justice, manipulates Grail into killing him with the Godkiller sword. This frees him of his imprisonment. Soon after, Wonder Woman encounters Ares, this time resembling the missing Steve Trevor, on a battlefield in Durkovia.

== Powers and abilities ==
As do all Olympian gods, Ares possesses tremendous strength, though he is now perhaps the strongest of them, rivaled only by his half-brother Hercules. Moreover, he is a master of conflict and strategy with centuries of experience in the field, and has complete telekinetic command and mastery over any weapon or armor. He also possesses speed equal to that of Hermes once he absorbs massive amounts of the violent energies that give him his powers. Pertaining to his being a war god, violent actions and emotions such as anger, hate, death and bloodshed make him stronger and heal any wounds he may receive, as his soul is able to absorb the psychic energy created by such events. His armor is virtually indestructible and his weapons are greater than mortal ones. He can shapeshift into any form he wishes and can teleport himself and others. At one time, he was also recognized as the Death God of the Greek Pantheon, having control over the dead and able to resurrect and command a whole army of undead from the Underworld to do his will, and then send them back whenever he wished. Being a god, he is immortal and can only be harmed by magical weapons.

In The New 52 continuity, the character's mere presence invokes battle and slaughter in his surroundings. This is seen in Wonder Woman vol. 4 #4, where Ares is sitting in a bar in Darfur; all the men inside are dead and a riot is breaking out outside the bar – even children are taking part in the gunfire. In Wonder Woman vol. 4 #9, Ares is present at a café in Damascus, where a fatal blast takes place as he is leaving.

== Other versions ==
- An alternate universe version of Ares appears in Wonder Woman: Earth One. This version is Hippolyta's father and seeks to eliminate the Amazons in retaliation for her turning against him centuries prior. During a fight between the Amazons, Ares mentally links with one of his drones to battle Wonder Woman before being killed by her.
- Ares appears in Sensation Comics Featuring Wonder Woman.
- The Merciless, an alternate universe version of Batman from Earth -12 who wields Ares' helmet, appears in Dark Nights: Metal and Dark Nights: Death Metal.

== In other media ==
=== Television ===
- Ares appears in the Justice League Unlimited episode "Hawk and Dove", voiced by Michael York.
- Ares makes a non-speaking appearance in the Harley Quinn episode "Bachelorette" as an exotic dancer on Hedonikka, an island near Themyscira.

=== Film ===
- Ares appears in Wonder Woman (2009), voiced by Alfred Molina. This version previously waged war against Queen Hippolyta with his son Thrax, during which Thrax was killed and Ares was rendered mortal and imprisoned on Themyscira. In the present, he escapes and regains his full power before Wonder Woman kills him.
- Ares appears in films set in the DC Extended Universe (DCEU), portrayed by David Thewlis.
  - First appearing in Wonder Woman (2017), this version is the treacherous son of Zeus and half-brother of Diana Prince / Wonder Woman. In the past, Ares attempted to influence mankind towards destruction and slaughtered his fellow Olympians, but a dying Zeus cast him from Mount Olympus, stranding him in the mortal world, and gave the Amazons the "god-killer" sword to slay Ares should he ever return. Despite this, Ares spent the intervening centuries orchestrating wars and conflicts to cause mankind's self-destruction. During World War I, he masquerades as Imperial War Cabinet speaker "Sir Patrick Morgan" (also portrayed by Thewlis) to manipulate the Allies and the Central Powers into entering more conflicts. Upon learning of Ares' actions, Prince confronts Ares, who destroys the god-killer and attempts to persuade her to join him. However, she realizes love, not hate, is the only way to prevent conflict and eventually kills Ares.
  - Ares appears in a flashback in Justice League, physically portrayed by uncredited stuntman Nick McKinless with Thewlis' face superimposed on top of his. He and the Olympians join forces with the Amazons, Atlanteans, mankind, and a Green Lantern to battle Steppenwolf's forces. In the director's cut, Ares defeats a young Darkseid.

=== Video games ===
- Ares appears in DC Universe Online.
- Ares appears as a playable character in Injustice: Gods Among Us, voiced by J. G. Hertzler. This version is a reluctant ally of Batman's Insurgency who opposes the rule of Superman's One Earth Regime because the lack of global conflicts has caused Ares' powers to diminish.
- Ares appears as a character summon in Scribblenauts Unmasked: A DC Comics Adventure.
- Ares appears as a playable character in DC Legends.
- Ares appears as a playable character in DC Unchained.
- Ares appears as a playable character in Lego DC Super-Villains, voiced by Fred Tatasciore.
- Ares appears in Justice League: Cosmic Chaos, voiced by Rick D. Wasserman.

=== Miscellaneous ===
- Ares appears in DC Super Hero Girls, voiced by Fred Tatasciore.
- The Injustice incarnation of Ares appears in the Injustice: Gods Among Us prequel comic. He mocks Wonder Woman's decision to join Superman's Regime, but she counters him with her knowledge that the alliance will weaken Ares. After attacking Wonder Woman, Ares is defeated by Superman and loses a hand. Years later, he secretly allies with Darkseid and strikes a deal with Batman's Insurgency, promising help from the Olympians in the latter's war against Superman and freeing Billy Batson to join the ensuing fight. Following this, Ares convinces Superman to ally with Poseidon, who nearly destroys Themyscira. However, Batman travels to New Genesis and convinces Highfather to intervene, leading to the latter convincing Zeus to end his and the Olympians' involvement in Batman and Superman's war. Afterward, Superman takes Ares to Apokolips to be tortured by Darkseid.
- The Injustice incarnation of Ares makes a cameo appearance in the Injustice 2 prequel comic, in which he taunts an imprisoned Wonder Woman with the future events of the game.
- Ares appears in DC x Sonic the Hedgehog: Metal Legion. He makes a cameo in the third issue, where he and Shade encounter Zor of the Deadly Six.

=== Merchandise ===
- Ares received an action figure in DC Direct's Amazons and Adversaries line in 2001.
- Ares received an action figure in Mattel's DC Universe Classics line in 2008.
- Ares received an action figure in the Wonder Woman (2017) tie-in toy line.
- Ares received a figure in Lego's "Wonder Woman Warrior Battle" set.

== See also ==
- Ares (Marvel Comics)
- Children of Ares
