= Zola (DC Comics) =

- Zola as she appears in Wonder Woman (vol. 4) #1 (2011), art by Cliff Chiang.

Publication information
- Publisher: DC Comics
- First appearance: Wonder Woman (vol. 4) #1 (September 2011)
- Created by: Brian Azzarello, Cliff Chiang

In-story information
- Species: Human
- Supporting character of: Wonder Woman

Zola is a fictional DC Comics character, created by writer Brian Azzarello and artist Cliff Chiang. She first appeared in Wonder Woman (vol. 4) #1 (September 2011), and since then as played an integral part in the series. Zola is featured as a young woman carrying Zeus' child, thus entering dangerous situations, the first one being of Hera aiming to punish her for sleeping with her husband. Wonder Woman takes Zola under her protection and tries to fight off forces that might try to harm her or her baby. Zola was a ploy used by Athena to make herself a human to restore Zeus to the throne of Olympus by mating and giving birth to him as a human. She is a young woman and a mother to Zeke, a child of Zeus.

== Fictional character biography ==
First appearing in Wonder Woman (vol. 4) #1, Zola is portrayed as a young blonde woman who lives and owns a barn in Virginia. Her barn is visited by Hera, who silently enters the stable and transforms two horses into centaurs. Inside the barn house, Zola is seen aiming her shotgun at the god Hermes, whom she believes to be a house invader. Hermes tries to reason with her and informs her that they must leave the house as her life is in danger but Zola refuses to hear him until they are attacked by the centaurs. A projectile thrown by one of the centaurs pierces Hermes, but he manages to throw Zola a key which instantly transports her to an apartment in London when she touches it. The resident of the apartment is revealed to be Wonder Woman, who asks Zola to call her by her real name Diana, and agrees to help her, asking her for the key. Instead of letting Wonder Woman go alone, Zola transports herself to the barn with her, where she fights the centaurs and protects Zola at the same time. After the centaurs' defeat, Hermes reveals that Zola is pregnant with Zeus' child and that her life is important.

Wonder Woman takes Zola and Hermes to her home Paradise Island, where Hermes narrates the apparent birth story of Diana to Zola, that she was sculpted out of clay by her mother Queen Hippolyta and granted life by the Gods. The presence of the trio on the island directs Hera's wrath towards it, who sends her cruel and bloodlusted daughter Strife down. Strife uses her powers to cause chaos and discord amongst the Amazons, who battle each other and end up slaughtering many of their own kind. Strife even reveals Diana's own true parentage to her, that Hippolyta conceived Diana when she slept with Zeus after a long battle, making Diana one of Zeus' many illegitimate offspring, like Zola's baby. This leaves Diana heartbroken, who along with Zola, Hermes and Strife returns to London, and chooses never to return to the island. Zola later discusses with Diana her meaning of home, saying that "it's just a word"; Zola also tells Diana that her father has been in jail ever since her birth. She further tells Diana that she never forgave her mother, who made mistakes too, and never got the chance to reconcile with her, as she died before she even could. This prompts Diana to reconcile with her mother, who arrives only to find that Hera has already exacted her revenge on Hippolyta for sleeping with her husband, turning her into stone and the other Amazons into snakes.

In an attempt to get back on Hera, Wonder Woman, with the help of another half-mortal scion of Zeus, Lennox Sandsmark, hatches a plan, in which they try to convince Poseidon and Hades, Zeus' brothers, to collectively rule Olympus in their brother's apparent absence. This deal angers Hera, who comes down and argues that the throne is for her to rule. Due to Hera being present on Earth at that time, Wonder Woman transports to her domain and destroys Hera's pool, which she uses to observe and watch over her enemies, thus making it no longer possible for her to know about Zola's whereabouts. While Poseidon is amused by the fake deal Wonder Woman and her allies made, Hades feels insulted and captures Zola and takes her to hell, saying that he will not release her until Diana fulfils her side of the deal.

Wonder Woman mounts a mission to rescue Zola from Hades, and takes Eros' pistols (which cause the people they shoot to fall in love) to help her succeed. Along with Hermes, Diana enters Hell and finds Zola. Diana makes a barter with Hades, exchanging Zola for Eros' pistols. Hades agrees and hands over Zola to Diana and Hermes. As they exit Hell, Hades shoots the pistols at Diana, who is shot through her heart, and bound to stay in Hades. Zola, who is desperate to help Diana, is taken back forcefully by Hermes. Lennox, Hephaestus and Eros later journeyed to Hell and rescued Diana.

Zola's life would again be put to risk later when Apollo begins targeting her baby on the basis of a prophecy, which says that one of Zeus' children will rule Olympus and kill Apollo, who he believes his Zola's baby. Apollo, along with his twin sister Artemis, attack Wonder Woman, Lennox and Hermes, and Apollo manages to capture Zola and take her to Olympus. Hera strikes a deal with Apollo, exchanging Zola for the Throne of Olympus. However, Wonder Woman and Hermes arrive in time to save Zola, and battle the twins again. During the battle, Hera throws Zola off from the edge of the mountain, but is saved by Wonder Woman. Wonder Woman then sends Zola to Earth along with Hermes. There, Zola delivers the baby, but the baby is stolen by the traitorous Hermes and is given to Demeter, leaving her heartbroken. Wonder Woman meanwhile strikes a deal with Apollo, saying that Apollo must leave Zola and her baby alone, or she will personally see to it that the prophecy is fulfilled. This is agreed on the condition that if the child referred to in the prophecy turns out to be Zola's baby, Diana must kill the child herself. Returning to Earth, she finds a weeping Zola, and after learning about Hermes' actions, she promises Zola that she will rescue her child and bring Hermes to justice.
