= Hades (DC Comics) =

DC Comics character

- The Rebirth-era Hades as depicted in Future State: Wonder Woman #2. Art by Joëlle Jones.

Publication information
- Publisher: DC Comics
- First appearance: Wonder Woman (volume 1) #16 (1946)
- Created by: William Moulton Marston, Harry G. Peter, Joye Hummel

In-story information
- Species: Olympian God
- Team affiliations: Gods of Olympus
- Notable aliases: Pluto, Hell
- Abilities: Immortality; Vast mystical abilities

Hades (also sometimes Pluto or Hell) is a fictional character appearing in DC Comics publications and related media, commonly as an adversary and sometimes-ally of the superhero Wonder Woman. This character is based upon the eponymous Greek mythological figure, he is the Olympian god of the dead and ruler of the underworld.

Hades has appeared in various media outside comics, primarily in association with Wonder Woman. John Rhys-Davies, Bob Joles, and Oliver Platt have voiced the character in animated series and films.

== Publication history ==
Pluto (the Golden Age Hades) in Wonder Woman #16 (March 1946); art by Harry G. Peter.

Hades first appeared under his Roman name Pluto in Wonder Woman #16 published in the summer of 1946, written by Wonder Woman creator William Moulton Marston. In this story, he kidnaps women from Earth, using them to decorate his castle on the planet Pluto, before being defeated by Wonder Woman and her allies. He would next encounter Wonder Woman in a 1962 Silver Age adventure in issue #131 of her monthly title, in which the hero ventures underground into Hades (referred to in-story as "the Underworld") at the behest of her mother Hippolyta, battling Cerberus along the way and cannily avoiding a skirmish with Pluto's ghostly subjects. In 1978's Adventure Comics #460, Wonder Woman once again undertakes a journey to Pluto's realm (referred to both as "the Land of the Dead" and "Hell") to retrieve Steve Trevor's soul. Here, Pluto is depicted with Mephistophelian features, including devil horns and red skin.

in Wonder Woman #329, the character is renamed Hades as part of writer Mindy Newell's move to standardize the use of Greek names for DC's Olympian pantheon. He is re-introduced as a more benevolent character, again named Hades, in writer/artist George Pérez's post-Crisis reboot of the Wonder Woman mythos in 1987. Yet another version of the character would debut in 2011 as part of DC Comics’ New 52 publication event, which again revised Wonder Woman’s continuity. This incarnation, referred to primarily as Hell and sometimes as Hades, presents the character not as an adult man, but as a young boy in black and red armor whose head is crowned with melting candles.

== Fictional character biography ==
As in classical mythology, Hades is a member of the Olympian gods, the immortal children of the Titans Cronus and Rhea. Along with his brothers Zeus and Poseidon, he ruled a significant portion of the ancient world. As the god of the Underworld, Hades had dominion over the spirits of the dead. His realm was divided into four sub-sections: Tartarus (abode of the damned), the Asphodel Fields (a misty after-world), the Elysian Fields (where the righteous dwell) and the Isle of the Blessed (the paradisal resting place of those deemed great heroes). Hades rules these realms with his niece and queen Persephone.

=== Pre-Crisis ===
The late-Bronze Age Hades in Wonder Woman (vol. 1) #329 (February 1986); art by Don Heck.

Hades does not figure frequently in the adventures of Wonder Woman until the end of the first volume, when the Anti-Monitor tricks him into making a pact with Ares to conquer Olympus. The plot is thwarted when Persephone (referred to in-story as Kore), inspired by the love between Wonder Woman and Steve Trevor, confesses her love for Hades. Hades pulls out of the scheme and Trevor frees the gods while Wonder Woman battles Ares.

=== Post-Crisis ===
The Modern Age Hades in Wonder Woman (vol. 2) #216 (May 2005); art by Rags Morales.

Due to Darkseid's manipulation, the Olympian gods are split into separate entities for many years, existing as both their Greek and Roman variations. Hades' Roman counterpart Pluto rules his own dimensional variant of the Underworld, occasionally coming into conflict with his "brother". The pantheons eventually rejoin more centuries later.

Hades once collaborated with Ares and Anti-Monitor in their attack on Mount Olympus and the Amazons. Wonder Woman helped to repel the attacks.

Dream in his Morpheus alias once persuaded Hades and Persephone to allow Orpheus an audience when he came to the Greek underworld to retrieve Persephone.

Hades shared a sometimes tense relationship with Wonder Woman's people, the Amazons of Themyscira. The Amazons had been appointed to guard an entryway to his realm, Doom's Doorway, behind which were trapped many monsters and undead abominations. Over the centuries, many Amazons lost their lives when the Doorway was occasionally breached. Despite their loss, the Amazons always attempted to show proper respect to the lord of the underworld, as one of the honored gods of their faith. They even built a large tabernacle to the God of the Dead which carried its own priestess who served a 1,000 years before being replaced by another. In time, most of the gods' followers died off or ceased to believe, leaving the Amazons an important part of Hades and the Olympians' continued existence.

Like her Amazon sisters, Wonder Woman has often had an uneasy relationship with Hades. Early in her career, she descended through Doom's Doorway, slaying most of the monsters and freeing her people from their terrible burden. On other occasions, she has journeyed to the Underworld to request a boon from its ruler or to free the soul of a slain comrade, such as the Amazon Artemis and the murdered Messenger god Hermes, which she succeeded in.

For most of his life, Hades clothed himself in a classical Greek toga and wore his black hair in ringlets. In recent years, however, many of the gods adopted modern clothing in an attempt to evolve with the times. Hades took to dressing in a dark black suit with top hat and cane, similar to that of a Victorian era Undertaker.

While Athena assumed the throne of Mount Olympus from her deposed father Zeus, Ares seemingly killed Hades and took over the Underworld. As it was revealed that Olympian gods do not truly die, only become citizens of the underworld, Hades' presence may still be evoked.

The new Olympian order of rule was again changed when the New Gods of Apokolips captured the Olympian pantheon and tampered with their memories. Hence, the current ruler of the Olympian underworld is still in question. This is further compounded by Ares' recent demise at the hands of Wonder Woman, putting the question of Olympian Underworld rulership in a greater state of confusion.

=== The New 52 ===
The New 52-era Hades in Wonder Woman (vol. 5) #16 (May 2012); art by Cliff Chiang.

In The New 52 rebooted DC's continuity, Hades appears to be but a child with pasty white skin, a dark suit of armor and most unusually a number of candles where the melted wax obscures most of his face above the nose. As a more modern name for himself he tells Lennox to call him "Hell". He is still the ruler of the underworld and the dead, but his realm and everything in it is now an extension of his essence.

Hades suffers a degree of self-hatred, as his realm (and by extension, himself) is filled with suffering. Hades has difficulty appreciating and expressing his own values, even if he tries to flatter occasionally. This includes going so far as refusing to believe it is possible for a Lasso-ensnared Diana to be capable of loving everyone, including him.

Though Diana wishes to aid him, Hades refuses to be aided, leaving Diana to shoot him with one of the Pistols of Eros while he is looking at his own reflection, and the bullet should make him fall in love with the first person he sees.

== In other media ==
=== Television ===
Hades as he appears in Justice League.

- Hades appears in series set in the DC Animated Universe (DCAU):
  - Hades appears in the Justice League two-part episode "Paradise Lost", voiced by John Rhys-Davies. This version is a former lover of Hippolyta who was sentenced to eternal torment and imprisonment ruling Tartarus after a failed attempt to overthrow Zeus during the Titanomachy.
  - Hades returns in the Justice League Unlimited episode "The Balance", voiced by Bob Joles. After being overthrown by Felix Faust, Hades joins forces with Wonder Woman and Shayera Hol to reclaim his throne. He additionally claims to have helped sculpt the former from clay.
- Hades appears in The Sandman (2022) episode "The Song of Orpheus", portrayed by Garry Cooper.

=== Film ===
Hades appears in Wonder Woman, voiced by Oliver Platt. This version is overweight and employs the spirits of the dead as personal servants.

=== Video games ===
- Hades appears in DC Universe Online, voiced by Mike MacRea.
- Hades appears as a character summon in Scribblenauts Unmasked: A DC Comics Adventure.

=== Miscellaneous ===
- Hades appears in Smallville Season 11: Olympus. After being imprisoned by Zeus, he became angry and resentful over not being able to see Olympus again. In the present, he strikes a deal with Felix Faust and Mister Bones, promising them immortality in exchange for freeing him.
- Hades appears in The Sandman (2020), voiced by Toby Longworth.
- Hades appears in DC x Sonic the Hedgehog: Metal Legion. In the first issue, Hades leads an army of undead to attack Themyscira, until he and his army are defeated by Wonder Woman and her fellow Amazons with the aid of Amy Rose.
