= Wonder Woman (2009 film) =

2009 film directed by Lauren Montgomery

- Blu-ray cover
- Directed by: Lauren Montgomery
- Screenplay by: Michael Jelenic
- Story by: Gail Simone; Michael Jelenic
- Based on: Wonder Woman: Gods and Mortals by George Pérez, Greg Potter, and Len Wein
- Produced by: Bruce Timm
- Starring: Keri Russell; Nathan Fillion; Alfred Molina; Rosario Dawson; Marg Helgenberger; Oliver Platt; Virginia Madsen
- Music by: Christopher Drake
- Production companies: Warner Premiere; DC Comics; Warner Bros. Animation
- Distributed by: Warner Home Video
- Release date: March 3, 2009
- Running time: 73 minutes
- Country: United States
- Language: English

Wonder Woman is a 2009 American animated superhero film focusing on the DC Comics character Wonder Woman. Its plot is loosely based on George Pérez's reboot of the character, specifically the "Gods and Mortals" arc that started Wonder Woman's second volume in 1987. It is the fourth film of the DC Universe Animated Original Movies released by Warner Premiere and Warner Bros. Animation on March 3, 2009.

The film is directed by Lauren Montgomery, and written by Gail Simone and Michael Jelenic. As with all previous releases in this line of films, it is produced by Bruce Timm.

== Plot ==
In ancient times, the Amazons, a fierce race of warrior women, battle Ares, the god of war, and his army. During the battle, the Amazons' queen Hippolyta beheads Ares' son Thrax, whom the god forcibly conceived with her. She is about to kill Ares, when Zeus stops her. Instead, Ares is bound with magic bracers which deprive him of his ability to draw power from the violence and death he can instigate. In compensation for their years of forced servitude to Ares, the Amazons are granted the island of Themyscira by Hera, where they remain eternally youthful and isolated from Man, while holding Ares prisoner. Hippolyta is also granted a daughter, Diana, whom she shapes from Themyscirian sand and gives life with her own blood.

Over a millennium later, Diana is unsatisfied with her life on Themyscira and longs to explore the outside world. American fighter pilot Steve Trevor is shot down in a dogfight and crash-lands his plane on the island. He then meets Diana, starting a fight. Once defeated, he is taken to the Amazons. After interrogating him with a magical golden lasso, the lasso of truth, Hippolyta decides he is not an enemy. As such, their tradition dictates that an emissary be tasked to ensure his safe return to Man's world. Diana volunteers, but her mother argues that she has not enough experience in dealing with the dangers outside Themyscira. Diana is instead assigned to guard Ares' cell; her bookish but kind-hearted friend Alexa offers to cover for her. Defying her mother, Diana disguises herself with a helmet and participates in contests of strength, ultimately winning the right to escort Steve home.

Meanwhile, the Amazon Persephone, seduced by Ares, kills Alexa and releases him. Diana brings Steve in his repaired and now invisible jet to New York City, where he volunteers to help her capture Ares. Together they uncover a pattern of violence created by Ares' presence. The pair goes out to a bar and, after some heavy drinking, Steve makes a pass at Diana. While arguing outside, they are attacked by the demigod Deimos. Diana subdues Deimos, who kills himself to avoid interrogation. His death leads Diana and Steve to a concealed gateway to the underworld guarded by members of the cult of Ares.

There, Diana attempts to take Ares down. He summons harpies that attack Diana, prompting Steve to save her. Performing a sacrificial ritual, Ares opens a gate to the Underworld, where he persuades his uncle Hades to remove the bracers. Hades agrees, but does not tell his nephew that the ultimate cost of removing them would be his own death in combat. Later, Diana wakes up in a hospital, furious that Steve saved her instead of stopping Ares. Steve defends his actions, revealing how much he cares about her in the process.

Ares and his army attack Washington, D.C.; Steve and Diana start battling him and are soon joined by the Amazons. Ares summons long-dead Amazons from the Underworld to fight their sisters. Alexa, now an undead warrior, reveals to her sister Artemis a chant which nullifies Ares' control. The undead turn on Ares, but are destroyed by his power. Hippolyta kills Persephone in combat. With her dying breath, Persephone declares that by shutting the Amazons away from Man's world, Hippolyta has denied them the happiness that comes with love and a family.

Meanwhile, Ares' influence reaches the President of the United States, who orders a nuclear missile against Themyscira, assuming the island is attacking Washington. This act of aggression increases Ares' power. With the invisible jet, Steve shoots down the missile just before it hits the island. After taking a brutal beating at Ares' hands, Diana finally beheads him. She later accepts Steve, and the two share a kiss. Ares is condemned to the underworld to attend Hades as a slave.

On Themyscira, in memory of Alexa, Artemis takes up reading. Realizing that Diana misses both Man's world and Steve, Hippolyta gives her the task of being a channel for "communication between men and women". Diana returns to New York, enjoying the company of Steve and becoming the newly christened Wonder Woman.

== Cast ==
- Keri Russell as Diana Prince / Wonder Woman
- Nathan Fillion as Steve Trevor
- Alfred Molina as Ares
- Rosario Dawson as Artemis
- Marg Helgenberger as Hera
- Oliver Platt as Hades
- Virginia Madsen as Hippolyta
- Skye Arens as Little Girl
- John DiMaggio as Deimos (credited), Homeless Man (uncredited)
- Julianne Grossman as Etta Candy
- Vicki Lewis as Persephone
- David McCallum as Zeus
- Jason Miller as Thrax (credited), Gang Leader (uncredited)
- Rick Overton as Slick (credited), the President of the United States (uncredited)
- Andrea Romano as President's Advisor
- Tara Strong as Alexa
- Bruce Timm as Attacker

== Production ==
The film was originally advertised as having a storyline involving the Greek god Ares escaping Paradise Island to obtain a mystical item called the Hand of Rage, which he would use to bring about World War III. This storyline was later dropped.

The film's casting director Andrea Romano explained that Keri Russell's casting as Wonder Woman was partly inspired by Romano seeing Russell's performance in the film Waitress.

According to producer Bruce Timm, during post-production, many action scenes had to be edited after the first cut of the film received an R rating from the MPAA.

== Soundtrack ==
Wonder Woman (Soundtrack from the DC Universe Animated Original Movie)

Film score (Digital download) by Christopher Drake
- Released: February 23, 2010
- Length: 54:00
- Labels: WaterTower Music (digital); La-La Land Records (CD)

No.	Title	Length
1.	"The Battle / Origins"	8:52
2.	"Sparring"	0:42
3.	"Ares Imprisoned"	1:29
4.	"Dog Fight, Part I"	1:48
5.	"Dog Fight, Part II"	1:58
6.	"Crash Landing"	1:06
7.	"Manhunt"	2:01
8.	"Let The Games Begin"	1:22
9.	"Persephone's Betrayal"	1:08
10.	"Bracelets and Arrows"	3:41
11.	"Computer Room"	0:48
12.	"Alley Thugs"	1:27
13.	"Deimos"	2:58
14.	"At The Gates Of Tartarus"	4:30
15.	"Cept Hemo Laudus ="	1:01
16.	"Hades"	3:35
17.	"Ospedale and Ares Rally"	1:10
18.	"DC Battle"	6:13
19.	"Ares' End"	2:56
20.	"She Misses Him"	1:00
21.	"A New Nemesis"	0:37
22.	"Wonder Woman End Titles"	3:03

== Promotion ==
DC Comics gave out promotional light-up tiaras to those who attended the premiere of the film at WonderCon 2009.

Upon the DVD release of the film, DC Comics arranged for several promotional packaging concepts to be released through different vendors. Working together with Mattel, they created a miniature action figure of the animated Wonder Woman that was packaged together with the 2-disc DVD sets sold through Best Buy's stores. Images of the animated Wonder Woman were made into sheets of temporary tattoos and packaged with the single disc DVD of the film that were sold exclusively through Kmart's stores. FYE and Suncoast retail stores sold pre-orders of the DVD with a promotional film poster containing a printed autograph of the film's director Lauren Montgomery. The two-disc special edition DVDs sold at Target stores included bonus Wonder Woman centric episodes from the Justice League animated series and its sequel Justice League Unlimited, two shows produced by Bruce Timm. Borders offered an exclusive "Making of Wonder Woman" booklet featuring storyboards and character designs. Finally, a lenticular cover was created for the DVD cover depicting Wonder Woman shifting her position, sold exclusively through Wal-Mart stores.

== Critical reception ==
From its previews at WonderCon and New York Comic Con to its DVD release Wonder Woman received mostly positive reviews. According to the review aggregator website Rotten Tomatoes, 85% of critics have given the film a positive review based on 13 reviews, with an average rating of 7.1/10. Harry Knowles gave a positive review of Wonder Woman on his website Ain't It Cool News. Knowles enthusiastically lauded director Montgomery and the surprising brutality of the action scenes. Jim Vejvoda of IGN praised the film's humor, action, and vocal performances, singling out the "perfectly cast" Fillion. Jordan Hoffman of UGO.com gave a positive review, commenting on the film's sharp dialogue, and its provocative visual style. Reviewing the film for Comic Book Resources, Josh Wigler gave a positive review, but criticized the unexplained inclusion of Diana's invisible plane. An explanation was left out as Timm and Montgomery felt it was too convoluted and merely pseudo-scientific. The World's Finest cited a few inconsistencies but said overall it was "easily the best DC Universe Animated Original Movie title to date."

The level of violence in the film – in one sequence, Steve Trevor is shown killing human adversaries while Wonder Woman uses extreme force, and several beheadings in battle also occur – garnered some criticism. Chris Mautner, reviewing the film for Comic Book Resources, remarked, "Is it just me or does it seem more than a bit...unnecessary?".

According to The-Numbers.com, Wonder Woman ranked No. 5 in DVD sales from its release of March 3 to 8, 2009. From the total units of 106,342, it made $2,040,703 in sales. The film has currently earned a total of $9,910,589 from domestic home video sales.

== Novelization ==
An adaptation of the film, entitled simply Wonder Woman, was published in January 2009 by Pocket Star Books, an imprint of Simon & Schuster (ISBN 978-1-4165-9873-2). Written by S.D. Perry and Britta Dennison, the book largely follows the film's plot, but omits some of the incidental violence (Steve Trevor killing guards, for example) featured in the film.

== Cancelled sequel ==
Bruce Timm expressed interest in making a sequel of this film, like a sequel to Green Lantern: First Flight, but ultimately the project was cancelled due to the slower sales of the film.
