= Hercules (DC Comics) =

DC Comics character

- Hercules in Wonder Woman #32 (December 2017). Art by Carlo Pagulayan and Jason Paz.

Publication information
- Publisher: DC Comics
- First appearance: All Star Comics #8 (January 1942)
- Created by: William Moulton Marston; H. G. Peter

In-story information
- Alter ego: Heracles or Hercules
- Place of origin: Olympus
- Team affiliations: Olympian Gods
- Notable aliases: Harold Campion, Champion, Wonder Man
- Abilities: God-like strength, speed, stamina, durability, agility, reflexes, and senses; Immortality; Expert hand-to-hand combatant, archer, and swordsman

Hercules (also known as Heracles and Herakles) is a fictional Olympian god in the DC Universe based on the Greek demigod and hero of the same name. Hercules is also the son of Zeus and the half-brother of the superhero Wonder Woman.

Hercules first appears in All Star Comics #8 (January 1942) as part of a Wonder Woman story, and was created by William Moulton Marston and Harry G. Peter, in the first of several incarnations. Later versions appeared in Superman #28 (May 1966), created by Jerry Siegel and Ira Yarbrough, Wonder Woman #105 (April 1967) and Hercules Unbound #1 (October 1975) created by Gerry Conway and José Luis García-López.

== Fictional character biography ==
=== Pre-Crisis on Infinite Earths ===
Hercules Unbound #1, by José Luis García-López.

Hercules is shown as a muscle-bound man wearing a lion-skin. The Amazons are slaves to Hercules, who is able to escape by tricking Hippolyta (spelled 'Hippolyte' in the original issue) into giving him her golden girdle on the bequest of Ares (referred to as 'Mars', the Roman version of the war god) who hates the Amazons. Centuries later, a picture of him, during Wonder Woman's time, shows him as the God of Strength with black hair and a beard.

In the pages of All-Star Comics #8 (published in January 1942), Hercules appears alongside other characters from Greek mythology in the first appearance of Wonder Woman. Hercules is depicted as a brutish 'hero' who represents masculine violence, and one of his 12 labors is to enslave the Amazons under Queen Hippolyte. "In the days of Ancient Greece", relates Hyppolyte to her daughter, "we Amazons were the foremost nation in the world. In Amazonia, women ruled and all was not well. Then one day, Hercules, the strongest man in the world, stung by taunts that he couldn't conquer the Amazon women, selected his strongest and fiercest warriors and landed on our shores. I challenged him to personal combat -- because I knew that with my MAGIC GIRDLE, given me by Aphrodite, Goddess of Love, I could not lose. And win I did! But Hercules, by deceit and trickery, managed to escape my evil clutches--and soon we Amazons were taken into slavery. And Aphrodite, angry at me for having succumbed to the wiles of men, would do naught to help us! Finally our submission to men became unbearable -- we could stand it no longer -- and I appealed to the Goddess Aphrodite again. This time not in vain, for she relented and with her help, I secured the MAGIC GIRDLE from Hercules. With the Magic Girdle in my possession, it didn't take us long to overcome our masters, the MEN -- and taking from them their entire fleet, we set sail for another shore, for it was Aphrodite's condition that we leave the man-made world and establish a new world of our own!"

Subsequently, in Wonder Woman (first series) #1, cover-dated summer 1967, the episode is recapped. Hercules is written as "The God of Strength" who "was half-mortal and half-God! When a mere child, he strangled two fierce serpents sent to slay him. He performed twelve labors requiring prodigious strength and upon his earthly death, was taken to Mount Olympus to dwell among the Gods ever after" (Wonder Woman #1, 1968). Thus, in his first appearance, Hercules has already finished his heroic deeds and has ascended to the status of a god. The same issue reiterates Hercules' deception and subsequent enslavement of the Amazons, this time being said to have been spurred on by the God of War, Mars, whose swordsmen "slew their weaker brothers and plundered them" and sold women as slaves "cheaper than cattle". When Aphrodite creates her race of Amazons to overcome Mars' slaves, the God of War "inspired Hercules, strongest man in the world, to make war on the Amazons". This Hercules is portrayed as a drunken, brutish warrior in his lion-skin, as mentioned above, who is determined to "take the magic girdle" of Hippolyte, challenging the Queen of the Amazons in personal combat. Upon being defeated by Hippolyte, he is given the chance "to return home and leave" but he conspires to "make love to her and steal the magic girdle" instead. Hercules feigns surrender and woos Hippolyte with his promise of "eternal friendship", while his comrades make merry with the Amazons. Once he seduces Hippolyte to remove the magic girdle, he and his men proceed to bind the prisoners, loot Amazonia and enslave the Amazons. It is not until the intervention of the Goddess Aphrodite that Hippolyte is able to recover her girdle and best the brutish 'hero' of Man's World. She takes her Amazons and leaves the world of men to form Paradise Island. Thus, this original appearance of Hercules subverts the heroic archetype, whose machoism is used to deconstruct traditional stories about heroism.

'Hercules' is also used several times in allusion in both Superman and Wonder Woman comics to allude to feats of strength. In Action Comics #7, cover-dated December 1938, Superman is said to be "A Modern Day Hercules"; while in Sensation Comics #2, (cover-dated February 1967) he is mentioned to compare Wonder Woman's strength, along with other gods and goddesses from Greek Mythology: "As lovely as Aphrodite -- as wise as Athena -- with the speed of Mercury and the strength of Hercules, WONDER WOMAN brings to America a new hope and salvation from Old World evils, conquest, and aggression!"

In other comics, Hercules is used as a foil to Superman. In these Silver Age books, Hercules usually appears as a giant, and frequently tests his strength with the Bible character Samson and Zha-Vam, another giant to whom he granted strength, as well as with Superman. In one story, he is transported to the 20th century by Lex Luthor, and, in the guise of reporter Roger Tate, falls in love with Lois Lane. He gains power from other gods and puts Superman into a 100-year sleep with the pipe of Apollo, saying that he will only revive Superman if Lois marries him. However, Venus realizes what has happened and wakes Superman up. After this, Hercules is tricked into flying back in time with the sandals of Mercury, and loses his memory of the events.

==== Hercules Unbound ====
In 1975, DC produced a comic book series titled Hercules Unbound, featuring the adventures of Hercules in a post-apocalyptic future. This Hercules looks different from the other DC interpretations - he has long black hair and no beard. The series lasted 12 issues.

It made use of characters and concepts, such as The Atomic Knights and the intelligent animals from Jack Kirby's Kamandi, the Last Boy on Earth series as an attempt to tie in some of the future series. This version of Hercules is chained to a rock outcropping in the Mediterranean. He escapes and learns that in the centuries he had been chained by Ares, humans had not only made great scientific progress but also used that same science to destroy the human world by means of nuclear weapons. He wanders the world making friends along the way and battling monsters, mad gods, and warlords that threatened the remaining humans. It climaxed with him saving Olympus from the gods' evil duplicates and, having been deceived by Zeus, deciding to stay in the human world. It closed with him walking away into the night with his girlfriend Jenny.

It is later hinted that this version of Hercules was actually part of a dream suffered by Gardner Grayle, but was later shown to have existed somewhere in the Multiverse and was eliminated during the Crisis on Infinite Earths. José Luis García-López drew the first six issues and Walt Simonson drew the remainder of the series. Wally Wood inked several issues.

=== Post-Crisis on Infinite Earths ===
==== Wonder Woman ====
After the reboot of the DC universe in Crisis, Heracles— the Greek spelling—appeared in the pages of Wonder Woman. George Pérez, putting Greek mythology at the center of Wonder Woman's world, relates the tale of Heracles' and his men's conquest of the Amazons and his rape of Queen Hippolyta, and their revenge upon him.

Heracles subduing Hippolyta, art by George Pérez.

During Diana's Challenge of the Gods storyline, she discovers that Heracles was transformed into a colossal stone pillar within Doom's Doorway, and was supporting Themyscira's weight for several millennia. In this stone state, he was tormented and scarred by various mythological creatures, feeling the pain inflicted by them but not being able to do anything about it. This was the punishment given to him by his Olympian family for his past transgressions. Gaining his original form back, he begs the Amazons for forgiveness. Though some of the Amazons still harbor hatred for their past rapes and humiliation, most of them are moved by Heracles' newfound humility, and Queen Hippolyta asks her people to search their hearts for the strength to forgive, which they eventually do. Doing so herself, Hippolyta not only forgives Heracles, but shares a brief romance with him before he leaves the mortal realm to return to his father Zeus in Olympus.

Later, John Byrne did an inconclusive storyline in which Heracles appears in the contemporary world and schemes to take revenge on the Amazons by seducing Wonder Woman. He does this by making an agreement with Harold Champion, a mortal Golden Age superhero. In exchange for his identity, Heracles gives Champion admission into Olympus. Once this is agreed upon, Heracles uses the Mirror of Circe to alter his appearance into that of Champion. He proceeds to befriend Wonder Woman as a "new" friend, helping her deal with such problems as a confrontation with a duplicate of the villain Doomsday. Heracles' identity is eventually revealed and he resumes his life on Olympus.

==== War of the Gods ====
In the post-Crisis DC Universe, the Roman Gods exist separately from the Greek ones after Darkseid tricked them into splitting up so they could be worshipped by two different cultures at the same time; only after the "War of the Gods" the two versions merge again.

==== One Year Later ====
A revamped Hercules reappears during the events of One Year Later. Now shaven and bearing an updated version of the armor worn in the Hercules Unbound series, his place in the Wonder Woman comic is renewed as a fellow agent of Olympus, who occasionally aids Diana and even replaces her in battle. He is referred to as "Wonder Man" by Cheetah and Nemesis. He temporarily sets up base in the Greek Embassy.

Wonder Woman (vol. 3) #4 reveals that Hercules lied about his reasons for returning to Earth. As one of the inhabitants of Olympus who rejected Athena's decision to remove themselves from the mortal realm, Hercules journeyed to Tartarus in hopes of recruiting Ares to aid him in returning to Earth. Instead, he found Circe who, upon hearing Hercules' story and not wanting to spend eternity in limbo with Athena, decided to partner with Hercules instead. This did not last long, as Circe betrayed him. The two part as enemies once Circe magically binds him to a rock.

Some time before the events of Wonder Girl, but after the events of "Who Is Wonder Woman?", Hercules encounters and battles Gog, who is killing gods. After suffering a blast from Gog's staff, Hercules is incapacitated and encounters Superman and his Earth-22 counterpart. He enters into combat with the two of them, but is ultimately defeated. Hercules' physical appearance here is closer to the one seen in "Who Is Wonder Woman?". In addition, he is described as a "god" (and not a demigod, as in Wonder Girl) and wears gold bracelets instead of the gray shackles Zeus will place on him as punishment.

==== Wonder Girl ====
A being claiming to be Zeus eventually frees Hercules from his prison and says that he must partner with his half-sister Cassie Sandsmark. Together, Hercules and Cassie try to discover who is attacking the remaining Olympian gods. Soon into their search they are attacked by the Female Furies. Hercules stops the fight by explaining that he is allied with the Furies in hopes of rescuing the gods, or, failing that, starting a new pantheon with them. The Furies have their own plans, though, and are only using Hercules to get to Cassandra. The Furies soon betray Hercules, with Bloody Mary using her bite to gain power over Hercules, forcing him to do what the Furies want. The Furies then kidnap Cassandra's mother to lure her into a trap. Aided by the Olympian, Cassandra goes into battle, being forced to fight her own brother. The Teen Titans and Wonder Woman herself show up to help out, which evens the odds. After Bloody Mary is murdered by Infinity-Man, Hercules is freed from her spell and saves Cassie from being kidnapped by the fleeing Furies.

While being questioned by Wonder Woman, Hercules says that he was freed by Zeus and sought his closest relative—Cassandra—for help. He explains that Zeus freed him to help stop "the Great Disaster", which Hercules does not know much about. There were two conditions for his release: he must always wear his gauntlets to remind him of his punishment (similar to the punishment that the gods placed on the Amazons) and he must give up his godhood, becoming a demigod again. Rather than being upset, Hercules is happy to be human again and having his mother's blood flowing through his veins. Although Wonder Woman is initially skeptical, Cassandra vouches for Hercules, telling Diana that he has saved her life twice. Hercules is allowed to remain free, to complete his "labors" and make up for the things that he has done.

The series mentions several facts about Hercules, including his cycle of crime, punishment, and redemption; gods and other beings (Hera and Circe being mentioned by name) using him to commit great evil (such as the death of his family); and his uneasy relationship with the Amazons and Wonder Woman in particular.

The Hercules that empowers the Marvels is apparently different from this Hercules, sharing only his name. He is one of the Lords of Magic and possesses superhuman strength.

=== Post-Flashpoint ===
In post-Flashpoint continuity, Hercules is reintroduced in the pages of Aquaman as a maddened prisoner alongside the monstrous children descended from the Titans called the Giant Born. Thousands of years before, Hercules sacrificed himself so that Atlan, King of Atlantis of the bygone era, could trap them within a hellish penal dimension opened using the Maelstrom, an extra-dimensional translocation gateway which enabled the Atlanteans of old to traverse between worlds. When accidentally released from their Tartaran prison by a misguided archaeologist, these fiends of old are intercepted by Aquaman and sent in their former jailer, whose mind had been corrupted by their torment and dark magics over the years to do battle with him while they made their escape. After a lengthy battle between him and the Sea King, Hercules was bested when he tried to drown Arthur, who dragged him into the sea, beating him into unconsciousness, before sending him back through the Maelstrom into a maze of the Minotaur-like dimension.

Hercules is later seen living a quiet, peaceful life as a human in the mountains outside Oregon. He is confronted by Darkseid's daughter Grail, who kills him and steals his life force to feed it to an adolescent Darkseid.

== Powers and abilities ==
As the son of Zeus and Wonder Woman's half-brother, Hercules is the one who provides Shazam's superhuman strength and is therefore, one of DC's most physically powerful characters. As an Olympian demigod, he has other standard characteristics for all members of the race; superhuman speed, agility, reflexes, senses, endurance, durability, healing factor and immortality.

Hercules is also an advanced level martial fighter. Though easily dominated by Hippolyta, the Queen noted and congratulated him on his excellent combat skills (though below the standard Amazon level). He is able to combine his martial techniques and tactics with his strength, revealing himself as a complicated and dangerous opponent to anyone facing him.

== Other versions ==
Quality Comics' Joe Hercules

A separate character, Joe Hercules, appeared in the Quality Comics series Hit Comics from issue #1 (July 1940) through #21 (April 1942). Joe Hercules was an ordinary man from the "North Woods" imbued with superhuman strength who became a circus strongman and crimefighter. Hercules was later acquired by DC Comics along with several other Quality Comics characters.

== In other media ==
- Hercules appears in The Freedom Force.
- Hercules appears in the Superboy episode "Little Hercules", portrayed by Joaquin Phoenix.
- Hercules appears in the Injustice: Gods Among Us prequel comic, where he is killed by Superman.
- In 1982, Hercules received an action figure in the Remco line "Lost World of the Warlord".

== Collected editions ==
- Showcase Presents: The Great Disaster featuring the Atomic Knights (includes Hercules Unbound #1-12 and DC Comics Presents #57, 576 pages, June 2014, ISBN 978-1401242909)

== Sources ==
- Beatty, Scott (2009). Wonder Woman: The Ultimate Guide To The Amazon Princess. Dorling Kindersley Publishing. pp. 72–73. ISBN 978-0-7894-9616-4.
