= Thrax (mythology) =

Son of Ares in Greek mythology

In Greek mythology, Thrax (Ancient Greek: Θρᾷξ, romanized: Thrāix; by his name simply the quintessential Thracian) was regarded as one of the reputed sons of Ares. In the Alcestis, Euripides mentions that one of the names of Ares himself was Thrax since he was regarded as the patron of Thrace (his golden or gilded shield was kept in his temple at Bistonia in Thrace).

== See also ==
- Tiras – eponymous ancestor of Thracians according to Flavius Josephus
