= First Born (comics) =

DC Comics supervillain

Publication information
- Publisher: DC Comics
- First appearance: Wonder Woman (vol. 4) #13 (December 2012)
- Created by: Brian Azzarello; Cliff Chiang

In-story information
- Abilities: Immortality; Superhuman strength and durability; Linguistic absorption

The First Born is a supervillain appearing in American comic books published by DC Comics, the firstborn son of Zeus and Hera, and the half-brother of the superhero Wonder Woman. He is commonly depicted as an adversary of Wonder Woman. Created by Brian Azzarello and Cliff Chiang, the character first appeared in Wonder Woman (vol. 4) #13 (December 2012).

== Fictional character biography ==
The First Born is the son of Zeus and Hera. On the day of his birth, Zeus had a witch foretell his future. She predicted that Mount Olympus would have been under his sole absolute control, with death and destruction in his wake. The witch was told to kill the baby to prevent this future, but decided to spare his life and abandoned him in Africa with a slim chance to survive. However, the First Born was taken in and raised by a pack of hyenas. Despite never meeting any humans before he reached manhood, the First Born knew he was the son of Zeus and tried to gain his attention without success by performing feats of strength and savagery. The First Born attacked Mount Olympus, but was subdued by Zeus and buried in Earth's core.

Ever since then, the First Born has been clawing his way out of the Earth, which took over seven thousand years. All knowledge of his existence was erased from history by Zeus, the only account of his story being tattooed across the mummified body of the witch who spared him. The First Born emerges from ice in Antarctica soon after Apollo takes over the throne of Olympus.

== Powers and abilities ==
As an Olympian god, the First Born possesses sufficient superhuman strength, speed and invulnerability to challenge the likes of Wonder Woman and Orion. After surviving blows from Orion and Wonder Woman, he was able to pry open a Boom Tube and hold it open for an extended period of time. Despite his extraordinary physical power, First Born uses his divine genius to manipulate or control lesser beings, like his hyena-men, preferring only to engage in direct confrontations with equals or other gods.

Among the First Born's array of godly powers is his telepathic ability to communicate with wildlife, particularly his hyena companions. He has also displayed his telepathic abilities by sensing the berserker rage in Wonder Woman and goading her into a fight with him.
