= Zeus (DC Comics) =

DC Comics character

- Zeus as he appeared in The New 52 continuity. Art by Cliff Chiang

Publication information
- Publisher: DC Comics
- First appearance: Superman #28 (May 1944)
- Created by: Jerry Siegel; Ira Yarbrough

In-story information
- Alter ego: Zeus
- Species: Olympian God
- Place of origin: Mount Olympus
- Team affiliations: Olympian Gods
- Notable aliases: Jupiter, Jove
- Abilities: Superhuman strength, speed, stamina, intelligence, and durability; Magic; Size alteration; Shapeshifting; Cloning; Energy manipulation; Flight; Lightning manipulation; Storm manipulation

Zeus is a fictional deity in the DC Comics universe, an interpretation of Zeus from Greek mythology. His appearances are most significant in the stories of his daughter, Wonder Woman (Princess Diana). With the 2011 relaunch of DC Comics dubbed The New 52, Zeus has received a prominent role in the Wonder Woman mythos, as he is now the biological father of Wonder Woman through Hippolyta.

== Fictional character biography ==
Zeus' origins and early history mostly conform to the way they are presented in classical mythology. He is a child of the Titans Cronus and Rhea and leader of the twelve Olympian Gods. During a war between the Titans and Olympians, Zeus kills his father and assumes his place as King of the Gods, ruling from Mount Olympus with his wife Hera. He is the father of numerous gods and heroes, the most famous being Hercules.

In the DC Universe, the machinations of the alien god Darkseid when he spreads tales of the Roman Gods cause the Olympians to split into multiple aspects, with the Roman gods existing for a time as separate entities. Zeus' counterpart Jupiter rules his own Olympus in a separate dimension following this. The two pantheons are merged into single entities again centuries later.

In present day, Zeus is a benefactor of the Amazons, the last remaining people who still worship the Olympians. However, his patriarchal attitudes, disregard for mortals, and unreasonable demands have sometimes led to conflict with his followers, particularly their champion Wonder Woman. Additionally, he is one of the seven deities who empower Captain Marvel / Shazam.

After Wonder Woman's defeat of Ares, which caused the latter to go into self-exile, Zeus becomes interested in Diana and wants her virginity, offering to make her a goddess. Diana becomes the first woman ever to refuse his advances while professing love for him as god and father. Enraged at being rejected, Zeus threatens her, but is summoned back to Olympus by Hera at the urging at the Goddesses who created the Amazons and are incensed themselves at Zeus for trying to make Themyscira his personal brothel. As punishment, Zeus demands that Diana undertake the Challenge of the Gods, on which she defeats the evils that have been trapped under Paradise Island, including a Hecatonshire and the Lernaean Hydra. She frees Heracles, who had been turned to stone and was supporting the Island.

During a War of the Gods, Zeus leads the Olympians in a conflict with their Roman counterparts and other deities, until mortal heroes intervene to end the war. After Darkseid destroys the glory of Olympus, Zeus convinces the other gods to abandon both it and Earth, and only Hermes refuses. The gods later return to Olympus but have occasionally been forced to defend or relocate it.

As in classical myth, Zeus frequently cheats on his wife Hera and couples with mortals to produce demi-god offspring. Zeus has been revealed as the father of Wonder Girl (Cassie Sandsmark) and shares a complicated relationship with his daughter, who resents his absence from most of her life.

Zeus is briefly deposed as ruler of Olympus during a coup staged by his daughter Athena with help from Ares. In the wake of this conflict, Athena becomes Queen of the Gods and Ares is appointed Lord of the Underworld. Shortly after this, the gods enter their second exile, following the Amazons into another dimension after the events of the Infinite Crisis. Their return to the Earth-realm is brought about by Darkseid, who captures the Olympians and tampers with their memories, seeking the secrets of their power. In Countdown to Final Crisis, Darkseid's New Gods pose as Olympians and manipulate their followers. Once freed from Darkseid, the old Olympian order is restored. Athena seemingly dies from her sustained injuries and Zeus once again becomes King of the Gods, giving Mary Marvel her powers back after she frees the Gods from a chamber on Apokolips.

Zeus' manipulations of his followers finally come to a head with the creation of the Gargareans, a race of warriors intended as male counterparts of the Amazons. Zeus murders the Hawaiian god Kāne Milohaʻi, a patron of Wonder Woman, and uses his heart to resurrect Achilles Warkiller, whom he appoints as leader of the Gargareans. Zeus also instates Achilles as the new ruler of Themyscira. When Wonder Woman learns of this and of the murder of Kāne, she becomes enraged and physically assaults Zeus. This blasphemy shocks her mother Hippolyta and leads Diana to enter self-exile.

In The New 52 reboot, Wonder Woman's origin is revised, with her now being the biological daughter of Zeus and Hippolyta. This encounter was hidden from Diana, who was raised to believe that she was born out of clay, in order to protect Diana from Hera.

== Powers and abilities ==
Depending on the writer, Zeus' powers require either direct or indirect worship to sustain them. Without this worship his powers may fade over time allowing other gods to equal or surpass him.

In most stories, Zeus is one of or the most powerful Olympian god. He has vast supernatural powers with a focus on weather control, but can accomplish nearly anything including shapeshifting, resurrecting the dead, and creating new life.

== In other media ==
=== Television ===
- Zeus appears in the Challenge of the Superfriends episode "Battle of the Gods", voiced by Bob Holt.
- Zeus appears in the DC Nation Shorts "Shazam" short "Wisdom", voiced by Kevin Conroy.

=== Film ===
- Zeus appears in Wonder Woman (2009), voiced by David McCallum.
- Zeus appears in films set in the DC Extended Universe (DCEU).
  - First appearing in flashbacks depicted in Wonder Woman (2017) via CGI, this version created the Amazons to protect and help mankind. However, his son Ares revolted to corrupt mankind, killing his fellow Olympians in the process. Zeus defeated Ares and cast him from Mount Olympus, but suffered fatal wounds. Nevertheless, he created Themyscira to protect the Amazons, cloaked it from the world gave them the "god-killer" sword, and conceived Diana with Hippolyta to help them slay Ares should he return.
  - Zeus appears in flashbacks depicted in Justice League, portrayed by Sergi Constance.

=== Video games ===
Zeus appears in DC Universe Online.
