= Countdown to Final Crisis =

Comic book limited series published by DC Comics

- Cover of Countdown #51 (May 2007). Art by Andy Kubert.

Publication information
- Publisher: DC Comics
- Schedule: Weekly
- Format: Limited series
- Genre: Superhero
- Publication date: May 2007 - April 2008
- No. of issues: 51 + DC Universe #0
- Main character(s): Darkseid; Donna Troy; Jimmy Olsen; Mary Marvel; Jason Todd; Harley Quinn; Holly Robinson; Karate Kid; Kyle Rayner; Superboy-Prime; Monarch; Ray Palmer; Pied Piper; Una; Forager; Trickster; Duela Dent

Creative team
- Written by: Paul Dini; Jimmy Palmiotti; Sean McKeever; Tony Bedard; Adam Beechen; Justin Gray
- Artist(s): Keith Giffen; Jesus Saiz; Jim Calafiore; Carlos Magno; David Lopez; Tom Derenick; Jamal Igle; Manuel Garcia

Collected editions
- Volume 1: ISBN 1-4012-1789-3
- Volume 2: ISBN 1-4012-1824-5
- Volume 3: ISBN 1-4012-1911-X
- Volume 4: ISBN 1-4012-1912-8

Countdown, also known as Countdown to Final Crisis for its last 24 issues based on the cover, was a comic book limited series published by DC Comics. It debuted on May 9, 2007, directly following the conclusion of the last issue of 52. The series is written primarily by Paul Dini, along with a rotating team of writers and artists.

Countdown consists of 51 issues, numbered in reverse and published weekly for one year. The series covers much of the fictional DC Universe, told in parallel narratives through the interconnecting stories of a cast of characters. It frequently crosses over with other DC titles. Unlike the 52 limited series of the previous year, Countdown is not depicted as taking place in "real time", but presumably operates on the same floating timeline as DC Comics stories in general.

== Production history ==
The series follows the success of 52, which, in contrast, did not cross over with DC's other regular titles. 52 concluded with the revelation that the multiverse (a storytelling device which posits the existence of alternative realities) exists, and which now serves as a backdrop to several stories in Countdown. Beginning with issue #26, the series trade dress was reworked to identify the series as Countdown to Final Crisis. The stories taking place in Countdown set the stage for the approaching Final Crisis limited series.

Countdown to Final Crisis was originally intended to run from issues #51-0, with issue #0 serving as the prologue to the Final Crisis limited series. Instead, it was decided that Countdown would conclude with issue #1 and the #0 issue was retitled to DC Universe #0. DC Universe #0 was co-written by Grant Morrison and Geoff Johns and served as a summary of recent events within the DC Universe in order to attract new readers before the company launched the Final Crisis limited series.

While the book was billed as leading up to the beginning of DC's Final Crisis limited series, it later emerged that the plotlines in Countdown had diverged from what was written for Final Crisis, leading to continuity problems between the two books, as noted by Final Crisis author Grant Morrison. Much of the comic has subsequently been retconned out of continuity, along with Death of the New Gods. Jimmy Olsen learning Superman's secret identity, the battle between him and Darkseid, and other such events have been ignored following the conclusion of the series. During a DC Nation panel at the 2008 San Diego Comic-Con, DC editor-in-chief Dan DiDio invited fans to give their own opinions on "what went wrong" with Countdown. Prior to its release, DiDio reportedly described the series as "52 done right."

== Story ==
=== Darkseid ===
On Apokolips, Darkseid and DeSaad discuss the coming of a time with existence being recreated with Darkseid as the architect. Darkseid has what appears to be a chess-board with pieces representing Joker, Donna Troy, Green Arrow, Flash, Holly Robinson, Batman, Jason Todd, Hawkman, Killer Croc, Martian Manhunter, Superman, Wonder Woman, OMAC, Jimmy Olsen, Nightwing, Duela Dent, and Black Adam.

Later, as the New Gods Lightray and Sleez are killed by an unknown, mysterious figure, Darkseid converses with a concubine and DeSaad. When the concubine comments on Darkseid showing a moment of weakness, Darkseid kills her and tells DeSaad to remove the vocal cords from the next concubine. The conversation is witnessed by Forager, who is spying on them to see if Darkseid is responsible for the recent murders of the New Gods. Forager is attacked by a guard and escapes. The Deep Six are killed soon afterwards by the same mysterious figure. Darkseid shows knowledge of the New Gods dying across the galaxy and the mystery figure killing them, and decides to use the New Gods as pawns in a scheme to rule the multiverse.

Mary Marvel is brought before Darkseid, who tells her that he wants a sorcerer and that she is it. Mary narrowly escapes Darkseid's clutches with the help of DeSaad, who intervenes in time to distract the villain after she turns down his offer, causing a brief scuffle between them. Eclipso assures Darkseid that she will bring Mary back. Darkseid later restores Mary's powers and orders her to capture Jimmy Olsen. Later, Darkseid is about to siphon Jimmy's superpowers from him before his son Orion emerges from a boom tube and kills him. The Monitor Solomon places a chess piece of Darkseid onto the Source Wall as a memento of his victory.

=== Donna Troy, Jason Todd, Kyle Rayner, and Ray Palmer ===
In New York City, former Robin Jason Todd (now calling himself Red Hood) witnesses the murder of Duela Dent at the hands of a rogue Monitor, who claims her presence in this world is not tolerated as she is from an alternate Earth. Jason later meets former Wonder Girl Donna Troy after the other Teen Titans pay their respects at Duela's grave and speculates that the two of them, like Duela, may not belong in this reality either. During the Amazons' attack on Washington, D.C., Jason and Donna discuss the Monitors and the original Monitor and Anti-Monitor when they are attacked by the Forerunner, who had been sent by the Monitors. Another Monitor arrives to save Jason and Donna from the Forerunners and takes them to safety.

At the funeral of the Flash, Bart Allen, the Monitor tells Jason and Donna that the former Atom, Ray Palmer, is alive and lost somewhere in the Nanoverse, and that locating him is key to surviving the coming crisis. Donna, Jason and the Monitor (nicknamed "Bob" by Jason), meet with current Atom Ryan Choi to recruit him in the search for Ray Palmer. Kyle Rayner informs the group that they will have to search the multiverse to find Ray.

Nix Uotan informs Bob that all the Monitors have taken on names for themselves, such as the Monitor of Earth-8, who now calls himself Solomon. Meanwhile, Ray is found on Earth-51, a near-perfect world where crime has long been eradicated, having replaced his deceased Earth-51 counterpart. Bob is revealed to have been working for Solomon's cause and tells Ray that he must be exterminated.

It is revealed that Earth-51's Ray discovered a sentient virus called Morticoccus and had it quarantined. However, when the multiverse was discovered, Ray theorized that Morticoccus could exist on other Earths and set about using his own superhuman immune system to immunize their populations. After the death of Earth-51's Ray, the New Earth Ray found his research and continued his work.

Kyle, Jason, Donna, Ray and the Batman of Earth-51 are reunited as they approach their confrontation with Monarch, but encounter a message written in large flaming letters: "To Apokolips". Before they decide their next move, the Earth-51 Batman confronts a group of Monarch's soldiers, but is killed by Ultraman. The Challengers are met by Nix Uotan, who explains that the message came from the Source and sends them to Apokolips.

On Apokolips, the Challengers are confused as to why they are there as Palmer says it is not connected to the Great Disaster. Jason tires of their bickering and leaves. Upon seeing Brother Eye, Jason contemplates using it to get back home. While searching for Jason, the Challengers find Mary, Harley, Holly and then Karate Kid, just after Brother Eye removes the Morticoccus virus from him. The group, along with Jason, prepares to confront Brother Eye, who uses a Boom Tube to send them to Apokolips.

The group goes to see Dubbilex for help with Karate Kid, only to learn that he has already died from Morticoccus. During Karate Kid's autopsy, Morticoccus is accidentally released and spreads across Earth, causing infected humans to devolve into animalistic savages and infected animals to gain human-like traits. Una helps Buddy Blank reach his daughter's apartment and the two locate Blank's daughter, who has been infected by the virus, and his grandson, who is immune. Una is mortally wounded while protecting Blank and his grandson from rats and gives Blank her Legion Flight Ring, which he uses to take him and his grandson to Cadmus's Command D facility. The Challengers leave the reconstituted Earth-51 and return home.

=== Mary Marvel, Holly Robinson, and Harley Quinn ===
Mary Batson awakens from a coma after the events of The Trials of Shazam!, in which she lost her abilities mid-flight due to the death of Shazam and fell three miles. She seeks Freddy Freeman, who paid her hospital bills, and consults Madame Xanadu, who fails to locate Freddy and warns Mary not to go to Gotham City. Ignoring her, Mary is chased by thugs through the Gotham subway, and finds the former Kahndaqi embassy, where Black Adam has been hiding. Adam appears, saves Mary, and, following a discussion, transfers his powers to Mary.

Mary eventually locates Billy, who explains that he has replaced the wizard Shazam and that Freddy will replace him. Billy scolds Mary for taking Black Adam's powers and Mary protests that she will use them for good. In Gotham, Mary encounters former super-villain Riddler at a crime scene. Riddler suggests she seek a mentor while Eclipso watches with interest.

In the Chinese Market, Mary meets Klarion the Witch Boy, who tries to get some of her power. After Eclipso attempts to corrupt Mary, the Shadowpact take notice of Mary's activities, and attack Mary and Eclipso, who are overwhelmed and escape. Eclipso takes Mary to meet Darkseid, who offers to show her true darkness. Upon observing his treatment of people as mere puppets, Mary attacks him. An interruption by DeSaad allows Mary to escape. Eclipso talks Mary into returning to Darkseid and submitting to his authority, suggesting that she can usurp his powers if she grows strong enough. The asteroid on which Mary and Eclipso are standing is destroyed by a stray shot from the Dominators and Monarch's armies. After Eclipso teleports her to safety, Mary blasts Eclipso with her own black diamond after realizing that Eclipso was only interested in selling her to Darkseid as a concubine in exchange for power. Eclipso manages to wrest the diamond from Mary's grasp, and leaves, telling her that she is once again alone. Eclipso then attempts to kill Mary, but finds that she is too strong. During their battle, Mary calls down the lightning, which strikes the two of them, causing Mary to fall into the ocean and wash up on the shores of Themiscyra.

Holly Robinson arrives in Metropolis, hoping to embark on a fresh start. Holly is offered a place to live at a women's shelter, where she meets the reformed Harleen Quinzel. She is outraged to find that the refuge refuses shelter to a single mother and speaks to their leader, Athena, who convinces Holly to go on a quest.

Holly reveals to Harleen that she has been asked to take part in Athena's self-esteem workshop; Harleen is overjoyed at the news. Holly is subjected to a purification ritual in which the women are made to fight one another. Holly and Harley are the only warriors left standing. The two are taken to Themiscyra and told by Athena that their first test is to out-swim the island's water guardians. The recruits are led through a series of increasingly dangerous obstacles.

Athena is revealed to be a disguised Granny Goodness and flees to Apokolips, with Mary, Holly, and Harley in pursuit. On Apokolips, Mary, Holly and Harley fight Lashina, Stompa, and Mad Harriet of the Female Furies. Lashina and Stompa are defeated while Mad Harriet is accidentally killed by Apokoliptian soldiers. The group manage to free the Greek gods from an Apokoliptian chamber, and Mary regains her powers. The group pursues Granny Goodness, who is killed by the God-Killer. After returning to their own Earth, Holly and Harley return to Gotham, while Mary returns to her apartment and finds Darkseid waiting for her. Darkseid offers to return Black Adam's powers to her in exchange for bringing him Jimmy Olsen. Mary agrees, and with her restored powers she quickly overcomes the Challengers and captures Jimmy.

=== Jimmy Olsen ===
Jimmy Olsen locates the Red Hood, Jason Todd, and interviews him about the death of Duela Dent. Jason suggests that he interviews the Joker in Arkham Asylum. The Joker states that he never had a daughter, and alludes to a larger conspiracy. While calling Lois to inform her of his dead end, Jimmy is attacked by Killer Croc. To Jimmy's surprise, he begins manifesting superpowers at random. Jimmy resolves to use his new powers to become a superhero, designs a costume, and calls himself Mr. Action. He revels in his new popularity, and decides to join the Teen Titans. Robin begs him to reconsider, as his powers only manifest when he is in danger. Jimmy tries out for membership in the Justice League, but is deflated when his powers do not manifest.

John Henry Irons tests Jimmy's powers using metahuman biofeedback, but the display generates complicated images of the Source Wall and alternate Earths. On his way home, Jimmy meets two members of Cadmus, who offer their assistance, take him back to their HQ, and run tests on him. Jimmy's powers go haywire, and he runs off to keep himself from hurting anyone. Jimmy encounters Forager, who asks for help in stopping the killing of the New Gods. On Apokolips, Jimmy and Forager are overpowered and taken prisoner. The Monitors decide that Jimmy is not meant to control his powers and that he is being manipulated. Jimmy is sent to the slave pits, where his overseers are ordered to torture him; Mister Miracle comes to his aid. Unable to discern the nature of Jimmy's powers with his Mother Box, Mister Miracle gambles by dropping Jimmy into a fire pit. Jimmy survives by assuming a turtle-like form. Jimmy locates Forager, who then attacks him. Jimmy duplicates the powers of a Mother Box to restore Forager's sanity. When Bernadeth confronts the two, Jimmy opens a Boom Tube and returns to Earth with Forager, whereupon he kisses her.

Back at Jimmy's apartment, Forager reveals to Jimmy that he is a soul catcher who is collecting the spirits of the deceased New Gods. Solomon later tells Jimmy that he was converted into a spirit collector by Darkseid, who plans to eventually drain his powers. Darkseid reactivates Jimmy's powers to cause him to emit kryptonite radiation to kill Superman. However, Ray Palmer sneaks inside Jimmy and destroys the circuitry that controls his powers before being overcome by its defenses. Jimmy transforms into a scaled giant and prepares to fight Darkseid. Darkseid fights Jimmy across Metropolis and is about to kill him when Ray Palmer emerges from Jimmy's head, having shut down the device inside Jimmy that was storing the essences of the New Gods. A Boom Tube then opens up and Orion, Darkseid's son, emerges. Orion clashes with Darkseid and kills him after ripping Darkseid's heart from his chest. Soon afterwards, Jimmy returns home, where his relationship with Forager deteriorates.

=== Karate Kid and Triplicate Girl ===
Karate Kid and Una travel to Oracle's home, where they discover that someone is trying to steal the secret identities of all of the world's superheroes, which Oracle manages to prevent. Oracle learns that Calculator is behind the plot and defeats him. Karate Kid reveals that he is dying from a virus and only Oracle can help him. After examining Karate Kid, Oracle determines that the virus is either of alien origin, or too advanced to detect. She directs the two to see Elias Orr for more answers. They defeat Orr's bodyguard, Equus, who directs them to another researcher and deduces that the virus may be related to OMAC. After the two leave, Orr reports to DeSaad.

Karate Kid and Una meet Professor Buddy Blank, who takes them to see Brother Eye. Brother Eye confirms that Karate Kid is infected with the OMAC virus and refers to the "Great Disaster". He informs Karate Kid that there is a similar strain hidden in a bunker beneath Blüdhaven. Traveling through the ruins of Blüdhaven, the group meet Firestorm as Karate Kid begins to cough up blood. Karate Kid and Firestorm break into a vault under Blüdhaven to find DeSaad torturing Martin Stein.

Buddy Blank leads Karate Kid, Una, and his grandson deeper underground. Coming upon a sealed door, Karate Kid attempts to open it, which enables Brother Eye to escape the hangar. Converting the people in the hangar into OMACs, Brother Eye assimilates the entire base and breaks free. Upon detecting that the Morticoccus host is in its final gestation, and that the virus' release is imminent, it sets course for Blüdhaven.

Upon discovering Apokoliptian technology in the bunker, Brother Eye opens a Boom Tube and takes its captives to Apokolips, leaving Blank and his grandson behind. Karate Kid and Una wander around Apokolips seeking a means to escape as Karate Kid fears Brother Eye desires the virus he carries. However, before they can formulate a plan, Una becomes an OMAC. After failing to assimilate Karate Kid, Brother Eye decides to perform an autopsy on him instead. Brother Eye then removes the Morticoccus virus from Karate Kid, who is saved by Ray Palmer. Apokolips' destruction and Brother Eye's escape free Una from her transformation into an OMAC. Karate Kid dies and releases the Morticoccus virus, which infects the entire world. The Brother Eye of Earth-51 transforms Blank into a modified OMAC, which allows him and his grandson Tommy to escape the ruins of Command-D.

=== Trickster and Pied Piper ===
The Rogues manage to kill the Flash, Bart Allen. Piper and Trickster then go on the run following Bart's murder, but attend his funeral, where they are captured by Multiplex and Deadshot. Piper and Trickster escape, but are pursued by the Suicide Squad, Batman, and Wally West. Piper and Trickster attempt to tell Wally that they overheard Deathstroke's plans to murder the attendees at Black Canary and Green Arrow's wedding, but are internally attacked by Deathstroke's tracking device. Flash manages to remove the explosive implants and brings the two of them to Zatanna's home. Trickster and Piper use Zatanna's mummy bodyguard Hassan to create a distraction and escape Black Canary's bachelorette party. As they escape in a stolen car, they are suddenly accosted by Double Down, who had hidden in the back seat. Double Down wants to join the two in their run from the law, mentioning the disappearances of several villains. The group is then attacked by the Suicide Squad. Double Down is defeated and captured, but Piper and Trickster escape. Piper and Trickster continue to flee, escaping capture by Deadshot. They are able to defeat Deadshot, but not before he manages to shoot Trickster dead. The cord binding Piper and Trickster together detects that Trickster is dead and begins a fail-safe procedure, counting down from twenty-four hours until it detonates. Piper, delirious from the heat, begins to imagine Trickster's corpse is talking to him and removes Trickster's hand from his body to avoid triggering the bomb.

Piper is transported to Apokolips via a Boom Tube. Once on Apokolips, Piper begins to despair, thinking he is in Hell, and contemplates pulling Trickster's hand out of its cuff and killing himself. Piper is stopped by an unknown person before he sets off the bomb. The person reveals himself to be DeSaad, who frees Piper from the cord, which is revealed to be based on his technology. DeSaad claims Piper is able to channel the Anti-Life Equation in a manner beyond that of a New God. However, before Piper can play the equation on his pipe, Brother Eye finishes assimilating Apokolips. After recovering, DeSaad confesses to masterminding Trickster and Piper's ordeal. However, they are attacked by an OMAC, and Piper is captured. DeSaad continues to pursue Piper and convinces him to finally play. Piper uses his pipe to kill DeSaad and destroy Apokolips while Brother Eye escapes. Piper reawakens in Gotham City and decides to become a hero after seeing the Bat-Signal.

=== Monarch, the Monitors, and Superman-Prime ===
After Duela Dent's murder, one of the Monitors consults the Source Wall to learn the cause of the rising tension in the multiverse. The Wall reveals that the "Great Disaster" is the cause of the rising tension and that Ray Palmer is the solution to stopping it. At their headquarters, the Monitors discuss their goal of protecting the multiverse from individuals who cross between worlds. They vote to decide the fates of Donna Troy, Jason Todd, and Kyle Rayner, and the decision is made to purge them as anomalies.

Monarch and Forerunner approach the Justice League Axis of Earth-10, the Crime Society of Earth-3, and the Extremists of Earth-8 and offers them membership in his army. The Extremists refuse and attack him, but he easily overwhelms them, and captures the "Challengers from Beyond". The Monitors believe Monarch's goal is to cause a war across the multiverse, resulting in another Crisis that would make him the absolute Monarch of a singular reality. Monarch places Lord Havok in charge of his starfleet; Havok deals a crippling blows to the Dominators of New Earth.

The Monitors agree to eliminate "Bob," the Monitor of New Earth who befriended Jason and Donna. Earth-15's Monitor watches as Donna and Jason leave his Earth, and predicts that when they arrive on the Earth of his overzealous brother, they will be terminated. The overzealous Monitor, who oversees Earth-8, attacks them when they arrive on Earth-8, but succeeds only in killing the Jokester of Earth-3. The Monitor from Earth-8 convinces the others that they must go to war in order to save billions of lives that would otherwise be lost.

The Monitors arrive on Earth-51, shortly after the Challengers escape. The Monitor of Earth-8, now calling himself "Solomon", attempts to absorb Bob into his being, but inadvertently kills him instead. The other Monitors claim that Solomon engineered all of the events to his own ends. The Monitors are then interrupted by the arrival of Monarch and his army. As the two sides fight, Monarch approaches Solomon and accuses him of desiring sole dominion over the multiverse. Solomon returns to the Multiversal nexus where the remaining Monitors condemn his actions before joining the battle on Earth-51. Floating in space, Nix Uotan, the Monitor of Earth-51, watches the battle raging on his Earth before joining the other Monitors.

Superman-Prime, continues his travels throughout the multiverse to find the perfect universe. Superman-Prime attacks the Lex Luthor of Earth-15, while searching for his perfect universe, which he believes is owed to him. Building a secret lair in the Source Wall itself, Superman-Prime captures Mister Mxyzptlk and Annataz Arataz, an evil analogue of Zatanna, and forces them to give him their magic powers. After her torture at Superman-Prime's hands, Annataz experiences a change of heart and, as a way to atone for her past, taunts Superman-Prime until he lets Mxyzptlk escape, facing his tantrums alone. Superman-Prime destroys his base, burns Annataz alive, and flees. Superman-Prime tears a hole in Monarch's containment suit, causing a chain reaction that destroys Earth-51.

In the Multiversal nexus, Solomon prepares to kill Forerunner, but is interrupted by the arrival of Darkseid, who, wishing to continue their game, offers Solomon the next move. As they witness Brother Eye assimilating Apokolips, Solomon tells Darkseid that his time is coming to an end. Darkseid reveals that Solomon was responsible for Captain Atom irradiating Blüdhaven, causing his transformation into Monarch. Solomon, disturbed by Darkseid's plans to control the "Fifth World", appears to the Challengers, telling them that Darkseid is too dangerous to attack and sends them away. He deposits them on Nix Uotan's newly recreated Earth-51, where the events of the Great Disaster unfold.

== Related events ==
Since Countdown attempts to be the backbone to several DC Comics titles, some events and plots play out in different comic book series.

Meanwhile, the Amazons invade Washington, D.C., led by a recently resurrected Hippolyta and Circe. The mini-series concluded with the revelation that the goddess Athena has in fact been defeated and replaced by the Apokoliptian New God Granny Goodness, suggesting that the shelter that Harley Quinn and Holly Robinson are staying in is actually a Female Furies camp.

Tying into the Karate Kid storyline is the Justice League of America/Justice Society of America crossover "The Lightning Saga". The fight between Batman and Karate Kid is shown in both Countdown and Justice League of America. Dawnstar, Starman, Dream Girl, Timber Wolf, and Wildfire are discovered stranded in the 21st century. Initially, it is believed that they came to the present to save Lightning Lad. It is later revealed that the Legion actually came to retrieve a person, the identity of whom is yet unknown, whose "essence" is now stored in one of the Legion's "lightning rod" devices. The Legion then escaped into the future, leaving behind Starman and Karate Kid. An unforeseen consequence of the Legion's actions was the return of Wally West and his family. Brainiac 5 confirms this by implying West's return was a freak accident, but that they still retrieved the correct person the Legion sought.

The final arc of The Flash: The Fastest Man Alive, "Full Throttle", features the Rogues successfully killing Bart Allen, the fourth Flash. Within Countdown, both the buildup to this as well as its aftermath is felt. Bart's funeral is held, and Piper and Trickster are forced on the run from superheroes and villains alike, which also ties into the upcoming Salvation Run. Connecting this story to "The Lightning Saga" is Wally's return to Earth. Wally's new vendetta against the Rogues is witnessed in Countdown where he finally catches up to Piper and Trickster, the remaining Rogues having already been captured in All Flash #1.

Salvation Run, by Bill Willingham, Lilah Sturges and Sean Chen, is the story of various supervillains who have been captured and deported via Boom Tube technology to another planet. Regarding Countdown, Newsarama asked writer Willingham "Just to try and point out an example of this in action, would it be safe to say that Pied Piper and Trickster would have found themselves on this world had they not escaped capture in Countdown?", to which the response was "That's a fairly safe guess." The Suicide Squad, behind the attempted captures of Piper and Trickster were also shown to have captured other Rogues in All-Flash #1 who are pictured on the cover for issue #1. In Countdown, after escaping Suicide Squad member Deadshot, Piper and Trickster later evade capture from four other members in Gotham City. Among those captured in the limited series include Lex Luthor, Scandal Savage, and the Joker, and the title refers to the planned escape from the planet as led by Luthor.

As well as playing a prominent part in Countdown, the story thread centering on the Death of the New Gods is playing out in other books. Outsiders: Five of a Kind: Week Three: Thunder/Martian Manhunter featured the deaths of New Gods Grayven and Speed Queen at the hands of a mysterious God-Killer, while the New God Knockout was killed in Birds of Prey #109. This appears to be leading into the Death of the New Gods limited series written and drawn by Jim Starlin, which saw the demise of all of the characters created by Jack Kirby for his "Fourth World" metaseries. After the conclusion of the Death of the New Gods limited series, DC editorial revealed that the "Fourth World" concept would be replaced by a "Fifth World" concept some time in the future.

In Captain Carrot and the Final Ark (October 2007), written by Bill Morrison, with art by co-creator Scott Shaw, the Zoo Crew reunite in the midst of growing strife between the land and the sea creatures of Earth-26, sparked by Starro. Unfortunately, they encounter Starro and most of their powers are neutralized, except for Pig-Iron. Furthermore, that Earth is rendered uninhabitable, and the Crew has an ocean liner loaded with refugees transported off the planet by the Just'a Lotta Animals. Unfortunately, the ship is accidentally sent to New Earth. Although the Justice League encounter the ship and land it safely, all the passengers, including the Crew, are transformed into their animal forms indigenous to that Earth and, although they all apparently still have their human level intelligence, they are unable to speak. However, some time in the future, the Crew will discover that their forms and powers have been restored. In Final Crisis #7, Captain Carrot is seen in the climactic battle with his "humanity" and powers restored, and Pig-Iron is with him.

== Secondary titles ==
Countdown: Arena was a four-part series featuring Monarch organizing a battle tournament between the heroes of the 52 universes, in order to determine who will be worthy of joining his army.

Countdown to Adventure follows the adventures of Starfire, Animal Man, and Adam Strange after their return home in 52. Starfire and Animal Man continue with life on Earth, although their powers are not entirely reliable despite ample time to readjust to Earth's environment, while Adam Strange is replaced as the guardian of the planet Rann by an ultra-violent Hollywood actor named Champ Hazard. Meanwhile, the return of Lady Styx is heralded on Earth and Rann by zombie-like outbursts of three words: "Believe in her." Backup stories within Countdown to Adventure feature Forerunner and Monarch and expand upon both her origin story and her journey through the Multiverse, including an alternate history version of the Justice League had the Nazi's won World War 2 with the JLA being organized by Hitler.

Countdown to Mystery features the adventures of Kent V. Nelson becoming Doctor Fate. In a backup story, Eclipso seduces the heroes of the DC Universe, tying into Countdown appearances with Mary Marvel and begins with the corruption of Plastic Man and Darkseid's revelation that he is Eclipso's true creator and that Eclipso's black diamond was mined on the planet Apokolips.

The Countdown Presents: The Search for Ray Palmer one-shots expand on the Challengers' quest to find former Atom Ray Palmer.

Countdown Presents: Lord Havok and the Extremists concerns events on Earth-8 and how they impact the future of the multiverse and the Countdown to Final Crisis limited series.

== Promotional campaign ==
At the New York Comic Con in 2007, DC distributed four pins, with the option of a fifth, promoting storylines in Countdown. The first four pins say: "WWMMD?" ("What Would Mary Marvel Do?"), "I Found Ray Palmer", "Look to the Skies!" and "Jimmy Olsen Must Die!". The final pin says, "Darkseid Rules!"

The first teaser image for Countdown, by Phil Jimenez. DC released image captioned: "Let the battle cry be heard in the land, a shout of great destruction..."

A teaser poster was released, which shows Wonder Woman comforting Superman, Batman in a different costume (with a sword and what appears to be chain mail armor) and Donna Troy wearing her Wonder Girl costume again. Kyle Rayner is wearing a yellow ring, and Mary Marvel is shown partially in shadow. Mister Miracle stands next to Big Barda. Also notable among the poster is a Legion flight ring, a minuscule red hand (the Atom's) sticking out of the rubble, and the bodies of Blue Beetle (Ted Kord), Maxwell Lord, The Question (Vic Sage), and Jade — major or notable heroes who had recently died. The heroes are gathered around the head of the Statue of Liberty; the headless body of the statue can be seen in the background.

While alternately revealing and retracting his statements about Jason Todd being the new Red Robin, Dan DiDio confirmed the latter within the pages of DC Comics as of July 2007. DiDio had also previously mentioned that Barry Allen would be the returning Flash.

In later interviews, Dan DiDio finally explained the symbolism of the image in light of the fact that a second was soon to be released.

Released with books published on July 5, 2007, in the DC Nation: #68 column, DiDio described the picture's symbolism: "Anyone standing on barren ground is doomed. In this case, it spells the Death of the New Gods...The yellow ring corrupts Kyle (Rayner) in The Sinestro Corps War...Jason Todd becomes Red Robin, driving a wedge in the Challengers from Beyond...Green Arrow struggles to win the love of Black Canary...Batman, in symbolic garb, wields the sword that hearkens the return of a deadly foe (Ra's al Ghul)...Dressed in Barry's costume, Bart (Allen, the Flash) showed that he had one foot in the grave...A Legionnaire is lost and marked for death in Countdown...The Atom, lost, struggles to survive...The shield marked Hippolyta's return...Superman and Wonder Woman discuss parent issues...Is that a Boom Tube I see, and can that be the path to salvation?...The shadow of evil falls over Mary Marvel...and the statue head, reminiscent of and tied to Kamandi #1, also reflects Sinestro's upcoming visit to the Big Apple."

The second teaser image for Countdown, by Ethan Van Sciver.

A second teaser image was released by DC comics to the website Newsarama.com. Drawn by Ethan Van Sciver with the caption "...And Evil Shall Inherit The Earth". It depicts various DC characters and Dan DiDio states that it '...will get us to the end of Countdown.'

A series of promotional posters highlighting the main characters in Countdown was released over several months. They also appeared as full paged ads in several comic books and several issues of Wizard magazine. These include:

- Eclipso extending a hand to Mary Marvel and a message that reads "Seduction of the Innocent".
- An angry Ray Palmer under a magnifying glass with the message "I Found Ray Palmer!".
- Jimmy Olsen looking up from the bottom of the poster with the message "Jimmy Olsen Must Die!"
- The hands of the Trickster and the Pied Piper handcuffed together, reading "Villains Defiant!"
- Darkseid's face with the message "Unto Man Shall Come... A Great Disaster".

A series of in-house ads ran through DC's comic books based on the pins and posters. All of them were illustrated by Ryan Sook. These include:

- Eclipso wearing a "What Would Mary Marvel Do?" button.
- Red Robin wearing an "I Found Ray Palmer!" button.
- The Joker wearing a "Jimmy Olsen Must Die" Button on his lapel. Another image has the Joker grinning while wearing Jimmy's press pass, bowtie, and Superman signal watch.
- Granny Goodness wearing a "Darkseid Rules!" button.
- Superman wearing a "Look to the Skies!" button.

A series of in-house ads for series undergoing revamps also appeared. These ads incorporated the series' title as a partial crumbling stone block on a white background and the tagline "The Countdown continues". All of them were illustrated by Ryan Sook.

== Reception ==
=== Critical reaction ===
IGN criticized Countdown and called it one of the worst event comics, noting its general lack of focus, uninteresting plot threads, and its overall pointlessness due to being contradicted in the early issues of Final Crisis. Author Rokk of Comic Book Revolution, in their review of the final issue, opined that Countdown was "horribly plotted and paced", being a "flawed and poorly conceived idea", and criticized the handling of characters and the lack of character development. Columnist Sara Century, of Comic Book Herald, in a retrospective of the maxi-series, criticized, among other flaws, the handling of female characters, like Mary Marvel, its "repetitive story beats", "wildly flat characterization", and lack of stakes. Amadeo Gandolfi, in Kiel University's academic journal Closure, compared the maxiseries to its subsequent event, Final Crisis, calling the former "messy, absurd and overhyped".

=== Sales figures ===
Sales of Countdown began with issue #51 selling 91,054 orders from Diamond Comics Distributors, making it the nineteenth best-selling comic book in May 2007. After the first issue, sales steadily dropped to a low of 72,077 copies with issue #40. Sales of subsequent issues briefly jumped to a high of approximately 88,000 copies per issue, before gradually declining into the 67,000 range.

== In other media ==
In 2010 GraphicAudio produced an audiobook based on Countdown, written by Greg Cox. It runs for 8 hours. It excludes the plots of: Karate Kid and Triplicate Girl, the Morticoccus, Trickster and Pied Piper, Ryan Choi, Monarch, Superboy-Prime, Kyle Rayner, Duela Dent, Belthera, Klarion, Steel, Kamandi and Brother Eye, as well as other elements, such as merging Monitors Bob and Solomon into one being, omitting the destruction of Earth-51 and having Infinity-Man battle Darkseid instead of Orion.

== Collected editions ==
The series has been collected into four trade paperbacks:

- Volume 1 (collects #51-39, 296 pages, May 2008, ISBN 1-4012-1789-3)
- Volume 2 (collects #38-26, 296 pages, July 2008, ISBN 1-4012-1824-5)
- Volume 3 (collects #25-13, 296 pages, October 2008, ISBN 1-4012-1911-X)
- Volume 4 (collects #12-1, 272 pages, November 2008, ISBN 1-4012-1912-8)

Other connected collections include:

- Countdown: Arena #1-4 (168 pages, August 2008, DC Comics, ISBN 1-4012-1822-9, Titan Books, ISBN 1-84576-867-1)
- Countdown to Adventure #1-8 (192 pages, August 2008, DC Comics, ISBN 1-4012-1823-7, Titan Books, ISBN 1-84576-866-3)
- Countdown to Mystery #1-8 (160 pages, September 2008, DC Comics, ISBN 1-84576-866-3)
- Countdown Presents: The Search for Ray Palmer Crime Society #1; Gotham by Gaslight #1; Red Rain #1; Red Son #1; Superwoman/Batwoman #1; Wildstorm #1 (168 pages, July 2008, DC Comics, ISBN 1-4012-1798-2, Titan Books, ISBN 1-84576-868-X)
- Countdown Presents: Lord Havok & the Extremists 1-6 (144 pages, September 2008, ISBN 1-4012-1844-X, Titan Books, October 2008, ISBN 1-84856-121-0)
- Captain Carrot and the Final Ark #1-3
- Outsiders: Five of a Kind Nightwing/Boomerang #1; Katana/Shazam #2; Martian Manhunter/Thunder #3; Metamorpho/Aquaman #4; Wonder Woman/Grace #5
- Countdown Special: Eclipso #1; Jimmy Olsen #1; Kamandi #1; OMAC #1; The Atom #1-2; The Flash #1; The New Gods #1
- Action Comics #852-854
- The All New Atom #14-15
- Detective Comics #837
- Supergirl #21-22
- Superman #665
- Teen Titans #47
