= Forerunner (DC Comics) =

Fictional DC Comics character

- Jason Todd and Forerunner from Countdown #46, art by Ed Benes.

Publication information
- Publisher: DC Comics
- First appearance: Countdown #46 (August 2007)
- Created by: Paul Dini (writer); Jimmy Palmiotti (writer); Justin Gray (writer); Jesus Saiz (artist)

In-story information
- Alter ego: Viza Aziv
- Species: Forerunner
- Place of origin: War World
- Partnerships: Monarch (Nathaniel Adam)
- Notable aliases: Harbinger
- Abilities: Superhuman speed and strength, flight, near-invulnerability, mild telepathy, momentary invisibility, other undisclosed inherited traits

Forerunner (Viva Aziv) is a fictional character published by DC Comics. She first appeared in Countdown #46 (August 2007), and was created by Paul Dini, Jimmy Palmiotti, Justin Gray and Jesus Saiz.

== Fictional character biography ==
The Forerunners originate from the Earth of an alternate universe, ravaged by years of destructive war. The other "Nine Houses" (planets and dwarf planets) of the Solar System declared the planet a War World in which they would battle for occupancy. Survivors of the wars - the strongest and fittest - remained on the planet and interbred, unknowingly guided to do so by the Monitors. The process produced the Forerunners, a species possessing traits of the beings from other planets such as Green Martians and Saturnians. When the Nine Houses decided that the Forerunners were a threat that had to be eliminated, the Monitors intervened and formed a pact with the Nine Houses to keep the Forerunners from moving against the Nine Houses. For their own purposes, the Monitors appointed one Forerunner as their Instrument of Righteous Death, whom they also called Harbinger.

Viza Aziv is a member of a genetically engineered race of warriors tasked with serving the Monitors, and was assigned to kill anomalous beings inhabiting the multiverse. In her first appearance, she battles Jason Todd and Donna Troy as they are investigating the death of Duela Dent. After failing to eliminate the two, Viza is denounced by one of the Monitors and suffers a crisis of confidence. Vowing to stay on Earth until she regains the trust of the Monitors, Forerunner is recruited by Captain Atom (now called Monarch), who gives her an armada to wage war against the Monitors.

=== Countdown to Final Crisis ===
Monarch discloses that Viza Aziv was chosen as the Monitors' warrior because they feared something in her: she was an unexpected outcome of the breeding program which created the Forerunners. Viza is sent by Monarch to recruit the JLA's of Earth-10 and the Conjurers of Earth-33. The Conjurers are forewarned of Viza's arrival by Dark Angel, resulting in Forerunner being overpowered and captured. However, she is rescued by Monarch.

Monarch informs Forerunner that the Arena tournament is about to begin, and that he no longer needs her services. He teleports her to an unknown region of space. Forerunner is rescued by a passing freight ship, which she takes control of after killing the captain. The ship is attacked by a Thanagarian fleet. Forerunner challenges and defeats the fleet's leader, Golden Eagle, in single combat. Viza invokes the law of choice, which allows her to take Golden Eagle as her prize; essentially enslaving him. The ship reaches the Source Wall, which has a gaping hole at its center.

After passing through the Source, Forerunner's ship is depleted of energy. The ship ends up trapped in space, and the crew are contacted by a sentient planet, who offers them the fuel they need in return for escorting a young planet across the sector. During the trip, they are attacked, and, at the young planet's request, Forerunner places a drop of her blood onto its land, which will allow the planet to make a new Forerunner race from Viza's blood. Viza decides to stay with the planet, and become the new race's Thought Mother.

== Powers and abilities ==
Viza Aziv possesses superhuman strength, durability, and speed. She possesses telepathy and the ability to become temporarily invisible. Viza wields gloves with sharply tipped fingers that she can use as weapons.
