= Batman: In Darkest Knight =

1994 comic book

- Batman: In Darkest Knight (1994)

Publication information
- Publisher: DC Comics
- Format: One-shot
- Publication date: 1994
- No. of issues: 1
- Main character(s): Batman; Sinestro

Creative team
- Written by: Mike W. Barr
- Artist: Jerry Bingham

Batman: In Darkest Knight is a one-shot comic book, published in 1994 and written by Mike W. Barr with art by Jerry Bingham. The comic is an Elseworlds story in which Bruce Wayne becomes the Green Lantern instead of Hal Jordan. This one change creates a domino effect which alters many events and characters in the DC Universe. The story draws heavily from related Batman comics, including Batman: Year One and The Killing Joke.

The comic is dedicated to the memory of Bill Finger, who was "present at the birth of both" according to the afterword.

== Plot ==
The story begins after Bruce Wayne's disastrous first attempt at crimefighting. As he sits in his study, wounded, he pleads with his dead father's image for some means by which to terrify the criminals of Gotham City. Suddenly, a ghostly image comes from a bust before him, telling him that he has been chosen.

The figure heals his wounds and leads him to a crashed rocket on his property. Inside, the dying Green Lantern Abin Sur gives Bruce his power ring and tells him to wait for contact from its masters. Bruce hides the rocket and Sur's power battery in the cave beneath his mansion.

Quickly mastering the ring's power, Bruce first uses it to capture the Red Hood robbers at a chemical plant. Using a combination of his powers and skills, Bruce manages to subdue all three and turn them over to James Gordon, thus preventing the creation of the Joker. As Bruce flies off, Gordon tells district attorney Harvey Dent that he mistrusts vigilantes, especially those with superpowers.

Shortly afterwards, the Guardians of the Universe give Bruce his first official mission: stopping the errant, power-hungry Sinestro, who abuses his Green Lantern ring for personal gain. Bruce manages to subdue Sinestro, leaving the people he once dominated despondent. When one of them, Katma Tui, says that Bruce is their hero, he gives her Sinestro's power ring before returning to Oa. Sinestro swears vengeance on Bruce before he is banished to Qward.

Back on Earth, Bruce goes to Gordon and asks for help in figuring out the identity of his parents' killer (without divulging his identity). Initially refusing, Gordon later sets to work and has almost found the answer when Sinestro appears, bearing a yellow power ring from the Weaponers of Qward. He steals the information, kills Gordon, and tracks down Joe Chill to absorb his mind in the mistaken belief that Chill knows how to defeat Batman. Driven insane by Chill's sociopathy, Sinestro ambushes Bruce. Despite Sinestro's superior power, Bruce is able to defeat him, and the villain decides to change tactics.

Days later, Bruce is attacked on patrol by Dent, now hideously scarred by the yellow ring he bears, and cat burglar Selina Kyle, who has been given a special violet ring that feeds on her unrequited love for Bruce. He bests the duo, but the experience makes him paranoid, and he creates a network of satellites to surround Earth. During his absence, Sinestro has been causing chaos on other planets in the sector, causing the Guardians to question Bruce's role as a Lantern. When Bruce declares that the people of Earth are his sole concern, the Guardians bestow rings on Clark Kent, Queen Hippolyta of the Amazons, and Barry Allen, tasking them with upholding Bruce's responsibilities.

Bruce is then confronted by a squad of Lanterns led by Katma Tui, who informs him that she has orders from the Guardians to confiscate his ring. Taking advantage of the distraction, Sinestro and his followers attack Bruce's cave, injuring Alfred Pennyworth in the process. Bruce is subdued, but senses that Alfred is in danger and regains his ring as it responds to his will. Rushing home, he finds Alfred dead of his injuries and Sinestro escaped. The three Lanterns ask him for guidance, but Bruce - finally accepting his responsibility as a Lantern - entrusts them with protecting Earth while he hunts down Sinestro.

== Multiverse ==
Batman: In Darkest Knight takes place on Earth 32 in the DC Comics multiverse. The story's version of Bruce Wayne appears in the series Countdown: Arena, where he and two other Green Lanterns fight against Monarch.

== In other media ==
Batman as a Green Lantern appears as a playable character in Lego Batman 3: Beyond Gotham.
