= Paula von Gunther =

- Baroness Paula von Gunther in JLA #8 (August 1997). Art by Oscar Jimenez.

Publication information
- Publisher: DC Comics
- First appearance: Sensation Comics #4 (April 1942)
- Created by: William Moulton Marston; H. G. Peter

In-story information
- Full name: Baroness Paula von Gunther
- Notable aliases: Dark Angel, Warmaster
- Abilities: Brilliant strategist and scientist; Amazon training

Baroness Paula von Gunther is a fictional character appearing in DC Comics publications and related media, commonly as a foe of the superhero Wonder Woman. She debuted in 1942's Sensation Comics (vol. 1) #4, written by Wonder Woman creator William Moulton Marston and illustrated by Harry G. Peter, and holds a distinction as Wonder Woman's first recurring adversary. Though in her earliest appearances she was a cold-blooded Nazi spy and saboteur, the Baroness would reform into Wonder Woman's ally (albeit one who occasionally lapsed into villainy), appearing in Wonder Woman stories throughout the Golden, Silver and Bronze Age of Comics.

After DC Comics rebooted its continuity in 1985 (in a publication event known as the Crisis on Infinite Earths), Wonder Woman, her supporting characters and many of her foes were re-imagined and reintroduced. Though initially absent in this revised set of storylines, the Baroness would eventually be reintroduced to the continuity in 1998 by Wonder Woman writer/artist John Byrne who returned the character to her roots as a villainous Nazi mastermind. Re-imagined by Byrne as a devotee of the occult who placed her mystical knowledge at the service of the Third Reich, she became a vessel for the malevolent supernatural entity Dark Angel.

The Baroness has been adapted into several Wonder Woman-related television projects. She was played by Christine Belford in 1975 on the live-action ABC TV series Wonder Woman, and voiced by Eliza Schneider in the 2011 Warner Bros animated series Batman: The Brave and the Bold.

== Fictional character biography ==
=== Pre-Crisis ===
==== Golden Age ====
The Golden Age Baroness alongside a captive Steve Trevor in Sensation Comics (vol. 1) #4 (April 1942); art by Harry G. Peter.

A member of the noble class in pre-National Socialist Germany with the rank of Baroness, Paula von Gunther first appeared as a foe of Wonder Woman. She battled the Amazon numerous times as an agent of the Gestapo. Her many crimes include murdering many individuals, keeping a small group of women as personal slaves and torturing them routinely, was for a time the leader of all Gestapo operations in the United States, forcing American female citizens into becoming Nazi spies, attempting to kidnap a Colonel using an invisible ray on a ship while impersonating a high-society lady and stealing Wonder Woman's lasso while trying to steal secrets from security officers. She succeeded in capturing Wonder Woman with it and bound her hand and foot to a wooden pole using it. However Wonder Woman got off the pole and broke open a cage freeing a young boy named Freddy. He untied her hands, but Gunther returned and stopped Wonder Woman by pointing a gun at her back. Freddy lassoed Gunther, and Wonder Woman stopped her plan. She once tried to monopolize America's milk supply and charge high prices for it so that its people would have weak bones and fall before the stronger-boned Nazis after buying all the milk of a company for five years with seven million dollars. In her first appearance she discovered Wonder Woman's weakness, which is if her bracelets were chained by a man she becomes as weak as an ordinary woman. While monopolizing milk, her men lassoed Wonder Woman and bound her hand and foot with chains. She was bound to railway tracks, but was able to free herself.

Von Gunther was finally captured and revealed that she had worked for the Nazis because they held her daughter Gerta captive. Von Gunther reformed and pledged her loyalty to Wonder Woman after Gerta was rescued. Von Gunther even put her own life in peril to save Wonder Woman from a burning munitions plant, suffering third-degree burns and a horribly scarred face.

Von Gunther went to trial, but Wonder Woman acted as her defense and got her off. Murder charges had to be thrown out on double jeopardy, because Paula had previously been tried, convicted and executed for that crime in the electric chair, but her henchmen had revived her with an electrical machine she had invented after the Doctor gave her body to them (Sensation Comics #7). Von Gunther later escaped by tying up a guard and stealing her uniform, but was later recaptured by Wonder Woman. While in custody, Von Gunther risked her own life to stop a bomb from going off inside a munitions factory, and was burned as a result. Wonder Woman revealed Paula's scarred face to the jury, which was moved by Paula's heroic self-sacrifice and acquitted her of the remaining espionage and sabotage charges (Wonder Woman #3).

Paula returned to Paradise Island with her former slave girls and her daughter to live and undergo Amazon training. Queen Hippolyte moulded fine features on Paula's face, which the goddess Aphrodite blessed and magically converted into Paula's new face. Paula became the Amazons' chief scientist, spending part of her time on Paradise Island and part aiding Wonder Woman from a hidden underground laboratory beneath Holliday College. Her daughter Gerta also was a scientific savant, although her experiments sometimes led to accidents that needed Wonder Woman's help to fix. Gerta's enlarging ray, for example, was instrumental in helping Wonder Woman and Steve Trevor return to human size after escaping Atomia's atomic world, but also accidentally unleashed the menace of the Bughumans. At one point, her devices revived Wonder Woman, and another time, the Justice Society of America.

==== Silver Age ====
Her Earth-1 counterpart differed only slightly, as Baroness Paula von Gunta. The Earth-1 von Gunta appeared in Wonder Woman #163 and 168, before presumably following a similar path as the Earth-2 Paula and moving to Paradise Island to become an adopted Amazon and chief scientist.

The Earth-1 Paula was asked to replace Hippolyta as Amazon queen during a coup d'état, which was abruptly ended when the goddess Kore appeared to enlist the Amazons in a battle against the Anti-Monitor during the Crisis on Infinite Earths.

=== Post-Crisis ===
Following the events of the Crisis on Infinite Earths, it was revealed that the Baroness fought Hippolyta during the time-traveling queen's World War II adventures as Wonder Woman.

This Von Gunther was a mistress of the occult and became the human host for the evil wandering spirit, Dark Angel. Dark Angel became a dedicated foe of Hippolyta and was inadvertently responsible for the origin of Wonder Girl (Donna Troy).

Donna Troy was able to defeat Dark Angel, and at some point Dark Angel separated herself from von Gunther. The Baroness was last seen living among the Amazons.

Eventually, it was revealed that Dark Angel was not a mystical spirit but an extant multiversal doppelganger of Donna Troy.

=== DC Rebirth ===
Baroness Paula von Gunther as Warmaster in Wonder Woman (vol. 5) Annual #3 (2019), art by V. Ken Mario, Sandu Florea and Hi-Fi Design

After the events of DC Rebirth, Paula von Gunther's origin is altered. As a young girl, Helen was rescued by Wonder Woman from the violent nationalists group known as the Sons of Liberty. She was adopted by Harold and Petra Paul, though Wonder Woman continued to be present in Helen's life. As an adult, Helen joined A.R.G.U.S. However, she soon learned from the supervillain Leviathan that her birth parents were faction leaders of the Sons of Liberty and that her oldest ancestor is Gudra, a valkyrie with a grudge against the Amazons of Themyscira after they struck down her sisters on a supposed mission of peace. Helen, realizing Wonder Woman had lied to her, returned to her true name of Paula von Gunther and adopted the codename Warmaster.

As Warmaster, Paula began to assemble a group of female supervillains who have faced Wonder Woman in the past. She started with Devastation, who had been fighting with the hero Firebrand. The pair made their headquarters in Norway, and Warmaster revealed to Devastation that when she touched the Spear of Gudra, she heard the voices of her valkyrie ancestors who demanded Warmaster destroy the Amazons who had betrayed them. Warmaster later traveled to Canada and recruited Armageddon, a descendant of ogres that had previously fought Wonder Woman. Lastly, Warmaster released Genocide from her tomb deep within a cave near the Tyrrhenian Sea.

While Devastation and Armageddon battled Donna Troy, Warmaster summoned Wonder Woman to her base in Norway. There, she battled Wonder Woman and managed to pierce the superheroine's shoulder with the Spear of Gudra. She threatened to have Genocide kill all the heroes guarding the portal to Themyscira unless Wonder Woman opened it and allowed her inside. When Wonder Woman refused, Paula fled, collapsing the building atop of Wonder Woman, but she was rescued by Donna Troy, who had managed to defeat Devastation and Armageddon. Despite Wonder Woman's refusal to help, Genocide managed to force her way into Themyscira with Paula who battled the Amazons upon their arrival. Wonder Woman and Donna joined the fight quickly, with Donna battling Genocide alongside the Amazon Nubia, while Wonder Woman duelled Paula. Eventually Wonder Woman managed to persuade Paula that neither of them truly knew if it was the Amazons or Valkyries that instigated the fight which killed Paula's ancestors. Paula yielded and Donna was able to defeat Genocide. While a Phantom Stranger appeared to try and claim Paula's soul for the sins of her ancestor, Wonder Woman managed to fend him off and Paula volunteered to stay in Themyscira to be reformed, believing that the only thing she could truly trust was Wonder Woman's word.

== Powers and abilities ==
Pre-Crisis, Paula von Gunther had (after receiving training) standard Amazon powers, such as superhuman strength capable of breaking chains and leaping great heights, speed and stamina enough to deflect bullets and other projectiles from her Amazon bracelets. She was also a skilled hand-to-hand combatant.

Post-Crisis, von Gunther was empowered when possessed by Dark Angel, who had vast powers and was able to perform a variety of feats including mind control, altering her size, teleportation and altering the time stream.

Post-Rebirth, Helen Paul is a highly decorated A.R.G.U.S. Agent who graduated at the top of her class early on in life, being an avid spy and combatant at the age of 16. After having acquired the spear of Gudra; her great Valkyrie ancestor, she would gain vast empowerment through the heretical memory of all amongst the Von Gunther line whom fought against the Amazons in the past. She has also equipped herself with a vast assortment of secretive spy networking paraphernalia pinched by the Leviathan organization, acquired from its time during a globe spanning secret service agency annexation.

== Other versions ==
=== Blue Amazon ===
In the original graphic novel Wonder Woman: The Blue Amazon, Paula von Gunther appears as a member of the Savanti, a trio of scientists who led humanity to live on Mars.

=== DC Bombshells ===
Baroness von Gunther appears as a Nazi commander in the DC Comics Bombshells universe.

=== The Legend of Wonder Woman ===
Baroness von Gunther appears as a minor antagonist in the Legend of Wonder Woman series. She mentions that she battled Wonder Woman on several occasions, and is allied with the Nazi party until Wonder Woman saves her daughter, Gerta.

=== Wonder Woman: Earth One ===
Baroness Paula von Gunther appears in the second volume of Wonder Woman: Earth One by writer Grant Morrison and artist Yanick Paquette. She is passionately obsessed with Wonder Woman from the moment they met, and she wanted to rule a world of women together with her, where men were slaves. Here she is given the alias of "Uberfraulein".

== In other media ==
Christine Belford as the Baroness in episode 1 of the ABC TV series Wonder Woman: "Wonder Woman Meets Baroness von Gunther" (1976).

- Paula von Gunther appears in Wonder Woman (1975), portrayed by Christine Belford.

The Baroness in episode 56 of Batman: The Brave and the Bold, "Scorn of the Star Sapphire!" (2011), designed by James Tucker.

- Paula von Gunther appears in the Batman: The Brave and the Bold episode "The Scorn of the Star Sapphire!", voiced by Eliza Schneider. This version has a hooded cloak similar to the Wonder Woman (1975) incarnation.

== See also ==
- List of Wonder Woman enemies
- List of Wonder Woman supporting characters
