= Dark Angel (DC Comics) =

- Dark Angel; Art by: John Byrne

Publication information
- Publisher: DC Comics
- First appearance: Wonder Woman (vol. 2) #131 (March 1998)
- Created by: John Byrne

In-story information
- Alter ego: Baroness Paula Von Gunther; Donna Troy
- Species: Ghost
- Abilities: Mind control; Size alteration; Teleportation; Chronokinesis; Immortality

Dark Angel is a DC Comics supervillain who battled Wonder Woman. She is a wandering spirit who inhabited the body of Baroness Paula Von Gunther during World War II. Recently it was revealed that Dark Angel was, in fact, the Donna Troy of the Pre-Crisis Earth-7, saved from certain death by the Anti-Monitor.

The character first appeared in Wonder Woman (vol. 2) #131 (March 1998).

== Fictional character biography ==
The bringer of doom known as Dark Angel has long bedevilled humans foolish enough to summon her. During World War II, Baroness Paula Von Gunther, (pre-Crisis, a brilliant Nazi saboteur who eventually became one of Wonder Woman's staunchest allies, who became post-Crisis a Nazi occult mistress), called forth this wandering evil spirit, who then took over Von Gunther's body and attacked Wonder Woman and the Justice Society with her mythic might.

Hippolyta battled Dark Angel on many occasions, and eventually Dark Angel appeared on Themyscira. She intended to kidnap Princess Diana, but instead kidnapped her magical double. She forced the double (who she thought was Diana) to live thousands of lifetimes, each one ending in tragedy. She hoped the cumulative effect would drive Hippolyta insane. Instead, the double was able to grow stronger, and finally became an independent entity now known as Donna Troy.

Donna Troy was able to defeat Dark Angel, and at some point Dark Angel separated herself from von Gunther. The Baroness was last seen living among the Amazons.

=== Return of Donna Troy ===
In the 2005 Return of Donna Troy mini-series, Donna Troy discovered that Dark Angel was in fact her counterpart from Earth-Seven and was saved from the burning apartment by the Anti-Monitor, who raised her to serve him much as the Monitor had saved and raised Harbinger. When the Multiverse was reconfigured in one single Universe, Dark Angel, who had somehow escaped the compression of every Donna Troy into one single person in the new Earth, sought to kill Donna and make her relive the lives of the other alternate Donnas as a way to avoid the merging and remain the last one standing. When Dark Angel was defeated, Donna became the real sum of every Donna Troy that existed on every Earth, a living key to the lost Multiverse.

=== One Year Later ===
The continuity-altering effects of 52 and Infinite Crisis resulted in a new multiverse. A new Dark Angel has appeared, although it is not yet known if she is a multiversal counterpart to Donna Troy or if she has a different origin altogether, although a comment from the character in Countdown to Adventure #4 implies she is at least partially both versions. She commented: "I have survived all manner of crises and served Monitor and Anti-Monitor alike".

A year after the events of Infinite Crisis, Dark Angel appeared as the servant for the New 52 Monitors, each born from different Multiverse creations. Dark Angel tested Supergirl to see if she was indeed the proper persona for existence in the current DC Universe. After the test, she told Supergirl that her job is to prod and provoke questionable entities or anomalies so they could ensure their veracity in the world. Believing Supergirl to be out of place in the timestream, Dark Angel plans to erase Supergirl's existence, but stopped by one of the Monitors before she can do so and got reassigned for another task. This task is also later revealed to be the destruction of War World, Forerunner's home planet.

She later pursues Donna Troy, Kyle Rayner and Jason Todd throughout the Multiverse (possibly at the Monitors' behest), thus inquiring the denizens of the Wildstorm Universe (Earth-50) as to whether her lookalike had passed through. Dark Angel next appears in Countdown to Adventure #3, disguised as an Oracle on Earth-33, plus turning the conjurers against Forerunner when she arrives. She then sheds her disguise, attacks Forerunner, and kills the Earth-33 version of Starman before she is defeated. She escapes before Forerunner can finish her.

== Powers and abilities ==
Dark Angel is a sorceress capable of casting various magic spells and traversing spacetime and is nearly immortal.

== See also ==
- List of Wonder Woman enemies
