= Countdown: Arena =

Limited series

- Cover to Countdown: Arena #1.

Publication information
- Publisher: DC Comics
- Schedule: Weekly
- Format: Mini-series
- Genre: Superhero
- Publication date: December 2007
- No. of issues: 4
- Main character(s): Monarch; Superman; Batman; Wonder Woman; Green Lantern; The Flash; Blue Beetle; Nightshade; Starman; The Ray

Creative team
- Written by: Keith Champagne
- Penciller: Scott McDaniel

Collected editions
- Countdown: Arena: ISBN 1-4012-1822-9

Countdown: Arena is a four-issue American comic book mini-series published by DC Comics. Written by Keith Champagne with illustrations by Scott McDaniel, it was released over four weeks in December 2007.

The series is a spin-off from Countdown, and features the character Monarch (Nathaniel Adam) organizing battles among various characters from the 52 Earths of the Multiverse. Monarch selects those he deems fit to join his army in preparation for a confrontation against the Monitors. His goal is to build a powerful strike team by seeking alternates of prominent characters such as Superman, Batman, Wonder Woman, Green Lantern, the Flash, Blue Beetle, Nightshade, Starman, and the Ray.

== Summary ==
Monarch's battles commence with the selection of Eve of Shadows (Earth-13), Vampire Batman (Earth-43), Ray "the Ray" Palmer (Earth-6), Scarab (Earth-26), Hal Jordan Jr. (Earth-12), Starwoman (Earth-7), Johnny Quick (Earth-3), and Wonder Woman (Earth-34) as his champions. Additionally, the Batman of Earth-19 and Apollo of Earth-50 are designated as Monarch's "backups" and are held in stasis.

Throughout the series, tensions develop between the all-American Superman of Earth-31 and his Russian counterpart from Earth-30. Superman-31 and Vampire Batman discover that a transporter, ingeniously designed by Earth-33's Ted Kord, has the capability to traverse the multiverse. Upon realizing the connection between Monarch and Captain Atom, Breach volunteers to gather other counterparts from across the 52 Earths to challenge Monarch's power.

In the series' conclusion, the battle between the Supermen is interrupted by a surge of alternate Captain Atoms. Monarch manages to overpower and absorb these alternate Captain Atoms into himself, revealing Kord and Breach (actually the brainwashed Breach of New Earth, not of Earth-8) as his accomplices. Breach ultimately betrays Monarch by giving Superman-31 the transporter, enabling him to save everyone on the ship. The Red Son Superman of Earth-30 emerges as the last man standing after Superman-31's departure and Superman of Earth-16's sacrifice, becoming Monarch's final team member.

== Battles ==
=== Nightshades ===
- Eve of Shadows of Earth-13: A sorceress named Eve Eden who possesses the ability to manipulate shadows and control a shadow realm. She is married to Brigadier Atom.
- Eve Eden: A Nightshade who bears similarities to her counterpart on New Earth, with the power to manipulate and control darkness.
- The Shade, a female figure characterized by her use of a cane and a top hat, possessing the ability to control all shadows.

In a conflict, The Shade attacks Eve Eden and another Nightshade, revealing that she has not committed a killing in nearly two days. During the altercation, Nightshade's limbs are severed by The Shade. Eve of Shadows then manages to transport The Shade into an alternate dimension known as the Shadowlands, where The Shade is ultimately defeated. Despite this victory, Eve of Shadows' actions lead to the destruction of her husband and country, as she violated Monarch's rule prohibiting escape attempts.

=== Batman Variants ===
- Batman of Earth-19: Originating in the 1880s, this Batman began his career by defeating Jack the Ripper.
- Batman of Earth-40 (The Bat): Operating under the alias "The Bat," this Batman served as a covert government operative during World War II.
- Batman of Earth-43: After battling Dracula this Batman became a vampire.

The two human Batmen, from Earth-19 and Earth-40, collaborate to combat the vampire Batman of Earth-43. They initially succeed in blinding the vampire Batman with daggers, poisoning it with a cyanide capsule, and breaking its neck. However, the vampire Batman transforms into smoke and evades a fatal strike.

The remaining Batmen then decide to settle their differences using only their skills, without weapons or tricks. As they engage, the vampire Batman reappears behind the Batman of Earth-19. This distraction allows the Bat (Batman of Earth-40) to knock out Batman of Earth-19. Subsequently, the vampire Batman bites the Bat's neck and throws him aside but is interrupted by Monarch before he can further harm the fallen Batman.

Monarch then intervenes, removing the combatants from the arena and placing the Batman of Earth-19 in stasis as a "spare." Later, the Bat, having risen as a vampire, attacks Monarch's disposal crew.

=== The Ray Variants ===
- The Ray of Earth-10: This version of the Ray is depicted as a fascist, bearing a glowing swastika on his chest.
- Apollo of Earth-50: A member of the Wildstorm Universe's superhero group, the Authority. Though Apollo is not an analogue of Ray, Monarch grouped him with the other two due to their solar-powered abilities.
- Ray Palmer of Earth-6: Formerly the Atom of his Earth, Ray retains his size-changing belt in addition to light controlling powers as the Ray.

The Ray of Earth-10 attempts to escape the arena immediately but is thwarted by a force field. He then assaults the other two Rays, blinding Apollo with a blast of light. Palmer intervenes, aiding the Nazi Ray in an escape attempt, which prompts Monarch to kill the Ray of Earth-10 for breaking the rules.

In the ensuing confusion, Apollo mistakenly attacks Palmer, thinking he is Monarch. Using his size-changing abilities, Palmer shrinks and infiltrates Apollo's head, blasting him internally. This incapacitating move leaves Apollo alive but defeated. Monarch then places Apollo in stasis, alongside his "spare" Batman.

=== Blue Beetles ===
- Ted Kord of Earth-33: A giant, man-sized blue beetle that serves as the pet of Mr. and Mrs. Kord on his world.
- Danny Garrett of Earth-39: A Dan Garrett whose scarab has bonded with him similarly to how the scarab on New Earth bonded with Jaime Reyes.
- Scarab: A swarm of Blue Beetles from Earth-26, though they were mistakenly labeled as being from Earth-21 when first introduced.

In the confrontation, Danny's scarab abandons him to join the swarm of Blue Beetles, leaving Danny defenseless. The swarm then consumes Danny. Ted, the giant blue beetle, attempts to combat the swarm by crushing them piece by piece. However, the swarm infiltrates Ted's body and destroys him from the inside out, emerging victorious.

=== Green Lanterns ===
- Green Lantern of Earth-5: A Green Lantern named Hal Jordan who comes from a world home to Captain Marvel and the Marvel Family.
- Green Lantern of Earth-12: A Green Lantern named Hal Jordan III, grandson of the original Hal Jordan, from the world of Batman Beyond.
- Green Lantern of Earth-32: A Green Lantern named Bruce Wayne who found Abin Sur's power ring. Featured in Batman: In Darkest Knight.

Once in the arena the three Lanterns ally together and cover it with a green field, preventing Monarch from being able to observe them, and forcing him to burn his way inside. The three Lanterns attack him, but their combined attacks have no effect at all. The Green Lantern of Earth-32 turns off his ring's safeties in order to throw one, powerful blast at Monarch's face. The blast destroys the face-plate of Monarch's containment suit, resulting in a massive explosion which kills the Earth-5 Green Lantern and renders the other two unconscious. Hal Jordan of Earth-12, the first to rise, though missing an arm from earlier in battle, is recruited by Monarch. The Earth-32 Green Lantern is held in stasis.

=== Starmen ===
- Starwoman (Courtney Whitmore) of Earth-7: A brunette Starwoman equipped with a star rod.
- Starman of Earth-17: An intelligent gorilla who serves as a peacemaker on an Earth dominated by Kamandi. He also wields a star rod.
- Starman (Mikaal Tomas) of Earth-48: A male from "the black planet" endowed with cosmic abilities.

While waiting in the arena, the Starman of Earth-17 and Starwoman engage in conversation, anticipating the arrival of Mikaal Tomas, who is still engaged in an attack on Monarch aboard the Shiftship. Upon being teleported into the arena, Tomas immediately disintegrates the upper body of the gorilla Starman from Earth-17, aiming to secure a swift victory.

Following this, the Starman of Earth-48 charges at Starwoman. In self-defense, she blasts his face with her star rod, inadvertently decapitating him and securing her victory within seconds.

=== Flashes ===
- Jay Garrick of Earth-2: A World War II hero and member of the Justice Society of America.
- Lia Nelson of Earth-9: Known as the Flash of the Tangent Comics imprint, she possesses various light-related abilities.
- Johnny Quick of Earth-3: A member of the villainous Crime Society of America, and an evil counterpart to the Earth-2 Flash.

Quick pursues Nelson until Jay Garrick intervenes, delivering a punch that knocks Quick out. Subsequently, Nelson betrays Garrick and begins attacking him, asserting that she is not as weak as she had appeared on the ship. Garrick attempts to warn her about Quick, but she ignores him and is then incapacitated by Quick's vibrating punch.

Quick then challenges Garrick to a race. Garrick wins by throwing his helmet at Quick, who feigns critical injury. When Garrick stoops to help him, Quick delivers a vibro-punch to Garrick's neck, knocking him out and securing Quick's victory.

=== Wonder Women ===
- Wonder Woman of Earth-18: This Wonder Woman served as the sheriff of a western town in the 1890s.
- Wonder Woman of Earth-21: This Wonder Woman began her career in the 1940s.
- Wonder Woman of Earth-34: This Wonder Woman liberated women from the tyranny of King Jack in 19th-century England.

The three Wonder Women agree to fully commit to their battle. They engage in a fierce fight, exchanging punches and kicks. During the clash, just as the Wonder Woman of Earth-18 is about to stomp on the face of the Wonder Woman of Earth-21, she is knocked out by a punch to the neck from the Wonder Woman of Earth-34. The remaining two Wonder Women continue fighting, landing simultaneous blows to each other's heads. The Wonder Woman of Earth-34 is the first to rise and is declared the winner by Monarch.

=== Captain Atoms ===
- Breach (Major Tim Zanetti): He originates from New Earth, but is commonly thought to be from Earth-8.
- Ronnie Raymond and Nathaniel Adam of Earth-37: These two individuals merged to create Quantum-Storm.
- Captain Atom of Earth-38: Leader of his world's Atomic Knights.

As the final battle against Monarch approaches, the now-vampiric Bat uses a teleporter, constructed by Blue Beetle and powered by Breach, to send Breach across the Multiverse to gather more Captains Atom. Meanwhile, the Bat takes the other two Captains to rescue survivors. Breach successfully assembles a team of his counterparts, including Brigadier Atom of Earth-13, Kingdom Come Captain Atom of Earth-22, Charlton Comics Captain Atom of Earth-4, Soviet Atom of Earth-30, a Doctor Manhattan lookalike, President Atom, the robotic Quantum Mechanix, Quantum Boy, Captain Addama, a Hulk-like "Attum," and many others.

The Bat and the two Captains face Monarch and his army. Monarch reveals that he had orchestrated the construction of the teleporter by Earth-33's Ted Kord (though mistakenly referred to as being from Earth-6) to give the group false hope. He also reveals that Breach had been working for him all along and is actually New Earth's Breach, who survived Infinite Crisis and was brainwashed by Monarch.

Monarch proceeds to kill the Bat and the Captains Atom, absorbing their powers. He saves Earth-4's Captain Atom for last, expressing regret for sacrificing his morality to defeat the Monitors and taunting Captain Atom with the fact that a part of Monarch's personality exists within him. In a twist, Breach betrays Monarch by giving Earth-31's Superman the fully charged teleporter device to save the heroes from Monarch's holding cell. Monarch kills Breach for this betrayal, admitting that he intended to kill him regardless.

=== Supermen ===
- Superman of Earth-16: Verified by Keith Champagne as Christopher Kent, who in the main DC Universe is the biological son of General Zod. Earth-16 is known as the pre-Crisis world of the "Super-Sons," where Superman Jr. and Batman Jr. are the sons of the famous heroes. Initially, Christopher was thought to be from Earth-15, where Zod replaces Kal-El as Superman. However, Earth-15 and its heroes were destroyed by Superman-Prime before the events of Countdown: Arena.
- Superman of Earth-30: This Superman lands in Communist Russia 35 years earlier than Kal-El's arrival on Earth, leading the Soviet Union to conquer most of Earth-30. This character is similar to the one featured in Superman: Red Son.
- Superman of Earth-31: A super-patriotic Superman as depicted in All Star Batman and Robin the Boy Wonder, Batman: The Dark Knight Strikes Again, and Batman: The Dark Knight Returns.

The three Supermen engage in a fierce battle, with Chris Kent (Superman of Earth-16) initially holding a clear advantage. During the fight, the Supermen of Earth-30 and Earth-31 are nearly poisoned by radiation after flying out of the arena, but Chris saves them. The battle resumes, and Chris absorbs enough power from the other two Supermen to become a glowing red giant. He then attempts to destroy Monarch but dies in the effort.

The proceedings are interrupted by Breach, who brings every other version of Captain Atom from the Multiverse. Monarch kills them all, adding their atomic power to his own. Amidst the confusion, Breach, having freed himself from Monarch's control, gives the teleporter device to the Superman of Earth-31. He uses it to free Monarch's "spares" and escape. In the aftermath, the Superman of Earth-30 is the only fighter left alive in the arena, protected by the Earth-30 Captain Atom. Monarch adds the Earth-30 Superman to his roster as he prepares to attack the Monitors.

=== Other ===
A page from the comic, featured in Previews and online solicitations, highlights a diverse array of alternate characters, including:

- Earth-26 (animal) Teen Titans: A team consisting of anthropomorphic animal versions of the Teen Titans.
- alternate Firestorms: Variants of the character Firestorm from different realities.
- alternate Batgirls and Robins: Among them, one pair appears based on Batgirl and Robin: Thrillkiller while another Robin resembles his Pre-Crisis Earth-Two counterpart.
- an alternate Lobo: A version of the anti-hero Lobo from an alternate universe.
- Ultraa: A superhero from another alternate universe.
- L.E.G.I.O.N.: Characters from the Elseworlds story L.E.G.I.O.N. 90210,
- Justice Society of America members: Including Mister Terrific, Black Canary, Hourman, Doctor Mid-Nite, and from JSA: The Liberty Files
- JLA members: Including Aquaman, Martian Manhunter, Hawkgirl, and the Atom, resembling characters from the universe of JLA: The Nail.

Monarch obliterates all these characters shortly after bringing in the Superman of Earth-31, the final combatant, as a demonstration of his seriousness and ruthlessness.

== Website ==
In September 2007, DC launched an Arena website allowing fans to vote for which heroes would appear in Monarch's army. The voting was limited to alternate versions of Batman, Superman, Green Lantern, and Wonder Woman.

== Collected editions ==
The series has been collected into a trade paperback:

- Countdown: Arena (168 pages, August 2008, DC Comics, ISBN 1-4012-1822-9, Titan Books, ISBN 1-84576-867-1)
