= Donna Troy =

DC Comics superhero

- Donna Troy as depicted in Tales of the Titans #3 (September 2023). Art by Nicola Scott.

Publication information
- Publisher: DC Comics
- First appearance: The Brave and the Bold #60 (July 1965)
- Created by: Bob Haney and Bruno Premiani (after Robert Kanigher and Ross Andru)

In-story information
- Full name: Donna Hinckley Stacey Troy
- Species: Amazon
- Place of origin: Themyscira
- Team affiliations: Amazons; Teen Titans; Darkstars; Titans of Myth; Justice League
- Partnerships: Wonder Woman; Starfire; Bumblebee; Omen (Lilith Clay)
- Notable aliases: Wonder Girl; Darkstar; Troia; Wonder Woman; Deathbringer
- Abilities: See list: Superhuman strength, speed, reflexes, senses, durability, stamina and longevity; Accelerated healing factor; Flight; Divine empowerment; Psychically linked to Wonder Woman; Ability to flawlessly mimic any voice she knows or hears; Cold and Darkness Manipulation; Force Field Creation; Magic (Controls several forms and variations of magic); Immortality; Expert hand-to-hand combatant and martial artist; Use of Lasso of Persuasion, indestructible bracelets, sword and shield

Donna Troy is a superhero appearing in American comic books published by DC Comics. She is the original Wonder Girl, and later temporarily adopts another alias, Troia. Created by Bob Haney and Bruno Premiani, she first appeared in The Brave and the Bold #60 (July 1965) as Wonder Woman's younger sister and protégée, joining the Teen Titans during their second adventure. Donna has been commonly featured in stories involving the Titans, initially a group of superhero sidekicks which included Robin (Dick Grayson), Kid Flash (Wally West), and Aqualad (Garth), and is typically depicted as a founding member of the team.

Donna has appeared in numerous cartoon television shows and films. She made her live adaptation debut in the DC Universe/HBO Max series Titans, played by Conor Leslie.

== Fictional character biography ==
=== Introduction ===
Wonder Girl's original costume was patterned after Wonder Woman's. Art by Bruno Premiani, from The Brave and the Bold #60 (June 1965).

Wonder Girl adopts her classic red costume—and the secret identity Donna Troy—in Teen Titans #22 (July–August 1969). Art by Nick Cardy.

In May 1947's Wonder Woman #23 written by William Moulton Marston and illustrated by Harry G. Peter, the titular heroine (also known as Diana) is shown in flashback having adventures as a little girl. Twelve years later in April 1959's Wonder Woman #105, writer Robert Kanigher reprised the formula, this time featuring a flashback tale of Wonder Woman when she was a teen. Playfully dubbed "Wonder Girl" by another character, this teenaged version would return several times in flashback stories over the next several years, paralleling similar exploits of Superboy, the teen persona of DC Comics' flagship hero Superman. After the shake-up in the comics industry caused by Fredric Wertham's Seduction of the Innocent, DC Comics sought to make the adventures of Wonder Woman appear more wholesome and family-friendly. The result was August 1961's Wonder Woman #124 (also by Kanigher and Andru), which kicked off a series of out-of-continuity "Impossible Tales" in which Wonder Woman appeared alongside the teen "Wonder Girl" version of herself, as well as a toddler version called "Wonder Tot", and her mother Queen Hippolyta, creating a "Wonder Family".

The "Impossible Tale" label was dropped as of Wonder Woman #150 (November 1964), though Wonder Girl continued as a regular fixture in the publication through #155 (July 1965), both side by side with Wonder Woman as well as in her own solo stories. During this five-issue period, Wonder Girl is no longer referred to as an "impossible" younger variant of Wonder Woman. Though Wonder Girl and Wonder Woman do not directly call one another "sister" in these issues, Hippolyta does refer to them as her daughters, and all three repeatedly identify themselves as a family. Additionally, Wonder Girl is temporarily promoted to the book's headliner, receiving three full-length solo stories, including top-billing with her own logo predominating Wonder Woman's on the covers of issues #152 and #153. In July 1965, Wonder Girl concluded her regular presence in the Wonder Woman comic book with issue #155, while simultaneously appearing as a member of the newly-formed Teen Titans in The Brave and the Bold #60, written by Bob Haney and illustrated by Bruno Premiani.

The Teen Titans began as a "junior Justice League" consisting of Robin (Dick Grayson), Kid Flash (Wally West), and Aqualad (Garth), the sidekicks of Batman, the Flash, and Aquaman respectively. Wonder Girl would establish herself as a central character in Teen Titans stories, continuing to appear with the team in December 1965's Showcase #59, and in their spinoff into the first volume of the monthly Teen Titans comic in January 1966. However, no narrative information regarding Wonder Girl's precise identity was depicted until July 1969's Teen Titans #22, in which Wonder Girl is unequivocally identified as Wonder Woman's younger sister, a discrete character with her own identity who adopts the alias Donna Troy. It is established that Donna had been rescued from an apartment fire as an infant by Wonder Woman. Unable to find the baby's birth family, Wonder Woman brings her to Paradise Island to be raised by her mother Hippolyta, eventually enlisting the Amazon scientist Paula von Gunther (herself an expatriate from "Man's World") to use advanced technology to grant the girl powers like Wonder Woman's.

Donna remains with the Teen Titans until the series' cancellation with issue #43 in February 1973. She is still part of the team when the comic picks up again with #44 in November 1976. Teen Titans is canceled again in February 1978 with issue #53, with Donna and the others, no longer teens, going their separate ways.

=== 1980s revival ===
Marv Wolfman and George Pérez revived the series yet again in 1980 as The New Teen Titans, with original members Wonder Girl, Robin, and Kid Flash joined by new heroes Raven, Starfire, Cyborg, and Beast Boy / Changeling. Donna is romantically involved with much older professor Terry Long, but along the way is put under the romantic spell of Hyperion, one of the Titans of Myth.

Donna's origin is expanded in the January 1984 tale, "Who is Donna Troy?" Robin investigates the events surrounding the long ago fire after finding Donna's doll in a box from a coal bin. He learns that Donna's birth mother was Dorothy Hinckley, a dying unwed teen who had placed her for adoption. After Donna's adoptive father Carl Stacey had been killed in a work-related accident, her adoptive mother Fay Stacey was forced to place her for adoption again, unable to raise the toddler because of mounting expenses. However, Donna became victim to a child-selling racket, which ended with the racketeers' deaths in a furnace explosion and the fire. With Robin's help, Donna is reunited with Fay, who had married Hank Evans and given birth to two additional children, Cindy and Jerry. Donna marries Terry Long in Tales of the Teen Titans #50 (February 1985).

=== Post-Crisis ===
Crisis on Infinite Earths (1985–1986) rewrote the history of many DC Comics characters; Wonder Woman's own pre-Crisis history was written out of existence, and the character was reintroduced in Wonder Woman (vol. 2) #1 (February 1987) as a new arrival from Themyscira (formerly known as Paradise Island). With the character of Donna tied predominantly to the Titans, her origin was retconned to fit into the new continuity created by Wonder Woman's relaunch, one severing her direct ties to the Amazons. In the storyline "Who is Wonder Girl?" featured in The New Titans #50–54 (December 1988–March 1989), the Titans of Myth enlist Donna's aid against the murderous Sparta of Synriannaq. It is revealed that the Titan Rhea had rescued a young Donna from a fire; Donna and Sparta were one of 12 orphans who had been raised on New Cronus by the Titans as "Titan Seeds", their eventual saviors.

The Seeds had been given superhuman powers, and named after ancient Greek cities. Called "Troy", Donna (like the others) had eventually been stripped of her memories of her time with the Titans of Myth, and reintroduced into humankind to await her destiny; Sparta had retained her memories, and the knowledge had eventually driven her mad. Killing her fellow Seeds to "collect" their powers and destroy the Titans of Myth, Sparta is ultimately defeated by Donna and the only other Seed left alive, Athyns of Karakkan. In The New Titans #55 (June 1989), Donna changes her identity from Wonder Girl to Troia and adopts a new hairstyle and costume incorporating mystical gifts from the Titans of Myth.

=== Lord Chaos ===
During the "Titans Hunt" storyline, Donna discovers she is pregnant; in The New Titans Annual #7 (1991), a group calling themselves the Team Titans appears, intent on killing her. They come from a future in which Donna's son is born with the full powers of a god and full awareness of them, which drives him mad. He instantly ages himself, kills his mother, and becomes a dictator known as Lord Chaos. The Team Titans travel back to the past to kill Donna before her son can be born. Donna eventually gives birth to Robert; to prevent him from becoming Lord Chaos, she sacrifices her powers and becomes a normal human.

Eventually, Donna rethinks her decision and asks the Titans of Myth to grant her powers again; her request is rejected. She then joins the Darkstars. During the Zero Hour crisis, her farm in New Jersey is destroyed and all the Team Titans are wiped out of existence except for Terra and Mirage. Her marriage in ruins, Donna loses custody of her son to her now ex-husband Terry. Donna rejoins the New Titans for a time, with her Darkstar suit giving her the ability to aid them. She dates Kyle Rayner for a while and retires from the Darkstars, leaving her powerless. Donna and Kyle break up immediately following the death of her son, stepdaughter and ex-husband in a car accident.

=== Magical duplicate ===
Her post-Crisis origin was updated in the late 1990s. This version had it that she was originally created by the Amazon sorceress Magala as a magical duplicate of the young Princess Diana of Themyscira (a nod to the original Wonder Girl) to be a playmate for Diana, who was previously the only child on the island. However, Donna was soon kidnapped by the Dark Angel (a World War II villainess and sworn enemy of Queen Hippolyta, Diana's mother), who thought the girl was Diana.

Dark Angel cursed Donna to live endless variants of a life characterized by suffering, with her life being restarted and erased from the world's memory when Donna was at her lowest. Even Donna would forget her past lives until the moment at which Dark Angel would arrive to restart her life, at which point she would immediately recall all of her past suffering. With the help of Wonder Woman, Hippolyta, and the third Flash (her former Titans teammate, Wally West), the only people who remembered the previous version, Donna was restored. Somehow, she also regained her powers, presumably because that was how Wally remembered her. Initially, she was concerned that she was not the "same" Donna, but an idealized form based on Wally's memories. She has since accepted that this is not the case.

Shortly afterwards, the Titans gathered together to save their friend Cyborg. They came into conflict with the JLA, but they saved their friend. During this incident Donna was seemingly reunited with her son via virtual reality, but with the aid of Nightwing, realized it was not real. After that, the original five Teen Titans, including Troia, decided to reform the team. A subsequent battle with Dark Angel suggested her constant rewriting of Donna's history involved Hypertime. It is not clear how this ties in with later revelations.

Realizing that Donna was created from a portion of Diana's soul, Queen Hippolyta accepted Donna as a blood-related daughter and held a coronation on Themyscira to formally introduce Donna as the second princess of Paradise Island. This aspect brought Donna more in-line with her Pre-Crisis Themyscirian origins. After her coronation, Donna and Diana's bond as sisters grew stronger. The two Amazons shared a high end apartment in New York City and Donna became more active in life on Themyscira. While the Amazons of Bana-Mighdall saw Diana as an official moderator between the Themyscirian Amazons and themselves, Donna made strides in becoming an accepted member of both tribes in their eyes. While aiding the Amazons, Donna also came into contact with the villain Angle Man who immediately became enamored with her. After their awkward yet flirtatious first meeting, a seriously wounded Angle Man later teleported himself to Donna seeking her help after being attacked by The Cheetah.

In a separate battle, Donna was apparently killed by a rogue Superman robot in the Titans/Young Justice crossover "Graduation Day", but was later shown to be alive on another world. The Return of Donna Troy, a four-issue miniseries written by Phil Jimenez with art by José Luis García-López and George Pérez, expanded upon the resurrection of Donna Troy and cleared up her multiple origins.

=== DC Special: The Return of Donna Troy ===
Donna Troy has now discovered that like every other person after the Crisis on Infinite Earths, she is a merger of every alternate version of Donna Troy in the Multiverse. Unlike everyone else, Donna is the repository of knowledge of every alternate universe version of herself and remembers the original Multiverse. She learned that her counterpart on Earth-Two was saved by a firefighter and was raised in an orphanage, while her Earth-S counterpart died in the fire. She also discovered that her sworn enemy of the past, Dark Angel, was the Donna Troy of Earth-Seven, saved from certain death by the Anti-Monitor, just like the Monitor had saved Harbinger. When the Multiverse was reconfigured in one single Universe, Dark Angel, who had somehow escaped the compression of every Donna Troy into one single person in the new Earth, sought to kill her (every life she forced her to relive was an aspect of an alternate Donna as a way to avoid the merging and remain the last one standing). When she was defeated, Donna became the real sum of every Donna Troy that existed on every Earth, a living key to the lost Multiverse.

Her role in Infinite Crisis is, at the end of The Return of Donna Troy, fully stated: Donna had been reborn after her death at the hands of the Superman android. The Titans of Myth, realizing that she was the child who was destined to save them from some impending threat, brought her to New Cronus and implanted false memories within her mind to make her believe she was the original Goddess of the Moon and wife of Coeus. The Titans of Myth incited war between other worlds near New Cronus in order to gain new worshipers. They would then use the combined power of their collective faith to open a passageway into another reality, where they would be safe from destruction. Donna was another means to that end until she was found by the Titans and the Outsiders, who restored her true memories. This was not without casualties, however. Sparta (who was restored to full mental health and stripped of the bulk of her power) had been made an officer in the Titans of Myth's royal military. She was sacrificed by the Titans of Myth in an attempt to lay siege to the planet Minosyss, which housed a Sun-Eater factory miles beneath its surface. Sparta's death had inadvertently helped trigger Donna's memory restoration. Athyns had also reappeared by this time and aided the heroes and the Mynossian resistance in battling the Titans of Myth. It was then that Hyperion, the Titan of the Sun, revealed Donna's true origins to her and ordered her to open a passageway into another reality by means of a dimensional nexus that once served as a gateway to the Multiverse itself, within the Sun-Eater factory's core. This turned out to be the Titans of Myth's real target. Donna did so, but, fearing that they would simply continue with their power-mad ambitions, she banished most of them into Tartarus. However, Hyperion and his wife, Thia, were warned of the deception at the last moment. Enraged, they turned on Donna, intending to kill her for the betrayal, but Coeus activated the Sun-Eater to save her and Arsenal. As the Sun-Eater began absorbing their vast solar energies, Hyperion and Thia tried to escape through the Nexus, but they were both torn apart by the combined forces of the Nexus' dimensional pull and the Sun-Eater's power. Coeus, who had learned humility and compassion from Donna, vowed to guard the gateway to make certain the other Titans of Myth remained imprisoned forever.

=== Infinite Crisis and 52 ===
Donna returns to the now-barren New Cronus where she shares a joyful reunion with Wonder Woman. Donna, charged with the guardianship of the Universe Orb containing the Multiverse Chronicles collected by Harbinger, makes the startling discovery that an impending doom is facing the DC Universe, a doom she cannot avert alone. Leaving Nightwing behind on Earth, Donna brings several heroes to New Cronus, including Animal Man; Cyborg; Firestorm; Herald; Bumblebee; Red Tornado; Shift; Green Lanterns Alan Scott, Kyle Rayner, and Kilowog, Jade, Starfire, Supergirl, and Captain Marvel Jr. The heroes confront a mysterious and menacing rip in space caused by Alexander Luthor Jr. that has sparked an intergalactic war. Donna's team contributes to the resolution of the conflict, but things take a dangerous turn when Alexander uses the inter-dimensional tear to recreate Earth-Two and, later, the Multiverse. Donna, along with Kyle (now called Ion), leads the team to attack Alexander through his space rift, giving Nightwing, Superboy, and Wonder Girl the time needed to destroy Alexander's device, and save the two Supermen and Wonder Woman from being merged with their Earth-Three counterparts. Though most of the team vanishes when they attempt to leave via the portal opened by Mal Duncan and Adam Strange, she returns to Earth shortly after the Battle of Metropolis, and provides a Sun-Eater to the Green Lantern Corps in which to imprison Superboy-Prime at the end of the battle on Mogo.

In the series 52, Cyborg, Herald, Alan Scott, Bumblebee, Hawkgirl, and Firestorm were all returned to Earth although gravely injured, while other heroes such as Supergirl, Starfire, Animal Man, and Adam Strange were lost in space. In the History of the DC Universe backup feature, when Donna and the artificial intelligence in charge of Harbinger's historical records finished her task of reviewing the DC Universe's history, both the artificial intelligence and one of the new Monitors revealed to her that the current timeline has diverged from its rightful path, in which Donna herself, instead of Jade, should have sacrificed herself for Kyle.

During the World War III storyline, Donna goes into battle as Wonder Woman against a rampaging Black Adam.

=== "One Year Later" ===
During the "One Year Later" storyline event, Donna Troy has assumed the mantle of Wonder Woman after Diana stepped down following the Crisis, feeling the need to 'find out who Diana is'. Donna wears a set of armor during her tenure as Wonder Woman, which includes the bracelet and star-field material used as part of her Titans regalia. Donna's post-Infinite Crisis origin, which incorporates elements from her previous origins, is as follows: Donna was a magical twin of Diana created by the Amazon Magala and intended as a playmate for the lonely princess. Donna was later captured by Hippolyta's enemy—Dark Angel who mistook her for Diana and placed her in suspended animation for several years. Years later, the grown up Diana, now Wonder Woman, eventually freed Donna and returned her to Themyscira. Donna was then trained by both the Amazons and the Titans of Myth. A few years later, Donna followed Diana into Man's World and became Wonder Girl, wearing a costume based on Wonder Woman's and helped form the Teen Titans. In her last adventure as Wonder Woman, Donna battles Cheetah, Giganta, and Doctor Psycho. The trio attacks Donna as a means of finding the then-missing Diana. This eventually happens with the revelation that Circe is the mastermind behind the attacks and capture. After Donna is freed from Circe, she dons her old red Wonder Girl jumpsuit and aids her sister in battle telling Diana that she wants to give the Wonder Woman title back to her as she was never really comfortable using that name and would rather just be called Donna Troy.

Donna later works alongside ex-boyfriend Kyle Rayner, who has taken up the powers and title of Ion again. They go up against one of the Monitors who attempts to remove them from the newly rebuilt Multiverse, claiming the two are unwanted anomalies. Donna returns to Earth with Ion in time for him to say goodbye to his dying mother. After that event, Donna joins several former Teen Titans in the current team's battle against Deathstroke and his Titans East team.

=== Countdown to Final Crisis ===
Donna attends Duela Dent's funeral with the Teen Titans. She is confronted by Jason Todd, who seeks her out as a kindred spirit; the two cross paths while investigating Duela's murder. Donna places her investigation on hold when the Amazons invade Washington, D.C. during the events depicted in Amazons Attack! She travels to the city and confronts Hippolyta, advising her to end the invasion, but Hippolyta informs her that she will only consider a withdrawal if Donna will include Diana in their talks. Donna leaves to find her sister. Jason, who has followed Donna to Washington, tells her that the Monitors are responsible for Duela's death. Donna and Jason are attacked by the Monitor's warrior, Forerunner. They are saved by a benevolent Monitor, whom Jason calls Bob, and recruited to locate Ray Palmer. They soon learn that Palmer is hiding in the Multiverse.

The group is joined by Kyle Rayner; Jason and Kyle bicker during the journey and Donna is annoyed. Ray Palmer is located on Earth-51 and Bob attacks him, betraying the group. Donna and the others escape, and are caught in the crossfire when Monarch's forces attack Earth-51. Donna is attacked by an alternate version of herself wearing a Wonder Girl costume, and overcomes her doppelganger and escapes. She takes the doppelganger's costume, defeats one of Monarch's lieutenants, and is acclaimed leader of an insect army by right of conquest. She leads the force of Myrmidons into the battle against Monarch's forces. Superboy-Prime confronts Monarch, and the insect warriors are killed in the fallout.

Following the battle, Donna alone is able to discern a message directing the group to Apokolips, where the team are witness to its destruction as they first meet the other Countdown characters: Jimmy Olsen, Forager, Pied Piper, Mary Marvel, Holly Robinson, Harley Quinn, Karate Kid, and Una. Witnessing Apokolips near-destruction at the hands of Brother Eye, the team are later sent to a reconstituted Earth-51 by Solomon, now a world similar to New Earth with the absence of the now much-expanded Challengers team. It is here that Karate Kid dies, and his Morticoccus virus transforms humans into violent animal hybrids, losing Una to the feral natives and leaving Buddy Blank's grandson as the Last Boy on Earth. Returned to New Earth by Jimmy Olsen via a Boom Tube, Gothamites Harley, Holly, and Jason return home while Mary Marvel is once again corrupted by Darkseid who captures Jimmy, who holds the power of all the deceased New Gods. Freed from Darkseid's control by Atom's microscopic rewiring, Jimmy and Darkseid duke it out until Orion descends from the heavens (following his interrupted battle with the killer of the New Gods in Death of the New Gods), and slays his father. In the aftermath of these events, the remaining party of Donna, Kyle, Ray, and Forager announce to the Monitors they will serve as bodyguards for the New Multiverse, and depart to places unknown.

Returning to Earth after her adventures in the Multiverse with Kyle, Donna and other former and present Titans are targeted by a mysterious foe who is later revealed to be Trigon. The Titans reform to fend off Trigon's assault and avenge the incapacitated Titans East.

In Final Crisis #5, Donna Troy is turned into a Justifier. She, among other Justifiers, attacked the Switzerland Checkmate HQ. She tried to put the Justifier helmet onto Alan Scott before being knocked away by Hawkman.

=== Justice League ===
The build-up to Donna's recruitment begins when she volunteers to help Mikaal Tomas and Congorilla track down the supervillain Prometheus. She accompanies them to the JLA Watchtower alongside Starfire and Animal Man, only to discover that Red Arrow has been mutilated by Prometheus. During the ensuing battle, Donna is impaled through the wrists, but frees herself. Prometheus projects a hologram around her, causing Green Arrow to shoot her in the leg, which penetrates her skin and causes her to fall unconscious. She takes down Prometheus after he defeats the rest of the team, rips off his helmet, and starts beating him brutally, but Shade stops her. Unfortunately, the villain destroys Star City via a teleportation device.

During Blackest Night, Donna encounters her deceased son Robert and husband Terry, revived as undead beings by the Black Lantern Corps. She is bitten by Robert, becoming "infected" by the Black Lantern's power. Donna, along with Superboy, Kid Flash, Wonder Woman, Green Lantern (Hal Jordan) and several other resurrected heroes, began to be targeted by Nekron, the being responsible for the Black Lanterns. Donna's previous status as a deceased allowed for her to be transformed into a Black Lantern. However, unlike the other heroes, Donna was converted by being infected with the Black Lantern's power rather than having a ring forced on her. Donna is freed by the power of white light.

In the aftermath of this, Donna is told by Wonder Woman that she could benefit from being a part of the JLA. To that end, she officially joins the team, even recruiting Cyborg, Dick Grayson (now Batman), and Starfire as well. Donna remains with the League and battles such foes as Superwoman and Eclipso. Donna eventually resigns from the team after coming to peace with her inner turmoil, and Dick disbands the team shortly after.

=== The New 52 and DC Rebirth ===
In 2011, following the Flashpoint storyline, DC revised its continuity, relaunching with a suite of new #1 comics as part of an initiative called The New 52. Donna does not initially appear in this continuity at all; the Teen Titans are first established in the present day, with Cassie Sandsmark as Wonder Girl, and Wonder Woman's new origin presents her as the natural-born daughter of Zeus and Hippolyta.

Donna is reintroduced in the pages of Wonder Woman as an Amazon created by a sorcerer, Derinoe, as an attempt to usurp Diana's place as queen, replacing her with a new ruler. Diana defeats Donna and Donna sets about a period of soul-searching. Meanwhile, in the Titans Hunt storyline which seeks to retroactively reestablish the history of the Teen Titans in the New 52, Donna is shown as having been a Teen Titan, working alongside Titans co-founders such as Dick Grayson and Garth, until an encounter with the telepathic supervillain Mister Twister resulted in the Titans' memories being erased. In the Wonder Woman series, Donna struggles with her rage and anger and after being killed in a battle is chosen by Zeus to replace the Fates, making Donna a new embodiment of Fate. In the last issue of Titans Hunt, Donna confirms that she is "the Fate of the Gods", but does not reconcile her history depicted in Titans Hunt with her creation depicted in Wonder Woman.

Titans Hunt led into the DC Rebirth initiative, which brought back more popular elements of past continuity after former Titan Wally West returns to the DC Universe and reunites his friends. He explains to his fellow Titans how 10 years were stolen from their lives as a result of unknown forces, partially accounting for the discrepancies. Donna and her friends then reform the Titans. On touching Wally in Titans Rebirth #1, Donna has her childhood memories of Wally restored. Later, the Titans (vol. 2) Annual #1 (May 2017) reconciles the two accounts of Donna's history — recent magical creation or longtime ally of Wonder Woman — revealing that Donna was, as in the New 52 story, created out of clay to destroy Wonder Woman, but the Amazons later gave her false memories of being an orphan rescued by Wonder Woman. This allowed Donna to be more than a living weapon, and to establish a stable life. Though Donna was heartbroken by the revelation, she was supported by her Titans colleagues, who affirmed their friendship.

Donna remains a main character in the Titans series at DC after the team was broken up by the Justice League and reformed by Nightwing with supervision from the League this time. After Dick Grayson was shot in the head by KGBeast, Donna becomes leader of the team while he is recovering from his injury and amnesia.

In the Infinite Frontier era, Donna's original origin story is restored and her backstory is a close approximation of her complete publication history. In Titans Annual 2025, Donna receives a message from her biological father, and intends to meet him, only to discover he has recently died. She learns Lou was a gay man who impregnated her mother, Dorothy, while he was young and "deeply closeted", leading to his abandoning Dorothy, who died shortly after putting Donna up for adoption. After starting a new life for himself, Lou spent years trying to make contact with his estranged daughter before realising that she had become the famous superhero Wonder Girl, after which time he "followed her career religiously" but was afraid to make contact. Donna bonds with her father's husband Carlos and meets his firehouse colleagues. However, Carlos does not tell her about the existence of her biological half-sister, Zoe Rivera. The story's epilogue imagines that Donna's son Robert is being cared for by Lou and Dorothy in heaven.

== Origin retcons ==
Donna Troy is often noted for having had a number of complicated revisions to her origin. Writer Marv Wolfman recounted:

I wrote the original Donna Troy origin story back in the first Titans run. She had never had one and was, in fact, not a "real" character (if you can call any of them real). She was a computer simulation of Wonder Woman as a girl. That story also named her Donna Troy and set up everything that followed. Unfortunately, after Crisis on Infinite Earths and the Wonder Woman revamp, we had to go back and redo it again as a brand new Wonder Woman being born on Earth could not have rescued the girl from the burning building. I wish we had been able to keep it as I think it's gone insane now. I just wanted a simple origin story. I came up with the original, and then [in "Who is Donna Troy?"] George [Pérez] and I simply elaborated on what had been done, giving her real knowledge of who she was. I would love to say that everything after "Who is Donna Troy?" should be forgotten, but that's not the way continuity works, sadly.

Under John Byrne, Donna was retconned to be a mirror-image duplicate of Wonder Woman, created by the Amazon sorceress Magala using a spell to give life to Diana's reflections so that the young princess would have an age-appropriate friend. This duplicate is kidnapped by WWII Wonder Woman's nemesis, Dark Angel. Dark Angel forces Donna to undergo multiple "lives" that all end in tragedy and result in her resetting back to her beginning. Hippolyta and Wonder Woman attempt to rescue Donna, but Dark Angel destroys her rather than release her from her clutches. With help from Wally West, Donna is recreated as a golem, drawing from Wally's incomplete, Pollyanna-esque memories of her. Later, Dark Angel attempts to erase all memories of Donna from the various Hypertime realities, drawing Dark Angel into conflict with Donna, the Titans, and their alternate reality counterparts from the story Kingdom Come. During the battle, Donna is mindwiped and then reprogrammed with all of her old memories after she is made to relive her past lives.

After Donna Troy is killed by a fleet of Superman androids reprogrammed by Brainiac, she is resurrected by the Titans of Myth, who seek to exploit her status as an "anomaly" from the world that existed before Crisis on Infinite Earths to escape the coming cataclysm of Infinite Crisis. This story establishes Donna's status as an anomaly of the timeline, explaining that she survived the Crisis and was later subjected to multiple alternate origins as the universe tried to fit her into the new timeline created following the collapse of the Multiverse. This makes Donna in effect "a living key to the lost Multiverse". This same storyline also reveals that Dark Angel is an evil alternate universe version of Donna from Earth-Seven. Another pre-Crisis survivor, she "was saved by the Anti-Monitor, and raised to be his harbinger of doom, Dark Angel. But Dark Angel was uncontrollable, and vanished".

Within a short time after 2011's The New 52 reboot that followed the Flashpoint story, DC had already presented two conflicting new origins for Donna Troy in the pages of Wonder Woman and Titans Hunt. In the first case, she is introduced as a ruthless magical golem intended to usurp Wonder Woman's status as leader of the Amazons, before being defeated and going on a journey of discovery. In Titans Hunt, this same Donna, alongside other former Teen Titans, rediscovers partial memories of childhood heroism with the Teen Titans as Wonder Girl – which should be impossible for her. In the DC Rebirth relaunch, Donna regains her childhood after meeting Wally West, who remembers her. At the same time, Diana learns in the Wonder Woman storyline "The Lies" that her New 52 adventures were in large part an elaborate illusion intended to keep her away from the Amazons. A later Titans story attempted to reconcile the New 52 storylines by saying that Donna had been a magical golem created to destroy Wonder Woman who was given fake memories by the Amazons.

During DC's Infinite Frontier era, whose editorial mandate was "everything is canon", Donna Troy's original backstory – rescued orphan raised on Paradise Island as an Amazon – was re-established as her true origin after the timeline was "unknotted" by Wonder Woman. Titans Annual (2025) retells Donna's memories, which combines her pre- and post-Crisis publication histories: rescued from a fire by Diana; adopted by Hippolyta and raised on Paradise Island as an Amazon; given some of Diana's powers by the Purple Ray; becoming a Teen Titan; relationships with Roy, Garth, and Kyle; the battle with Mister Twister; time as Darkstar and Troia; a civilian career as a photographer; her short marriage to Terry; and the tragic death of their son, Robert.

== Powers and abilities ==
Donna's superhuman powers have changed several times over the years, but in all of her various incarnations, they have always consisted of considerable superhuman strength, endurance, speed, and the power of flight.

- In her pre-Crisis origin, Donna was granted those powers by the Amazon's Purple Ray, and these powers increased as she grew older. She also wielded a lasso of her own, but it apparently had no magical properties like Diana's Lasso of Truth, aside from being infinite in length and virtually indestructible.
- The first major redefinition of Donna's powers came about when she took the name of Troia. She still possessed all the abilities she had before, but now in addition to those, she could wield photonic energy as power blasts and protective force fields, and generate light from her hands. Donna has the ability to project three dimensional images of a person's memories, provided the subject is a willing participant in the process. Donna's Troia costume was made of various gifts given to her by the Titans of Myth, the most notable of which was the unique star field material that showed the exact location of New Chronus.
- After Donna petitioned the Titans of Myth to depower her, she became Darkstar, gaining the standard exomantle all members wore, granting her superhuman strength, speed, and agility. The exomantle also possessed a personal force field for protection against physical impact and energy attacks. The main weapons were twin laser units that fired energy blasts with pinpoint accuracy; however, it seems that Donna did not undergo the surgical procedure to attain the instant mastery of maser control that the other Darkstars had, and had a split-second delay in reaction time when wearing the less powerful deputy version of the exo-mantle. A powerful shoulder mounted cannon complemented the maser system of the Darkstars' exo-mantle. With the exo-mantle, one could achieve high speeds during flight, all the while protected from wind friction by the force field.
- After her post-Crisis origin was created, Donna regained the powers she had lost at the Titans of Myth's behest, but now they were virtually identical to Diana's. Donna and Diana also share a psychic rapport which allows one to feel either what the other is experiencing or even share dreams. Shortly after her resurrection as the Goddess of the Moon, during the Return of Donna Troy limited series, Donna's powers were enhanced and upgraded. She retained all of the abilities she had before, and regained her energy manipulation abilities (which, being cosmic-based, were far more powerful). She also commanded darkness and cold to great effect. Donna has not been shown using those powers since regaining her memories. Over the years, Donna has grown extremely powerful, with power and strength, almost rivaling her big sister, Diana (Wonder Woman). Superman even admitted in the "Batman Who Laughs" story arc during a fight with Donna Troy that she is now just as powerful as Wonder Woman. She is considered to be one of the strongest superheroines of the DC Universe along with Power Girl, Supergirl, Big Barda, Mary Marvel, Isis, and Wonder Woman.
- Like all Amazons, Donna is exceptionally well trained in the use of various weapons and in various martial arts. Her sister Diana, mother Hippolyta, General Phillipus, and Artemis seem to be her only rivals as a warrior (among the Amazons). She is also a very capable leader and strategist.
- Pre-Flashpoint, Donna wielded a new lasso of her own called the Lasso of Persuasion. It glows blue, and like Wonder Woman's lasso is quite durable. It also has the ability to force anyone within its confines to do Donna's bidding if her willpower is greater than theirs.
- Donna has the ability to flawlessly imitate the voice of anyone she has heard.
- Post-DC Rebirth, Donna Troy also retains her vast superhuman strength, speed, durability, stamina, senses, reflexes, agility, flight, and immortality. However it was revealed by her evil future version, Troia, that Donna can feed on more power if she kills.

Donna also retains her magical abilities to control darkness, the cold, and the essence of night itself. However, it is heavily implied Donna has a lot of magical potential to due being the child of magic, Amazon witches, and possibly goddesses that are tied to night and magic like Hekate, Selene, and Nyx.

Donna also wields a magical sword and sometimes a shield. She carries the Lasso of Persuasion gifted to her by the gods. It glows blue and can force anyone bound by it to obey every command of the wielder. It is field by the essence of willpower and as long as Donna's willpower overpowers the person bound by her lasso the person is forced to submit and obey. However the person is under control by Donna's will even after they are not bound by the lasso anymore. Only until they obey will they be released mentally from the lasso's power. The lasso can also teleport to New Chronus. The lasso is also unbreakable and go as long as what the wielder wants it be.

Donna also wears Amazon gauntlets that deflect any offensive attack.

== Other versions ==
=== Earth 2 ===
An alternate universe version of Donna Troy from Earth-Two appears in The New 52. This version is the daughter of Wonder Woman and Steppenwolf and is also known as Fury.

=== Earth 3 ===
An alternate universe version of Donna Troy from Earth-Three appears in Infinite Frontier. This version is the biological daughter of Hippolyta and a member of the Crime Syndicate who is also known as Superwoman.

=== DC Bombshells ===
An alternate universe version of Donna Troy from Earth-24 appears in DC Comics Bombshells. This version is a Japanese-American human and member of the Wonder Girls who wields Wonder Woman's weaponry following her death.

== Reception ==
IGN placed Donna Troy as the 93rd greatest comic book hero of all time, stating that even though she might have the most unnecessarily complex backstory of all comics characters, Donna has served a major purpose in the DC universe since her inception.

== Collected editions ==
Title	Material collected	Publication date	ISBN
New Teen Titans: Who is Donna Troy?	New Teen Titans vol 1 #38; New Titans vol 1 #50–55; Tales of the Teen Titans #50; Teen Titans/Outsiders Secret Files and Origins 2003 vol 1 #1	July 2005	978-1401207243
DC Special: The Return of Donna Troy	The Return of Donna Troy #1–4	August 2005	978-1401209315
Teen Titans Outsiders: The Death and Return Of Donna Troy	Titans/Young Justice: Graduation Day #1-3, DC Special: The Return of Donna Troy #1-4	February 2006	9781845762483

== In other media ==
=== Television ===
Conor Leslie as Donna Troy / Wonder Girl in Titans

- Donna Troy as Wonder Girl appears in the "Teen Titans" segment of The Superman/Aquaman Hour of Adventure, voiced by Julie Bennett.
- Donna Troy as Wonder Girl appears in Hanna-Barbera's "New Teen Titans Say No to Drugs" public service announcement.
- An unnamed girl resembling Donna Troy makes cameo appearances in Teen Titans.
- Donna Troy as Wonder Girl appears in the "Super Best Friends Forever" segment of DC Nation Shorts, voiced by Grey DeLisle. Additionally, she appears in the "New Teen Titans" short "Kids Korner 4 Kids" as a member of the Teen Titans.
- Donna Troy as Troia appears in Young Justice, voiced again by Grey DeLisle. This version is an ambassador for Themyscira at the United Nations.
- Donna Troy as Wonder Girl appears in the Teen Titans Go! (2013) episode "The Bergerac", voiced by Hynden Walch.
- Donna Troy as Wonder Girl appears in Titans, portrayed by Conor Leslie. This version is half-Amazon.

=== Film ===
- Donna Troy as Wonder Girl makes a non-speaking cameo appearance in Justice League: The New Frontier as a member of the Teen Titans.
- Donna Troy as Wonder Girl makes a non-speaking cameo appearance in Teen Titans: The Judas Contract as a member of the Teen Titans.
- Donna Troy as Wonder Girl makes a non-speaking cameo appearance in Teen Titans Go! To the Movies.
- Donna Troy as Wonder Girl makes a non-speaking cameo appearance in Justice League Dark: Apokolips War.

=== Video games ===
- Donna Troy appears in DC Universe Online, voiced by Deena Hyatt.
- Donna Troy as Wonder Girl and Troia appears as an unlockable playable character in Lego DC Super-Villains, voiced by Julie Nathanson.

=== Miscellaneous ===
Donna Troy as Wonder Girl appears in Teen Titans Go! (2004) #36 as a member of the Teen Titans.
