= Wonder Girl =

Alias of multiple DC Comics superheroines

- Characters who have associated with the name "Wonder Girl": Wonder Woman at the center, and continuing clockwise to left are Donna Troy, Cassandra Sandsmark, and Yara Flor on the cover to Wonder Woman (vol. 6) #17 (December 2024). Art by David Nakayama.
- Publisher: DC Comics
- First appearance: Princess Diana: Wonder Woman #105 (April 1959) (Note: A seven-year-old Princess Diana appears in Wonder Woman #23 (May/June 1947), but is not referred to as "Wonder Girl".); Donna Troy: The Brave and the Bold #60 (June/July 1965); Cassandra Sandsmark: Wonder Woman (vol. 2) #105 (January 1996); Yara Flor: Dark Nights: Death Metal #7 (January 2021)
- Created by: Robert Kanigher
- Characters: Diana Prince; Donna Troy; Cassandra Sandsmark; Yara Flor

Wonder Girl
- : Wonder Girl #1 (November 2007); Featuring the Cassie Sandsmark version of the character. Art by Sanford Greene and Nathan Massengill.

Series publication information
- Publisher: DC Comics
- Schedule: Monthly
- Format: Limited series
- Genre: Superhero
- Publication date: November 2007 – April 2008
- Number of issues: 6
- Main character(s): Donna Troy & Cassandra Sandsmark

Wonder Girl is the alias of multiple superheroines featured in American comic books published by DC Comics. They are associated with the superheroine Wonder Woman and possess Amazonian powers.

The Wonder Girl alias was first used for a teenage version of Wonder Woman in Wonder Woman #105 (April 1959). An original Wonder Girl, later named Donna Troy, debuted in The Brave and the Bold #60 (June/July 1965) and is a founding member of the Teen Titans. Cassie Sandsmark, the next Wonder Girl and a member of Young Justice and the Teen Titans, made her debut in Wonder Woman (vol. 2) #105 (January 1996). Future Wonder Woman Yara Flor, who debuted in Dark Nights: Death Metal #7 (January 2021), is the most recent Wonder Girl.

An original version of Wonder Girl named Drusilla appeared in the Wonder Woman television series, played by Debra Winger. Donna Troy made her live adaptation debut in the DC Universe/HBO Max series Titans, played by Conor Leslie.

== Fictional character biographies ==
=== Diana ===
A seven-year-old Princess Diana of the Amazons first appeared in a backstory in Wonder Woman #23 (May/June 1947), written by William Moulton Marston and designed by H.G. Peter. A teen-aged Diana, dubbed Wonder Girl, subsequently appeared in "The Secret Origin of Wonder Woman", written and edited by Robert Kanigher, in Wonder Woman #105 (April 1959). In this revised Silver Age origin, it is established that Diana had in fact not been created from clay, but had been born before the Amazons settled on Paradise Island. In issue #107 (July 1959), the story "Wonder Woman Amazon Teen-Ager!" illustrates how Wonder Girl wins her costume. Several Wonder Girl adventures followed, and years later an additional character, Wonder Tot—Wonder Woman as a toddler—was also featured. Kanigher restored the character's made-from-clay origin in 1966.

From Wonder Woman #124 (August 1961) onward, Wonder Woman, Wonder Girl, and Wonder Tot frequently appeared together in stories that were labeled "impossible tales", presented as films made by Wonder Woman's mother, Queen Hippolyta, who had the power to splice together films of herself and Diana at different ages. The characters of Wonder Girl and Wonder Woman then began to diverge, as Bob Haney wrote Wonder Girl stories that took place in the same time period as those of Wonder Woman.

The last significant appearance of Wonder Woman as a child Wonder Girl was in November 1965. In the tongue-in-cheek Wonder Woman #158, Kanigher broke the fourth wall by having Wonder Girl and the rest of the supporting cast he had created (Wonder Tot, the Glop, Bird-Boy, Mer-Boy, Birdman, and Manno) come to the office of a "certain" editor. Protested by fans for ruining the character, Kanigher tells Wonder Girl that he does love her, along with all of his other daughters, such as Black Canary, Star Sapphire, and Harlequin. With mounting pressure, Kanigher has no choice but to declare her retconned. Wonder Girl stoically accepts her fate as she and the others turn into drawings on Kanigher's desk. Soon after, Wonder Woman enters and is shocked to see her younger self "killed".

Regardless, Diana as a child Wonder Girl was never completely rejected. Reprints of Wonder Girl stories were occasionally included in the comic book. In issue #200, Wonder Woman, in her Diana Prince identity, is shown walking past children at play whereon she flashes back to when she was a fourteen-year-old Wonder Girl with a crush on Mer-Boy.

=== Donna Troy ===
While the characters of Wonder Girl and Wonder Woman were diverging, Haney was developing a new group of junior superheroes, whose first informal appearance featured a team-up of Robin (Dick Grayson), Kid Flash (Wally West), and Aqualad (Garth). During their next appearance in The Brave and the Bold #60 (July 1965), they were dubbed the Teen Titans and joined by Wonder Girl, pictured in the same frame as Wonder Woman and calling Hippolyta "mother".

Wonder Girl and the other Teen Titans were then featured in Showcase #59 (December 1965) before being spun off into their own series with Teen Titans #1 (February 1966). With the character called only Wonder Girl, or "Wonder Chick" by her teammates, her status as either the younger Wonder Woman displaced in the timeline or another character altogether is not explained until Teen Titans #22 (August 1969). In a story by Marv Wolfman and Gil Kane, it is established that Wonder Girl is a non-Amazon orphan, rescued by Wonder Woman from an apartment building fire. Unable to find any parents or family, Wonder Woman brings the child to Paradise Island, where she is eventually given Amazon powers by the Purple Ray. The story ends with Wonder Girl wearing a new costume and hairstyle, adopting the secret identity Donna Troy.

==== Multiple origins ====
As special event comics like Crisis on Infinite Earths and Infinite Crisis have rewritten character histories, the origin of Donna Troy has been revised several times. In brief, those origins are as follows:

1. Rescued orphan: Donna Troy was rescued from an apartment building fire by Wonder Woman, who took her to Paradise Island to be raised as an Amazon by Hippolyta.
2. Titan Seed: The Titan Rhea had rescued a young Donna from a fire, adding her to a group of 12 orphans from around the universe who had been raised on New Cronus by these Titans as "Titan Seeds", their eventual saviors. The Seeds had been given superhuman powers and named after ancient Greek cities. Called "Troy", Donna (like the others) was stripped of her memories from her time with the Titans of Myth, and reintroduced into humankind to await her destiny. In this version, Donna was not an Amazon and had no connection to Wonder Woman.
3. Infinite Lives of Donna Troy: In a revision that incorporated the Titan Seed continuity while reattaching Donna Troy to Wonder Woman, it is revealed that the Amazon sorceress Magala had animated a mirror image of young Princess Diana to create for her a mystical, "identical twin" playmate. This twin is soon mistaken for Diana and kidnapped by Dark Angel (the Donna Troy of Earth 7). Dark Angel disperses the girl's spirit across the multiverse, condemning her to live multiple lives, each one cut short by the Dark Angel at a moment of tragedy. In at least one of these variant lives, Donna would become a superhero and encounter her grown sister, now Wonder Woman, and their mother Hippolyta, without realizing who she really was or how she was related to them. After that timeline ends with the death of Donna's son, Diana and Hippolyta intervene to find what happened to Donna. Donna finally defeats Dark Angel, destroying the evil entity and regaining her original Amazon powers. She returns to reality to continue her life from that point.
4. Pre-Flashpoint version: Wonder Woman (vol. 3) Annual #1 gives Donna a new origin that combines elements of her three variant origins. Donna was born as Princess Diana's mystic twin through the help of Amazon sorceress Magala. Months later, an old enemy of Hippolyta, called Dark Angel, kidnapped Donna thinking she was Diana. Donna was placed in suspended animation by Dark Angel for years but was eventually rescued and returned to the Amazons' home, where she received training from both the Amazons and the Titans of Myth and was raised as Hippolyta's second daughter. Years later, she followed Wonder Woman into the outside world as Wonder Girl and helped form the Teen Titans.
5. New 52/Rebirth: Donna was created out of clay as part of a plan to destroy Wonder Woman. The Amazons later gave her false memories of being an orphan rescued by Wonder Woman allowing her to live a normal life.
6. Infinite Frontier: Following the Multiversal upheaval of Dark Knights: Metal, Donna's original backstory of a rescued orphan raised on Paradise Island was restored to canon.

=== Cassandra Sandsmark ===
Cassie Sandsmark is the granddaughter of Zeus. She has been a member of both Young Justice and the Teen Titans. Initially, her powers were derived from ancient Greek magical artifacts. Later, Zeus granted her the boon of actual powers. Her powers are similar to Wonder Woman's, though she carries a lasso that expels Zeus's lightning, which was given to her by her father, Ares, the Greek god of war. When the Greek gods left the mortal plane during Infinite Crisis, Zeus stripped Cassie of her powers. However, she was granted powers by Ares in exchange for becoming his champion.

After Superboy's death, she quit the Titans for a time to be an independent vigilante. She was mourning the loss of her lover, Superboy, and bitter from the abandonment by Robin and Wonder Woman over the following year. She later rejoined the group after a battle with the Brotherhood of Evil and the return of Cyborg. She is close friends with fellow hero Supergirl. She later didn't need anyone to empower her as she grew stronger herself.

=== Yara Flor ===
Yara Flor is the daughter of an Amazon and a Brazilian river god, who becomes the defender of the Esquecida Amazon tribe. The character debuted in January 2021 as part of DC Comic's "Future State" storyline, in which she is shown to be the Wonder Woman of the future. In the present day DC Comics narrative, Yara is introduced as part of the Infinite Frontier publishing event. She is unaware of her Amazon heritage, but, responding to a prophecy, the Olympian Gods and the Amazons of Themiscyra, Bana-Mighdall, and a third tribe in the Amazon rainforest separately begin to converge on her location as she makes a trip from the US to Brazil, the country of her birth. Hippolyta sends Wonder Girl Cassie Sandsmark to protect Yara, where she encounters Artemis of Bana-Mighdall.

As an Amazon-Guarani demigoddess, Yara inherits abilities the average Amazon does not. Yara has superhuman strength, speed, reflexes, durability, agility and senses. Yara also has the ability of hydrokinesis (manipulating water), which she discovers after she gets her golden bolas. Yara also rides a white winged horse from Olympus named Jerry.

According to the character's creator, Joëlle Jones, Yara's appearance was inspired by Brazilian model Suyane Moreira.

== Collected editions ==
Title	Material collected	Pages	Publication date	ISBN
Volume 1
Teen Titans Spotlight: Wonder Girl	Wonder Girl (vol. 1) #1–6.	144	July 9, 2008	978-1401218300
Volume 2
Wonder Girl: Adventures of a Teen Titan	Wonder Girl (vol. 2) #1, Adventure Comics (vol. 1) #461, GirlFrenzy! Wonder Woman: Donna Troy #1, Teen Titans (vol. 1) #22, The Brave and the Bold (vol. 1) #60, Wonder Woman (vol. 1) #105, and Wonder Woman (vol. 2) #105, 113.	160	August 30, 2017	978-1401271657
Volume 3
Wonder Girl: Homecoming	Wonder Girl (vol. 3) #1–7, Wonder Girl 2022 Annual #1, and Future State: Wonder Woman #1–2.	272	November 8, 2022	978-1779516664

== Alternate versions ==
=== Tiny Titans ===
Both Donna and Cassie have a recurring roles in the Tiny Titans comic by Art Baltazar and Franco Aureliani. The two are depicted as cousins, with the Wonder Girl alias given to Donna and Cassie being referred to by her first name.

=== Superman & Batman: Generations ===
In Superman & Batman: Generations, Wonder Girl first appears in 1953 as a "mystic projection" to take Wonder Woman's place while Diana gives birth. She finds a wounded Steve Trevor and takes him back to Paradise Island, but despite being subjected to the Purple Power Ray, he dies of his wounds, leaving Diana to raise their daughter, Stephanie, alone.

In 1964, Stephanie (or "Stevie") decides to go out on her own as Wonder Girl. She shares a link with Supergirl (Kara Kent), as they were born at the same time. Years later, she becomes the new Wonder Woman. Her outfit is pretty much the same as her mother's, except that she does not possess either the tiara or the Magic Lasso of Aphrodite, instead possessing the winged sandals of Hermes. She also wears a mask. When she becomes the new Wonder Woman, she adds a cape to the ensemble. In Superman & Batman: Generations, she is killed by Darkseid.

=== DC Comics Bombshells ===
In the DC Comics Bombshells universe, Wonder Girl is not a single person, but rather a team of young Asian-American girls who are empowered by the mystical artifacts formerly used by Wonder Woman. The Wonder Girls consist of Donna Troy (a Nisei Japanese-American), Cassie Sandsmark (a mixed-race girl of partial Japanese heritage), Yuki and Yuri Katsura, and Emily Sung.

=== Marvel Vs. DC ===
In the Amalgam Universe, Princess Ororo of Themyscira stands as an alternative version of Wonder Girl, creates by Ron Marz, Claudio Castellini, and Dan Jurgens. The character combining the powers and personas of Marvel's Storm and DC's Wonder Woman. She first appeared in Marvel vs. DC #3 (1996) on Earth-9602, and her character was a powerful synthesis of the two heroines.

== In other media ==
=== Television ===
==== Animation ====
- The Donna Troy incarnation of Wonder Girl appears in the "Teen Titans" segment of The Superman/Aquaman Hour of Adventure, voiced by Julie Bennett.
- The Donna Troy incarnation of Wonder Girl appears in the "New Teen Titans Say No to Drugs" public service announcement, produced by Hanna-Barbera.
- An unnamed girl resembling Donna Troy makes non-speaking appearances in the fifth season of Teen Titans.
- The Donna Troy incarnation of Wonder Girl appears in DC Nation Shorts, voiced by Grey DeLisle.
- The Cassie Sandsmark incarnation of Wonder Girl and Donna Troy / Troia appear in Young Justice, voiced by Mae Whitman and again by Grey DeLisle respectively.
- The Donna Troy incarnation of Wonder Girl appears in the Teen Titans Go! (2013) episode "The Bergerac", voiced by Hynden Walch.

==== Live-action ====
Debra Winger as Wonder Girl as she appears in Wonder Woman

- An original incarnation of Wonder Girl named Drusilla appears in Wonder Woman, portrayed by Debra Winger. This version is an Amazon and younger sister of Wonder Woman. In the two-part episode "The Feminum Mystique", Hippolyta sends her to bring Wonder Woman back to Paradise Island to resume her duties as princess, but Drusilla inadvertently becomes involved in a Nazi plot to discover the secret of Wonder Woman's magical bracelets and her transformation capability. Drusilla adopts the alias of Wonder Girl to combat them, but Nazi forces believe her to be Wonder Woman and capture her. Nonetheless, Drusilla breaks free and joins forces with Wonder Woman to foil the Nazis. In the episode "Wonder Woman in Hollywood", Drusilla joins forces with Wonder Woman to stop the Nazis from kidnapping American soldiers and forcing them to take part in a Nazi propaganda film. Following her appearances, a Wonder Girl spin-off series was put into development until Winger broke her contract and left the main series.
- The Donna Troy incarnation of Wonder Girl appears in Titans, portrayed by Conor Leslie.
- The CW, Greg Berlanti, and Dailyn Rodriguez intended to develop a Wonder Girl TV series focusing on Yara Flor, but The CW later decided not to move forward with the series as of February 2021.

=== Film ===
- The Donna Troy incarnation of Wonder Girl makes a non-speaking cameo appearance in the epilogue of Justice League: The New Frontier.
- An evil, alternate universe incarnation of Wonder Girl named Olympia appears in Justice League: Crisis on Two Earths as a minor member of the Crime Syndicate.
- Cassie Sandsmark makes a non-speaking cameo appearance in Justice League: Throne of Atlantis.
- The Young Justice incarnation of Cassie Sandsmark makes a non-speaking cameo appearance in Scooby-Doo! WrestleMania Mystery.
- The Donna Troy incarnation of Wonder Girl makes a non-speaking cameo appearance in the ending of Teen Titans: The Judas Contract.
- The Donna Troy incarnation of Wonder Girl makes a non-speaking cameo appearance in Teen Titans Go! To the Movies.
- The Donna Troy incarnation of Wonder Girl makes a non-speaking cameo appearance in Justice League Dark: Apokolips War.
- The Cassie Sandsmark incarnation of Wonder Girl appears in Batman and Superman: Battle of the Super Sons, voiced by Myrna Velasco.

=== Video games ===
- The Donna Troy incarnation of Wonder Girl appears in DC Universe Online, voiced by Deena Hyatt.
- The Cassie Sandsmark incarnation of Wonder Girl appears in Young Justice: Legacy, voiced again by Mae Whitman.
- The Cassie Sandsmark incarnation of Wonder Girl appears in Lego Batman 3: Beyond Gotham, voiced by Kari Wahlgren.
- The Cassie Sandsmark incarnation of Wonder Girl makes a cameo appearance in Cyborg's ending in Injustice 2.
- The Cassie Sandsmark incarnation of Wonder Girl appears as a playable character in DC Legends.
- Donna Troy and Cassie Sandsmark both appear as playable characters in Lego DC Super-Villains.

=== Miscellaneous ===
- The Donna Troy incarnation of Wonder Girl and Cassie Sandsmark appear in Teen Titans Go! (2004).
- The Cassie Sandsmark incarnation of Wonder Girl appears in the Injustice: Gods Among Us and Injustice 2 prequel comics.
