= Monitors (DC Comics) =

Fictional race by DC Comics

- Five of the Monitors; Art by Ariel Olivetti

Publication information
- Publisher: DC Comics
- First appearance: DCU: Brave New World (August 2006)
- Created by: Marv Wolfman; George Pérez

Characteristics
- Inherent abilities: Not well-defined, but if comparable to the original Monitor and the Anti-Monitor; vast cosmic powers Energy and matter manipulation Incalculable strength and durability Reality warping

The Monitors are a group of fictional comic book characters, who appear in books published by DC Comics.

They are based on the Monitor and the Anti-Monitor, two characters created by comic book writer Marv Wolfman and comic artist George Pérez as the main characters of DC Comics' Crisis on Infinite Earths limited series. They are a group that watches all aspects of the multiverse, past and present. Most importantly, they seek to prevent crossovers between the universes, as was common before "The Crisis". The Monitors first appeared in Brave New World.

They are in some respects similar to the Watchers of the Marvel Universe, though they take a more active role as opposed to simply observing.

== Fictional history ==
=== Origins ===
One of the Monitors appears in shadow on the cover of the DCU: Brave New World Special; the first few pages show the Monitors' satellite appearing over New Earth. In the final pages of the comic, five Monitors are revealed, one of whom calls the group "the Monitors." One of the five is noticeably different from the others; although his back is turned, he resembles the Anti-Monitor. This Monitor is later shown in Supergirl to only dress like the Anti-Monitor. In Ion #9, the Monitors are shown to be a society of many different Monitors. There are 52 in total, one from each of the new universes. In Countdown to Final Crisis #48, when a large group of Monitors gather together, it is shown that each of them is physically different from the others in at least a small way. The most extreme example, apart from the one dressed like the Anti-Monitor, is one who appears to be a humanoid giraffe, suggesting he is the Monitor of a modern equivalent of Captain Carrot's Earth-26.

When the tower that Alexander Luthor Jr. used to recreate the original multiverse during the events of Infinite Crisis was destroyed, a "seed programming" was activated that created a Monitor for each of the 52 Earths of the new multiverse born in that moment. Since this new multiverse consisted of 52 identical Earths at the time of its forming, all 52 Monitors would have been identical. However, following the events of 52, the Monitors began to evolve and acquire increasingly divergent identities in physicality and disposition. As the Monitors evolved, their story became more complex, a "self-assembling hyper story".

In the end, the revised origin of the Monitors took this form: in the beginning, a gigantic vast intelligence named Monitor, but referred to in places as "Overmonitor" or "Overvoid", discovered the Bleed and the multiverse within, a 'flaw' at its heart. Disturbed, it sent out a probe in a similar form to that of the original "Monitor" from Crisis on Infinite Earths that fed back the chaos of every story of the Infinite Earths all at once; overwhelmed by the very idea of a "story", the Monitor recalled the probe and sealed off the Bleed by creating the Multiverse Machine (or "Orrery of Worlds"), but his contemplation of the workings of the Machine created the World of Nil, populated by powerful vampiric beings with a vast and epic history, living and continuously evolving manifestations of the Monitor's thoughts, who see themselves as "descendants" of the Monitor himself. In their world, time moves - from a human point of view - much faster, so much so that the period between the original Crisis and the Final Crisis encompasses the rise and eventual fall of a vast and complex civilization.

In later interviews, the author of this revised origin of the Monitor race, Grant Morrison, explained it as a metafictional comment on the multiverse as both a living being and a fictional creation, with the Overvoid as a single or multiple pieces of blank white paper, reacting to the ink stories being forced upon it:

What happens if the page is a bit pissed off at the story that's drawn on it? So I thought of the page as God. The idea being that the Overvoid – as we called it in Final Crisis - of the white page as a space is sort of God. And it's condensing stories out of itself because it finds inside its own gigantic white space, self-absorbed pristine consciousness, it finds this little stain or mark, this DC Multiverse somebody has 'drawn'. And it starts investigating, and it's just shocked with what it sees, with all the crazy activity and signifying going on in there. It then tries to protect itself from the seething contact with 'story' and imagines a race of beings, 'angels' or 'monitors' (another word for angel, of course) to function as an interface between its own giant eternal magnificence and this tiny, weird crawling anthill of life and significance that is the DC Multiverse.
— Grant Morrison, Interviewed on IGN.

=== Individuality ===
In Countdown to Final Crisis, one of the storylines follows the Monitors in their headquarters. One Monitor has taken it upon himself to eradicate inconsistencies within the universes, characters such as Duela Dent, whom he kills. At first, the other 51 Monitors are devoted to watching the multiverse and intervening only when necessary. Throughout Countdown, each of the Monitors begins to develop disparate personalities and physical characteristics which reflect the nature of their universe, and each Monitor takes a name for themselves. In Final Crisis, one Monitor reflects that this is because interaction with the worlds of the multiverse has allowed time itself—beginnings and endings—to enter their haven. Rox Ogama, disciple of the Dark Monitor Mandrakk, is charged to look after the universe of Batman & Dracula: Red Rain, in which Batman also becomes a vampire.

==== "Bob" ====
The Monitors begin to debate over being reactive and proactive regarding the world jumpers and death cheaters. The proactive Monitor (in favor of killing the anomalies), manages to sway sentiment towards his side. He dispatches a Forerunner, a member of an experimental race of warriors bred by the Monitors, to kill Jason Todd and Donna Troy. They are stopped by one of the reactive Monitors only because the Forerunners must obey a Monitor due to their genetic breeding. The reactive Monitor, Jason, and Donna Troy meet with Ryan Choi to search for Ray Palmer. Here, Donna Troy realizes that, while this Monitor has done so much for the multiverse already, no one knows his name. The Monitor claims to not have a name, and Jason Todd takes it upon himself to name him "Bob." When the Challengers find Ray Palmer, Bob reveals his acts of assistance to be a ruse, and attempts to kill Palmer. After Palmer and the Challengers escape, Bob is confronted by his fellow Monitors. Solomon attempts to absorb Bob into his being, but ends up killing him instead.

==== Solomon ====
Solomon is the Monitor of Earth 8. As a result of Bob's actions, the other Monitors take a more aggressive approach to maintaining the multiverse. Seeing it as a necessity under the circumstances, they all take on names as Bob has. Rallying behind the Monitor of Earth-8, now calling himself Solomon, they begin to fear that it is not only the anomalies that they must face, but also the virus infecting Karate Kid, Monarch's growing army, whoever is responsible for Jimmy Olsen's powers, and the possibility that a single individual may be behind all of these events. With the help of a female monitor, Solomon convinces the others to prepare for war. After Solomon's attempt to absorb Bob, the other Monitors voice their disapproval. Solomon reveals that he planned to join with his fellow Monitors and become the Source. The Monitors are then interrupted by Monarch. As the Monitors battle his army, Monarch reveals to Solomon that his actions were the catalyst to the creation of his army. Solomon, greatly distressed, flees to the Monitor satellite, where he is snubbed by the remaining Monitors. Solomon is then approached by Superman-Prime. Solomon tells Prime that Monarch is destroying the perfect universe, and Prime flies off to fight him. Darkseid then appears and offers Solomon assistance. They go to Apokolips, where they watch events unfold. While the planet is assimilated by Brother Eye, and a large part of it is destroyed by Pied Piper, Darkseid reveals that it was Solomon who attacked Captain Atom in Blüdhaven, triggering his transformation into Monarch. When Darkseid reveals his plans to control the Fifth World, Solomon appears to the heroes still on Apokolips, warning them of the danger, and teleporting them back to Earth. It is later revealed that the Earth he sent them to was the reconstituted Earth-51, as a way of stopping part of Darkseid's plan. Solomon is seen on the Monitors' satellite, patiently awaiting Darkseid's next move. After Darkseid's death, Solomon creates a small monument to him on the Source Wall, and patiently begins planning anew.

==== Nix Uotan ====
Monitor of Earth-51, Nix Uotan is the "youngest" of all the Monitors. He is first seen at the beginning of Countdown to Final Crisis, a nameless Monitor with only minimal distinguishing features, seeking guidance at the Source Wall regarding the rising tensions in the multiverse. Being informed by the Source that the Great Disaster—a long-foretold event that would herald the end of the Monitor race—is approaching and that only Ray Palmer can stop it, he determines to keep Palmer's presence on his world a secret from his brethren. He is next seen on Earth-12, where he confronts Bob in an attempt to stop his efforts to find Ray Palmer, who is "living a life of no consequence" in the relative safety of his own assigned world. When the Challengers (Donna, Jason, and Kyle) are brought to Earth-51, at last finding Ray Palmer there, Bob and Solomon bring the Monitors to this Earth in hopes of destroying Palmer. The Monarch uses this opportunity to put his Multiversal army at war against the Monitors, a war that ultimately lays nuclear waste to all of Earth-51. Nix Uotan sends the Challengers to Apokolips to confront Darkseid; he is left alone in his desolate universe, and begins its rebirth. After events on Apokolips, the Challengers are sent to the reborn Earth-51 by Solomon, infecting it with Karate Kid's Morticoccus virus and causing the Great Disaster. In the final issue of Countdown to Final Crisis, the Challengers (now Donna, Kyle, Ray, and Forager) confront the Monitors with the promise they will be watching them and protecting the multiverse; Nix Uotan defends their choice, and joins their ranks in a reconstituted group of Challengers.

At the start of Final Crisis, Nix Uotan is punished for failing to protect Earth-51 from destruction and is banished into the multiverse by the other Monitors; he awakes as a human on New Earth. Having only partial memories of his past, he begins searching for his "word of attention," a word that he believes will return him home. After Darkseid spreads the Anti-Life Equation to the Earth, he is captured by Darkseid's forces for being, apparently, immune to Anti-Life. There a man with hairy, dexterous fingers in the corner makes him remember his Monitor love, Weeja Dell. When the Justifiers come to get him, another man (Metron) solves a Rubik's Cube in 17 moves (one less than the smallest possible number of moves necessary to solve any Rubik's Cube), and then emits a burst of blue light. After that it is shown that Nix has apparently received new powers as a Multiversal Monitor of the Fifth World, with monitors around his head showing the events that are happening across the multiverse. "The Judge of All Evil" confronts Mandrakk in "the black hole at the base of creation" with an army of Supermen recruited from across the multiverse that is reinforced by Uotan restoring the Zoo Crew (then trapped as ordinary animals) by returning their humanity, costumes and powers, and restores Earth-51 before the world of the Monitors comes to an end. At the end of Final Crisis, it is revealed that Nix Uotan is the son of Mandrakk.

In the end, the world of the Monitors is destroyed, as Nix Uotan holds Weeja Dell, telling her that Superman's wish was "for a happy ending". Nix Uotan is once reborn as a human in Metropolis, where he is now the lone Monitor retained by the Over Monitor to maintain his function.

Uotan's name, pronounced "Wotan", is derived from the name of the Norse god Wotan, who similarly underwent great trials in order to be reborn as a purer, wiser being.

==== Dax Novu / Mandrakk ====
Known initially as The Radiant One, the first son of the limitless Monitor, who first mapped the multiverse. It is not made clear whether he is the same being as the original, nameless "Monitor" of Crisis on Infinite Earths, or the original "probe" created by the Overmonitor intelligence to explore the multiverse. After becoming corrupted by exposure to Bleed and the stories within the multiverse, Novu created a thought-robot in the shape of Superman as protection against the foretold foe of the Monitors, Mandrakk, and a tomb for that foe which would not open until a Doomsday clock mounted on its doors reached zero, at the same moment as the Superman Thought-Robot became active. He then entered the tomb and allegedly "Gave His Life To Chain The Beast In Darkness".

Superman Beyond #2 revealed the false nature of this last detail: Dax Novu was in fact transformed into Mandrakk by his corruption, and sealed away for revealing to the other Monitors that they were all, similarly, vampires surviving on the life-force of the multiverse. As Mandrakk, he became a vampire Monitor, desiring to feed on the "Bleed", the lifeblood of the cosmos in which all universes are suspended, until nothing remained except him. The Dax Novu version of Mandrakk is defeated by Superman on the World of Nil, eventually being consumed by the Over Monitor void. However, after its 'Brother' and disciple, Rox Ogama, is banished to the Limbo world, Ogama corrupts the Ultraman of the Anti-Matter universe to become his "Vampire Superman", while transforming to become the new incarnation of Mandrakk.

In Final Crisis #7, this new incarnation of Mandrakk awaits Superman at the destruction of the multiverse by Darkseid; however, the newly reborn "Judge of All Evil", Nix Uotan, assembles an army of the various Supermen of the multiverse - as well as others - to defeat him. As the various incarnations of Superman all derive their power from sunlight - toxic to vampires - their presence weakens Mandrakk, causing him to burst into flame and thus be susceptible to a blow from a stake created by a squad of Green Lanterns. In this 'last stand', Mandrakk/Rox Ogama reveals that Nix Uotan is in fact his son with Zillo Valla, a fact which Uotan admits, concluding that only Mandrakk's son could be Mandrakk's killer.

==== Other Monitors ====
- Prime Monitor Tahoteh, the eldest of the Monitors. After Superman (in the form of a gigantic robot) defeats Mandrakk, he carves the words "To Be Continued" into his own headstone; this gesture shocks Tahoteh to the extent that he realizes the full extent of the Monitors' toxic nature towards the multiverse, a state of mind dismissed by his successor, Zip Hermuz, as senility. Tahoteh's name is derived from Thoth, the ancient Egyptian god of writing.
- Zip Hermuz, who oversees the Multiverse Machine (also called the "Orrery of Worlds"); he assumes rank of Prime Monitor from Tahoteh by the end of Final Crisis. Hermuz' name is derived from Hermes, the Greek god of writing.
- Weeja Dell, Monitrix of Earth-6, Nix Uotan's past life lover, who is appalled at Uotan's banishment and awaits his return. Weeja Dell's name is derived from that of Marvel Comic's Shalla-Bal, lost love of the Silver Surfer.
- Unknown, a Monitrix of Earth-9, who stated she is the monitor of a world "Tangent" to the others.
- Zillo Valla, Monitrix of Earth-43, an older Monitor sympathetic to Weeja Dell's pain. It was she who supported Solomon in his war against the corrupting influences upon the multiverse in Countdown to Final Crisis and she gathers the super-champions of the multiverse in a last-ditch effort to save her world in Final Crisis. She is killed by Mandrakk and is also revealed that she was the lover of Dax Novu before he became Mandrakk, it is also revealed that she is the mother of Nix Uotan who she sired with Rox Ogama. Zillo Valla's name is also derived from that of Shalla-Bal.
- Rox Ogama, Monitor of Earth-31, who like Solomon before him postulates that the evolution of the multiverse is corrupting the other Monitors. Unknown to his brethren, he operated in secret to accommodate Mandrakk's release. He was banished after Mandrakk's defeat, and conspired to create a new army to take revenge on all existence, becoming the new Mandrakk in the process. His vampiric tendencies and the ease of his corruption by Mandrakk may reflect his world's vampiric qualities. Before his death, it is revealed that he is the Father of Nix Uotan, who he sired with Zillo Valla at some point. Ogama's name is derived from Ogma, Celtic God of Writing.

==== Rebirth ====
In Final Crisis #7, Superman uses the Miracle Machine to restore the multiverse to the way it was before Darkseid interfered, and in doing so also brings about the end of the Monitors. In their final moments, Nix Uotan condemns his fellow Monitors, claiming that the multiverse deserves to be free of their interference. The monitors fade to white, and Nix returns to his human form. Grant Morrison stated that the Overvoid/Overmonitor retained Nix as his direct interface with the multiverse, similar to the Silver Surfer or the Third Doctor (Doctor Who).

== Other versions ==
- A Monitor appears in Tiny Titans.
- The Monitors play prominent roles in the comic book continuation of the television series Smallville. In the mini-series Smallville: Alien it is revealed that the Monitors are not benevolent, but are actively pursuing the destruction of the Multiverse as they destroyed Earth Two to prove a point, leaving only that world's Chloe Sullivan. The "lead" Monitor Ray-Lan was captured by Lex Luthor in Russia, and Lan and the threat were stopped by Superman and the Justice League by defeating their weapon, an "Omega Monitor".

== In other media ==
Mar Novu / The Monitor, based on the original Monitor, appears prominently in the 2018 Arrowverse crossover events Elseworlds and Crisis on Infinite Earths on The CW, portrayed by LaMonica Garrett. As an "extraterrestrial being of infinite power", the Monitor uses the Book of Destiny to test different Earths in the multiverse in preparation for an "coming crisis" with the help of John Deegan. In "Crisis on Infinite Earths", Mar Novu is killed by the Anti-Monitor before the destruction of the old multiverse. Upon the creation of the new multiverse, the Anti-Monitor is defeated.
