= Monarch (comics) =

- Monarch (Hank Hall) kills Dove in Armageddon 2001 #2 (October 1991), art by Dan Jurgens.

Publication information
- Publisher: DC Comics
- First appearance: Armageddon 2001 #1 (May 1991)
- Created by: Archie Goodwin; Denny O'Neil; Dan Jurgens

In-story information
- Alter ego: Hank Hall; Nathaniel Adam
- Notable aliases: Extant, Hawk, Captain Atom, Lord Monarch
- Abilities: Powered armor grants: Energy projection; Energy manipulation; Energy absorption; Vast superhuman strength; Superhuman durability; Invulnerability; Flight; Teleportation; Quantum field manipulation; Matter absorption and manipulation

Monarch is the name of three fictional DC Comics supervillains. The first Monarch is Hank Hall, formerly Hawk, who later renames himself Extant for the Zero Hour: Crisis in Time! crossover event. The second Monarch is a quantum field duplicate of Nathaniel Adam (Captain Atom). The third Monarch is a mentally unstable Captain Atom. Monarch was created by Archie Goodwin, Denny O'Neil, and Dan Jurgens and first appeared in Armageddon 2001 #1 (May 1991).

== Hank Hall ==
Monarch is an oppressive tyrant from a bleak, dystopian Earth in the year A.D. 2030. The people are unhappy with his rule, particularly a scientist named Matthew Ryder, an expert on temporal studies, who is convinced he can use his technology to travel back in time and prevent the maniacal ruler from ever coming to power. He learns that, in 1991, one of Earth's heroes eventually turned evil, eliminated the other superheroes of Earth, and became Monarch, who would conquer the world 10 years later.

=== Armageddon 2001 ===
Chosen by Monarch to take part in a time-travel experiment, Matthew Ryder travels back to the DC Universe of 1991. Ryder decides to find out who Monarch really was and, if possible, kill him before he can rise to power. As he travels through the rift, his body mutates into a form of living temporal energy, and upon arriving at his destination, he takes the name Waverider.

Although Waverider uses his abilities to look into the possible future of various characters, he cannot pinpoint who will become Monarch. However, he accidentally comes into physical contact with Captain Atom, unleashing a storm of temporal energy that opens a gate to the future through which Monarch emerges.

In a subsequent battle with the Justice League, Monarch retreats, taking Dawn Granger, the current Dove, with him. Hank Hall follows and catches up to Monarch, only for Monarch to kill Dove. Hank beats Monarch to death, only to learn that he is Monarch's past self.

Upon seeing Monarch's dead body and the device he is building to enslave humanity, Hank muses that the Earth will need someone to keep the balance, so he puts on Monarch's armor and continues building his machine. Eventually, the Justice League finds him and Captain Atom, feeling guilty that he let Monarch slip through the timestream in the first place, decides to fight him one-on-one. The battle causes Atom's energy and Monarch's suit to clash, creating a portal that sends them both back in time to the Mesozoic. Hank wins the fight, but is stuck in the past and unable to return to the present. Hank goes into a deep sleep, waiting to wake up in his own timeline.

=== Extreme Justice ===
In an experiment in the 1960s, Nathaniel Adam is housed in a shell of alien metal, under which an atomic bomb is detonated, propelling him into the "quantum field". There, the metal fuses with him, allowing him to survive in the void and giving him a connection to the quantum field. The excess metal forms into a replica of Adam.

In the quantum field, the real Adam meets the original Monarch, Hank Hall, who is revealed to have become trapped there after the events of Armageddon: The Alien Agenda. Adam trains Hall to manipulate the quantum field, enough to allow Hall to gain powers of time travel and escape back into the timestream. In return for helping him escape, Hall sends the Monarch armor back to Nathaniel Adam in the quantum field.

=== Zero Hour: Crisis in Time! ===
In the Zero Hour: Crisis in Time! miniseries, Monarch joins forces with renegade Green Lantern Hal Jordan (at this time known as Parallax), in a bid to reshape the universe. He confronts Waverider and absorbs him and most of his time-warping abilities, giving him the power to travel through time as he pleases, and renames himself Extant.

Some time after Zero Hour: Crisis in Time!, Extant returns to mount a new attempt to remake reality by acquiring the Worlogog, which was initially entrusted to the android Hourman before he spread it out across time, as its power was too dangerous. Despite Extant remaking the universe, he is defeated when the fragment of the Worlogog Hourman kept for himself creates a subtle flaw in Extant's power, allowing Hourman to share his 'Hour of Power' with the JSA and Metron and tear the Worlogog out on Extant. With his power weakened, Extant is killed while trying to escape when Atom Smasher, with the aid of Metron, swaps Extant with Atom Smasher's mother, who had been killed in a plane crash, the weakened Extant dying in the crash instead.

== Nathaniel Adam ==
Nathaniel Adam as Monarch from Countdown #44, art by Ed Benes.

=== Extreme Justice (continued) ===
In the 1990s, Adam uses the Monarch armor to escape the quantum field as the new Monarch. This Monarch claims to be a hero, much to the annoyance of Captain Atom, and is very popular. He is assisted by Justice League International's former United Nations liaison, Catherine Cobert, with whom Captain Atom once had a relationship.

It is eventually revealed that Monarch's true plan is to control the world via genetic implants he inserts into people under the guise of healing them. This plan is prevented when Booster Gold's future biology proves resistant to the implants. What became of this version of Monarch is unknown.

=== Captain Atom ===
In Superman/Batman #6, Captain Atom is blasted to the WildStorm universe for the Captain Atom: Armageddon storyline. He returns to the DC Universe during Infinite Crisis, in the Superman/Batman series, and at the end of the miniseries.

During the "One Year Later" storyline (2006), Atom is revealed to be contained by the modern day Atomic Knights inside a secret S.H.A.D.E. facility in Blüdhaven, and used to administer radiation treatments to metahumans. Later, in 2008's Countdown, it was revealed that the changes that were to befall Captain Atom in this period were due to the actions of Solomon, one of the newly-born Monitors who attacks Captain Atom almost as soon as he arrives back to New Earth from the WildStorm Universe and damages his metal shell, causing him to leak dangerous amounts of radiation.

The Knights fit Atom with an updated version of the Monarch armor to contain the radiation leaking from his breached skin. Captain Atom awakens and breaks free of the facility. He then apparently kills the rampaging Major Force by absorbing his energy, and, after the city has been evacuated, triggers a vast explosion, obliterating the remains of Blüdhaven.

=== Countdown ===
Monarch plays a substantial role in Countdown to Final Crisis. In the Bleed, he has gathered a colossal army from across the multiverse to battle the Monitors. In Countdown to Final Crisis #26, he wishes to unleash a crisis wave which will destroy the multiverse and leave there only one unified reality, ruled by him.

The miniseries Countdown: Arena features Monarch arranging battles between alternate versions of characters throughout the multiverse to compile the strike team for his new multiverse army. During the Arena battle, Monarch is attacked by the Captain Atom Brigade, composed of every version of Captain Atom in the multiverse. After Monarch destroys the Captain Atom Brigade, he absorbs their power and takes his army to war with the Monitors. Superman-Prime redoubles his attack on Monarch and rips open the chest plate of Monarch's containment armor, causing an explosion of quantum energy that devastates Earth-51. An amnesiac Captain Atom resurfaces in Superman's Pal Jimmy Olsen Special #2 (2009) and subsequently embarks on a path of redemption.

== Powers and abilities ==
Monarch's powers stem from his ability to manipulate the quantum field, and he has demonstrated the powers of flight, teleportation (even between different realities), energy projection, manipulation and absorption abilities, superhuman strength and invulnerability (Superman's punches did not faze him), matter absorption and manipulation abilities and a vaguely defined awareness.

After absorbing Major Force and every version of Captain Atom in the multiverse, Monarch's powers are exceedingly strong. He was able to beat three versions of Superman and Wonder Woman at one time in Countdown: Arena with one blow, go toe to toe with a Guardian-charged Superboy-Prime, incinerate Lobo and defeat all of his counterparts with ease.

=== Equipment ===
The original Monarch's armor was crafted using advanced technology from an alternate future, it was highly durable, could fire positronic charges from his eyes and gloves, had a teleportation device, and probably other uncatalogued functions. The updated Monarch armor, currently worn by Captain Atom, contains a "nanoweave" designed to contain radiation leaking from a breach in his chest. It also contained instruments for monitoring his vital signs through a direct neural interface.
