= Wonder Woman: Godwatch =

Comic book story arc

- Publisher: DC Comics
- Publication date: April – August 2017
- Genre: Superhero; Mythology
- Title(s): Wonder Woman vol. 5, #16, 18, 20, 22, 24
- Main character(s): Wonder Woman; Veronica Cale; Cheetah

Creative team
- Writer: Greg Rucka
- Artist: Bilquis Evely
- Colorist: Romulo Fajardo Jr.

"Godwatch" is a five issue comic book story arc written by Greg Rucka, with pencils by Bilquis Evely and colors by Romulo Fajardo Jr. This arc takes place concurrently alongside The Truth. The story was released to critical acclaim.

Similar to Wonder Woman: Year One, this story takes place years prior to the odd-numbered issues in Greg Rucka's issues of Wonder Woman.

== Story ==
Veronica Cale talks with her colleague and dearest friend Adrianna Anderson about Wonder Woman, and Veronica does not like the Amazon because to her Diana acts so morally superior, saying love heals all things. Adrianna is trying to make a machine named Cyberwalker work, but it has a big problem: after two minutes of functionality, the walker ceases to exist, getting lost in the neural dimension. Moments later, Veronica learns her daughter was victim of an horrendous, paranormal incident in Switzerland. Adrianna tries to calm Veronica down but then they face a mysterious pair of twins (Deimos and Phobos), and they want Veronica to read the mind of Wonder Woman to find the location of Themyscira in exchange for them reviving Isadore (Veronica's daughter).

Using an innocent man as bait and throwing him in the cage of the Chimera captured by Diana herself a few hours before, Deimos and Phobos attract Diana into a trap. Adrianna took control of the Cyberwalker, but upon failing her task gets imprisoned in the system and is killed. Enraged and desperate, Veronica Cale swears revenge for all people involved.

Veronica Cale successfully builds an AI based upon a piece of neural residue left by her friend Adrianna Anderson and the AI names itself Doctor Cyber. Diana is trying to convince Barbara Minerva to renounce to take part in an expedition to search about the myth of the African god Urzkartaga, but Barbara ignores her and it is revealed that Veronica is financing the expedition and wants to turn Barbara into a demigod to get her daughter's soul back.

Diana accepts that Barbara will go to the expedition and gives her a distress signal that will reach her from anywhere in the world. Barbara takes it and goes on, without anybody knowing Veronica ordered Doctor Cyber to infiltrate the device, breaking it. Veronica then orchestrates a series of events to take care of Diana and make sure she was nowhere near her friend: when she arrives to the jungle of Bwanda, she just find her device broken on the ground and her friend turned into a cannibalistic monster called the Cheetah.

Cheetah and Diana clashed over the years, and Cheetah's last job was to bring to Veronica the last ingredient for a rite necessary to summon the witch Circe: once she appeared, she strikes a deal with Cale, who wants to bind Deimos and Phobos, snatching their scepter from them. In the scepter is a soulstone, containing the soul of Izzy: she wants Circe to free her after she bound the two twins. Circe tells her that to succeed she must follow every instruction she delivers her to the letter.

Trying to stop a terrorist attack, Diana is tricked by Circe to use the Lasso on her; once she has contact with it, she can perform the ritual she promised to Veronica, binding Phobos and Deimos to a couple of dogs. Then, getting back to Washington, she realizes that the soulstone is broken, telling Veronica Izzy's soul is no longer in there. The twins are threatened and in their state they must answer: Izzy is imprisoned together with Ares, Phobos and Deimos father The only way to get Isadore back is to free the God of War, unleashing eternal violence on Earth: Circe disagrees, but Veronica does not care and she will do what she has to have her daughter back.

Wonder Woman meets Veronica Cale in Las Vegas, participating in a fundraising event for the victims of war in the Middle East. The two discuss about why Veronica decided to spend fifteen million dollars for the date: Diana knows Veronica uses Team Poison to deal with human traffickers around the world, and their personal guards killed several criminals. After talking about the no-kill clause of the Justice League, Veronica confesses that she wanted Diana to perform a mission for her: some of the criminals she tried to stop are coming for her, and she wants to be protected, but also she wants the criminals to remain alive, so she can cut a deal with them. Diana knows Team Poison would not be able to use non-lethal force, so she accepts: she does not know that Doctor Cyber analyze her phenomenal Lasso of Truth during the conversation.

Adrianna tells Veronica her theory about that the Lasso is right: it sends out a different kind of wave that resonates with several places around the world, places where there's nothing like Themyscira, Nanda Parbat and the Olympus exist. Veronica needs to breach in another dimension to find Themyscira. While she says this, Adrianna disappears as Wonder Woman is approaching Veronica's offices. Wonder Woman reveals that she knows other things about Veronica interfered with Barbara Minerva's tracking device during the incident she had in Africa, leading to her transformation in the Cheetah. Diana tells Veronica Cale that she will watch every move she makes before leaving.

After the events that happened in The Truth, Steve Trevor embraces Wonder Woman and they watches Veronica leave without explanations. Diana tells Steve about Isadore, the girl without a face that Cale brought with them: she must live in Themyscira, because if she comes back to Earth she will be split again, shell and spirit living separated. This means Veronica won't be able to see her daughter anymore. Shifting then to another thing, Diana wants to know where the Cheetah is, as she was with the group before her and Veronica entered inside Ares' prison. Steve explains her she disappeared soon after they crossed the portal. As Steve and Diana leave, with Wonder Woman hoping everything will be all right for her friend, the Cheetah tries to traverse the portal: she wants to meet the Amazons and to see Themyscira, the pinnacle of a lifetime work. But when the portal rejects her, she promises she will get her revenge on gods and Amazons alike.

Etta informs Diana and Steve that Sasha Bordeaux was used as part of a newly developed Cyberwalker System: she is now in the hospital, recovering and without memory of what happened in the last six months. After discussing with Diana the fact that she had to leave her Lasso of Truth behind, Etta tells her friend that she left behind Barbara as well.

As Adrianna tries to comfort her, Veronica explodes at her, telling she is not her friend Adrianna Anderson, but just Doctor Cyber. The Cheetah appears inside Veronica's house: she wants to know if Veronica suffers for all the things she did, if she feels guilty. Veronica admits it, and Barbara tells her this makes her happy. Miss Cale then tells the Cheetah that right now she cannot reverse her transformation, as her labs are sealed by authorities. Cheetah tells her that she does not care and just wants to kill Veronica for revenge Luckily for Veronica, Diana tracked the Cheetah and reached her house to stop her from killing Cale. After choking Cheetah, rendering her unconscious, Diana flies away with her friend telling Cale she will always be alone.

== Critical reception ==
According to Comic Book Roundup, Wonder Woman Volume 5 Issue 16 received a score of 8.6 out of 10 based on 8 reviews.

According to Comic Book Roundup, Wonder Woman Issue 18 received a score of 8.7 out of 10 based on 10 reviews.

According to Comic Book Roundup, Wonder Woman Issue 20 received a score of 8.9 out of 10 based on 12 reviews.

According to Comic Book Roundup, Wonder Woman Issue 22 received a score of 7.6 out of 10 based on 13 reviews.

According to Comic Book Roundup, Wonder Woman Issue 24 received a score of 9.1 out of 10 based on 14 reviews.

== Collected editions ==
- Wonder Woman Vol. 4: Godwatch collects Wonder Woman vol. 5 #16, 18, 20, 22, 24, and Wonder Woman Annual #1, 144 pages, November 2017, ISBN 978-1401274603
- Wonder Woman: The Rebirth Deluxe Edition, Book 2 collects Wonder Woman vol. 5 #15-25 and a selection from Wonder Woman Annual #1, 288 pages, July 2018, ISBN 978-1401280932
