= Wonder Woman: The Lies =

Comic series written by Greg Rucka

- Publisher: DC Comics
- Publication date: August 2016 – January 2017
- Genre: Superhero; Mythology
- Title(s): Wonder Woman vol. 5, #1, 3, 5, 7, 9, 11 and Wonder Woman: Rebirth #1
- Main character(s): Wonder Woman; Cheetah

Creative team
- Writer: Greg Rucka
- Artist: Liam Sharp
- Colorist: Laura Martin

"The Lies" is a seven issue comic book story arc written by Greg Rucka, with pencils by Liam Sharp and colors by Laura Martin.

Released in 2016, this was the first arc of the relaunched Wonder Woman series during the DC Rebirth event.

== Story ==
Wonder Woman finds her memories changing. She returns to her apartment and tests one of her memories by trying to crush the Helmet of War easily (which is impossible). She then uses her lasso to probe deeper and finds out she had been deceived. Changing her costume, Wonder Woman, goes to Olympus and concludes that it is a lie and vows to find the truth.

Wonder Woman is trying to find Cheetah. While trying to find her, she prays to an altar, and a group of hyena-men hybrids attack her. Cheetah arrives and Wonder Woman tells Cheetah she cannot find Themyscira. Meanwhile, Commander Etta Candy commands Steve Trevor to capture Colonel Cadulo. Cheetah accuses Wonder Woman of turning her into this creature and it is revealed the hybrids are called Boudas by Urzkartaga, an evil African god of plants. During a fight with Boudas, Cheetah nearly loses controls and eats the hybrids but Diana calms her down. It is later revealed that Cadulo has captured Trevor's team.

Colonel Cadulo is the servant of Uzrkataga and plans to revive Uzrkataga from the dead. Cadulo tells Steve Trevor he will use him as a vessel and asks him where Wonder Woman is. Wonder Woman talks about Cheetah's uncontrollable bloodlust and Cheetah reveals she is starting to forget who she once was. Diana tells Cheetah that she cannot go back to Themyscira because something is blocking her and plans to find out the culprit. Wonder Woman and Cheetah go to Cadulo's hideout but find Steve missing.

Wonder Woman and Cheetah interrupt the process and save Steve Trevor. Wonder Woman and Cheetah use the Lasso of Truth to defeat Uzkataga alongside the captured girls. During the fight, Cheetah returns to her human self, Barbara Minevra. Steve Trevor returns to Etta Candy while Wonder Woman helps Barbara return to her normal life. Veronica Cale learns Barbara had been cured, and sets her plans in motion. Steve meets up with Wonder Woman and after talking about her relationship with Superman, both of them rekindle their romance. Barbara calls them and tells them that Themyscira is not a real place but a divine location, and tells Wonder Woman to go to the area where both Earth and Themyscira meet. Wonder Woman and Steve Trevor do this, and they apparently see Hippolyta and the Amazons.

Etta Candy discovers that Director Bordeaux is working for someone different than the Army: she is a cyborg at the service of Veronica Cale, and Etta discovers it when Sasha delivers the remains of Urzkartaga to Cale. After destroying Sasha, Veronica sends her dogs to take care of Etta. Meanwhile, Steve Trevor is doubtful: the Themyscira he is in together with Diana is a place he has never seen. It is not the same, and the people are vastly different as well. As he tells this to Diana, the Amazon's old snake bite reignites, with blood flowing from it. Understanding the sign, Diana brings Steve to a plain where an old, decaying tree stood. The tree from which the serpent who bit her came from. But when she looks for it, her memory shatters once again: crying, she realizes that in all the years since she left, she never returned to Themyscira, and all her memories about her return are false.

== Critical reception ==
The story was released to critical acclaim with critics praising the strong start and introduction of Wonder Woman, Cheetah, and Steve Trevor. According to Comic Book Roundup, the entire story received an average score of 8.3 out of 10 based on 559 reviews.

== Collected editions ==
- Wonder Woman Vol. 1: The Lies collects Wonder Woman: Rebirth #1 and Wonder Woman vol. 5 #1, 3, 5, 7, 9, 11, 176 pages, February 2017, ISBN 978-1401267780
- Wonder Woman: The Rebirth Deluxe Edition, Book 1 collects Wonder Woman: Rebirth #1 and Wonder Woman vol. 5 #1–14, 360 pages, October 2017, ISBN 978-1401276782
