= Demolition Team =

Fictional team of mercenaries

- The Demolition Team, art by Dave Gibbons.

Publication information
- Publisher: DC Comics
- First appearance: Green Lantern (vol. 2) #176 (May 1984)
- Created by: Len Wein; Dave Gibbons

In-story information
- Member(s): Hardhat; Jackhammer; Rosie; Scoopshovel; Steamroller

The Demolition Team are a fictional team of mercenaries in the DC Comics universe. They first appeared in Green Lantern #176 (May 1984) and were created by Len Wein and Dave Gibbons.

== Fictional character history ==
In their initial appearance, Congressman Jason Bloch hires the Demolition Team to destroy the Los Angeles branch of Ferris Aircraft. The Ferris employees are virtually defenseless against the team and their state-of-the-art weaponry provided by the Monitor. Help finally arrives in the form of the Predator, who defeated the entire team unaided.

Rosie, together with several other scientific geniuses and cybernetic beings (Automan, Brainstorm, Doctor Cyber, Ford, and Emil Hamilton), was briefly part of the composite cybernetic being Enginehead.

Most of the team were killed at the hands of the OMACs during the events of The OMAC Project, but Hardhat was seen alive in Infinite Crisis. Still later, Hardhat is seen among the "forgotten characters" of Limbo. Hardhat is rescued by Superman and assists in the battle against the cosmic threat of Mandrakk.

== Members ==
- Hardhat - A former heavyweight boxing palooka from New York City. His powered helmet and harness make him a human juggernaut.
- Jackhammer - A former oil rig worker from Houston. He carries a large jackhammer.
- Rosie - The leader of the Demolition Team. A former, no-nonsense bar owner in New Orleans, she wields a rapid-fire hot rivet gun.
- Scoopshovel - A former professional jai-alai player from San Diego. His hydraulic power-arm allows him to dig up almost anything.
- Steamroller - A former motorcycle stunt rider from Chicago. He rides a compact version of a steamroller that can flatten buildings.

== In other media ==
=== Television ===
- Steamroller makes non-speaking appearances in Teen Titans. This version is an android who initially appears as a member of H.I.V.E. before joining the Brotherhood of Evil.
- The Demolition Team appear in the Arrow episode "Code of Silence", consisting of Rosie (portrayed by Rachel Luttrell), Hardhat (portrayed by Marc Trottier), and Jackhammer (portrayed by Daniel Cudmore). This version of the group specialize in destroying buildings and wield regular equipment.

=== Miscellaneous ===
The Demolition Team appear in Justice League Unlimited #43.

== See also ==
- Wrecking Crew- A similar themed group from Marvel Comics
