= Wonder Woman: The Truth =

Seven issue comic book story arc written by Greg Rucka

- Publisher: DC Comics
- Publication date: March – August 2017
- Genre: Superhero; Mythology
- Title(s): Wonder Woman vol. 5, #13, 15, 17, 19, 21, 23, 25
- Main character: Wonder Woman

Creative team
- Writer: Greg Rucka
- Artist: Liam Sharp
- Colorist: Laura Martin

"The Truth" is a seven issue comic book story arc written by Greg Rucka, with pencils by Liam Sharp and colors by Laura Martin.

== Story ==
Steve Trevor and Wonder Woman try to find Themyscira but they find it as a barren wasteland in the middle of the Black Sea. Wonder Woman has a nervous breakdown and Steve tries calling ARGUS for a way home. He receives a message from Etta Candy that enemies are coming to attack, and Steve takes them all down by using his resources. Steve Trevor then hands Wonder Woman over to Argus so she can get treated and leaves her.

While in Nightsong Hospital, Wonder Woman has an identity crisis and does not know whats real or not. She daydreams of her life as a superheroine and has an illusion of a snake telling her she must face the truth. Queen Queen Hippolyta waits for Wonder Woman to return home, but the priestess Castalia has dire, black news: an omen, the withered tree, once again appeared on the island. The Amazons must prepare for war. Steve Trevor meets with Barbara Ann Minevra and Etta Janes after their encounter with Veronica Cale to discuss about a new threat called Godwatch, a group that is obsessed with Wonder Woman. The group decides to go meet up with Wonder Woman's old ally, The Minotaur.

Hippolyta talks about her deepest fear: Diana has fallen while fighting, and thus the tree appeared once again, an omen, a sign of her failure. But Castalia assures her that it could mean Wonder Woman has been defeated, but not killed and cuts down the tree. Still troubled by her memories and her identity, Diana tries once again to come to reason, chatting with her illusion of a snake. They confront on the multiple women she remembers being, and step by step they try to find some sense into Diana's broken mind. Veronica Cale blackmails Barbara Ann to turn back to the Cheetah if she wants to save Steve Trevor, Etta Candy as well as being the bridge between God and Man.

The Minotaur breaks in the Hospital and makes Wonder Woman remember who she was and she reunites with Steve and Etta. Steve tells Wonder Woman that the place they found was a fake Themyscira, and their real enemy is Godwatch, and Veronica Cale orders Cheetah and her army to target Wonder Woman. Queen Hippolyta sees patrons in the forms of animals appear in front of her, realizing that Wonder Woman is back. Wonder Woman meets Doctor Cyber (the assistant of Veronica Cale) when she is suddenly shot in the back by Team POISON.

After being shot to the chest by Colonel Marina Maru with a sniper rifle, Diana counters with the help of Steve Trevor: with Steve handling the rest of Team Poison, Diana reaches the Colonel's spot, knocking her out before she could do more damage. Queen Hippolyta rallies her troops, and tells them to unsheathe their weapons, as the Amazons prepare for war. Veronica Cale and Cheetah arrive at the place where Themyscira is at the same time Wonder Woman and Steve arrive. During the scuffle between Wonder Woman and Cheetah, Cheetah draws blood from Wonder Woman which causes her and Veronica Cale to disappear. Veronica Cale reveals she wants to find Themyscira to get her dead daughter back, and Wonder Woman meets Ares. Ares used to be a bloodthirsty God but then he met Aphrodite and fell in love with her and gave birth to Deimos and Phobos. Phobos and Deimos need to free their father to be able to fully utilize their powers of spreading fear, horror and despair to everyone. Deimos and Phobos manage to successfully breach Themyscira and start attacking the Amazons, and Ares explains to Diana that he was the snake that bit her arm back when she was still in Themyscira so that he could explain her that it is the love of Aphrodite, and not the chains of Hephaestus, that bounded him. Understanding what she has to do, Diana tells Ares to let Phobos and Deimos in.

Wonder Woman wraps herself in the Lasso of Truth and tells the twins that she loves them The two first react with anger, but then surrender to sadness and realize they need the love the Amazon is offering. As the twins are bound and not dangerous anymore, Veronica wants to bring her daughter back to the real world but Ares explains to Veronica that it will be an unwise decision since her daughter will be split and not normal. Veronica begrudgingly lets her daughter be with the Amazons and Queen Hippolyta tells Diana that she is proud of her before the gate closes.

Wonder Woman helps the Justice League take down a villain and meets with Veronica Cale to tell her to cure Cheetah but Veronica Cale refuses. Wonder Woman vents out her frustrations about the patrons deceiving her to Batman and Superman but after them telling Wonder Woman to not give up on hope, Wonder Woman goes meet with the patrons and regains her Lasso of Truth. She then meets up with Steve Trevor who tells her he bought her a new home and offers to give her a tour around the house.

== Collected editions ==
- Wonder Woman Vol. 3: The Truth collects Wonder Woman vol. 5 #13, 15, 17, 19, 21, 23, 25, 176 pages, August 2017, ISBN 978-1401271411
- Wonder Woman: The Rebirth Deluxe Edition, Book 2 collects Wonder Woman vol. 5 #15-25 and a selection from Wonder Woman Annual #1, 288 pages, July 2018, ISBN 978-1401280932

== Critical reception ==
According to Comic Book Roundup, the storyline received largely positive reviews. The entire storyline received an average score of 8.3 out of 10 based on 85 reviews on Comic Book Roundup.
