= Cheetah (character) =

DC Comics supervillain

- The Barbara Minerva incarnation of Cheetah as depicted in Wonder Woman #750 (January 2020). Art by Nicola Scott.

Publication information
- Publisher: DC Comics
- First appearance: Wonder Woman #6 (1943) (Priscilla); Wonder Woman (vol. 2) #7 (August 1987) (Minerva)
- Created by: Rich: William Moulton Marston; Harry G. Peter; Minerva: Len Wein; George Pérez

In-story information
- Full name: Priscilla Rich; Barbara Ann Minerva
- Species: Human (Priscilla); Demigod/Werecat (Minerva)
- Place of origin: New York (Priscilla); Nottinghamshire (Minerva)
- Team affiliations: Minerva: Legion of Doom; Suicide Squad; Injustice League; Justice League; Rich: Villainy Inc. Secret Society of Super-Villains
- Partnerships: Minerva: Etta Candy; Wonder Woman; Cheshire
- Supporting character of: Wonder Woman
- Notable aliases: Rich: Kay Carlton; Claudia Rich; Minerva: Priscilla Rich; Deborah Domaine; Sabrina Ballesteros
- Abilities: Rich: Skilled acrobat and combatant. Outfitted with razor claws strong enough to cut through steel. Minerva: Granted Cheetah-like physiology, allowing for superhuman strength, agility, durability, limitless speed, and razor sharp claws. Magic bite can also transform others to Cheetah-like humanoids.; Highly-intelligent archaeologist and fluent in many different languages.

Cheetah is the codename for several supervillains appearing in American comic books published by DC Comics. Among the most prominent of Wonder Woman's adversaries, the first version of the character debuted in Wonder Woman #6 (1943), created by William Moulton Marston and H. G. Peter, while the most popular incarnation debuted in Wonder Woman #7 (vol. 2; August 1987) following Crisis on Infinite Earths.

The original Cheetah is Priscilla Rich, a socialite with mental complications who gained a strong disdain for Wonder Woman. Within the Golden and Silver Age, she battled Diana and eventually was sentenced to Arkham Asylum. Following Crisis on Infinite Earths, her history is instead attributed to Hipployta's tenure as Wonder Woman until being murdered by successor Minerva, whom she had previously condemned.

The most well-known version is Dr. Barbara Ann Minerva, famed archaeologist whose interests in Greek mythology and reputation for gathering artifacts regardless of the risks leads to an encounter with Urzkartaga, a plant god who transforms her by imbuing her with the spirit of the Cheetah, making her a demigod, the plant god's bride, and the third woman to take the Cheetah codename. Once an ally and close friend of Wonder Woman when she first left Themyscira, the pair's adversarial relationship originates from Minerva's fierce blame for Diana's inability to save her while the latter seeks to save her from Urzkartaga's curse.

The Cheetah character has been adapted in various forms of media outside of comics, including animated series, films, and video games. Kristen Wiig portrayed the Barbara Minerva version of the character in the 2020 DC Extended Universe film Wonder Woman 1984, marking the character's live-action debut.

== Fictional character biography ==
=== Priscilla Rich ===
The Priscilla Rich incarnation of Cheetah as depicted in Wonder Woman #230 (1977); art by Vince Colletta and Ernie Chan.

The first Cheetah is Priscilla Rich, a debutante who has an inferiority complex and suffers from a split personality. After being eclipsed by Wonder Woman at a charity event and failing to kill her during an escapology act, Priscilla retreats to her room and collapses before her makeup mirror. There, she sees an image of a woman dressed like a cheetah who commands her to fashion a costume from a cheetah-skin rug.

The Cheetah frames Wonder Woman for a robbery by hiding the money in her apartment and tipping off the police, then sets fire to a warehouse Wonder Woman is in, although the heroine escapes. She is presumed dead, but survives thanks to her fireproof costume. The Cheetah kidnaps a young psychic girl named Gail and uses her powers to learn U.S. military secrets, which she gives to the Japanese. Wonder Woman thwarts the plot and rescues Gail, although the Cheetah warns Wonder Woman to stay out of her affairs.

Cheetah returns when an American military official organizes an athletic competition between female athletes from America and a group of women trained on Paradise Island. Priscilla ties up and gags an Olympic high hurdler named Kay Carlton, and impersonates her by donning her clothes. Priscilla infiltrates the contest, kidnaps Queen Hippolyta, and steals her magical girdle. With Hippolyta as her hostage and her abilities boosted by the girdle, the Cheetah battles Wonder Woman for control of Paradise Island. She is defeated when the Amazon manages to pull the girdle off her. Temporarily freed from the Cheetah's influence, Priscilla asks to remain on Paradise Island for treatment.

Priscilla's attempt at reformation apparently failed, as she is later seen as a member of Villainy Inc., a criminal association between several of Wonder Woman's female foes.

Priscilla has several further run-ins with Wonder Woman before giving up her criminal identity and retiring to her North Shore Maryland mansion. Kobra attempts to recruit Rich for his organization, only to find that she has become a recluse and invalid. Before Priscilla can unburden herself of having hidden her past as the Cheetah, she dies.

DC relaunched its continuity with the 1985 series Crisis on Infinite Earths, introducing a new Cheetah for the Modern Age: Barbara Ann Minerva. Priscilla Rich is established as still existing post-Crisis when Queen Hippolyta becomes the Golden Age Wonder Woman. In the present, she is seen as an elderly woman murdered in her home by Minerva at the urging of her ally Zoom. It is also established that Rich never became an invalid post-Crisis, as Minerva mentions how Priscilla had written books condemning her when she became the Cheetah. Zoom theorized that if Minerva killed Rich, she would solidify herself as the one true Cheetah and thus be a better supervillain.

=== Barbara Minerva ===
The Cheetah in Wonder Woman vol. 2 #118 (1996); art by John Byrne.

The third Cheetah is Barbara Ann Minerva, a British archaeologist and the heiress to a vast fortune in her ancient family seat in Nottinghamshire. Ambitious, selfish, and severely neurotic, Barbara finances an expedition to find a tribe in Africa, which is said to be protected by a female guardian with the powers of a cheetah. A band of marauders kill the guardian and most of the expedition party. Barbara, with the aid of a tribal priest named Chuma, the caretaker of the ancient plant god Urzkartaga, agrees to become the tribe's new guardian after being told that she will be given immortality. Her powers are conferred to her by ingesting a potion made from human blood and the berries and leaves of Urzkartaga, transforming her into a humanoid cheetah. Unfortunately for Minerva, the host of the Cheetah persona is intended to be a virgin. Minerva is not, so her transformations were part curse and part blessing, as she experiences severe pain and physical disability while in her human form and bloodthirsty euphoria in her cheetah form.

In the "One Year Later" storyline, the witch Circe places a spell on Minerva that allows her to change her appearance from human to the Cheetah at will, even though she still remains in her Cheetah form in either guise. She also gains control over three actual cheetahs and still possesses her superhuman speed. She is later seen in the Justice League of America Wedding Special, forming a new Injustice League alongside Lex Luthor and the Joker. She also appears in Salvation Run. In Final Crisis, she joins forces with Checkmate to rebel against Darkseid, and has a brief relationship with Snapper Carr. In the pages of Wonder Woman, she is revealed as the power behind the Secret Society, having taken responsibility for the creation of Genocide. She arranges to have her ally Doctor Psycho take the place of Sarge Steel as director of the Department of Metahuman Affairs which, in the middle of Genocide's onslaught, she targets for destruction.

In 2011, DC relaunched its comic books and rebooted its continuity in an initiative called The New 52. This version of Minerva previously grew up in an all-woman commune called "Amazonia". In the possession of a dagger once belonging to a lost tribe of Amazons, she accidentally cut herself on it. This caused her to become possessed by the "Goddess of the Hunt", transforming her into a human-cheetah hybrid. The origin of the Cheetah is dated back to the Sun Tribe, who for centuries had hunted alongside the cheetahs. Every generation, one of their members is chosen to become the host of the Goddess of the Hunt, until one day a hunter killed the current host; the knife used to kill her was cursed until it fell into the hands of Minerva.

After the events of DC Rebirth, Cheetah's origin was altered once more. As a young girl, Barbara Ann Cavendish enjoyed mythology and showed an affinity for languages. Her father disparaged her interest in mythology, deriding it as childish. In defiance of her father, her passion for myth and legend remained and as an adult, she changed her surname to Minerva in honor of her late mother. On a dig in Ukraine, she discovers proof of the existence of the Amazons, but the dig site collapses and is abandoned. Minerva is able to take photos before the collapse and continues her investigation until she finds herself at a dead end when she reached a deserted island in the Black Sea. After Ares attacks the naval base where Diana is staying and several of the Olympian gods assist Diana in defeating him, Minerva becomes even more obsessed with the divine. Seeking out proof of other deities, Minerva learns of Urzkartaga and obtains funding for an expedition to Africa from industrialist Veronica Cale. Unbeknownst to Minerva, Cale is acting on behalf of the sons of Ares, Deimos and Phobos, who intend to turn Minerva into a demigod like Diana so she can help them locate Themyscira. Diana provides Minerva with a Wayne Enterprises GPS signaling device in case she needed help, which Doctor Cyber, a secret ally of Ares, remotely disabled. As a result, Wonder Woman is unable to prevent Minerva from being "wed" to Urzkartaga and undergoing a ritual to become the Cheetah. Blaming Diana for letting her be transformed into a beast, the Cheetah joins Cale's Godwatch group.

In the series Cheetah & Cheshire Rob the Justice League, Minerva allies with Cheshire to steal the Power Bank from the Justice League. Amidst their heist, Minerva struggles with cannibalistic behavior, a side effect of her powers. On the Justice League Watchtower, Minerva steals a plant-like idol which she uses to summon Urzkartaga. Minerva kills Urzkartaga, returning her to her human form while retaining cheetah-like spots.

Cheetah appears in the storyline DC K.O.; returned to her werecat form, she takes part in the eponymous tournament to combat Darkseid. Following the tournament, Cheetah joins the Justice League as part of an amnesty deal given to her and other supervillains.

== Powers and abilities ==
=== Priscilla Rich's abilities ===
While possessing no super-powers, Priscilla is an Olympic-level athlete and a skilled hand-to-hand combatant known for having cat-like grace, acrobatics, and ferocity akin to her namesake. She is also outfitted with razor-sharp claws capable of cutting through solid steel.

=== Barbara Minerva's powers and abilities ===
Imbued with the spirit of the Cheetah, Minerva is granted superhuman strength and agility. She also possesses superhuman speed, is considered among the fastest characters in the DC Universe, is potentially limitless in that aspect due to the mystical nature of her powers, and able to compete with those with the Speed Force (i.e. The Flash). She also possess razor-sharp claws strong enough to cut through Kryptonian invulnerability and able to transform others into Cheetah-like beings with her bite. However, the cursed nature of her powers gives her both bloodlust and an appetite for human flesh. Without her powers, Minerva is considered highly intelligent, holding two PhDs and is fluent in eight languages, and nearly fluent in seven more.

== Other versions ==
=== Other Cheetah incarnations ===
The Deborah Domaine incarnation of Cheetah as depicted in Justice League of America #197 (December 1981). Art by George Pérez and Keith Pollard.

==== Deborah Domaine ====
Deborah "Debbi" Domaine was introduced as the niece of Priscilla Rich. She is a debutante like Rich, but feels remorse for her wealthy upbringing and decides to become an environmental activist, meeting Wonder Woman and striking up a friendship with her. Later that same day, Debbi is summoned to her aunt's mansion and finds her there, succumbing to illness before she can reveal her past to Deborah. Kobra's operatives capture Debbi and bring her and Rich's Cheetah costume to Kobra's headquarters. Revealing Rich's past as Cheetah to Debbi, the Kobra operatives torture and brainwash Debbi into becoming the second Cheetah, Rich's replacement. Debbi also appears as a member of the Secret Society of Super Villains in a conflict with both the Justice League of America and the Justice Society of America. The character does not appear following Crisis on Infinite Earths and The New 52, which both rebooted DC's continuity.

==== Sebastian Ballesteros ====
Argentine business tycoon Sebastian Ballesteros becomes the fourth and the only male Cheetah. He is an agent of the Amazon's enemy, Circe, as well as her lover. Appealing to Urzkartaga's ego, Ballesteros makes the case that the previous Cheetahs have failed in their actions and that a male Cheetah could be superior. Once Urzkartaga is convinced, Minerva's access to the Cheetah's power is cut off and Ballesteros is given the power in her place. Later, Ballesteros proves responsible for turning Wonder Woman's old friend, Vanessa Kapatelis, into the third Silver Swan. Angered at the loss of her powers, Minerva eventually battles Ballesteros for control of the power of the Cheetah by becoming the temporary host of Tisiphone, one of the Erinyes. Minerva accesses this new power by stealing it from the Furies' former host, Helena Kosmatos, the Golden Age Fury. This does not assist her in regaining the right to become the Cheetah. Minerva kills Ballesteros in his human form, regaining her Cheetah form as a result.

=== Alternate universe versions ===
- An unidentified alternate universe version of Cheetah appears in Wonder Woman: The Blue Amazon.
- An alternate universe version of Priscilla Rich / Cheetah makes a cameo appearance in DC: The New Frontier.
- An alternate universe version of Priscilla Rich / Cheetah appears in Wednesday Comics. This version is an young archaeologist from a wealthy Baltimore family whose abilities are derived from enchanted artifacts.
- An alternate universe version of Priscilla Rich / Cheetah appears in Justice. This version is a member of the Legion of Doom.
- An unidentified alternate universe version of Cheetah appears in the Odyssey storyline. This version was created from the corpse of a murdered Amazon after it is lowered into a mystical restoration pit and infused with the spirit of Magaera.
- An unidentified alternate universe version of Cheetah appears in Flashpoint. This version is a member of Wonder Woman's Furies before being killed by Etrigan.
- An unidentified incarnation of Cheetah appears in Scooby-Doo Team-Up. This version is a member of the Legion of Doom.
- An unidentified incarnation of Cheetah appears in Sensation Comics Featuring Wonder Woman.
- An alternate universe version of Priscilla Rich appears in The Legend of Wonder Woman. This version is an ally of and financial backer for the Nazi Party.
- An alternate universe version of Barbara Minerva appears in Superman: American Alien.
- An alternate universe version of Barbara Minerva appears in Wonder Woman: Dead Earth.
- An alternate universe version of Barbara Minerva appears in Absolute Wonder Woman. This version studies the Amazons and is the one who gives Diana the moniker of Wonder Woman. Additionally, the Priscilla Rich incarnation of Cheetah appears as a separate individual, a metahuman, and a member of the Suicide Squad who is later killed by Giovanni Zatara. Barbara is then turned into the new Cheetah, after accepting a deal with Urzkartaga, the Cheetah's patron god.
- The Barbara Minerva version of Cheetah appears in DC x Sonic the Hedgehog: Metal Legion, where she is a member of the Legion of Doom.

== In other media ==
=== Television ===
- The Priscilla Rich incarnation of Cheetah appears in the Super Friends franchise, voiced by Marlene Aragon. This version is a member of the Legion of Doom.
- The Barbara Minerva incarnation of Cheetah appears in series set in the DC Animated Universe (DCAU), voiced by Sheryl Lee Ralph. This version is a former scientist who was involved in valuable genetic research and eventually resorted to experimenting on herself due to lacking funding and test subjects, causing her to mutate into a human-cat hybrid. Shunned by the scientific community for her recklessness and ostracized by humanity as a freak, she turned to crime to fund further research to undo the change. In Justice League and Justice League Unlimited, Minerva respectively joins Lex Luthor's Injustice Gang and Gorilla Grodd's Secret Society.
- The Priscilla Rich incarnation of Cheetah appears in Batman: The Brave and the Bold, voiced by Morena Baccarin.
- The Barbara Minerva incarnation of Cheetah appears in the Super Best Friends Forever short "Name Game".
- The Priscilla Rich incarnation of Cheetah appears in the title sequence of the "DC Super Pets" segment of DC Nation Shorts.
- The Barbara Minerva incarnation of Cheetah appears in DC Super Hero Girls (2015) and its tie-in films, voiced by Ashley Eckstein. This version is a student at Super Hero High with an antagonistic attitude towards Wonder Woman and her classmates.
- The Priscilla Rich incarnation of Cheetah appears in DC Super Friends, voiced by Blaze Berdahl.
- The Barbara Minerva incarnation of Cheetah makes a non-speaking appearance in the Justice League Action short "Quality Time".
- The Barbara Minerva incarnation of Cheetah appears in DC Super Hero Girls (2019), voiced by Tara Strong. This version is a wealthy teenage high school student who uses the civilian nickname "Barbi", can control her transformations at will, and does not speak while transformed. Additionally, she gained her abilities after accidentally cursing herself with a cat idol while attempting to use it on Diana Prince after becoming jealous of her popularity.
- The Barbara Minerva incarnation of Cheetah makes non-speaking cameo appearances in Harley Quinn as a member of the Legion of Doom.
  - Minerva appears in Kite Man: Hell Yeah!, voiced by Lake Bell.

=== Film ===
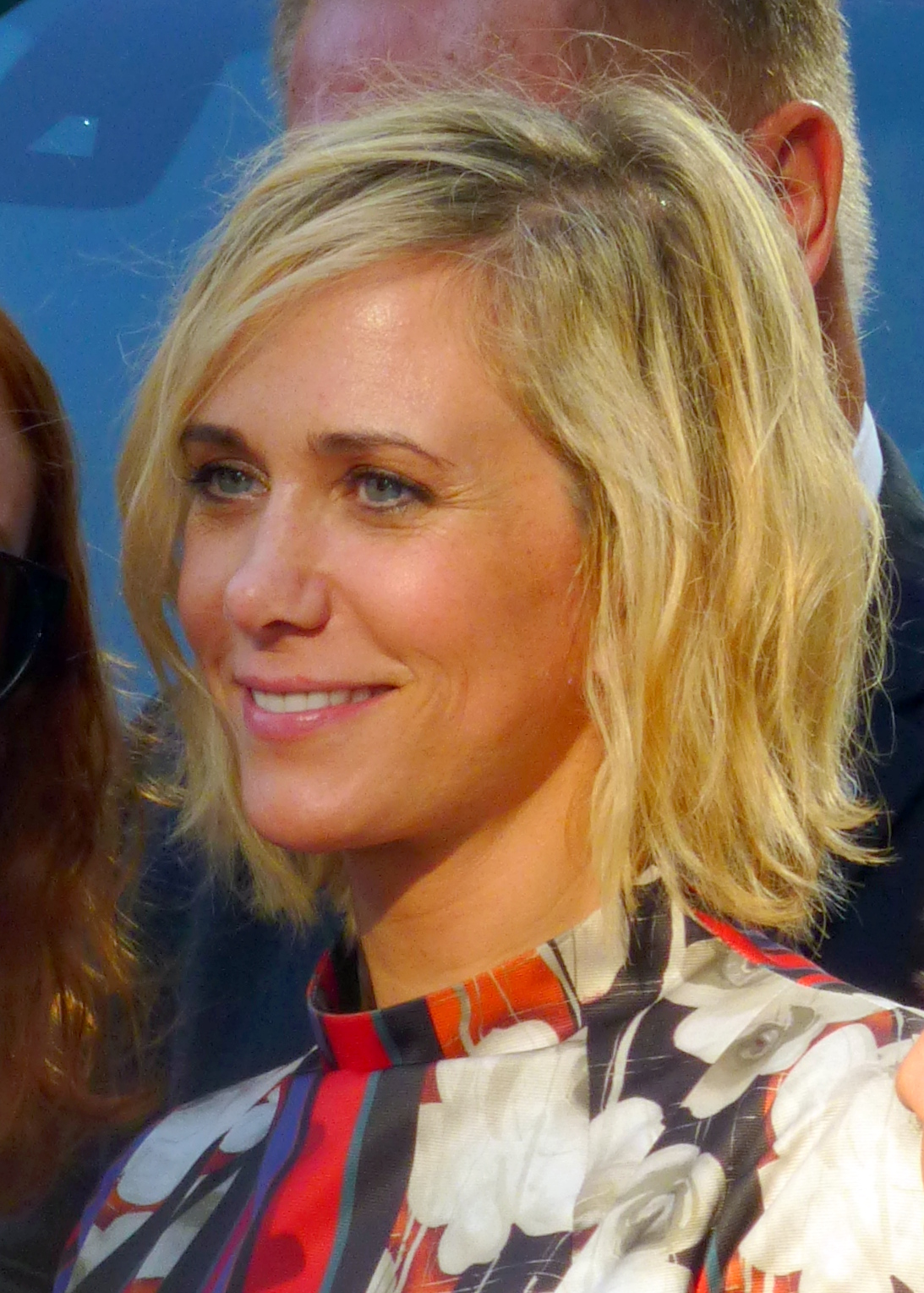
Kristen Wiig portrays Barbara Minerva / Cheetah in Wonder Woman 1984.

- The Barbara Minerva incarnation of Cheetah makes a cameo appearance in Wonder Woman (2009).
- The Priscilla Rich incarnation of Cheetah makes a cameo appearance in Justice League: The New Frontier.
- The Barbara Minerva incarnation of Cheetah makes a non-speaking cameo appearance in Superman/Batman: Public Enemies.
- The Barbara Minerva incarnation of Cheetah appears in Justice League: Doom, voiced by Claudia Black. This version is Australian and a member of Vandal Savage's Legion of Doom.
- The Barbara Minerva incarnation of Cheetah appears in JLA Adventures: Trapped in Time, voiced by Erica Luttrell. This version is a member of the Legion of Doom.
- The Barbara Minerva incarnation of Cheetah appears in the Batman Unlimited series, voiced by Laura Bailey.
- The Barbara Minerva incarnation of Cheetah appears in Lego DC Comics Super Heroes: Justice League – Attack of the Legion of Doom, voiced by Cree Summer. This version is a member of the Legion of Doom.
- The Barbara Minerva incarnation of Cheetah appears in films set in the DC Animated Movie Universe (DCAMU), voiced by Kimberly Brooks. This version is a member of the Legion of Doom, Villainy Inc., and the Suicide Squad. In Justice League Dark: Apokolips War, Minerva is killed during an assault on a LexCorp building.
- The Barbara Minerva incarnation of Cheetah appears in Injustice.
- The Barbara Minerva incarnation of Cheetah appears in Wonder Woman 1984, portrayed by Kristen Wiig. Similar to her DC Rebirth backstory, this version is initially a friend and colleague of Diana Prince who is ignored and shunned for her unattractive appearance and poor social skills. After wishing to be just like Prince while holding a magical artifact called the "Dreamstone", Minerva develops a more confident personality, her appearance becomes more conventionally attractive, and she develops superhuman physical abilities. However, she also becomes more mean-spirited and arrogant, which leads to her turning on Prince. Impressed, Maxwell Lord offers her more power. Wishing to become an "apex predator", he bestows upon her a cheetah-like appearance and superhuman abilities with the bloodlust and rage to match. However, Prince eventually defeats Minerva before confronting Lord. After convincing him to renounce his wish, Minerva loses her powers and reverts to her human form.
- The Barbara Minerva incarnation of Cheetah appears in Batman: Death in the Family. While being arrested by the police, she is killed by Jason Todd as either Hush or Red Robin depending on the viewer's choices.
- The Barbara Minerva incarnation of Cheetah appears in Catwoman: Hunted, voiced by Kirby Howell-Baptiste. This version is a member of Leviathan and figurehead for Talia al Ghul.
- The Barbara Minerva incarnation of Cheetah makes a non-speaking appearance in Teen Titans Go! & DC Super Hero Girls: Mayhem in the Multiverse as a member of the Legion of Doom.
- The Barbara Minerva incarnation of Cheetah appears in Justice League: Crisis on Infinite Earths, voiced by Cynthia McWilliams.

=== Video games ===
- The Barbara Minerva incarnation of Cheetah appears as a playable character in Justice League Task Force.
- The Barbara Minerva incarnation of Cheetah appears in DC Universe Online, voiced by Adriene Mishler. In the hero campaign, she serves as a boss. In the villain campaign, she is a vendor in the Hall of Doom's magic wing.
- The Barbara Minerva incarnation of Cheetah appears as a boss and mini-boss in Justice League: Injustice for All.
- The Barbara Minerva, Priscilla Rich, and Sebastian Ballesteros incarnations of Cheetah appear as character summons in Scribblenauts Unmasked: A DC Comics Adventure, with Minerva additionally appearing as a boss.
- The Barbara Minerva incarnation of Cheetah, based on her New 52 appearance, appears as an unlockable costume in LittleBigPlanet 2 via the "DC Comics Premium Level Pack" DLC.
- The Barbara Minerva incarnation of Cheetah appears as a playable character in DC Legends.
- The Barbara Minerva incarnation of Cheetah appears as a playable character in DC Unchained.
- The Barbara Minerva incarnation of Cheetah appears as a playable character in Lego Batman 3: Beyond Gotham. This version is a member of the Legion of Doom.
- The Barbara Minerva incarnation of Cheetah, based on her New 52 counterpart, appears as a playable character in Injustice 2, voiced again by Erica Luttrell. This version is a member of Gorilla Grodd's "Society".
- The Barbara Minerva incarnation of Cheetah appears as a playable character in Lego DC Super-Villains, voiced again by Erica Luttrell. This version is a member of the Legion of Doom.

=== Books ===
- An unidentified incarnation of Cheetah appears in Attack of the Cheetah and The Fastest Pet on Earth, both by Jane B. Mason and published by Capstone as part of their DC Super Heroes line of illustrated children's books. Similarly to the Priscilla Rich incarnation, this version has a pet cheetah named Chauncey.
- An unidentified incarnation of Cheetah appears in the Capstone children's book, Cheetah and the Purrfect Crime, by Laurie S. Sutton.

=== Miscellaneous ===
- The Priscilla Rich incarnation of Cheetah appears in the first two issues of the non-canonical Super Friends comic book series. She along with the Penguin, Toyman, Poison Ivy, and the Human Flying Fish mentor junior criminals, with Rich being partnered with a teenage girl named Kitten.
- The Deborah Domaine incarnation of Cheetah appears in the 1982 Wonder Woman audiobook story "Cheetah on the Prowl", voiced by Sonia Manzano.
- The Priscilla Rich incarnation of Cheetah appears in a flashback in Teen Titans Go! #54.
- The Priscilla Rich incarnation of Cheetah appears in the Batman: The Brave and the Bold tie-in comic book series.
- The Injustice incarnation of Barbara Minerva / Cheetah makes a minor appearance in the Injustice: Gods Among Us prequel comic.
- The Priscilla Rich and Barbara Minerva incarnations of Cheetah both appear in Wonder Woman '77. The former appears in issue #6 as an illusion created by Doctor Psycho, while the latter makes recurring appearances later in the series after being empowered by Mafdet.
- The Priscilla Rich incarnation of Cheetah appears in Lego's DC Super Heroes minifigure theme.

== Cultural impact and legacy ==
Ever since her first appearance, Cheetah has been referred as the most iconic Wonder Woman villain. Abraham Josephine Riesman of The Vulture referred to her as a Big Deal stating "she's one of the all-time most iconic Wonder Woman foes. She's ubiquitous and colorful enough to possibly be defined as Diana's Joker. Case in point: When the legendary Challenge of the Super Friends DC cartoon aired back in the day, WW's counterpart on the Legion of Doom was Cheetah, confirming her archnemesis status". Sarah Moran of Screen Rant stated "Ares isn't Diana's most iconic villain, he isn't her Joker or Lex Luthor. That would be Cheetah, Rachel Leishman of The Mary Sue wrote, "Minerva is a fun villain in general because she often connects with people like Lex Luthor or the Joker to come after our heroes, and while neither of them are in 1984, it could set up future connections between the Superman and Batman villains and Cheetah as DC's interconnected movie universe finds its path forward. The more I look at Wiig as Cheetah, though, the more I'm concerned that I'm going to end up really loving her as the villain".

== See also ==
- List of Wonder Woman enemies
