= Doctor Cyber =

- Doctor Cyber in Wonder Woman (vol. 5) #19 (2017). Art by Liam Sharp.

Publication information
- Publisher: DC Comics
- First appearance: Wonder Woman (vol. 1) #179 (November–December 1968)
- Created by: Dennis O'Neil; Mike Sekowsky; Dick Giordano

In-story information
- Alter ego: Cylvia Anita Cyber; Dr. Adrianna Anderson
- Team affiliations: Secret Society of Super Villains; Godwatch
- Abilities: Previously (via body armor): Superhuman strength and durability Energy blasts Energy absorption Invisibility; Currently: Artificial intelligence physiology, able to hijack and control technology

Doctor Cyber is a fictional character appearing in DC Comics publications and related media, commonly as a recurring adversary of the superhero Wonder Woman. She first appeared late in the Silver Age of Comics in 1968's Wonder Woman (volume 1) #179, written by Dennis O'Neil and illustrated by Mike Sekowsky and Dick Giordano.

In her Silver Age appearances, Dr. Cyber was the brilliant head of a vast global criminal network. Beautiful, vain and possibly British or of Asian descent (or both), she initially blended aspects of the femme fatale and dragon lady character tropes. Subsequent Bronze Age appearances incorporated science fiction elements: after her face was disfigured in an accident, Dr. Cyber donned an eerie muzzle-mask and a technologically advanced exoskeleton. These cybernetic enhancements increased her physical strength, and gave her the ability to absorb energy, as well as to redirect it by firing blasts from her hands. Despite the resulting upgrades to her power, Dr. Cyber's disfigurement also wrought a mounting emotional instability: she became obsessed with recapturing her beauty by transferring her mind into Wonder Woman's body, a project she attempted several times with the help of her operative Doctor Moon.

After DC Comics rebooted its continuity in 1985 (a publication event known as the Crisis on Infinite Earths), Wonder Woman, her supporting cast and foes were re-imagined. Though originally absent from this revised mythos, Doctor Cyber would be reintroduced to the DC Comics canon in 2002, not in a Wonder Woman comic, but in issue #1 of Kurt Busiek and Tom Gummett's The Power Company, as the first arch-nemesis of the eponymous super-team. In DC's post-Rebirth era, the character would be reimagined as a powerful artificial intelligence with the memory and blithe personality of Dr. Adrianna Anderson, the deceased research and business partner of Wonder Woman's adversary Veronica Cale.

== Fictional character biography ==
=== Pre-Crisis ===
The Silver Age Doctor Cyber debuts her muzzle mask in Wonder Woman (vol. 1) #200 (May 1972); art by Dick Giordano and Mike Esposito.

Doctor Cyber is the leader of a global criminal network around the same time when Wonder Woman had relinquished her powers when her fellow Amazons retreated into another dimension. Prior to Cyber's first encounter with the depowered Amazon, her henchmen plunder I Ching's monastery and kill its monks. Colonel Steve Trevor unsuccessfully attempted to infiltrate Cyber's network, but learned of their plot: to create chaos within the US government by sending bombs inside toys to the children of Congressmen. This plot was actually a ruse to divert attention from a London jewel heist, foiled by Wonder Woman and Ching. Doctor Cyber escaped only to resurface in Hong Kong several weeks later.

In Hong Kong, Doctor Cyber's plan was to destroy the city and blackmail the world with a series of devices that could create earthquakes. Cyber lured the non-powered Diana Prince to the Asian city hoping to entice her into joining the organization, which she steadfastly refused. Soon afterward, an attack by the rival Tiger Tong gang resulted in an urn of hot coals spilling onto Cyber's face. The villainess was evacuated to a secret hospital outside of Hong Kong, swearing revenge on Diana Prince for her disfigurement. Prince stopped the earthquake plot and Cyber was believed killed when her final earthquake device exploded.

When Diana Prince teamed up with private detective Jonny Double to stop an organization called the Tribunal, she discovered that Doctor Cyber had survived their previous encounter. Cyber had created the Tribunal to find a suitable woman to transplant her brain and replace her disfigured body. After Prince's capture, Cyber unsuccessfully attempted to have her brain transplanted into Diana by Doctor Moon. During this encounter, Cyber was accidentally impaled by a scalpel and believed killed once again.

On an assignment at a Catskill Mountain resort as Diana Prince, Wonder Woman again discovered that Doctor Cyber had cheated death. While investigating a number of murders at the resort, Cyber battled Wonder Woman after an unsuccessful attempt to graft the Amazon's face onto her own. The ensuing melée ended with Cyber seemingly falling to her death from atop a ski lift.

The Bronze Age Doctor Cyber in Wonder Woman (vol. 1) #287 (January 1982); art by Don Heck, Romeo Tanghal and Carl Gafford.

Doctor Cyber laid low for several months before capturing Wonder Girl in another attempt to capture Wonder Woman for a brain transplant. Wonder Woman agreed to trade her life for her adopted sister, but both were rescued by the Teen Titans. Cyber and her partner, Dr. Moon, were finally captured.

It is unknown if Doctor Cyber was released or escaped from custody, but she disguised herself as Diana Prince, infiltrated the Pentagon, and stole the launch codes to America's nuclear missiles. Wonder Woman averted the attempted nuclear war, but Cyber was killed attempting to flee from her and Steve Trevor (disguised as the god Eros) when her rocket sled crashed into the side of a cliff.

In Crisis on Infinite Earths, Brainiac recruits a past version of Cyber and sends her and several other villains to conquer Earth-S.

=== Post-Crisis ===
The Post-Crisis Doctor Cyber in The Power Company #1 (February 2002); art by Tom Grummett.

The second Doctor Cyber first appeared, chronologically, in post-Crisis continuity in The Power Company #1 (February 2002). Cyber, together with several other scientific geniuses and robotic beings (Automan, Brainstorm, Emil Hamilton, Ford, and Rosie the Riveter), was part of the composite cybernetic being Enginehead..

In Infinite Crisis, Doctor Cyber joins Alexander Luthor Jr.'s Secret Society of Super Villains.

=== DC Rebirth ===
In DC Rebirth, Doctor Cyber is Adrianna Anderson, a research scientist for Empire Industries and a friend of its CEO Veronica Cale. Soon after Diana left Themyscira and returned Steve Trevor to the United States, Cale's daughter Isadore was kidnapped by the gods Deimos and Phobos. To reclaim her soul, the twin gods order Cale and Anderson to use the experimental Cyberwalker system to find the location of Themyscira from Wonder Woman. Anderson immediately volunteers to use the Cyberwalker suit out of fear of losing her only friend. Connected to the Cyberwalker, Anderson battles Wonder Woman, but the Cyberwalker suit malfunctions with Anderson's mind trapped inside. Despite Cale's efforts, Anderson dies.

Over a year later, Veronica Cale creates an artificial construct of Anderson using what was left of her neural map in the Cyberwalker system. After learning that her physical body had died, Anderson takes the name Doctor Cyber. Cale recruits Doctor Cyber into helping her get her daughter back.

== Powers and abilities ==
The first Doctor Cyber had no powers but wore an armored suit that allowed her to physically fight Wonder Woman on near-equal terms. The suit enhanced her strength and endurance and also allowed her to redirect energy when fired at the suit. She also used a variety of weaponry that included laser pistols, mind control serum, an invisibility screen, rocket sleds, and myriad robot assassins. After her disfigurement she often used plain and unattractive women as henchmen so as not to be reminded of her lost beauty.

The second Doctor Cyber also wore an armored suit, but while its full abilities and limitations are as yet unknown, in keeping with her name they are more implicitly cybernetic in nature. As her limbs were able to stretch to impossible lengths it does seem that she is a cyborg and not merely a person in armor.

Post-Rebirth, Adrianna Anderson developed a device that would enable her to remotely interface with mechanical components. This automated robotics system could physically interface with the neurological mechanics of the brain from a world away, but ran the risk of subsuming a human mind who piloted it in the virtual reality.

After her body died, Veronica Cale uploaded what was left of Anderson's neural imprint from the C.Y.B.E.R system into a computer interface, resurrecting her as an artificial intelligence. She uses metallic spheres to emit holograms of her physical appearance, often changing them at will. Cyber has access to the majority of technology in the world, able to transfer into and hack digitized equipment instantaneously.

== Other versions ==
Doctor Cyber appears in the anthology series Wonder Woman: Black & Gold.

== In other media ==
=== Television ===
Doctor Cyber makes minor non-speaking appearances in Justice League Unlimited as a member of Gorilla Grodd's Secret Society before being killed by Darkseid.

=== Film ===
Doctor Cyber appears in Wonder Woman: Bloodlines, voiced by Mozhan Marnò. This version is an artificial intelligence and co-leader of Villainy Inc. before being killed by Medusa.

=== Video games ===
Doctor Cyber appears as a character summon in Scribblenauts Unmasked: A DC Comics Adventure.

=== Miscellaneous ===
- Doctor Cyber appears in Batman: The Brave and the Bold #4.
- Doctor Cyber appears in DC Super Friends #24.
- Gloria Marquez, who previously appeared in Wonder Woman (1975), is revealed to be Doctor Cyber in Wonder Woman '77 Meets The Bionic Woman.

== See also ==
- List of Wonder Woman enemies
