= Greg Rucka bibliography =

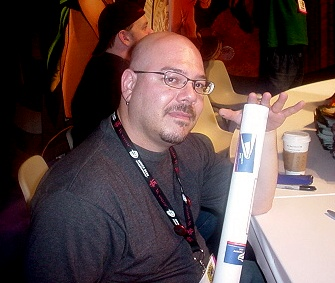
- Rucka in 2004
- Active period: 1996–present

Publishers
- Oni Press: 1998–present
- DC Comics: 1998–present
- Marvel Comics: 2001–present
- Image Comics: 2001–present

Greg Rucka is an American writer known for the series of novels starring his character Atticus Kodiak, the creator-owned comic book series Whiteout, Queen & Country, Stumptown and Lazarus, as well as lengthy runs on such titles as Detective Comics, Wonder Woman, Elektra and Wolverine. Rucka has written a substantial amount of supplemental material for a number of DC Comics' line-wide and inter-title crossovers, including "No Man's Land", "Infinite Crisis" and "New Krypton". Rucka has also co-created, along with writer Ed Brubaker and artist Michael Lark, the acclaimed comic book series Gotham Central, which takes the perspective of ordinary policemen working in Gotham City.

== Novels ==
=== Atticus Kodiak ===
Series of novels starring the professional bodyguard Atticus Kodiak, including:

- Keeper (hc, 275 pages, Bantam Books, 1996, ISBN 0-553-10244-3; sc, 332 pages, 1997, ISBN 0-553-57428-0)
- Finder (hc, 288 pages, Bantam Books, 1997, ISBN 0-553-10098-X; sc, 352 pages, 1998, ISBN 0-553-57429-9)
- Smoker (hc, 320 pages, Bantam Books, 1998, ISBN 0-553-10716-X; sc, 432 pages, 1999, ISBN 0-553-57829-4)
- Shooting at Midnight (hc, 368 pages, Bantam Books, 1999, ISBN 0-553-10720-8; sc, 400 pages, 2000, ISBN 0-553-57827-8)
- Critical Space (hc, 440 pages, Bantam Books, 2002, ISBN 0-7862-3836-4; sc, 528 pages, 2003, ISBN 0-553-58179-1)
- Patriot Acts (hc, 352 pages, Bantam Books, 2007, ISBN 0-553-80473-1; sc, 416 pages, 2008, ISBN 0-553-58899-0)
- Walking Dead (hc, 320 pages, Bantam Books, 2009, ISBN 0-553-80474-X; sc, 400 pages, 2010, ISBN 0-553-58900-8)

=== Other early work ===
Novelizations, original stories within established franchises and other work, including:

- Batman: No Man's Land (hc, 448 pages, Pocket Books, 2000, ISBN 0-671-03828-1)
- Grendel: Past Prime (sc, 208 pages, Dark Horse Books, 2000, ISBN 1-56971-398-7)
- Buffy the Vampire Slayer: Tales of the Slayer Volume 1: "A Good Run" (anthology sc, 280 pages, Simon Spotlight, 2001, ISBN 0-7434-0045-3)
- A Fistful of Rain (hc, 320 pages, Bantam Books, 2003, ISBN 0-553-80135-X; sc, 400 pages, 2004, ISBN 0-553-58182-1)

=== Queen & Country ===
Series of novels set in the world of Rucka's comic book series Queen & Country, including:

- A Gentleman's Game (hc, 352 pages, Bantam Books, 2004, ISBN 0-553-80276-3; sc, 528 pages, 2005, ISBN 0-553-58492-8)
- Private Wars (hc, 432 pages, Bantam Books, 2005, ISBN 0-553-80277-1; sc, 544 pages, 2006, ISBN 0-553-58493-6)
- The Last Run (hc, 272 pages, Bantam Books, 2010, ISBN 0-553-80475-8; sc, 352 pages, 2011, ISBN 0-553-58901-6)

=== Perfect Dark ===
Series of novels set in the world of the Perfect Dark video game, including:

- Perfect Dark: Initial Vector (sc, 352 pages, Tor Books, 2005, ISBN 0-7653-1571-8)
- Perfect Dark: Second Front (sc, 368 pages, Tor Books, 2007, ISBN 0-7653-1572-6)

=== Jad Bell ===
Series of novels starring the ex-Delta Force operative Jad Bell, including:

- Alpha (hc, 304 pages, Mulholland Books, 2012, ISBN 0-316-18228-1; sc, 368 pages, 2015, ISBN 0-316-18227-3)
- Bravo (hc, 304 pages, Mulholland Books, 2014, ISBN 0-316-18230-3; sc, 368 pages, 2015, ISBN 0-316-18229-X)

=== Star Wars ===
Series of young adult novels set in the current canon of Star Wars, including:

- Star Wars: Smuggler's Run (hc, 192 pages, Lucasfilm Press, 2015, ISBN 1-4847-2495-X)
- Star Wars: Before the Awakening (hc, 224 pages, Lucasfilm Press, 2015, ISBN 1-4847-2822-X)
- Star Wars: Guardians of the Whills (hc, 240 pages, Lucasfilm Press, 2017, ISBN 1-4847-8081-7)

== Comics ==
=== Oni Press ===
Titles published by Oni Press include:

- Whiteout (with Steve Lieber):
  - Whiteout Compendium (tpb, 240 pages, 2017, ISBN 1-62010-448-2) collects:
    - Whiteout #1–4 (1998) also collected as Whiteout (tpb, 128 pages, 1999, ISBN 0-9667127-1-4)
    - Whiteout: Melt #1–4 (1999–2000) also collected as Whiteout: Melt (tpb, 120 pages, 2000, ISBN 1-929998-03-1)
  - Whiteout: Night (initially announced for late 2007 as Whiteout: Thaw; reportedly moved closer to the release of the film adaptation)
    - In 2009, Lieber stated there was only one completed issue so far. In a 2012 interview, Rucka mentioned "one and a half" completed issues.
  - Oni Press Color Special '00: "Weenout" (a Barry Ween/Whiteout crossover co-written by Rucka and Judd Winick, art by Winick, anthology, 2000)
- Queen & Country:
  - The Definitive Edition Volume 1 (tpb, 376 pages, 2007, ISBN 1-932664-87-4) collects:
    - Oni Press Color Special '01: "Broken Ground" (with Stan Sakai, anthology, 2001)
    - "Operation: Broken Ground" (with Steve Rolston, in #1–4, 2001)
    - "Operation: Morningstar" (with Brian Hurtt, in #5–7, 2002)
    - "Operation: Crystal Ball" (with Leandro Fernández, in #8–12, 2002)
  - The Definitive Edition Volume 2 (tpb, 344 pages, 2008, ISBN 1-932664-89-0) collects:
    - "Operation: Blackwall" (with Jason Shawn Alexander, in #13–15, 2003)
    - "Operation: Stormfront" (with Carla Speed McNeil, in #16–20, 2003)
    - "Operation: Dandelion" (with Mike Hawthorne, in #21–24, 2003–2004)
  - The Definitive Edition Volume 3 (tpb, 408 pages, 2008, ISBN 1-932664-96-3) collects:
    - "Untitled" (with Steve Rolston, in #25, 2004)
    - "Operation: Saddlebags" (with Mike Norton, in #26–28, 2004)
    - "Operation: Red Panda" (with Chris Samnee, in #29–32, 2006–2007)
  - The Definitive Edition Volume 4 (tpb, 296 pages, 2009, ISBN 1-934964-13-1) collects:
    - Queen & Country: Declassified #1–3 (with Brian Hurtt, 2002–2003)
    - Queen & Country: Declassified vol. 2 #1–3 (with Rick Burchett, 2005–2006)
    - Queen & Country: Declassified vol. 3 #1–3 (written by Antony Johnston, drawn by Christopher Mitten, 2005)
- Everest: Facing the Goddess (with Scott Morse, 12-issue maxi-series initially announced for August 2004)
  - A 7-page sketch preview was published in the Free Comic Book Day 2004: Love Fights special.
  - Rucka has stated he's still interested in producing the series as recently as December 2011.
- Stumptown:
  - Stumptown #1–4 (with Matthew Southworth, 2009–2010) collected as Stumptown: The Case of the Girl Who Took Her Shampoo but Left Her Mini (hc, 144 pages, 2011, ISBN 1-934964-37-9; tpb, 2017, ISBN 1-62010-440-7)
  - Stumptown vol. 2 #1–5 (with Matthew Southworth, 2012–2013) collected as Stumptown: The Case of the Baby in the Velvet Case (hc, 152 pages, 2013, ISBN 1-934964-89-1; tpb, 2018, ISBN 1-62010-480-6)
  - Stumptown vol. 3 (with Justin Greenwood, 2014–2016) collected as:
    - The Case of the King of Clubs (collects #1–5, hc, 144 pages, 2015, ISBN 1-62010-201-3; tpb, 2018, ISBN 1-62010-539-X)
    - The Case of a Cup of Joe (collects #6–10, hc, 152 pages, 2016, ISBN 1-62010-301-X; tpb, 2019, ISBN 1-62010-579-9)

=== DC Comics ===
Titles published by DC Comics include:

- Batman:
  - The Batman Chronicles (anthology):
    - "Random Encounters" (with Sal Buscema, in #14, 1998) collected in Batman: Road to No Man's Land Volume 1 (tpb, 288 pages, 2015, ISBN 1-4012-5827-1)
    - "An Answer in the Rubble" (with Roger Cruz, in #15, 1998) collected in Batman: Road to No Man's Land Volume 2 (tpb, 200 pages, 2016, ISBN 1-4012-6063-2)
  - Batman: No Man's Land:
    - Volume 1 (tpb, 544 pages, 2011, ISBN 1-4012-3228-0) includes:
      - Batman #565 + Detective Comics #732: "Mosaic" (with Frank Teran, 1999)
      - The Batman Chronicles #16: "Two Down" (with Jason Pearson, anthology, 1999)
      - Batman: Legends of the Dark Knight #118: "Balance" (with Jason Pearson, 1999)
    - Volume 2 (tpb, 512 pages, 2012, ISBN 1-4012-3380-5) includes:
      - Batman: Legends of the Dark Knight #119 + Batman: Shadow of the Bat #87: "Claim Jumping" (with Mike Deodato, Jr., 1999)
      - Batman: Legends of the Dark Knight #120: "Assembly" (with Mike Deodato, Jr., 1999)
      - Batman: Shadow of the Bat #88 + Batman #568 + Detective Comics #735: "Fruit of the Earth" (with Dan Jurgens, 1999)
    - Secret Origins of Super-Villains 80-Page Giant: "Echoes Past" (with Rick Burchett, anthology one-shot, 1999)
    - Volume 4 (tpb, 552 pages, 2012, ISBN 1-4012-3564-6) includes:
      - Batman #572 + Detective Comics #739: "Jurisprudence" (with Damion Scott, 1999)
      - Batman: Legends of the Dark Knight #125: "Falling Back" (with Rick Burchett, 1999)
      - Batman: Shadow of the Bat #93: "Assembly Redux" (with Paul Ryan, 1999)
      - Batman: No Man's Land #0: "Ground Zero" (co-written by Rucka and Jordan B. Gorfinkel, art by Greg Land, 1999)
      - Batman #573 + Detective Comics #740: "Shellgame" (with Sergio Cariello, 1999)
      - Batman: Legends of the Dark Knight #126 + Batman #574 + Detective Comics #741: "Endgame" (co-written by Rucka and Devin K. Grayson, art by Dale Eaglesham and Damion Scott, 1999)
      - Batman: Shadow of the Bat #94: "Endgame (epilogue): Days of Auld Lang Syne" (with Pablo Raimondi, 1999)
  - Detective Comics (with Shawn Martinbrough, John Watkiss (#745–746), Will Rosado (#747), Phil Hester (#748–749), Brad Rader + Steve Mannion (#753), Koi Turnbull (#756), Rick Burchett (#757, 762, 765, 775), Scott McDaniel (#766), Steve Lieber (#767–771, 773–774) and Sergio Cariello (#772), 2000–2002; with J. H. Williams III (#854–860), Jock (#861–863) and Scott Kolins (#863), 2009–2010) collected as:
    - Batman: New Gotham Volume 1 (collects #742–753, tpb, 336 pages, 2017, ISBN 1-4012-6367-4)
    - Batman: New Gotham Volume 2 (collects #755–765, tpb, 296 pages, 2018, ISBN 1-4012-7794-2)
    - Batman: Bruce Wayne — Murderer? (includes #766–770, tpb, 624 pages, 2014, ISBN 1-4012-4683-4)
      - Includes the Batman: The 10-Cent Adventure one-shot (written by Rucka, art by Rick Burchett, 2002)
    - Batman: Bruce Wayne — Fugitive (includes #771–775, tpb, 432 pages, 2014, ISBN 1-4012-4682-6)
    - Batwoman by Greg Rucka and J. H. Williams III (collects #854–863, tpb, 256 pages, 2017, ISBN 1-4012-7413-7)
  - Batman/Huntress: Cry for Blood #1–6 (with Rick Burchett, 2000) collected as Batman/Huntress: Cry for Blood (tpb, 144 pages, 2002, ISBN 1-56389-801-2)
  - Batman: Turning Points #1 (with Steve Lieber) and #5 (with Paul Pope, 2001) collected in Batman: Turning Points (tpb, 128 pages, 2007, ISBN 1-4012-1360-X)
  - Batman: Officer Down (tpb, 168 pages, 2001, ISBN 1-56389-787-3) includes:
    - Batman #587: "Part One: These are Your Rights" (with Rick Burchett, 2001)
    - Batman: Gotham Knights #13: "Part Seven: The End" (with Rick Burchett, 2001)
  - Gotham Central (with Michael Lark, Greg Scott (#17–18), Stefano Gaudiano (#28–31), Steve Lieber (#32 and 37) and Kano, 2003–2006) collected as:
    - Issues #1–2, 12–15 and 33–36 are co-written by Rucka and Ed Brubaker.
      - In the Line of Duty (includes #1–2 and 6–10, hc, 240 pages, 2008, ISBN 1-4012-1923-3; tpb, 2011, ISBN 1-4012-2037-1)
      - Jokers and Madmen (includes #12–15 and 17–18, hc, 288 pages, 2009, ISBN 1-4012-2521-7; tpb, 2011, ISBN 1-4012-2543-8)
      - On the Freak Beat (includes #23–25 and 28–31, hc, 224 pages, 2010, ISBN 1-4012-2754-6; tpb, 2011, ISBN 1-4012-3232-9)
      - Corrigan (collects #32–40, hc, 224 pages, 2011, ISBN 1-4012-3003-2; tpb, 2012, ISBN 1-4012-3194-2)
      - Omnibus (includes #1–2, 6–10, 12–15, 17–18, 23–25, 28–40, hc, 957 pages, 2016, ISBN 1-4012-6192-2)
  - Batman: Death and the Maidens (tpb, 224 pages, 2004, ISBN 1-4012-0234-9; hc, 240 pages, 2017, ISBN 1-4012-6593-6) collects:
    - Detective Comics #783: "Death and the Maidens: Prologue" (with Klaus Janson, co-feature, 2003)
    - Batman: Death and the Maidens #1–9 (with Klaus Janson, 2003–2004)
  - DCU Infinite Holiday Special: "Lights" (with Christian Alamy, anthology one-shot, 2007)
  - Detective Comics #1027: "Rookie" (with Eduardo Risso, co-feature, 2020)
- Flinch #8: "Guts" (with James Romberger, anthology, Vertigo, 1999) collected in Flinch Book One (tpb, 192 pages, 2015, ISBN 1-4012-5812-3)
- Weird War Tales Special: "Esprit de Corps" (with Danijel Žeželj, anthology one-shot, Vertigo, 2000)
- Weird Western Tales vol. 2 #1: "This Gun for Hire" (with Rick Burchett, anthology, Vertigo, 2001)
- Superman:
  - Superman: President Lex (tpb, 240 pages, 2003, ISBN 1-56389-974-4) includes:
    - President Luthor Secret Files & Origins (co-features in one-shot, 2001):
      - "The Why" (with Matthew Clark)
      - "Most Suitable Person" (with Dale Eaglesham)
    - Superman: Lex 2000: "One or the Other" (with Dwayne Turner, co-feature in one-shot, 2000)
  - Adventures of Superman (with Matthew Clark, Renato Guedes, Paul Pelletier (#632), Rags Morales (#636) and Karl Kerschl, 2004–2006) collected as:
    - Superman: Unconventional Warfare (collects #627–632 and co-features from #625–626, tpb, 160 pages, 2005, ISBN 1-4012-0449-X)
    - Superman: That Healing Touch (collects #633–638, tpb, 168 pages, 2005, ISBN 1-4012-0453-8)
    - Superman: Ruin Revealed (collects #640–641 and 644–647, tpb, 144 pages, 2006, ISBN 1-4012-0920-3)
      - Issues #642–643 are collected in Superman: Sacrifice (tpb, 192 pages, 2006, ISBN 1-4012-0919-X)
      - Issues #644–645 and 647 are scripted by Nunzio DeFilippis and Christina Weir from Rucka's plots.
      - Issue #648, also scripted by DeFilippis and Weir from a story by Rucka, remains uncollected.
  - Superman Secret Files 2004: "Pipolar Reorder" (with Jon Bogdanove, co-feature in one-shot, 2004)
  - Supergirl vol. 4 #6: "Candor, Part One" (with Ed Benes, 2006) collected in Supergirl: The Girl of Steel (tpb, 304 pages, 2016, ISBN 1-4012-6093-4)
    - Rucka joined the series as the new regular writer, but left after one full issue. Issue #7 is scripted by Joe Kelly from Rucka's plot for "Candor".
    - Solicitations for Rucka-written issues #7 and 8 (resolicited twice before Kelly was named as the new writer) are still available online.
  - Action Comics (with Eddy Barrows, Sidney Teles (#876–877), Diego Olmos (#878–879), Julian López (#880) and Pere Pérez, 2009–2010) collected as:
    - Superman: Nightwing and Flamebird Volume 1 (collects #875–879 and Annual #12, hc, 168 pages, 2010, ISBN 1-4012-2638-8; tpb, 2011, ISBN 1-4012-2639-6)
    - Superman: Codename Patriot (includes #880, hc, 144 pages, 2010, ISBN 1-4012-2658-2; tpb, 2011, ISBN 1-4012-2657-4)
      - Issue #880 is co-written by Rucka and James Robinson.
    - Supergirl: The Hunt for Reactron (includes #881–882 and Supergirl vol. 4 #45–46, tpb, 304 pages, 2019, ISBN 1-4012-8574-0)
      - Includes the "Blood-Sisters" short story (co-written by Rucka and Sterling Gates, art by Fernando Dagnino) from Superman Secret Files 2009 (one-shot, 2009)
      - All issues of "The Hunt for Reactron" crossover — Action Comics #881–882 and Supergirl vol. 4 #45–46 — are co-written by Rucka and Sterling Gates.
    - Superman: Nightwing and Flamebird Volume 2 (collects #883–889, hc, 208 pages, 2011, ISBN 1-4012-2939-5; tpb, 2011, ISBN 1-4012-2940-9)
      - Issues #883–889 are co-written by Rucka and Eric Trautmann.
  - Superman: World of New Krypton (co-written by Rucka and James Robinson, art by Pete Woods, 2009–2010) collected as:
    - Superman: New Krypton Volume 3 (collects #1–5, hc, 144 pages, 2010, ISBN 1-4012-2636-1; tpb, 2011, ISBN 1-4012-2637-X)
    - Superman: New Krypton Volume 4 (collects #6–12, hc, 192 pages, 2010, ISBN 1-4012-2774-0; tpb, 2011, ISBN 1-4012-2775-9)
  - Superman Secret Files 2009: "Vigil" (with Pere Pérez, co-feature in one-shot, 2009)
  - Superman: Heroes (co-written by Rucka, Brian Michael Bendis and Matt Fraction, art by various artists, one-shot, 2020) collected in Superman: The Truth Revealed (hc, 192 pages, 2020, ISBN 1-4012-9969-5; tpb, 2021, ISBN 1-77950-571-X)
- Wonder Woman:
  - Wonder Woman: The Hiketeia (with J. G. Jones, graphic novel, hc, 96 pages, 2002, ISBN 1-56389-898-5; sc, 2003, ISBN 1-56389-914-0)
  - Wonder Woman vol. 2 (with Drew Johnson, Shane Davis (#201), Stephen Sadowski (#202), Sean Phillips (#211), James Raiz (#212–213), Rags Morales, Ron Randall (#218), David López (#220) and Cliff Richards, 2003–2006) collected as:
    - Wonder Woman by Greg Rucka Volume 1 (collects #195–205, tpb, 392 pages, 2016, ISBN 1-4012-6332-1)
    - Wonder Woman by Greg Rucka Volume 2 (collects #206–217, tpb, 320 pages, 2017, ISBN 1-4012-7117-0)
    - Wonder Woman by Greg Rucka Volume 3 (collects #218–226, tpb, 216 pages, 2019, ISBN 1-4012-9342-5)
      - Includes the 3-issue limited series Blackest Night: Wonder Woman (written by Rucka, art by Nicola Scott, 2010)
  - Wonder Woman: Earth One (with J. H. Williams III, unproduced graphic novel — the project was apparently "promised" to Rucka by Dan Didio before being given to Grant Morrison)
  - Wonder Woman vol. 5 (with Liam Sharp, Nicola Scott, Bilquis Evely, Renato Guedes (#13) and Mirka Andolfo (#22), 2016–2017) collected as:
    - Wonder Woman Rebirth: The Deluxe Edition Book One (collects #1–14, hc, 304 pages, 2017, ISBN 1-4012-7678-4)
      - Includes the Wonder Woman: Rebirth one-shot (written by Rucka, art by Matthew Clark, 2016)
    - Wonder Woman Rebirth: The Deluxe Edition Book Two (collects the #15–25 and Annual #1, hc, 296 pages, 2018, ISBN 1-4012-8093-5)
      - Includes the "Solstice" short story (art by Bilquis Evely) from DC Universe Holiday Special (one-shot, 2018)
  - Wonder Woman 75th Anniversary Special: "Wonder Woman in Conversation" (with Liam Sharp, anthology, 2016)
  - Wonder Woman #750: "Never Change" (with Nicola Scott, co-feature, 2020) collected in Wonder Woman: The Four Horsewomen (tpb, 336 pages, 2021, ISBN 1-77950-910-3)
- Infinite Crisis Omnibus (hc, 1,152 pages, 2012, ISBN 1-4012-3502-6) includes:
  - Countdown to Infinite Crisis (co-written by Rucka, Judd Winick and Geoff Johns, art by Rags Morales, Ed Benes, Jesús Saiz, Ivan Reis and Phil Jimenez, one-shot, 2005)
  - The OMAC Project #1–6 (with Jesús Saíz and Cliff Richards, 2005) also collected as The OMAC Project (tpb, 256 pages, 2005, ISBN 1-4012-0837-1)
  - Infinite Crisis Special: The OMAC Project (with Jesús Saíz, 2006) also collected in Infinite Crisis Companion (tpb, 168 pages, 2006, ISBN 1-4012-0922-X)
- 52 (co-written by Rucka, Geoff Johns, Grant Morrison and Mark Waid, art by various artists from layouts by Keith Giffen, 2006–2007) collected as:
  - Volume 1 (collects #1–13, tpb, 304 pages, 2007, ISBN 1-4012-1353-7)
  - Volume 2 (collects #14–26, tpb, 304 pages, 2007, ISBN 1-4012-1364-2)
  - Volume 3 (collects #27–39, tpb, 304 pages, 2007, ISBN 1-4012-1443-6)
  - Volume 4 (collects #40–52, tpb, 326 pages, 2007, ISBN 1-4012-1486-X)
  - Omnibus (collects #1–52, hc, 1,216 pages, 2012, ISBN 1-4012-3556-5)
- Checkmate vol. 2 (with Jesús Saíz, Cliff Richards, Steve Scott (#11–12), Joe Bennett and Chris Samnee (#17, 21–22), 2006–2008) collected as:
  - Checkmate by Greg Rucka Book One (collects #1–12, tpb, 296 pages, 2017, ISBN 1-4012-6595-2)
    - Issues #6–7 and 11–12 are co-written by Rucka with Nunzio DeFilippis and Christina Weir.
  - Checkmate by Greg Rucka Book Two (collects #13–25 and The Outsiders vol. 3 #47–49, tpb, 392 pages, 2018, ISBN 1-4012-7537-0)
    - All issues of the "Checkout" crossover — Checkmate vol. 2 #13–15 and The Outsiders vol. 3 #47–49 — are co-written by Rucka and Judd Winick.
    - Issues #17 and 21–25 are co-written by Rucka and Eric Trautmann.
- The Question:
  - Crime Bible: Five Lessons of Blood #1–5 (with various artists, 2007–2008) collected as The Question: Five Books of Blood (hc, 128 pages, 2008, ISBN 1-4012-1799-0; tpb, 2009, ISBN 1-4012-2335-4)
  - Final Crisis: Revelations #1–5 (with Philip Tan, 2008–2009) collected as Final Crisis: Revelations (hc, 168 pages, 2009, ISBN 1-84856-351-5; tpb, 2010, ISBN 1-4012-2323-0)
  - Detective Comics #854–865: "The Question: Pipeline" (with Cully Hamner, co-feature, 2009–2010) collected as The Question: Pipeline (tpb, 128 pages, 2011, ISBN 1-4012-3041-5)
  - The Question #37 (co-written by Rucka and Dennis O'Neil, art by Denys Cowan, 2010) collected in Blackest Night: Rise of the Black Lanterns (hc, 256 pages, 2010, ISBN 1-4012-2789-9; tpb, 2011, ISBN 1-4012-2806-2)
  - Convergence: The Question #1–2 (with Cully Hamner, 2015) collected in Convergence: Flashpoint Book One (tpb, 272 pages, 2015, ISBN 1-4012-5835-2)
- Final Crisis Companion (tpb, 200 pages, 2009, ISBN 1-4012-2274-9) includes:
  - Final Crisis: Resist (co-written by Rucka and Eric Trautmann, art by Ryan Sook and Marco Rudy, one-shot, 2008)
  - Final Crisis Secret Files: "The Words of Lilith, Chapter 13, Verses 31–41" (with Steve Lieber, co-feature in one-shot, 2009)
- Action Comics #879–889: "Captain Atom" (script by James Robinson from a plot by Rucka and Robinson, art by CAFU, co-feature, 2009–2010)
- American Vampire Anthology #1: "Portland, 1940" (with John Paul Leon, Vertigo, 2013) collected in American Vampire Volume 6 (hc, 144 pages, 2014, ISBN 1-4012-4708-3; tpb, 2014, ISBN 1-4012-4929-9)
- Lois Lane: Enemy of the People (tpb, 304 pages, 2020, ISBN 1-77950-474-8) collects:
  - Superman: Leviathan Rising: "Looking for Clark" (with Mike Perkins, co-feature in one-shot, 2019)
  - Lois Lane #1–12 (with Mike Perkins, 2019–2020)
- DC All In:
  - Cheetah and Cheshire Rob the Justice League #1-#6 (2025-2026)
  - Batwoman (vol. 4) (2026-)

=== Marvel Comics ===
Titles published by Marvel include:

- Marvel Knights: Black Widow — The Complete Collection (tpb, 224 pages, 2018, ISBN 1-302-91400-6) includes:
  - Black Widow vol. 2 #1–3 (co-written by Rucka and Devin K. Grayson, art by Scott Hampton, Marvel Knights, 2001)
  - Black Widow: Pale Little Spider #1–3 (with Igor Kordey, Marvel MAX, 2002)
- Spider-Man:
  - Spider-Man's Tangled Web #4: "Severance Package" (with Eduardo Risso, anthology, 2001)
    - Collected in Spider-Man's Tangled Web Volume 1 (tpb, 144 pages, 2002, ISBN 0-7851-0803-3)
    - Collected in Spider-Man's Tangled Web Omnibus (hc, 560 pages, 2017, ISBN 1-302-90682-8)
  - Spider-Man: Quality of Life #1–4 (with Scott Christian Sava, 2002) collected as Spider-Man: Quality of Life (tpb, 112 pages, 2002, ISBN 0-7851-1011-9)
- Elektra and Wolverine: The Redeemer #1–3 (with Yoshitaka Amano, 2002) collected as Elektra and Wolverine: The Redeemer (hc, 208 pages, 2002, ISBN 0-7851-0911-0)
- Ultimate Collection: Elektra by Greg Rucka (tpb, 384 pages, 2012, ISBN 0-7851-6393-X) collects:
  - Elektra vol. 2 #7–22 (with Chuck Austen (#7–8), Joe Bennett (#9–10, 16–17), Carlo Pagulayan and Carlos Meglia (#19–20), 2002–2003)
  - Marvel Knights Double-Shot #3: "Trust" (with Greg Horn, anthology, 2002)
- X-Men Unlimited #38: "Yartzeit" (with Darick Robertson, anthology, 2002) collected in New X-Men Companion (tpb, 432 pages, 2019, ISBN 1-302-91841-9)
- Ultimate Daredevil and Elektra #1–4 (with Salvador Larroca, 2003) collected as Ultimate Daredevil and Elektra (tpb, 128 pages, 2003, ISBN 0-7851-1076-3)
- Marvel Double-Shot #4: "Man of Iron" (with Klaus Janson, anthology, 2003)
- Wolverine vol. 3 #1–19 (with Darick Robertson and Leandro Fernández (#7–11), 2003–2004) collected as Ultimate Collection: Wolverine by Greg Rucka (tpb, 384 pages, 2012, ISBN 0-7851-6393-X)
- Daredevil vol. 2 #107–110 (co-written by Rucka and Ed Brubaker, art by Michael Lark, 2008) collected in Ultimate Collection: Daredevil by Ed Brubaker and Michael Lark Volume 3 (tpb, 384 pages, 2012, ISBN 0-7851-6336-0)
- I am an Avenger #2: "Post-Mortem" (with Michael Lark, anthology, 2010) collected in We are the Avengers (tpb, 120 pages, 2011, ISBN 0-7851-5154-0)
- Punisher:
  - The Punisher vol. 9 (with Marco Checchetto, Matthew Clark + Matthew Southworth (#6), Michael Lark (#7), Mirko Colak (#9 and 11) and Mico Suayan (#13–14), 2011–2012) collected as:
    - The Punisher by Greg Rucka Volume 1 (collects #1–5, hc, 136 pages, 2012, ISBN 0-7851-6374-3; tpb, 2012, ISBN 0-7851-5735-2)
      - Includes the "Tingling" short story (art by Max Fiumara) from Spider-Island: I Love New York City (one-shot, 2011)
    - The Punisher by Greg Rucka Volume 2 (collects #6–10, tpb, 208 pages, 2012, ISBN 0-7851-5920-7)
      - Includes Avenging Spider-Man #6 (co-written by Rucka and Mark Waid, art by Marco Checchetto, 2012)
    - The Punisher by Greg Rucka Volume 3 (collects #11–16, tpb, 128 pages, 2013, ISBN 0-7851-5921-5)
  - Punisher: War Zone vol. 3 #1–5 (with Carmine Di Giandomenico, 2012–2013) collected as Punisher: Enter the War Zone (tpb, 112 pages, 2013, ISBN 0-7851-6742-0)
- Cyclops #1–5 (with Russell Dauterman and Carmen Carnero (#4–5), 2014) collected as Cyclops: Starstruck (tpb, 112 pages, 2014, ISBN 0-7851-9075-9)
- Star Wars: Shattered Empire #1–4 (with Marco Checchetto, 2015) collected as Journey to Star Wars: The Force Awakens — Shattered Empire (tpb, 136 pages, 2015, ISBN 0-7851-9781-8; hc, 2016, ISBN 1-302-90210-5)
- Captain America: Sam Wilson #7: "Pas de Deux" (with Mike Perkins, co-feature, 2016) collected in Captain America: Sam Wilson — The Complete Collection Volume 2 (tpb, 504 pages, 2021, ISBN 1-302-92297-1)

=== Image Comics ===
Titles published by Image include:

- Felon #1–4 (of 6) (with Matthew Clark, Minotaur Press, 2001–2002)
- Lazarus (with Michael Lark):
  - Lazarus (2013–2018) collected as:
    - The First Collection (collects #1–9 and the 4-page digital preview, hc, 245 pages, 2014, ISBN 1-63215-183-9)
    - The Second Collection (collects #10–21, hc, 320 pages, 2016, ISBN 1-63215-722-5)
    - The Third Collection (includes #22–26, hc, 344 pages, 2019, ISBN 1-5343-1334-6)
      - Also collects the 6-issue spin-off limited series Lazarus X+66 (2017–2018)
        - Issue #1 is co-written by Rucka and Eric Trautmann, art by Steve Lieber.
        - Issue #2 is co-written by Rucka and Aaron Duran, art by Mack Chater.
        - Issue #3 is co-written by Rucka and Neal Bailey, art by Justin Greenwood.
        - Issue #4 is co-written by Rucka and Eric Trautmann, art by Alitha Martinez.
        - Issue #5 is co-written by Rucka and Eric Trautmann, art by Bilquis Evely.
        - Issue #6 is co-written by Rucka and Eric Trautmann, art by Tristan Jones.
  - Lazarus: Risen #1–7 (2019–2022) partially collected as:
    - Lazarus: Fracture I (collects #1–3, tpb, 152 pages, 2020, ISBN 1-5343-0842-3)
    - Lazarus: Fracture II (collects #5–7 and Lazarus #27–28, tpb, 144 pages, 2022, ISBN 1-5343-1919-0)
  - Lazarus Fallen (2025-ongoing)
- Black Magick (with Nicola Scott, 2015–ongoing) collected as:
  - Awakening I (collects #1–5, tpb, 128 pages, 2016, ISBN 1-63215-675-X)
  - Awakening II (collects #6–11, tpb, 136 pages, 2018, ISBN 1-5343-0483-5)
  - Ascension I (collects #12–16, tpb, 136 pages, 2021, ISBN 1-5343-1373-7)
- The Old Guard (with Leandro Fernández):
  - The Old Guard #1–5 (2017) collected as The Old Guard: Opening Fire (tpb, 160 pages, 2017, ISBN 1-5343-0240-9)
  - The Old Guard: Force Multiplied #1–5 (2019–2020) collected as The Old Guard: Force Multiplied (tpb, 128 pages, 2020, ISBN 1-5343-1377-X)
  - The Old Guard: Tales Through Time #1–6 (anthology, 2021) collected as The Old Guard: Tales Through Time (tpb, 176 pages, 2021, ISBN 1-5343-2005-9)
    - Issue #1 featured "My Mother's Axe" (written by Rucka, art by Leandro Fernández) and "Zanzibar and Other Harbors" (written by Andrew Wheeler, drawn by Jacopo Camagni)
    - Issue #2 featured "Bonsai Shokunin" (written by Kelly Sue DeConnick, drawn by Valentine De Landro) and "Strong Medicine" (written by Eric Trautmann, drawn by Mike Henderson)
    - Issue #3 featured "Passchendaele" (written by Brian Michael Bendis, drawn by Michael Avon Oeming) and "Lacus Solitudinis" (written by Dave Walker and Robert Mackenzie, drawn by Justin Greenwood)
    - Issue #4 featured "How to Make a Ghost Town" (written by Matt Fraction, drawn by Steve Lieber) and "Love Letters" (written by David F. Walker, drawn by Matthew Clark)
    - Issue #5 featured "An Old Soul" (written by Jason Aaron, drawn by Rafael Albuquerque) and "Never Gets Old" (written by Alejandro Arbona, drawn by Kano)
    - Issue #6 featured "Many Happy Returns" (written by Vita Ayala, drawn by Nicola Scott) and "The Bear" (written by Rucka, art by Leandro Fernández)
  - Image! #12: "When There Were Five" (anthology, 2023)
  - The Old Guard: Fade Away (forthcoming)
- The Forged #1–ongoing (co-written by Rucka and Eric Trautmann, art by Mike Henderson, 2023–...)

=== Other publishers ===
Titles published by various American publishers include:

- Adventures @ eBay (co-written by Rucka and Jen Van Meter, art by Judd Winick, one-shot, eBay Publishing, 2000)
- Knights of the Dinner Table: Hackmasters of Everknight #7 (with Manny Vega, Kenzer & Company, 2001)
- Lady Sabre and the Pirates of the Ineffable Aether (with Rick Burchett, webcomic, 2011–2016)
- Dark Horse:
  - Veil #1–5 (with Toni Fejzula, 2014) collected as Veil (hc, 136 pages, 2015, ISBN 1-61655-492-4)
  - Dragon Age: Magekiller #1–5 (with Carmen Carnero, 2015–2016) collected as Dragon Age: Magekiller (tpb, 120 pages, 2016, ISBN 1-61655-634-X)
- Call of Duty: Black Ops 4 #10: "Battery" (with Vincenzo Cucca, free digital comic, Activision, 2018) collected in Call of Duty: Black Ops 4 — The Official Comic Collection (hc, 240 pages, 2019, ISBN 1-945683-94-5)
