= Renee Montoya =

DC Comics superheroine

- Renee Montoya, as she appeared on the cover of GCPD: The Blue Wall #1 (October 2022), art by Reiko Murakami.

Publication information
- Publisher: DC Comics
- First appearance: Batman: The Animated Series (1992)
- First comic appearance: As Renee Montoya: Batman #475 (March 1992); As Question: 52 #48 (April 2007)
- Created by: Bruce Timm; Paul Dini; Mitch Brian

In-story information
- Alter ego: Renee Maria Montoya
- Team affiliations: Global Peace Agency; Batman Incorporated; Gotham City Police Department; Birds of Prey; Justice League
- Supporting character of: Batman, Batwoman
- Notable aliases: Question
- Abilities: Trained detective

Renee Maria Montoya is a character appearing in media of DC Comics. The character was created by Bruce Timm, Paul Dini and Mitch Brian for Batman: The Animated Series and was preemptively introduced into mainstream comics before the airing of her animated debut in 1992 in the DC Animated Universe (DCAU) series Batman: The Animated Series, voiced by Ingrid Oliu, and later Liane Schirmer.

Renee is initially a detective from the Gotham City Police Department, assigned to the Major Crimes Unit, who comes into frequent contact with Batman. After being outed and framed for murder, she resigns from the police force, and begins operating as the second Question out of a lighthouse that she shares with Aristotle Rodor on the Outer Banks of North Carolina.

Montoya made her live-action debut in the first season of Gotham, portrayed by Victoria Cartagena, who reprised the role in the third season of the Arrowverse series Batwoman, with both series portraying her as an antagonist before becoming an ally. She made her cinematic debut in the 2020 DC Extended Universe (DCEU) film Birds of Prey, portrayed by Rosie Perez.

== Fictional character biography ==
Renee Montoya, as she appeared in Batman: The Animated Series and The New Batman Adventures.

Montoya was created for Batman: The Animated Series by Bruce Timm, Paul Dini, and Mitch Brian, as described in the series bible. She first appears as a uniformed officer partnered with Harvey Bullock. In the follow-up series The New Batman Adventures, Montoya is promoted from police officer to detective. She also makes a cameo appearance in Batman & Mr. Freeze: SubZero. The comic series Gotham Central describes Montoya as the daughter of immigrants from the Dominican Republic, making her Dominican-American.

Renee is a recurring character in the Batman-related comics after Batman #475 (March 1992). After she is promoted to homicide detective by Commissioner Gordon, Renee is partnered with Harvey Bullock. After Bullock is promoted to Lieutenant, Crispus Allen becomes Renee's new partner.

Gotham City is destroyed by an earthquake in Cataclysm and closed off from the rest of the United States in the No Man's Land story arc. Montoya and Bullock are two of the many Gotham police officers to stay behind with James Gordon to keep the peace among the people who remain.

Renee is the focus of an uneasy truce between Gordon's forces and the crime boss Two-Face. She reaches out to Two-Face's Harvey Dent persona in helping with aid and relief efforts, and he falls in love with her. In fact, he keeps her restrained in his headquarters against her will. She becomes involved when Two-Face puts James Gordon on trial for perceived wrongdoing. Renee persuades Two-Face to offer a more fair trial, giving Gordon a defense lawyer. Dent takes on this role and convinces Two-Face to free everyone.

Gotham City is later re-opened thanks to humanitarian efforts spearheaded by Lex Luthor. Renee, Gordon, Bullock and the surviving officers are re-instated as police officials.

In "Officer Down", Renee is hit hard by a murder attempt on Gordon, and when the assassin walks free, goes to seek vengeance. However, Bullock catches her in the act and persuades her not to pull the trigger, telling her that revenge is not worth her career.

=== Gotham Central ===
Montoya and Two-Face, art by Michael Lark.

Montoya is one of the main characters of Gotham Central, a comic book series about the Gotham City police department. Believing that the only way to have Montoya is to take everything away from her, Two-Face publicly outs her as a lesbian and frames her for murder. He then kidnaps her, making it look like Montoya has escaped. Two-Face becomes more unstable and the two fight for control of his gun until Batman arrives to save them. Montoya is cleared of all charges and Two-Face returns to Arkham, but her parents disown her.

In the 2004–2005 "War Games" storyline, Montoya and Crispus Allen are ambushed by Black Spider, and Allen shoots the villain. Corrupt police officer Jim Corrigan steals and sells the bullet, which is needed to prove that the shooting was in self-defense. In her pursuit of the bullet, Montoya beats the name of the buyer out of Corrigan. Although Allen is cleared, Montoya becomes obsessed with exposing Corrigan. Allen tries to persuade Montoya to let it go, but Montoya refuses, so Allen investigates Corrigan independently. During his investigation, one of Allen's informants is murdered shortly before Allen himself is shot and killed by Corrigan. Montoya takes it upon herself to bring Corrigan to justice. Tracking him down, Montoya beats Corrigan's girlfriend unconscious and draws a gun on Corrigan. He begs for his life, and Montoya finds she cannot pull the trigger. Montoya quits the GCPD the next day, disgusted and broken.

=== 52 ===
Renee Montoya as the Question in 52 #48 (April 2007), art by Darick Robertson.

In the 2006–2007 series 52, Montoya, having been fired from the GCPD, is now a depressed alcoholic obsessing about the loss of her job and girlfriend Daria who had walked out on her three months previously, unable to watch Renée "destroy herself". The Question (Vic Sage) shines a Bat-Signal (modified to throw a question mark) at her window, asking if she is ready.

The Question believes that Intergang is preparing to invade Gotham, and to that end, hires Montoya to surveil a warehouse in Gotham City, where they uncover futuristic weapons.

During Week 14, Montoya and the Question fly to Kahndaq, and track down some leads on Intergang. Kyle Abbot, a werewolf-like member of Intergang, tracks them. After they leave an empty warehouse, they are taken prisoner by members of Black Adam's army.

Nightwing and Montoya find a strange device in a warehouse guarded by hybrid creatures. Nightwing hypothesizes that it is a bomb. Attacked by several Intergang henchmen, the pair are helped by a disillusioned Abbot. The device is activated, erupting in a pillar of flame. At the same time numerous other devices are also activated, as Intergang attempts to destroy Gotham by fire. A dying Sage passes the Question identity to Montoya, who dons his mask before going after Bruno Mannheim, finding him and Whisper A'Daire as they are about to use Kate as a sacrificial victim. Montoya sets Whisper A'Daire on fire but is about to be killed by Mannheim when Kate stabs him with the ceremonial knife before collapsing in Montoya's arms.

=== "One Year Later" and "Final Crisis" ===
Montoya appears in Countdown #40 when Oracle solicits her help in capturing the Trickster and the Pied Piper, who are suspected to have killed Bart Allen. The two criminals escape the Suicide Squad only to be apprehended by Montoya and Batwoman. Montoya agrees to their release, concluding they are too stupid to be murderers. Montoya maintains that she will not become a member of the Birds of Prey, but Oracle calls upon her to accompany the Birds of Prey in Gotham Underground #2.

She later stars in Crime Bible: Five Lessons of Blood, in which she pursues the Crime Bible and withstands its adherents' efforts to convert her to their cause. In Final Crisis (2008), Montoya informs Dan Turpin that she is investigating the Dark Side Club. She later battles Frankenstein and the agents of S.H.A.D.E. during her investigation of an apocalyptic conspiracy related to the Crime Bible (now in possession of Libra) and Darkseid. She is accosted by S.H.A.D.E. agents in her civilian identity when she assists an alternate universe version of Supergirl.

Montoya appears in the Final Crisis: Revelations miniseries by Greg Rucka. While trying to stop members of the Religion of Crime from obtaining a mystic weapon, she is confronted by Crispus Allen's spirit, who has become the Spectre. The Spectre states that she is about to receive judgment. He is stopped by Radiant, the Spirit of Mercy, who embodies the ideal of Christian love.

Maggie Sawyer, corrupted by the Anti-Life Equation, emerges from Gotham Central along with the rest of the brainwashed police force. They attempt to unleash the Equation on Montoya, but are stopped by the intervention of the Spectre and Radiant. The Spectre is not able to hold them off for long, because they are protected by the same force that protects Libra. Radiant makes sure that Montoya cannot be brainwashed, and teleports her away. Later, Montoya discovers that Batwoman has fallen under the Equation's influence.

Montoya appears in Final Crisis #5, recruited by the underground resistance movement organized by Checkmate. She is told that she must travel the Multiverse and gather help for New Earth. In Final Crisis #7 she is seen accompanied by Captain Marvel (of Earth 5) where she gathers a group of alternative versions of Superman that help end the Final Crisis and defeat Mandrakk the Dark Monitor. She identifies herself as a "Global Peace agent" in Final Crisis #7, an allusion to the Global Peace Agency.

Starting in Detective Comics #854, Montoya appeared in an ongoing backup feature written by Greg Rucka, with art by Cully Hamner.

=== Batwoman: Detective Comics ===
Montoya takes the case of a missing illegal immigrant — the young sister of the man named Hector Soliz seeking her detective services. She follows some leads to their hideout and discovers pornographic pictures of the girl, indicating she may have become involved in a child pornography or sexual slavery ring. While investigating a businessman whom she believes is involved with the slavery, Montoya is kidnapped and left to die after being tied up in the trunk of a car that is driven into a river. She easily escapes and eventually tracks the slaves to a boat owned by the businessman. After a brief fight with several henchmen, the police arrive and rescue the women, reuniting Hector with his sister.

When Montoya briefly returned to Gotham City, she worked with the new Batman and quickly realized that he was Nightwing. Her old partner Bullock also discovered that Renee is the new Question, pointing out that he worked with her long enough to be able to recognize her butt anywhere.

=== "Blackest Night" ===
During the events of the 2009–2010 "Blackest Night" storyline, Montoya is tracked down by Lady Shiva, who claims that she wishes to test her in combat to see if she is a worthy successor to Victor. The two women engage in a brutal fist fight, only to be interrupted when Vic Sage, now reanimated as a Black Lantern, arrives on the scene and attacks them. After a drawn out battle, Renee discovers that Black Lanterns feed on emotions, and that if she is able to cut herself off from her feelings, she will become invisible. She does so, and angered, Victor stalks off into the night, searching for easier prey. Shiva reveals that she never intended to actually fight Montoya, but felt that attacking her would draw Victor out into the open so she could face him again.

Some time after this, Montoya teams up with the Huntress to bring down the criminal network that Renee had earlier encountered. Eventually, the hitman known as Zeiss attacks the women, having been ordered by an unknown client to kill them. Renee appeals to the hitman's greed, offering him more money if he simply fakes their deaths and leaves them be. After this, Huntress takes Renee to Oracle for help in tracking down the client who put out the hit, and is flabbergasted upon discovering that Oracle is in fact "Commissioner Gordon's daughter". The two women eventually make their way to Oolong Island (home of the Doom Patrol), where they are arrested. After escaping from police custody, Huntress and the Question discovered that Vandal Savage is behind the human trafficking network they had been trying to shut down. Savage offers to shut down his criminal network in exchange for one of them taking the Mark of Cain, which had been branded onto his face by the Spectre during the events of Final Crisis. Renee ultimately chooses to accept the Mark of Cain, ending Savage's reign of terror but leaving her face disfigured.

Following this, the Question appears alongside Batwoman as part of Wonder Woman's team of superheroines when a group of aliens attack Washington D.C. Rose Wilson jokingly asks her if she intends to seek an autograph from Wonder Woman, only for Renee to nervously remark that she is trying to work her way up to asking for one.

=== Batman Inc. ===
Montoya seeks out Richard Dragon, who helps her learn to suppress the Mark through her mental willpower. Following Bruce Wayne's return to the 21st century, he establishes Batman, Inc., a global network of Batmen from various nations. Batman sends Renee to Paris, France, to infiltrate the Golden Portal, a violent cult responsible for a number of deaths. Renee allows herself to be captured and brainwashed by the cult's leader, Korrigan, and ultimately uses mental techniques taught to her by Richard and Victor to overcome Korrigan. With help from Batman and the French vigilante Nightrunner, the members of the Golden Portal are defeated and Korrigan is arrested.

=== The New 52 ===
As part of The New 52, a 2011 line-wide revision of DC superhero comics, including their fictional histories, Montoya appears in an image viewed by Batwoman on the GCPD's wall of honor. James Tynion IV, a writer on Batman Eternal, revealed that the creative team almost included Montoya, but they decided against it: "We cut her out because we didn't want her to just be in the background of the GCPD. We want to bring her back for her own big story".

Montoya appears in Detective Comics (vol. 2) #41, as Harvey Bullock's new partner.

=== DC Rebirth ===
DC included Renee Montoya in a line-wide revision of DC superhero comic books, stories and characters they dubbed "DC Rebirth". Montoya appeared sporadically in Detective Comics, still working for the GCPD and slowly rebuilding her relationship with Kate Kane. The two eventually became a couple again in the final issue of the Rebirth Batwoman series.

In July 2019, Montoya debuted as the Question in Lois Lane (vol. 2) #1 as a supporting character. As the Question, she also plays a minor role in Event Leviathan, also from 2019.

=== Infinite Frontier ===
Renee rejoins the GCPD around the time of "A-Day", a massive attack on Arkham Asylum by the Joker that results in the deaths of dozens of inmates and staff; the circumstances of why she gave up being the Question have yet to be depicted. In The Next Batman: Second Son #1, Gotham City Mayor Christopher Nakano asks Renee to become the Commissioner of the GCPD to replace Jim Gordon, who has retired. The evening before she plans to accept the position, Renee has a run-in with two GCPD officers who are harassing a man Renee had arrested years earlier and who had received a relatively harsh sentence for a low-level drug offense. Conflicted after hearing the man's explanation, Renee begins reconsidering her choice to accept the Commissioner position. Batwoman meets Renee, and the two discuss the issue; Kate helps clarify Renee's thoughts on the matter, and Renee concludes that she has the chance to help clean up the GCPD and amend for the sorts of abuses of power she saw as both a patrol cop and a detective that she couldn't otherwise prevent, as well as ones she herself took part in, in the name of meeting monthly citation quotas. Renee accepts the role of GCPD Commissioner.

In the Batman: Urban Legends story "Disinformation Campaign", she and Kate Kane are revealed to have broken up sometime prior to the start of the story for unknown reasons.

=== Watchtower era ===
Following the events of Absolute Power (2024) and the start of DC All In, the Justice League expands its roster and moves to a new Justice League Watchtower. Renee, once again serving as the Question, joins the League and becomes the head of security at the Watchtower. She serves as the lead character in the murder mystery miniseries The Question: All Along the Watchtower.

== Equipment ==
- Montoya uses an advanced energy pistol she found while fighting with Intergang, as well as her police sidearm.
- After the death of Vic Sage, Montoya inherited his costume, mask, fedora and trench coat, all of which have been treated to react to the binary gas created by Aristotle Rodor. In addition, Rodor provided Montoya with a shampoo that causes her hair to change color when exposed to the gas. In the Question: Secret Origin backup in 52, it is stated that this substance was developed using technology taken from Batman foe enemy Doctor No-Face as well as Gingold Extract, a fruit derivative associated with Elongated Man.
- The mask adheres to her face and renders it as a featureless blank when exposed to the binary gas. The binary gas is expelled from a special belt buckle worn by Montoya. The gas also causes her chemically treated costume, fedora, and trench coat to change color, typically to dark blue.

== Other versions ==
- An alternate timeline version of Renee Montoya who became the commissioner of the GCPD appears in "Titans Tomorrow".
- An alternate timeline version of Renee Montoya appears in the "Flashpoint" storyline.
- An alternate universe version of Renee Montoya from Earth-3 who works for Owlman appears in "Forever Evil".
- An alternate universe version of Renee Montoya appears in DC Comics Bombshells. This version is a Republican veteran of the Spanish Civil War and member of a German resistance group led by Selina Digatti.

== Reception ==
Renee Montoya was ranked as the 80th-greatest comic book character of all time by the Wizard magazine. IGN also listed Montoya as the 87th-greatest comic book hero of all time: a character representing ethnic diversity, who has undergone a tremendous personal transformation from humble beginnings.

== Collection editions ==
Title	Material collected	Publication date	ISBN
The Question: Pipeline	Detective Comics #854-864	January 2011	978-1401230418
Final Crisis: Revelations	Final Crisis: Revelations #1-5	August 2009	978-1401223229

== In other media ==
=== Television ===
- A young Renee Montoya appears in the first season of Gotham, portrayed by Victoria Cartagena. This version is a recovering drug addict and former lover of Detective James Gordon's fiancée Barbara Kean who works in the GCPD's Major Crimes Unit as a detective alongside Crispus Allen.
- Renee Montoya appears in Batwoman, portrayed again by Victoria Cartagena. This version is a former member of the Gotham City Police Department who left due to corrupt members and has a secret romantic past with Poison Ivy.
- Renee Montoya appears in DC Super Hero Girls, voiced by Roxana Ortega. This version is a security guard at Metropolis High School.
- Renee Montoya makes a non-speaking cameo appearance in the Young Justice episode "Triptych".
- Renee Montoya appears in Batman: Caped Crusader, voiced by Michelle Bonilla.

=== Film ===
- A character with similar traits to Renee Montoya named Anna Ramírez appears in The Dark Knight, portrayed by Monique Gabriela Curnen. This version is a rookie Gotham City Police Department detective who is reluctantly corrupted by the mafia, who are implied to be helping with her mother's medical costs in exchange for her cooperation. In the film, she and fellow corrupt officer Wertz secretly tip off the mafia about James Gordon and Harvey Dent's raids on their money locations, and later sell both Dent and Rachel Dawes out to the mafia after the Joker is captured. Rachel is subsequently killed, but Dent survives with half his face burned. Going by the name Two-Face, Dent confronts Ramirez and threatens her into calling Gordon's family to help him set a trap for them and Gordon as part of a revenge plan. Ramirez pleads with Dent but he decides her fate with a coin toss. As the coin lands on its good side, Dent spares Ramirez but knocks her out. Her fate afterwards is unrevealed.
- Renee Montoya appears in Batman: Bad Blood, voiced by Vanessa Marshall.
- Renee Montoya appears in Birds of Prey, portrayed by Rosie Perez. This version is a Gotham City Police Department (GCPD) Detective whose career has stalled due to her former partner and current captain Patrick Erickson taking credit for solving a past case sometime prior. In the present, she develops a fixation towards Roman Sionis while investigating his criminal activities, but is suspended for failing to provide evidence. After Montoya joins forces with Harley Quinn, Dinah Lance, and Helena Bertinelli to rescue Cassandra Cain from Sionis, Erickson takes credit for doing so, leading her to resign from the GCPD and join Lance and Bertinelli in forming the Birds of Prey.
- Renee Montoya appears in Batman: The Long Halloween, voiced by Alyssa Diaz.
- Renee Montoya appears in Batman: Knightfall, voiced by Jessica Camacho.

=== Video games ===
- Renee Montoya makes a cameo appearance in Batman: Dark Tomorrow, voiced by Erin Quinn Purcell.
- Renee Montoya as the Question appears in DC Universe Online.
- Renee Montoya as the Question appears as a character summon in Scribblenauts Unmasked: A DC Comics Adventure.
- Renee Montoya appears in Batman: The Telltale Series, voiced by Krizia Bajos. This version is a sergeant for the Gotham City Police Department.
- Renee Montoya appears in Batman: The Enemy Within, voiced by Sumalee Montano. As of this game, she has been promoted to detective.
- Renee Montoya appears in Lego DC Super-Villains, voiced again by Liane Schirmer.
- Renee Montoya appears in Gotham Knights, voiced again by Krizia Bajos. This version is a captain for the Gotham City Police Department.

=== Miscellaneous ===
- Renee Montoya appears in BBC Radio's "Batman: Knightfall" adaptation, voiced by Lorelei King.
- Renee Montoya appears in Gotham Girls, voiced by Adrienne Barbeau.
- Renee Montoya appears in the Injustice: Gods Among Us prequel comic. This version is a member of Batman's Insurgency and the wife of Batwoman who eventually dies from overusing performance-enhancing drugs in an attempt to kill High Councilor Superman.

== See also ==
- LGBT themes in comics
- Homosexuality in the Batman franchise
