= Firebug (comics) =

Publication information
- Publisher: DC Comics
- First appearance: (Rigger); Batman #318 (December 1979) (Combs); Gotham Central #3 (March 2003) (Unnamed); Deadshot (vol. 2) #1 (February 2005)
- Created by: (Rigger); Len Wein (writer); Irv Novick (artist) (Combs); Ed Brubaker (writer); Michael Lark (artist) (Unknown); Christos Gage (writer); Steven Cummings (artist)

In-story information
- Alter ego: -Joe Rigger -Harlan Combs -Unnamed
- Species: Human
- Abilities: (Rigger); Military training Costume contains napalm tanks to set things on fire

Firebug is the name of three supervillains appearing in media published by DC Comics, primarily as enemies of Batman. All three are insect-themed arsonists, similar to Firefly.

Firebug has made limited appearances in media outside comics, with Tom Kenny voicing the Joe Rigger incarnation of the character in Batman: Caped Crusader.

== Publication history ==
The Joe Rigger incarnation of Firebug debuted in Batman #318 and was created by Len Wein and Irv Novick.

The Harlan Combs incarnation of Firebug debuted in Gotham Central #3 and was created by Ed Brubaker and Michael Lark.

The unnamed Firebug debuted in Deadshot (vol. 2) #1 and was created by Christos Gage and Steven Cummings.

== Fictional character biographies ==
=== Joe Rigger ===
Joe Rigger is a soldier and demolitions expert who returns to Gotham City after several of his family members are killed in separate building-related accidents. His sanity slipping, Rigger vows that the buildings will not kill again. Using his military training and a costume containing tanks of napalm, Rigger becomes Firebug and sets out to burn all three buildings to the ground. He is defeated by Batman atop the Gotham State Building and presumed dead after his tank explodes.

Firebug escapes from Blackgate Penitentiary and applies for membership in Black Mask's gang, but is beaten by rival arsonist Firefly. He subsequently attempts to prove he is a better arsonist, but appears to die in a fire he started. Firebug is later revealed to have survived. His close brush with death along with the scarring it caused prompts him to sell his Firebug costume and gear and retire.

In The New 52 reboot, Firebug is reintroduced when he is hired by an unknown party to blow up several Gotham buildings to lure and kill Batgirl. She survives the attempt and tracks down Firebug. Upon his arrest, Firebug claims his employers will not allow him to be incarcerated.

=== Harlan Combs ===
A new Firebug debuts in Gotham Central #3. At first, his identity is unknown and he is wanted in the murder of a teenage girl who was killed after a babysitting job. Eventually, the Gotham police deduce that the culprit was Harlan Combs, the father of the child she was sitting. Combs was originally a civilian who purchased the Firebug costume from Joe Rigger. Combs is injured fleeing the police and is quickly arrested.

=== Unnamed ===
An unnamed character using the name Firebug debuted in the 2005 series Deadshot. He had won the name and costume from an Internet auction. After taking on the Firebug name, he enters the costume business.

Firebug later appears in a flashback revealing that he teamed up with Mr. Freeze, but was defeated by Batman and Harvey Dent prior to Batman leaving Gotham City for a year.

== In other media ==
- Firebug appears as a boss in Batman: The Video Game. This version is the Joker's bodyguard who seeks revenge on Batman for defeating his brother and possesses super-speed and pyrokinesis.
- The Joe Rigger incarnation of Firebug appears in the Batman: Caped Crusader episode "The Night of the Hunters", voiced by Tom Kenny.

== See also ==
- List of Batman family enemies
