= Batman: GCPD =

Comic book miniseries

Publication information
- Publisher: DC Comics
- Format: Limited series
- Publication date: 1996
- No. of issues: 4

Creative team
- Written by: Chuck Dixon

Batman: GCPD, subtitled Gotham City Police Department on the cover trade dress, was a comic book miniseries written in 1996 by Chuck Dixon and drawn by Jim Aparo and Bill Sienkiewicz. Lasting four issues and detailing the exploits of the Gotham City Police Department, it precedes the better known Gotham Central by several years.

== Synopsis ==
The miniseries focused on many intertwining subplots, from the minor case of stolen office equipment to Detective Harvey Bullock investigating a serial killer. The murderer tends to leave teddy bears dressed up like his victims; at one point a teddy bear wearing Bullock's trademark beige trenchcoat appears.
