= The Batman in... Nine Lives =

Graphic novel

- Cover of The Batman in... Nine Lives HC, art by Michael Lark & Christopher Moeller

Publication information
- Publisher: DC Comics
- Publication date: April 2002
- Main character(s): Batman; Dick Grayson

Creative team
- Written by: Dean Motter
- Penciller: Michael Lark
- Inker: Michael Lark
- Letterer: Bill Oakley
- Colorist: Matt Hollingsworth

The Batman in... Nine Lives, or Batman: Nine Lives, is an Elseworlds graphic novel published by DC Comics in 2002, written by Dean Motter, with art by Michael Lark.

== Plot summary ==
Nine Lives differs from the normal Batman canon because it is set in the 1940s at a time when Gotham City is rife with organized crime. Rather than being a superhero story, it more closely resembles a detective comic book from the same era, before the idea of superheroes had been introduced. Though Batman still exists, members of his rogues gallery appear as normal criminals rather than mutated, disfigured, or technologically enhanced characters, a similar approach to that of Christopher Nolan's Batman film series.

The story begins with noirish narration, following the Batman down a sewer in search of a crocodile. Upon finding and wrestling the animal he is hit on the head by a mysterious assailant. When he awakens, he is lying next to the body of Selina Kyle.

Once the body is discovered, Private Detective Dick Grayson is accused by Commissioner Gordon of having something to do with the murder. As the story progresses, it is revealed that Selina Kyle earned the nickname of Catwoman because she owned the Kit Kat Club (a place of ill repute). She used her sexual allure to keep the club from going under financially, but she later resorted to blackmail, because she knew the secrets of many of Gotham's most wanted criminals.

== Characters ==
- Selina Kyle nicknamed Catwoman, a murdered owner of the bankrupt Kit Kat Club who was blackmailing many of the city's most powerful figures.
- Private Eye "Boy Wonder" Dick Grayson, an orphaned former circus performer and ex-cop who was hired as Selina's bodyguard but was fired the day before her death.
- Batman, a mysterious vigilante believed to be on the payroll of Bruce Wayne.
- Bruce Wayne, an aloof playboy millionaire and former lover of Selina Kyle.
- Police Commissioner Gordon, the head of Gotham's Police force who is investigating Selina's death and considers Grayson among his chief suspects.
- Barbara Gordon, the daughter of Commissioner Gordon who works as Grayson's secretary, despite her father's disapproval.
- Jack, a two-bit card dealer from Las Vegas who runs an unsuccessful underground gambling racket, earning him the nickname "Joker".
- Oswald Cobblepot, a dapper racketeer also known as the Penguin who uses his matrimonial businesses as a front for dodgy dealings.
- Mister Freeze, Cobblepot's hired sociopathic gunman.
- Matt Hagen, a powerful, disfigured gangster called Clayface who is owed money by Oswald Cobblepot.
- Edward Nigma, a guilt-riddled embezzling banker known as the Riddler, who was forced by Selina Kyle into a "business" relationship that consists of stealing for her.
- Harvey Dent, Bruce Wayne's two-faced lawyer and best friend.
- Croc, an ex-sideshow attraction who performed with Grayson in the circus when they were young.
- Oliver Queen, one of Wayne's society friends.
- Alfred, Bruce's personal butler.

== Critical reaction ==
The Batman in... Nine Lives won the 2003 Eisner Award for Best Publication Design. In 2011, IGN Comics ranked The Batman in... Nine Lives #25 on a list of the 25 greatest Batman graphic novels, calling it "one of the most unique and pleasurable Batman books ever written". When the list was updated in 2014, it was ranked #24.

== See also ==
- List of Elseworlds publications
- Batman: Gotham Noir, another Batman Elseworlds tale written in noir style.
