= Lazarus (comics) =

Comic book series

- Cover to Lazarus #2. Art by Michael Lark.

Publication information
- Publisher: Image Comics (US, Canada); Panini Comics (International)
- Schedule: Monthly (June 2013 – May 2018); Quarterly (March 2019 – September 2022)
- Format: Ongoing series
- Genre: Science fiction
- Publication date: June 2013

Creative team
- Written by: Greg Rucka
- Artist: Michael Lark
- Letterers: Jodi Wynne (#1–26); Simon Bowland (#27–28, Risen #1–present)
- Colorist: Santi Arcas

Collected editions
- 1. Family: ISBN 978-1-60706-809-9
- 2. Lift: ISBN 978-1-60706-871-6
- 3. Conclave: ISBN 978-1-63215-225-1
- 4. Poison: ISBN 9781632155238
- 5. Cull: ISBN 978-1-5343-0024-8
- X+66: ISBN 978-1-5343-0488-8
- 6. Fracture I: ISBN 978-1-5343-0842-8
- 7. Fracture II: ISBN 978-1-5343-1919-6
- HC Book 1: ISBN 978-1-63215-183-4
- HC Book 2: ISBN 978-1-63215-722-5
- HC Book 3: ISBN 978-1-5343-1334-7
- Sourcebook Vol. 1: ISBN 978-1-5343-0515-1

Lazarus is an American dystopian science fiction comic book series created by writer Greg Rucka and artist Michael Lark. The two began developing the idea in 2012 and partnered with colorist Santi Arcas to finish the art. Image Comics has been publishing the book since the first issue was released on June 23, 2013. Other creators were brought in later to assist with lettering and inking. A six-issue spin-off limited series, Lazarus: X+66, was released monthly in 2017 between issues 26 and 27 of the regular series. Rucka initially said the series could run for up to 150 issues, but later reduced the estimate by half. Lazarus is being collected into paperback and hardcover editions, which sell better than the monthly issues.

In the series, the world has been divided among sixteen rival families, who run their territories in a feudal system. The main character is Forever Carlyle, the military leader of the Carlyle family. The major themes of Lazarus are the meaning of "family" and nature versus nurture. Critics have given it mostly positive reviews and have praised its worldbuilding. It has received particular attention for its political themes.

In other media, Green Ronin Publishing used the Lazarus plot as a campaign setting for their Modern AGE role-playing game in 2018, and a television adaptation is in development with Legendary Television and Amazon Studios.

== Publication history ==
=== Early development ===
American writer Greg Rucka and artist Michael Lark had previously collaborated on the comic series Gotham Central for DC Comics between 2002 and 2004 and various small projects for Marvel Comics in the years following. Lark wanted to work with Rucka on a creator-owned comic because he felt he was at his best drawing the kind of stories Rucka writes.

In June 2012, Rucka was in Dallas as part of a book-signing tour. He had dinner with Lark, who lived nearby, and shared an idea for a scene involving a woman who had been shot rising from the dead and pursuing her attackers. Lark liked the story and committed to drawing the comic as soon as a full script was ready. Although Rucka had previously published his creator-owned material through Oni Press, his friend Ed Brubaker had been pushing him to work with Image Comics. When they contacted Image's Eric Stephenson and pitched the project as "The Godfather meets Children of Men", he immediately expressed interest. The project, titled Lazarus, was officially announced at San Diego Comic-Con on July 14, 2012. The announcement was accompanied by promotional artwork colored by American Elizabeth Breitweiser and featured a prototype logo design and typeface.

Image Comics provided David Brothers to serve as the series' editor. Eric Trautmann, who had previously edited two of Rucka's novels, was recruited to help with research, timelines, and design work. Lark wanted to work with a European colorist to provide a look distinct from traditional American comics. Rucka suggested Santi Arcas, a Spanish colorist he had worked with in the past, and Lark particularly liked Arcas' skies and textures.

Rucka and Lark developed the setting for Lazarus by looking at the Occupy movement and the underlying economics, then asking themselves "What happens if it goes horribly wrong?" They decided how the story would end before work began on the first issue. They initially gave their lead character the name Endeavor, but Rucka changed the name to Forever to avoid a conflict with a different comic being developed at the same time about a young Inspector Morse. Lark based her body type on the soccer player Hope Solo.

=== Production ===
Promotional concept artwork for Lazarus drawn by Michael Lark and colored by American Elizabeth Breitweiser. Lark chose not to use an American colorist for the published work because he wanted something more distinct.

Lark was disappointed by the first script as he felt none of the characters were likable, and the scene described to him over dinner was not included. In response, Rucka wrote a new draft restoring the missing opening scene. Lark began drawing the first issue in January 2013, basing the opening scene on the reconstruction sequence in 1997 film The Fifth Element.

When writing a new script, Rucka tries to follow the world-building model used by William Gibson in his 1984 novel Neuromancer and provide information about the environment through context instead of exposition. His biggest struggle is delivering details while maintaining a proper narrative pace. He sometimes self-censors "exceptionally dark" material because he does not want to make Lark draw it. After Lark receives a new script, the collaboration between them is "immediate and constant". Lark questions Rucka about characterization and the direction of the story, leading Rucka to rewrite scripts resulting in what he believes is a better final product. Lark refuses to read scripts in advance so he will stay focused on what is in front of him, not what he will be drawing next. Rucka says Lark intuitively knows what is happening in the story even when it isn't clearly scripted.

Rucka and Lark have an ongoing conversation about how to show the injustice in the way Forever is treated without being complicit in it themselves. For example, medics must remove Forever's clothes to treat her wounds. Lark wanted to avoid sexualizing the images, but also avoid being "coy" by simply blocking parts of her body with another character's arm. The script gives Lark no direction for aspects like architecture, clothing, or vehicle design. Designing these technical details involves research into prototype technology and takes almost as long as drawing the actual pages for the comics. The time required to create the sets is the primary reason Lark sometimes falls behind schedule.

Lark works on Lazarus ten or more hours per day. He uses photo references and digital tools in the early stages of his art, but the layouts and drawing are done with traditional tools. He is more involved with the coloring on Lazarus than any other comic he has illustrated. The logo design was finalized by Trautmann and Lark. Lark initially did all the lettering and inking for Lazarus, but doing so made it impossible to release new issues on a regular schedule. To give him more time to focus on drawing, some of the smaller tasks like logo and type design were given to other people. Brian Level assisted with inking on issues three through ten, when he was replaced by Tyler Boss. Beginning with issue ten, Jodi Wynne took over the lettering duties and Owen Freeman started creating the cover art. Fake advertisements found on the back covers and many of the computer screens and holographic images in the artwork are created by Trautmann. Lark and Rucka often discuss whether to use sound effects in scenes or limit their use. Lark does not want to rely on them to convey information because they may become a "crutch" in place of including important details in the art.

Issue 15 features a silent, thirteen-page fight between two characters. Rucka, who used to be a choreographer, filmed himself acting out the battle with a friend. Lark used the film for reference as he drew.

Following the 2016 United States presidential election, the creators' vision for the comic shifted. Rucka, who had used the letter columns in the series to discuss his concerns about then-candidate Donald Trump, told Oregon Public Broadcasting that after the election results Lazarus had changed from a dystopian science fiction story to a documentary. During a discussion panel at the 2017 Chicago Comic & Entertainment Expo, Rucka described Lazarus as being "about the blood red rage that leads to a Trump administration" before joking that he had "tried to warn you three years ago!" Although the overall plan for Lazarus did not change, Rucka said he had a growing interest in writing about a brighter future instead.

=== Publication ===
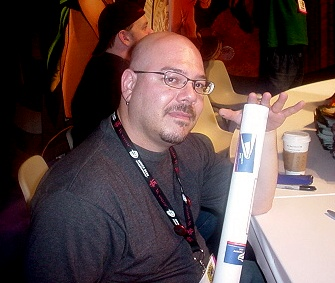
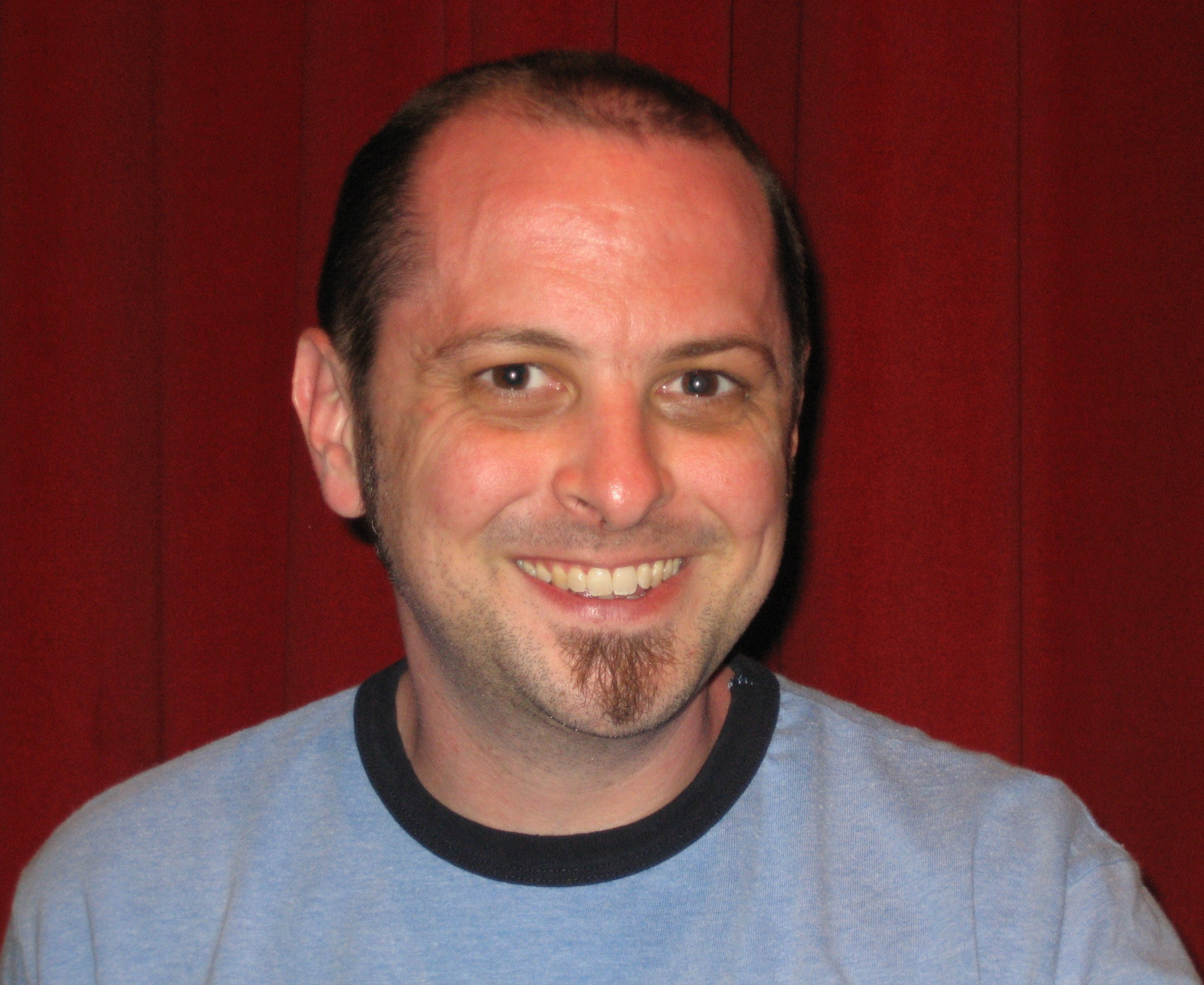
Writer Greg Rucka in 2007 (left) and artist Michael Lark in 2005 (right)

Brubaker advised Rucka to create a four-page "trailer" to promote the book, a strategy Brubaker had used with The Fade Out. Rucka was not initially interested, but Lark liked the idea. The trailer debuted at the 2013 Emerald City Comic Con before appearing online and in Previews, the catalog for Diamond Distribution. The scene was not reproduced in any issue of the series.

Most comics sold to specialty stores in the direct market are non-returnable. To reduce the financial risk for retailers who were uncertain about its sales potential, unsold copies from qualifying orders of the first three issues of Lazarus could be returned to the publisher. The first issue went on sale on June 26, 2013 and sold out of its approximately 48,000 copy print run at the distributor level. A second printing was announced to coincide with the release of issue two. After a second sellout, it was added to the "Image Firsts" program, a line of discounted first-issue reprints continuously available for retailers to order. By the end of 2013, the first issue had sold an estimated 50,200 copies. The second issue, which also went through multiple printings, sold an estimated 30,600 copies. Over the next two years, sales fell steadily to about 14,500 copies.

Because of scheduling issues, Rucka and Lark were behind on the series from the start. The problems were exacerbated by illness and poor communication during the "Lift" arc, causing issue 9 to be delayed by more than a month. Further late issues led retailers to reduce their orders for new issues. In fall 2015, the team announced a four-month hiatus between issues 21 and 22 to allow Lark to get ahead of schedule. They said they would not solicit any more issues until the next story arc was completed, and the hiatus actually lasted six months, in part because of miscommunication between Image Comics and Diamond Distribution. During the hiatus, they released a "sourcebook" providing additional, non-essential background on the Carlyle family. The sourcebook was created with input from Robert Mackenzie and David Walker, who had been providing annotations for the series at NerdSpan. Despite the break, five months passed between the fourth and fifth chapters of the Cull arc. A second sourcebook detailing the Hock Family was released in April 2017.

In the letter column of issue 26, Rucka announced a six-issue limited series titled Lazarus: X+66 would be released monthly beginning July 2017. The series was written by Rucka and Trautmann, and each issue focused on different supporting characters from the main series. Lark was involved as a consultant, but each issue was drawn by a new artist. This decision gave Lark time to work on something unrelated to Lazarus, which had been his only project since the series began. A four-page preview of the first installment, drawn by Steve Lieber, was included with the book's solicitation in Image Plus #16. A third source book, this time covering the Vassalovka family, was released one week after the limited series ended. Lark returned to Lazarus in April 2018 with issue 27.

In the letter column of issue 27, Rucka announced the series would change to a 64-page quarterly format beginning with issue 29 in September 2018. The new format features 44 pages of comic story and the remaining 20 pages are a variety of prose material including short stories and role-playing game supplements. When the proposed issue 29 was released, it was retitled and renumbered as Lazarus: Risen #1.

When the series began, Rucka estimated it would take between 100 and 150 issues to reach the ending. In May 2016, he revised his estimate downward, saying Lazarus was "25–30% complete at issue 21".

=== Collected editions ===
The series has been compiled in six trade paperbacks and three hardcovers. The first paperback collection appeared on the New York Times Best Seller List for Paperback Graphic Books in eighth position for two weeks in November 2013. The second appeared in the tenth spot for one week in August 2014. The hardcovers include introductions from notable comic creators like Warren Ellis and behind-the-scenes material not otherwise available. Rucka and Lark take the extra content in them "very seriously" because hardcovers are expensive. In 2015, Rucka said sales of single issues "aren't great", but went on to say the series is selling better in a collected format. That year, the first paperback collection sold close to the same number of copies to comic specialty shops as it did in 2013, the year it was released. Lazarus has been translated into several European languages by Italian publisher Panini Comics and released in hardcover formats containing the same material as the English paperbacks.

== Plot ==
=== Synopsis ===
Lazarus is a coming of age story for a young woman named Forever Carlyle who is questioning her identity. Its major themes are the meaning of "family" and nature versus nurture. It is set in a bleak future a number of decades from now after the current world order has broken down, possibly due to climate change. Sixteen families each control the territory, resources, and technology in their part of the world, as per mutual agreement, though each family has their own technological strengths and may govern their territory through differing methodology. The Carlyle family rules the western half of North America in a feudal system, dividing people into three tiers: "family", "serfs" (skilled laborers), and "waste" (everyone else). The families have formed alliances to protect themselves from other families, and each family has a chosen warrior, trained and modified as per the family's strengths, known as a "Lazarus" who represents them in combat. Forever is the Carlyle Lazarus. She obeys the family patriarch, Malcolm Carlyle, and has four siblings: Steven, Beth, and twins Jonah and Johanna. The original source of the Carlyle's fortune and power is from their various developments in genetic technology. Among other advancements, their modified seeds provide food for most of the world. The Carlyles have also altered their own genetics, which has allowed all of them to grow old without suffering the consequences of age, thereby engendering jealousy and fear in many of the other families.

=== Plot ===
All issues written by Greg Rucka and illustrated by Michael Lark unless otherwise stated.

Issue	Publication date	Plot
#1	Jun. 26, 2013	When Jonah and Johanna plot a coup against Malcolm, one of their first steps is to kill Forever. When she is returning from a diplomatic mission in Morray territory (South America), Carlyle airships fire on Forever and the Morray Lazarus, Joacquim. Neither are killed, and Forever is told by a pilot he was sent by Jonah. Realizing their coup has failed, Johanna arranges for Jonah to appear to have orchestrated it alone. Jonah flees, and Forever receives an anonymous message saying the Carlyles are not her family.
#2	Jul. 24, 2013	
#3	Aug. 28, 2013	
#4	Oct. 2, 2013	
#5	Dec. 11, 2013	Members of the waste class are given the opportunity to be tested for "lifting", and applicants with suitable skills or abilities become serfs. Two youths, Michael Barrett and Casey Solomon, are lifted to become a doctor and soldier respectively. During the lift event in Denver that is attended by thousands, a resistance group who hate the Carlyle family plan to set off a bomb. Forever discovers the plot, but Casey is instrumental in stopping it. Meanwhile, Jonah is captured by the Hock family, a Carlyle rival and ruler of Eastern North America.
#6	Feb. 5, 2014	
#7	Mar. 19, 2014	
#8	Apr. 23, 2014	
#9	Jul. 2, 2014	
#10	Aug. 6, 2014	When Malcolm learns about Jonah's imprisonment by Hock, he calls for a conclave between the families to settle the dispute. Adhering to the Macau Accords that divided the world amongst the families, it takes place within the territory of a neutral family and all the families and their Lazari are present. Forever attends a friendly poker game with the other Lazari and begins a romantic relationship with Joacquim. Malcolm orders Forever to secretly locate Jonah and kill him, but she helps him escape instead. When the conclave begins, Hock invokes a rule allowing his honor to be defended in combat between Forever and another Lazarus. Since Hock does not have a Lazarus of his own, he selects Sonia Bittner, whose family is an ally of his. Despite their friendship, Forever and Sonia battle fiercely. Forever wins, and Malcolm spares Sonia's life. Hock refuses to accept the results and spits poison into Malcolm's face. As the poison begins to take effect, Hock and his allies leave.
#11	Sep. 10, 2014	
#12	Oct 22, 2014	
#13	Nov. 26, 2014	
#14	Jan. 14, 2015	
#15	Feb. 18, 2015	
#16	Apr. 22, 2015	War breaks out along the Carlyle/Hock border, and Forever joins Casey Solomon's squad in an effort to control Duluth, Minnesota. During the battle, Forever is incapacitated and Casey leads the squad to complete the mission. Meanwhile, Michael Barrett works with Beth Carlyle and her partner James to counteract the poison in Malcolm's system, which has left him in a coma. Michael makes the key deduction needed to create an antidote, having realized the poison was designed to attack Carlyle-specific parts of Malcolm's genome, although Malcolm is still bedridden. During this time, Stephen leads the family and the war effort, although he and others are aware he is unfit for the task. Johanna schemes to replace him peacefully. Sonia Bittner, after her defeat at the conclave, was left under the control of the Carlyles. She is kept at a training facility where she accidentally discovers a younger clone of Forever. Sonia learns Forever is also a clone; the seventh one to serve as the Carlyle Lazarus. Neither of the clones is aware of the other, and Sonia is sworn to secrecy.
#17	Jun. 17, 2015	
#18	Jul. 29, 2015	
#19	Sep. 2, 2015	
#20	Nov. 4, 2015	
#21	Dec. 30, 2015	
Sourcebook #1	Apr. 20, 2016	Background information on the Carlyle family
#22	Jun. 15, 2016	The war between Carlyle and Hock grows to include their allies, and Sonia and Joacquim are deployed to fight for Carlyle in Europe. Healed from the wounds she received in Duluth, Forever joins them. During a battle with the Vassalovka family Lazarus, Morray betrays Carlyle and use the cybernetic implants in Joacquim to force him to fight Sonia and Forever against his will. Unable to win, Forever and Sonia retreat. Meanwhile, Stephen transfers power of the Carlyle family to Johanna with Malcolm's consent.
#23	Jul. 20, 2016	
#24	Aug. 31, 2016	
#25	Oct. 12, 2016	
#26	Mar. 29, 2017	
Sourcebook #2	Apr. 26, 2017	Background information on the Hock family
X+66 #1	Jul. 17, 2017	"Special"; Written by Eric Trautmann, Greg Rucka; Illustrated by Steve Lieber
X+66 #2	Aug. 23, 2017	"Binary"; Written by Aaron Duran, Greg Rucka; Illustrated by Mack Chater
X+66 #3	Sep. 27, 2017	"Spark"; Written by Neal Bailey, Greg Rucka; Illustrated by Justin Greenwood
X+66 #4	Nov. 1, 2017	"Zephyr"; Written by Eric Trautmann, Greg Rucka; Illustrated by Alitha Martinez
X+66 #5	Nov. 29, 2017	"Post-Fact"; Written by Eric Trautmann, Greg Rucka; Illustrated by Bilquis Evely
X+66 #6	Feb. 14, 2018	"The Dragon"; Written by Eric Trautmann, Greg Rucka; Illustrated by Tristan Jones
Sourcebook #3	Feb. 21, 2018	Background information on the Vassalovka family
#27	Apr. 18, 2018	A flashback shows Jonah being rescued by a fishing boat in Bittner territory. He is nursed to health by the captain's family and gives them a false name. He falls in love with the captain's daughter and they have a son together. During the war, a disease kills everyone in his new family, but Jonah and his son are unaffected by it.
#28	May 30, 2018	A flashback shows Jonah being rescued by a fishing boat in Bittner territory. He is nursed to health by the captain's family and gives them a false name. He falls in love with the captain's daughter and they have a son together. During the war, a disease kills everyone in his new family, but Jonah and his son are unaffected by it.
Risen #1	Mar. 20, 2019	
Risen #2	Jul. 24, 2019	
Risen #3	Nov. 27, 2019	
Risen #4	Mar. 25, 2020	
Risen #5	Oct. 28, 2020	
Risen #6	Aug. 18, 2021	
Risen #7	Sep. 28, 2022	
Fallen #1	Jun. 25, 2025	
Fallen #2	Jul. 30, 2025	
Fallen #3	Aug. 27, 2025	
Fallen #4	Sep. 24, 2025	
Fallen #5	Oct. 22, 2025	
Fallen #6	Nov. 19, 2025	

== Critical reception ==
Lazarus has received positive reviews since its debut. According to review aggregator Comic Book Roundup, critics gave the first issue an average score of 8.7/10 based on 32 reviews. The series as a whole averages 8.6/10 based on 284 reviews. Critics and fans often praise the world-building in Lazarus, but Lark and Rucka see it as secondary and think it receives too much focus. Publishers Weekly said Forever's "fascinating complexity" made Lazarus stand out from other graphic novels. Writing for ComicsAlliance, KM Bezner said every character, including the diabolical ones, displayed humanity and "[blurred] the lines between shades of morality". On Broken Frontier, Tyler Chin-Tanner described "Lift", the series' second story arc, as "a moving tale of family sacrifice". The series has appeared on many comic critics' "best of" lists.

Forever battles Sonia Bittner during the conclave in issue 15. The art is by Michael Lark and Santi Arcas, based on a choreography video made by Greg Rucka. Arcas' contribution has been praised for adding texture and depth to the image.

Many critics compared Lazarus with other genre works. The timeliness of Rucka's premise made the series stand out among dystopian fiction for IGN reviewer Melissa Grey. Garrett Martin wrote in Paste Magazine that the series was unlike other contemporary class warfare genre fiction like the novels Hunger Games or Blackacre because it is told from the oppressors' point of view. Oliver Sava reviewed the series for The A.V. Club and said it stood out from Image's other science fiction comics "because it's more grounded in current political and economic trends". Rucka specifically addressed fan-drawn parallels to the television series Game of Thrones, saying he had not read the books and purposely avoids watching the show to avoid unintentionally borrowing ideas from it. Lark thinks the comparison to Game of Thrones works to some extent, but points out that Lazarus concentrates more on a single character.

Lark was praised for being equally good at depicting violence and introspection, and Martin said it was Lark's finest work. According to Lark, the characters in Lazarus rarely say what they mean, and some vital story beats are depicted by wordless art. Arcas received notice for adding texture and depth to Lark's art and using pallette changes to help tell the story.

=== Political themes ===
Because of its economic themes, Bezner warned that the political elements of Lazarus would not be for everyone. In The Jersey Journal, critic William Kulesa believed the "deeply considered speculation on society, technology, and the future" is what made the series high-quality science fiction. Chin-Tanner found it to be a character driven story even though it dealt with political and scientific issues, and Newsarama reviewer Vanessa Gabriel felt Lazarus "engages the reader with plausibility". Following the election of Donald Trump as President of the United States in 2016, Salon writer Mark Peters called the series "newly relevant" and compared Trump to the Carlyle family.

In an in-depth review of the series for the Los Angeles Review of Books in 2017, Evan McGarvey praised the research and thought that went into Lazarus, but expressed concern that the visual requirements of the art conflicted with the political themes. He specifically noted the ruling families and their soldiers "simply look cooler" than the waste with whom the audience is meant to identify, and concluded that this dissonance may skew the real message Rucka and Lark want to send. McGarvey went on to compare the Carlyles to the Mercer family and the lift to China's Gaokao.

== Collected editions ==
Trade paperbacks
Title	Material collected	Publication date	ISBN
Lazarus – Volume 1: Family	Lazarus #1–4	October 9, 2013	9781607068099
Lazarus – Volume 2: Lift	Lazarus #5–9	July 30, 2014	9781607068716
Lazarus – Volume 3: Conclave	Lazarus #10–15	March 18, 2015	9781632152251
Lazarus – Volume 4: Poison	Lazarus #16–21	January 27, 2016	9781632155238
Lazarus – Volume 5: Cull	Lazarus #22–26	May 31, 2017	9781534300248
Lazarus: X+66	Lazarus: X+66 #1–6	April 11, 2018	9781534304888
Lazarus: Sourcebook	Lazarus: Sourcebook #1–3	April 25, 2018	9781534305151
Lazarus – Volume 6: Fracture I	Lazarus: Risen #1–3	January 8, 2020	9781534308428
Lazarus – Volume 7: Fracture II	Lazarus #27–28; Lazarus: Risen #5–7	December 13, 2022	9781534319196
Lazarus – Volume 8: Rise	Lazarus: Fallen #1–6	January 20, 2026	9781534332478

Deluxe hardcovers
Title	Material collected	Publication date	ISBN
Lazarus: The First Collection	Lazarus #1–9	November 19, 2014	9781632151834
Lazarus: The Second Collection	Lazarus #10–21	May 18, 2016	9781632157225
Lazarus: The Third Collection	Lazarus #22–26; Lazarus: X+66 #1–6	November 9, 2019	9781534313347
Lazarus: The Fourth Collection	Lazarus #27–28; Lazarus: Risen #1–7	Scheduled for June 3, 2025	9781534325579

== Adaptations in other media ==
=== Television ===
Legendary Television bought the rights to adapt Lazarus following a competitive bidding war in March 2015. Rucka and Lark will be executive producers along with David Manpearl and Matt Tolmach. A pilot script written by Rucka entered its final draft in late 2015 and Legendary began looking for a network willing to purchase it. During the hiatus between issues 21 and 22, Rucka and Lark were able to devote more time to developing the adaptation. Rucka said the development process for Lazarus has been better than any of his previous Hollywood experiences, and that he hopes the show will be able to explore characters more deeply using scenes cut from the book.

In September 2017, Deadline Hollywood reported the adaptation was being developed as a potential series for Amazon Studios, who made a "significant production investment" in it. In the letter column of Lazarus X+66 #4 (November 2017), Rucka said this announcement included some inaccuracies, and emphasized the show is still a long way from being released. He said the casting process had not yet begun.

=== Role playing ===
In the Spring of 2017, Green Ronin Publishing announced The World of Lazarus, a campaign setting in their Modern AGE role-playing game. Although initially planned for a November 2017 release, it was delayed until 2018 to allow more time for development. Rucka said role playing games had an important part in his development as a writer, and that having one of his ideas turned into one "might just possibly be the greatest compliment I could ever receive."
