= Manny Vega =

American painter

- Born: February 10, 1956 (age 70); Bronx, New York
- Website: www.artbyMannyVega.com

Manny Vega (born 1956) is an American painter, illustrator, printmaker, muralist, mosaicist, and set and costume designer. His work portrays the history and traditions of the African Diaspora that exist in the United States, the Caribbean, and Latin America.

== Early life ==
Vega was born in Bronx, New York, in 1956. He joined the artist collective Taller Boricua in 1979 where he studied through 1986. While there he was also a pupil of Harlem printmaker Robert Blackburn at his Printmaking Workshop from 1980 to 1990.

== Works ==
Among Vega's public art projects are a mosaic mural at the Pregones Theater in the Bronx, a mosaic mural portrait of Julia De Burgos in East Harlem, a series of mosaic panels for the 110 street train station, also in East Harlem, as well as a series of painted murals throughout New York City.

For many years, Vega has been teaching visual arts for organizations such as El Museo del Barrio, the Solomon R. Guggenheim Museum, the American Museum of Natural History, and the Caribbean Cultural Center. He has exhibited extensively in the United States, Puerto Rico, and Brazil.

Vega has created set designs and costumes for DanceBrazil and The American Place Theater.

Since 1984, Manny has been traveling to Salvador, Bahia in Brazil, where he has been initiated into the Afro Brazilian temple known as "Ile Iya Omi Ase Iya Masse". As a member of the temple, his creative talents have been utilized to create some of the most elaborate ritual costumes and accessories. His work in this medium has been documented by the Fowler Museum of UCLA, the Smithsonian, as well as Dartmouth College. This body of work has been documented in the book, Beads, Body, and Soul: Art and Light in the Yoruba Universe, as well as the book, The Yoruba Artist.

His current focus is to create a series of mosaic projects, based on study of classic Byzantine mosaic fabrication, to adopt this style to modern day imagery, which he calls "Byzantine Hip Hop". Vega has a studio on 103rd Street in East Harlem.

== Personal life ==
Vega was married to his wife Anna Araiz who died of brain cancer in October 2001. She has been the subject matter of several of his pieces.
