= Philip Tan =

Comic artist (born 1978)

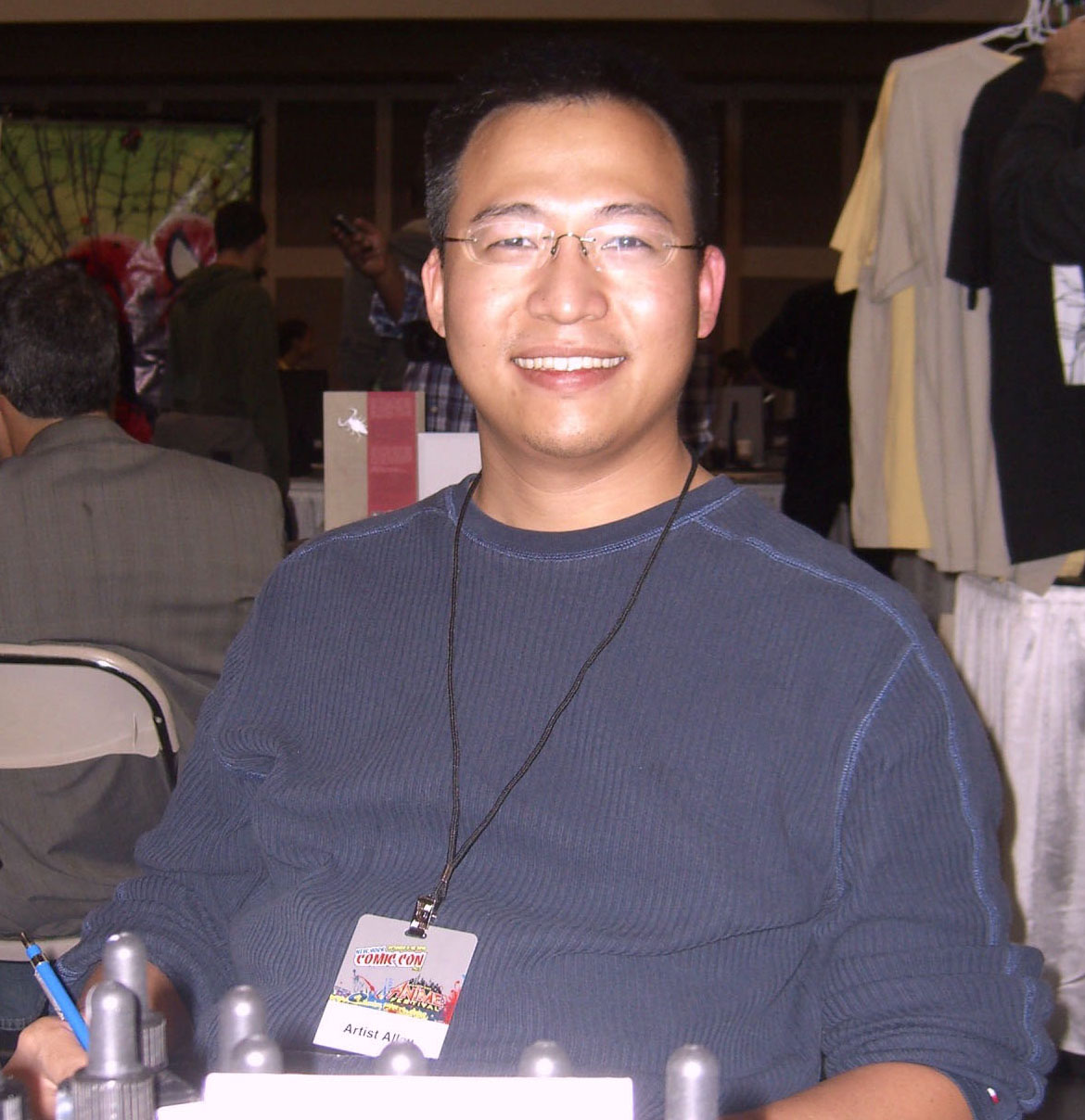
- Born: 1978 (age 47–48) Manila, Philippines
- Areas: Penciller, Artist, Inker
- Notable works: The Avengers

Philip Tan (born 1978) is a comic book writer/artist best known for his work on Spawn, Uncanny X-Men and Iron Man.

== Career ==
Tan graduated at the University of Santo Tomas with a Bachelor's Degree in Architecture.

Tan was the penciller of Final Crisis: Revelations as well as the "Agent Orange" Green Lantern story arc, which started in Green Lantern #39 and ran through issue 42.

Following Agent Orange he will be penciling the second three issue arc of Grant Morrison's Batman and Robin series with issue 6 being his last.

Tan has illustrated cards for the Magic: The Gathering collectible card game.

In 2011 Tan was the artist on Hawkman, which was part of DC Comics' company-wide title relaunch, The New 52.

In 2016, Philip Tan worked on the new Suicide Squad Rebirth series co-drawing with Jim Lee.

In 2022, Philip Tan began work on Ronin Book 2 (with Frank Miller and Daniel Henriquez).

== Bibliography ==
- Iron Man, vol. 3, #79-82 (with John Jackson Miller, Marvel Comics, 2004)
- Batman and Robin #4-6 (with Grant Morrison, DC Comics, 2009)

=== Covers ===
- Uncanny X-Men #422-434 (2003–2004)
- Spawn #150-162 (2005–2007)
- Green Lantern (Vol.4) #39C/0913 & #40-42
- Outsiders (2010) #26-29
- Ronin Book 2 (Nov 2022-Current) (with Frank Miller and Daniel Henriquez)
