= Wonder Woman: The Hiketeia =

2002 graphic novel by Greg Rucka with art by J. G. Jones

- Cover of Wonder Woman: The Hiketeia.

Publication information
- Publisher: DC Comics
- Format: Graphic novel
- Publication date: 2002
- Main character(s): Wonder Woman, Batman

Creative team
- Written by: Greg Rucka
- Artist: J. G. Jones

Wonder Woman: The Hiketeia is a graphic novel written by Greg Rucka with art by J. G. Jones. The work marked Rucka's first outing with the character, before he became the writer on the ongoing Wonder Woman series one year later. It was released in hardcover in 2002, and in paperback a year later.

== Production ==
Before he started his three-year run on Wonder Woman (volume 2), with #195 in 2003, Greg Rucka started his work on the character a year before that in the one-shot Wonder Woman: The Hiketeia. Even as one of his favorite characters, Rucka made a point that getting inside Wonder Woman's head was "murderous", so for the graphic novel, he decided not to let it be about Wonder Woman, but rather about how she was perceived, a method he continued to employ in his run on the ongoing series.

Compared to his later work, The Hiketeia offered a very limited presentation of Wonder Woman, focusing on what Rucka himself considered only one facet of the character. By presenting the work as a tragedy, Rucka meant to reveal Wonder Woman's more ineffectual - given the untenable situation - and somber sides. His work on the ongoing series allowed for more varied circumstances, and therefore more facets of Wonder Woman.

== Synopsis ==
Wonder Woman: The Hiketeia is a modern Greek tragedy of duty and vengeance. When Wonder Woman partakes in an ancient ritual called the Hiketeia, she is honor-bound to eternally protect and care for a young woman named Danielle Wellys. But when Wonder Woman learns that Danielle has killed the sex-slavers/drug dealers who murdered her sister, she suddenly finds herself in battle with Batman, who is searching for the fugitive. The Erinyes also threaten retribution if the Hiketeia is not honored. Caught in a no-win situation, Wonder Woman must choose between breaking a sacred oath and turning her back on justice.

== Reaction ==
Released in 2002, the graphic novel was well received both by fans and critics. Comics Worth Reading considered it to be "the best Wonder Woman story". Readers gave praise for Rucka's treatment of Diana as a real person, not an idealized caricature of all womanhood, capturing her voice as an Amazon and a foreign princess who was not aloof or reserved. Instead, her depiction was praised for showing Diana as caring, thoughtful, capable of reflection (without self-absorption) and even humor. The artwork was also praised, with one reviewer using the panel in which Batman is hurled from a second story balcony by Wonder Woman's punch as an example.
