= Atticus Kodiak =

Character in novels by Greg Rucka

Atticus Kodiak is the fictional protagonist of a series of novels written by Greg Rucka. The series concerns Atticus's career as a professional bodyguard.

== Novels featuring Atticus Kodiak ==
=== Keeper ===
First in the series (1996). Atticus is hired to protect a woman who will speak at an abortion conference.

=== Finder ===
Second in the series (1997). Atticus tries to protect the runaway daughter of his former commanding officer.

=== Smoker ===
Third in the series (1998). Atticus gets a chance to rehabilitate his reputation as a bodyguard when he is hired to protect a witness in a high-profile tobacco lawsuit.

=== Shooting At Midnight ===
Fourth in the series (1999). Atticus merely guest-stars as Rucka turns most of the narration duties over to Bridgett Logan, Atticus's ex-girlfriend. Bridgett must deal with the demons of her past when a close friend asks Bridgett to help her murder someone.

=== Critical Space ===
Fifth in the series (2001). While guarding a British Royal, Atticus is offered a job by the expert assassin known only as "Drama".

=== Patriot Acts ===
Sixth in the series (2007), the story involves the aftermath of the climax of Critical Space and follows Atticus and Drama over the next three years as they seek revenge for several attempts on their lives.

=== Walking Dead ===
Seventh entry in the series (2009). While living in hiding with Alena ("Drama" in earlier titles), Atticus witnesses the murder of a neighbor family and kidnapping of their daughter. In effort to find the missing girl, Atticus must infiltrate the seedy world of international human trafficking.

=== Major characters ===
==== Atticus Kodiak ====
Born in San Francisco, Atticus was well-trained as a bodyguard in the Army's Executive Protection program, and he now relies on that training in his career as a personal security consultant (or bodyguard) in New York City. The series follows Atticus as he attempts to establish himself professionally and stabilize his often rocky personal life. This is difficult, however, since his profession and personal relationships are often intertwined.

==== Bridgett Logan ====
Atticus' most complicated romantic relationship is with Bridgett Logan, a private investigator. Bridie's tough exterior hides her emotional vulnerability and dangerous past. She is a devotee of Porsches, Life Savers, and Altoids, and she takes center stage in the novel Shooting At Midnight, which reveals Bridie's past as a heroin addict. When Bridgett feels obligated to help out a friend accused of murder, she finds that old habits are the hardest to break.

==== Natalie Trent ====
Natalie is a professional bodyguard specializing in sniper and counter-sniper work. Thanks to her father, Elliot Trent, she is very well-off, although she does not get along with him. Atticus acknowledges that she is the best bodyguard in the group, even better than himself.

==== Elliot Trent ====
The owner of Sentinel, a large Manhattan-based security firm. He is Natalie's father.

==== Erika Wyatt ====
Erika is the teenage daughter of Atticus' former commanding officer from his days in the Army. Atticus becomes her legal guardian, and she lives with him for several years before moving out to attend New York University (NYU). Atticus regards her as a sister, and his only family.

==== Robert Moore ====
Moore first appears as an operative of the SAS, but later leaves the service to become the personal bodyguard of a minor British Royal. He develops a close friendship with Atticus.

==== Scott Fowler ====
When Atticus requires contact with Federal authorities, he tends to contact Special Agent Scott Fowler, who Atticus's old friend used to call "Special Agent Dude."

==== "Drama" ====
"Drama" is the code-name for a highly talented female assassin who comes to respect Atticus' skills, character, and determination.

== Other stories set in the world of Atticus Kodiak ==
There are no other stories overtly connected to the Kodiak series, other than the seven official novels. However, there are multiple stories that take place in the same fictional world by virtue of minor shared characters.

=== A Fistful of Rain ===
A Fistful of Rain (2003) stars Miriam "Mim" Bracca, a rock star with a troubled past, who returns home from a tour to have her life derailed by a stalking voyeur and a murder. Rucka has revealed "there's a very oblique link between Critical Space and Fistful - so oblique, in fact, just about everyone in the world missed it, I think. So the Kodiak universe is, in fact, the same universe as Mim Bracca's."

=== "Contact and Cover" ===
"Contact and Cover" (2008) is a short story starring Tracy Hoffman, one of the detectives from A Fistful of Rain. It was published in the Michael Connelly edited collection, The Blue Religion.

=== Stumptown ===
Stumptown is a modern-day Detective fiction comic book that follows the cases of Dex Parios, a P.I. in Portland, Oregon. The second storyline of the series has Dex working a case for Mim Bracca, the star of A Fistful of Rain, thereby establishing its setting as that of the world of Atticus Kodiak.
