= Steve Rolston =

Canadian artist and writer

- Born: Steve Rolston; February 8, 1978 (age 48) Vancouver, British Columbia, Canada
- Areas: Writer, Artist, Storyboard Artist, Director
- Notable works: Queen & Country; Pounded; Mek; One Bad Day; The Escapists; Emiko Superstar; The Last Kids on Earth
- Awards: Eisner Award; Cybils Award; Daytime Emmy Awards; Leo Awards

Steve Rolston (born February 8, 1978) is a Canadian artist and writer of comic books and graphic novels currently living in Vancouver, British Columbia. After working in story boards for various animated series, he got his first break from Oni Press as the penciler and inker of the first four issues of their on-going Queen & Country comic series by praised author Greg Rucka. From 2005 to 2017, Rolston taught a course at Vancouver Institute of Media Arts entitled "Introduction to Comic Book Production".

== Biography ==
Born in Vancouver, British Columbia, Rolston was raised in Pender Harbour on the Sunshine Coast.

== Bibliography ==
Comics

- Assorted Meats (1996, Biohazard Publishing)
- Jack Spade and Tony Two-Fist (2000, Cartoon Militia)
- Queen & Country #1-4, 25 (with Greg Rucka, 2001, Oni Press)
- Gumbo #2 (2001, Syndicate Publishing)
- Jingle Belle Jubilee one-shot (with Paul Dini, 2001, Oni Press)
- 9-11: Artists Respond (2002, Dark Horse Comics)
- Oni Press Color Special (with Sabina, 2002, Oni Press)
- Pounded (with Brian Wood, 2002, Oni Press)
- Mek (with Warren Ellis, 2003, WildStorm)
- One Bad Day (2003, Oni Press)
- Sidekicks Super Fun Summer Special (with J. Torres, 2003, Oni Press)
- Lost Souls in Love (2004)
- Four Letter Worlds (with Jay Faerber, 2005, Image Comics)
- The Escapists (with Brian K Vaughan, 2006, Dark Horse Comics)
- Tales of the TMNT #28 (with Stephen Murphy, 2006, Mirage)
- Little Ghost (2006)
- Degrassi: Extra Credit vol. 4 (with J Torres, 2007, Fenn / Simon & Schuster)
- House of Mystery #4 (with Matthew Sturges, 2008, Vertigo)
- Emiko Superstar (with Mariko Tamaki, 2008, Minx)
- You Ain't No Dancer #3 (with Sabina, 2008, New Reliable Press)
- Seeing Red (with Cora Lee, 2009, Annick Press)
- Ghost Projekt (with Joe Harris, 2010, Oni Press)
- Great Motion Mission (with Tanya Lloyd Kyi, 2012, Annick Press)
- The Graphic Canon Volume 3 (with Ernest Hemingway, 2013, Seven Stories Press)
- Public Relations #6-11 (with Matthew Sturges & Dave Justus, 2016, Devil's Due/1First Comics)
- Everafter #6 (with Dave Justus, Lilah Sturges & Ande Parks, 2017, Vertigo)
- Japanese Vending Machines (2018, Gumroad)

== Filmography ==
Television

Year	Title	Role
1998	Ed, Edd 'n Eddy	Storyboard Artist
1999	Sabrina: The Animated Series	Storyboard Artist
1999	PB&J Otter	Storyboard Artist
1999	Rescue Heroes	Storyboard Artist
2015	Marvel Super Hero Adventures: Frost Fight!	Storyboard Artist
2015–2016	Littlest Pet Shop	Storyboard Artist
2016–2018	Avengers Assemble	Storyboard Artist
2017	Minecraft Miniseries: Challenge of the Spooky Isles	Writer, Director
2018	Minecraft Miniseries: Mystery of the Greek Isles	Director
2018	Cupcake & Dino: General Services	Storyboard Supervisor
2019–2020	The Last Kids on Earth	Storyboard Director, Series Director
2022	My Little Pony: Make Your Mark	Storyboard Director
2024	Zombies: The Re-Animated Series	Series Director

== Awards and nominations ==
- 2002 - Eisner Award: Best New Series (for Queen & Country, with Greg Rucka)
- 2002 - Eisner Award (nomination): Best Continuing Series (for Queen & Country, with Greg Rucka)
- 2002 - Eisner Award (nomination): Best Serialized Story (for Queen & Country #1-4: Operation: Broken Ground, with Greg Rucka)
- 2002 - Russ Manning Most Promising Newcomer Award (nomination)
- 2008 - Cybils Award: Best Young Adult Graphic Novel (for Emiko Superstar, with Mariko Tamaki)
- 2009 - Joe Shuster Award (nomination): Comics for Kids (for Emiko Superstar, with Mariko Tamaki)
- 2009 - Joe Shuster Award (nomination): Outstanding Comic Book Artist
- 2010 - Science in Society Book Award (honorable mention): Youth Book under 16 Years
- 2020 - Daytime Emmy Awards: Best Outstanding Special Class Animated Program (for The Last Kids on Earth)
- 2020 - Leo Awards: Best Animated Program (for The Last Kids on Earth)
- 2025 - Leo Awards (nomination): Best Direction - Animation Series (for Zombies: The Re-Animated Series)
