= Queen & Country =

American comic book series

- Queen & Country #1 (March 2001). Art by Tim Sale.

Publication information
- Publisher: Oni Press
- Schedule: Monthly
- Format: Ongoing series
- Genre: , spy, techno-thriller
- Publication date: March 2001 – August 2007
- No. of issues: 32

Creative team
- Created by: Greg Rucka
- Written by: Greg Rucka

Collected editions
- Broken Ground: ISBN 978-1-929998-21-0

Queen & Country is an American comic book published by Oni Press and written by Greg Rucka with various artists illustrating.

It was inspired by the British ITV television series The Sandbaggers (1978–1980), which was created and primarily written by Ian Mackintosh. Mackintosh is heavily praised in an essay by Rucka in Issue #1 of Queen & Country.

== Publication history ==
The first series began in March 2001 and ran for 32 issues, finishing in August 2007.

Three Queen & Country: Declassified spin-off mini-series have also been published, the first two written by Rucka and the third by Antony Johnston under Rucka's supervision. They deal specifically with the past missions of various characters. Events of the first Declassified miniseries in particular influence what happens in later issues of the main series; it is best read before "Operation Stormfront".

Translated editions of the collected volumes are available in Polish, French and German, and several volumes are available in Spanish.

== Plot ==
The series is centered on Tara Chace, an operative of the Special Operations Section of SIS, known as the Minders. It attempts to portray the bureaucracy and politics which the agents deal with realistically, as well as including the dangerous missions typical of the spy genre.

Other recurring characters in the series alongside Tara Chace include Director of Operations Paul Crocker, Deputy Chief of Service Donald Weldon, Chief of Service Frances Barclay (known as "C"), Mission Control Officer and Main Communications Officer Alexis and former Head of Special Section Tom Wallace.

== Storylines ==
- Operation: Broken Ground

(Queen & Country #1–4)
Written by Greg Rucka. Art by Steve Rolston.

- Operation: Morningstar

(Queen & Country #5–7)
Written by Greg Rucka. Art by Brian Hurtt, Bryan Lee O'Malley, and Christine Norrie.

- Operation: Crystal Ball

(Queen & Country #8–12)
Written by Greg Rucka. Art by Leandro Fernández.

- Operation: Blackwall

Queen & Country #13–15)
Written by Greg Rucka. Art by Jason Shawn Alexander.

- Operation: Stormfront

(Queen & Country #16–20)
Written by Greg Rucka. Art by Carla Speed McNeil.

- Operation: Dandelion

(Queen & Country #21–24)
Written by Greg Rucka. Art by Mike Hawthorne.

- Untitled

(Queen & Country #25)
Written by Greg Rucka. Art by Steve Rolston and Mike Norton.

- Operation: Saddlebags

(Queen & Country #26–28)
Written by Greg Rucka. Art by Mike Norton and Steve Rolston.

- Operation: Red Panda

(Queen & Country #29–32)
Written by Greg Rucka. Art by Chris Samnee.

== Collected editions ==
- Queen & Country:
  - Operation: Broken Ground (collects Queen & Country #1–4 and Oni Press Color Special 2001 #1, 120 pages, April 2002, ISBN 1-929998-21-X)
  - Operation: Morningstar (collects Queen & Country #5–7, 88 pages, October 2002, ISBN 1-929998-35-X)
  - Operation: Crystal Ball (collects Queen & Country #8–12, 152 pages, January 2003, ISBN 1-929998-49-X)
  - Operation: Blackwall (collects Queen & Country #13–15, 88 pages, November 2003, ISBN 1-929998-68-6)
  - Operation: Storm Front (collects Queen & Country #16–20, 168 pages, April 2004, ISBN 1-929998-84-8)
  - Operation: Dandelion (collects Queen & Country #21–24, 128 pages, August 2004, ISBN 1-929998-97-X)
  - Operation: Saddlebags (collects Queen & Country #25–28, 144 pages, May 2005, ISBN 1-932664-14-9)
  - Operation: Red Panda (collects Queen & Country #29–32, 144 pages, June 2007, ISBN 1-932664-65-3)
- Queen & Country: Declassified:
  - Volume 1 (88 pages August 2003, ISBN 1-929998-58-9)
  - Volume 2 (96 pages May 2006, ISBN 1-932664-28-9)
  - Volume 3 (96 pages May 2006, ISBN 1-932664-35-1)
- Queen & Country The Definitive Edition:
  - Volume 1 (collects Queen & Country #1–12 and Oni Press Color Special 2001 #1, 376 pages, November 2007, ISBN 1-932664-87-4)
  - Volume 2 (collects Queen & Country #13–24, 344 pages, April 2008, ISBN 1-932664-89-0)
  - Volume 3 (collects Queen & Country #25–32, Script-book #1, 408 pages, July 2008, ISBN 1-932664-96-3)
  - Volume 4 (collects Queen & Country: Declassified Volumes 1–3, 296 pages, April 2009, ISBN 1-934964-13-1)

== Awards ==
- 2002:
  - Won "Best New Series" Eisner Award
  - Nominated for "Best Continuing Series" Eisner Award
  - Nominated for "Best Serialized Story" Eisner Award, for Queen & Country #1–4: "Operation: Broken Ground"
- 2003: Nominated for "Best Serialized Story" Eisner Award, for Queen & Country #8–12: "Operation: Crystal Ball"
- 2004:
  - Nominated for "Best Continuing Series" Eisner Award
  - Nominated for "Best Serialized Story" Eisner Award, for Queen & Country #13–15: "Operation: Blackwall"

== Other media ==
=== Novels ===
A Queen & Country prose novel written by Rucka, A Gentleman's Game, was published in 2004, also featuring Tara Chace and making reference to the events of the comic book series. A second Tara Chace novel, Private Wars, was published in 2005. The novels tie in to the comic series; issue 29 to 32 depicts events immediately after A Gentleman's Game. Private Wars takes place a few months after the end of the comic series and ends the first volume of the series. A third Queen & Country novel, The Last Run, was released in October 2010.

=== Scriptbook ===
A scriptbook, titled "Queen & Country Scriptbook vol. 1", is also available (ISBN 1929998929).

=== Film ===
A film adaptation is in development, but has been stranded in development hell for some time. On September 9, 2013, Elliot Page was reported to be in negotiations to star in the film, and in March 2014 Craig Viveiros was set to direct the film. In March 2018, Ridley Scott is in talks to direct the film the project. On 19 June 2018, Sylvia Hoeks was rumored to be Tara Chace. The project is in limbo due to the acquisition of 21st Century Fox by Disney.
