= Final Crisis: Revelations =

Comic book limited series

- Variant cover of Final Crisis: Revelations vol. 1, 1, art by Philip Tan

Publication information
- Publisher: DC Comics
- Genre: Superhero
- Publication date: October 2008 — January 2009
- No. of issues: 5
- Main character(s): The Spectre; The Question II; The Radiant; The Huntress

Creative team
- Written by: Greg Rucka
- Penciller: Philip Tan
- Inker(s): Jeff De Los Santos; Jonathan Glapion
- Letterer: John J. Hill
- Colorist(s): Jonathan Glapion; Ian Hannin; Nei Ruffino
- Editor(s): Eddie Berganza; Adam Schlagman

Collected editions
- Hardcover: ISBN 1-84856-351-5
- Paperback: ISBN 1401223230

Final Crisis: Revelations is a five-issue comic book limited series written by Greg Rucka, with art by Philip Tan, Jeff De Los Santos, and Jonathan Glapion.

It was nominated for "Outstanding Comic Book" in the GLAAD Media Awards.

== Outline ==
Grant Morrison, writer of the main Final Crisis series, asked if Geoff Johns and Greg Rucka would write the two main "companion" limited series. Johns began work on Final Crisis: Legion of Three Worlds, while Rucka began work on a project with the in-house name "Street Crisis", a look at how Final Crisis affected the DC Universe at a street level. However, Rucka concluded that this would not provide sufficient material for a full miniseries.

Rucka discussed the project with DC executive editor Dan DiDio. Eventually, they decided to have the miniseries focus on two of Rucka's most notable characters: Renee Montoya (who had recently become the Question) and Crispus Allen (who had recently become the Spectre), Rucka said that he and DiDio had realised "you can't really have a 'Crisis' in the DC Universe without The Spectre playing a fairly substantial part."

In interviews Rucka has stated that the core of this series will deal with Crispus Allen struggling with his position as the Spectre, noting that unlike other Spectre hosts, Allen is deeply dissatisfied with his situation, in large part because his first assignment was the killing of his own son.

DC Universe #0 had a one-page promo for the series showing Dr. Light, with a large caption stating "SHOW NO MERCY".

The story, in large part, takes place in Gotham City on the day that the Anti-Life Equation is unleashed in Final Crisis #3.

== Plot summary ==
Following the murder of the Martian Manhunter, Crispus Allen, the Spectre, exacts justice on the ones responsible. He kills Doctor Light, melts Effigy, and even slays the Hangmen before they can join the Secret Society of Super Villains. He then goes after Libra, the new head of the Secret Society; however, the Spectre is unable to discern Libra's real name, and the villain is capable of fighting against the Spectre with ease. For the first time, this new Spectre must concede defeat, a fact which only adds to Allen's increasing disillusionment with the role.

At the same time, Renee Montoya is hunting down the members of the Religion of Crime, who have sworn to kill her for denying her role as their leader. They are looking for the Spear of Destiny. As Renee tries to fight off the members when they do find the Spear, the Spectre arrives to judge her. He teleports her away—causing her to drop the Spear—to see Batwoman one last time and then to the Bat-Signal to receive her judgment. However, he is stopped from enacting vengeance of Renee by the arrival of The Radiant, the Spirit of Mercy. The Spectre becomes agitated at the sight of her, and strikes her, only for the Radiant to literally turn the other cheek. Crispus demands to know where God's mercy was when he took his son's life. The Radiant reverts to her human identity of Sister Clarice—a nun who had earlier died in a hospital bed after being severely beaten—and confronts Crispus about the importance and power of his role as the Spectre, and how he has used that power only in a superficial way.

Shortly thereafter, the Anti-Life Equation is unleashed across the world. A corrupted Gotham City police force led by Maggie Sawyer emerge from the GCPD headquarters and attempt to unleash the equation on Renee. The Spectre holds the brainwashed police off while Radiant teleports Renee away. The Radiant attempts to use her powers to calm the brainwashed people, but finds they have no effect. Renee finds a brainwashed Batwoman at her location and is badly beaten. She is saved from death by the Spectre and the Radiant. The three retreat to a nearby church, taking in citizens who had escaped the Anti-Life brainwashing. Once inside, the Radiant uses her powers to heal Renee's wounds. Crispus and Sister Clarice debate over the lack of power they have in the present situation, and whether God has abandoned them, or worse, is allowing these events to happen. Sister Clarice points out three men to Renee, whom she states had killed her. Distressed at the Spectre not being called to take vengeance upon them, she confronts them as the Radiant. The men, terrified at what she has become, beg for mercy; she replies by saying she does not know if she can give it.

Meanwhile, the Religion of Crime's ringleader Sister Wrack confronts Vandal Savage in a dilapidated hut. Sister Wrack impales Vandal Savage on the Spear, revealing him as Cain. Cain lead his acolytes towards Gotham, where he intends to revenge himself against the Spectre in retaliation for the curse he once inflicted on him. Arriving at the church, the Cain defeats the Spectre in hand-to-hand combat and stabs him through with the Spear of Destiny, enslaving the Spectre and separating Crispus from him. Realizing that the Spear is ineffective against Renee, he attempts instead to impale her with it, but she is saved by the Huntress. The Radiant uses the momentary distraction to bring Huntress, Renee, and Crispus's body back into the church, where her power prevents Cain and his hordes from entering. Inside the church, the Radiant reveals the reason why she and the Spectre are so powerless; it is because the conflict is over God's greatest gift to humanity: their free will, which means only the choices of humanity can decide the outcome.

The Radiant leaves the church to confront Cain, who attempts to bargain with her, offering to kill the men who murdered her human host in return for the safety of all the others inside the church. The Radiant refuses, and Cain, in retaliation, forces the Spectre to recite the Anti-Life Equation, which unmakes creation itself, and reconstitutes the world in Darkseid's name. The Radiant's faith begins to waver, causing her protection over the church to weaken. Renee and Huntress launch a desperate final charge in an attempt to regain the Spear of Destiny. Huntress is stabbed by the enthralled Catwoman, and Renee is restrained by Batwoman. Crispus, still there in spirit, despairs of the dire situation, and leaves the area, going to his son's grave. Cain stabs Renee with the Spear of Destiny, and at the same time is tackled by the men who killed Sister Clarice, which gives Renee the chance to take the Spear. With the Spear away from Cain, the Radiant's faith and strength is renewed, and she heals Huntress's wounds. However, she cannot heal Renee until she purifies the corrupted Spear, by using it to "heal a soul rather than destroy one." Renee chooses to bring peace to Crispus by means of an unspoken gift.

Invigorated by God's allowance of Renee's gift, Crispus returns and reunites with—and thereby frees—the Spectre, who uses the Spear's power to restore the world and casts absolute judgment upon Cain's followers. At the same time, the Radiant sees that the men who killed Sister Clarice have been mortally wounded by Cain, and she grants them her forgiveness as they die ("That is why God forbade me to punish them," the Spectre tells her, "that they might truly earn your mercy.") The Spectre, though unable to kill Cain, deals him a terrible punishment: he casts him out into the world, unable to hide his mark, where he will be forever hated and reviled by mankind, finding "no peace nor safety until God grants [him] otherwise." Thanking Renee for all her help, the Spectre and the Radiant move on to their next mission.

The story closes with a scene of a resurrected Jake Allen returning home to his family—the "gift" Renee made to heal Crispus' soul.

== Collected editions ==
The series has been collected into a single volume:

- Final Crisis: Revelations (collects Final Crisis: Revelations #1–5 and Final Crisis: Secret Files and Origins #1. 168 pages, hardcover, August 2009, ISBN 1-84856-351-5; paperback, August 2010, ISBN 1-4012-2323-0)
