= Gotham Central =

Comic-book series

- Cover of Gotham Central #1, art by Michael Lark.

Publication information
- Publisher: DC Comics
- Schedule: Monthly
- Genre: Crime; Police procedural; Superhero
- Publication date: December 2002 – April 2006
- No. of issues: 40
- Main character: Gotham City Police Department

Creative team
- Created by: Greg Rucka, Ed Brubaker, Michael Lark

Collected editions
- In the Line of Duty: ISBN 1-4012-0199-7
- Half a Life: ISBN 1401204384
- Unresolved Targets: ISBN 1563899957
- The Quick and the Dead: ISBN 1401209122
- Dead Robin: ISBN 1401213294

Gotham Central is a police procedural comic-book series that was published by the comic book publishing company DC Comics. It was written by Ed Brubaker and Greg Rucka, with pencils initially by Michael Lark. The story focused on the Gotham City Police Department and the difficulties of its officers living and working in Gotham City, home of Batman.

Greg Rucka and Ed Brubaker collaborated on the "Officer Down" Batman crossover. They wanted to do a series about the police in Gotham City and finally obtained approval from DC executives. The writers wanted Michael Lark for pencils and waited nearly a year to get him onboard due to scheduling, but used the opportunity to plan out the storylines. They plotted out the new series' elements and decided to script the first story arc together, then split the lengthy cast into two shifts: Rucka would write the GCPD's day shift storylines, Brubaker would take the night shift, and Lark would pencil them both. Gotham Central's debut yielded Eisner Award nominations in 2003 for Best New Series, Best Writer (Rucka), Best Writer (Brubaker), and Best Penciller/Inker (Lark).

== Publication history ==
Renee Montoya is outed, art by Michael Lark.

=== Sales problems ===
Gotham Central repeatedly failed to break the top 100 comics in sales. Despite this, DC Comics were encouraged by the improved sales of the trade paperback collected editions. In an interview, Ed Brubaker stated that the book sold well and was never in danger of cancellation, outselling almost all of Vertigo's books at the time. Lark and Brubaker moved on to other projects, and, after three years of publication, the series ended amid the aftermath of Infinite Crisis. It continued to have sales troubles through to the conclusion: issue #37 ranked 102nd place, and issue #38 ranked 120th place on the distributor's charts.

=== End of the series ===
Despite the series' sales, Greg Rucka assured that DC would have continued publishing Gotham Central as long as he wanted to write it and that it was his decision to conclude the series. Rucka felt that the book was a co-creation between himself, Lark and Brubaker and when they left, with issue #25 and #37 respectively, it was time to move on. The year-long break provided by the Infinite Crisis event provided an opportune place to close out the main storylines. At one point, Rucka was in talks to replace Gotham Central with a new series called Streets of Gotham, which would focus on Renee Montoya as a private investigator. Those plans were scrapped in favor of making Montoya a major character in the weekly series 52, with Rucka as a co-writer. In 2009, DC released an unrelated series called Batman: Streets of Gotham that has been described as a mixture of Gotham Central and another canceled Batman series, Batman: Gotham Knights.

== Cast of characters ==
The Gotham Central cast was divided between the day and night shifts, with arcs alternating between both sets of characters. Main characters among the ranks of the detectives were Marcus Driver, Romy Chandler, Renee Montoya, Crispus Allen and Josephine "Josie Mac" MacDonald. Their superiors, Commissioner Michael Akins, Captain Margaret "Maggie" Sawyer and Lieutenant Ron Probson also appeared prominently. Jim Corrigan, a corrupt CSI, features near the end of the series.

The supporting cast was mainly pulled from the large roster of the Gotham City Police Department and some characters were subjects of their own story arcs. Long-time supporting characters of Batman, James Gordon and Harvey Bullock, also made recurring appearances. Batman himself, although not often seen, played a prominent role in the series.

== Stories/story arcs ==
Title	Issues	Writer	Artist	Synopsis/Notes
"In The Line of Duty"	#1–2	Ed Brubaker, Greg Rucka	Michael Lark	Marcus Driver's partner Charlie is killed by Mr. Freeze while the pair are investigating a lead, making the MCU (Major Crimes Unit) aware of a bigger plot by Freeze.
"Motive"	#3–5	Brubaker	Lark	The MCU investigate the late Charlie Fields' unsolved case, involving the murder of a teenage girl and the villain Firebug.
"Half a Life"	#6–10	Rucka	Lark	Renee Montoya is outed at the station as a lesbian and finds her work environment and personal life turned upside down. The Batman villain Two-Face appears in this arc, having fallen in love with Montoya and kidnapped her.
"Daydreams and believers"	#11	Brubaker	Brian Hurtt	A story told from the point of view of MCU temp Stacy as she writes to her friend Meg about her life in the MCU and her fantasies (including romantic fantasies about Batman).
"Soft Targets"	#12–15	Brubaker, Rucka	Lark, Stefano Gaudiano	The cops of Gotham find themselves literally under fire from the Joker, as he begins sniping both police and civilians in his murderous campaign. Every second becomes valuable; as to further the damage, the Joker has made a website featuring streaming webcam footage from his next position.
"Life is Full of Disappointments"	#16–18	Brubaker, Rucka	Greg Scott	A murder investigation is passed between three different sets of detectives across the three issues, allowing a glimpse into the various lives of the detectives. This story also features the Huntress.
"Unresolved"	#19–22	Brubaker	Lark, Gaudiano	An old murder case involving the Mad Hatter is reopened, but the now-disgraced Harvey Bullock suspects that the Penguin is involved.
"Corrigan"	#23–24	Rucka	Lark, Gaudiano	Crispus Allen's job is threatened after corrupt Jim Corrigan removes evidence from a scene. This story also features the death of Batman villain Black Spider and ties into the Batman War Games crossover.
"Lights Out"	#25	Rucka	Lark, Gaudiano	At Akins' orders, the Bat-Signal is removed from Gotham Central after the events of War Games, which lead the MCU to (further) distrust Batman.
"On The Freak Beat"	#26–27	Brubaker	Jason Alexander	A murder investigation in which Catwoman is a suspect is further complicated when Catwoman learns about Detective Josie Mac's psychic powers, a secret she has kept from the others at the MCU. This story also features Slam Bradley.
"Keystone Kops"	#28–31	Rucka	Gaudiano, Kano	An officer is transformed into a monster after an accident involving an old laboratory belonging to the Flash villain Doctor Alchemy. Dr. Alchemy later changes the composition of Renee Montoya's necklace, causing it to permanently scar her chest with the dual venus symbol.
"Nature"	#32	Rucka	Steve Lieber	A story told from the perspective of one of the many corrupt police officers of Gotham City. This story features the character Poison Ivy.
"Dead Robin"	#33–36	Brubaker, Rucka	Kano, Gaudiano	A boy's body is found, wearing a Robin costume. The MCU must assume that the boy really is Robin, and Batman becomes a major suspect. This story also features the Teen Titans.
"Sunday Bloody Sunday"	#37	Rucka	Lieber	Tying into the events of Infinite Crisis, this story features Crispus Allen trying to get home to his family in a disaster-stricken Gotham City. This issue also features Captain Marvel and the death of the Fisherman.
"Corrigan II"	#38–40	Rucka	Kano, Gaudiano	Allen goes after the corrupt Jim Corrigan, only to be killed. Corrigan uses his connections and well-placed lies to get off clean, persuading a disgusted Montoya to leave the force.

== Characters after the series' end ==
- Michael Akins left the force under unknown circumstances during the one-year gap with James Gordon taking back the role of Police Commissioner. It is implied that Akins had either become corrupt himself, or had done nothing to curb corruption in the GCPD.
- Following his death, Crispus Allen became the Spectre during the events of Infinite Crisis. He was briefly turned into a Black Lantern before regaining the Spectre mantle.
- Renee Montoya became one of the major characters in 52, a series dealing with the aftermath of Infinite Crisis. During the series she takes up the guise of the Question.
- Josie Mac and Maggie Sawyer have also appeared in minor roles in 52 and both have made sporadic appearances in Batman-related comic books, with Sawyer eventually becoming a prominent member of Kate Kane's supporting cast. Sawyer and Kane later married.
- Marcus Driver and Josh Azeveda appeared in the miniseries Tales of the Unexpected, along with the Spectre (Crispus Allen). Romy Chandler and Stacy also made brief cameos.
- Harvey Bullock is hired back onto the force under disciplinary probation during the "one-year gap"—the exact reasons are never expressly stated—with the understanding that he is not allowed to make a single mistake. He and Batman have set a "clean slate" for their new working relationship (see Batman: Face the Face).

== Awards ==
- Eisner Awards – Best Serialized Story 2004 – Half a Life (Gotham Central #6–10).
- Harvey Awards – Best Single Issue or Story 2004 – Half a Life (Gotham Central #6–10). Tied with Love & Rockets #9.
- Gaylactic Spectrum Awards – Best Other Work 2004 – Half a Life (Gotham Central #6–10). Tied with Angels in America.

== Collected editions ==
Title	Material collected	ISBN
Gotham Central Vol. 1: In the Line of Duty	Gotham Central #1–5	ISBN 1-4012-0199-7
Gotham Central Vol. 2: Half a Life	Gotham Central #6–10, Batman Chronicles #16, Detective Comics #747	ISBN 1-4012-0438-4
Gotham Central Vol. 3: Unresolved Targets	Gotham Central #12–15, 19–22	ISBN 1-56389-995-7
Gotham Central Vol. 4: The Quick and the Dead	Gotham Central #23–25, 28–31	ISBN 1-4012-0912-2
Gotham Central Vol. 5: Dead Robin	Gotham Central #33–40	ISBN 1-4012-1329-4
Gotham Central Book One: In the Line of Duty	Gotham Central #1–10	ISBN 1-4012-1923-3
Gotham Central Book Two: Jokers and Madmen	Gotham Central #11–22	ISBN 1-4012-2521-7
Gotham Central Book Three: On the Freak Beat	Gotham Central #23–31	ISBN 978-1-4012-2754-8
Gotham Central Book Four: Corrigan	Gotham Central #32–40	ISBN 978-1-4012-3003-6
Gotham Central Omnibus	Gotham Central #1–40	ISBN 978-1-4012-6192-4

== Television series ==
In August 2006, Brubaker said that he was told that many people at Warner Bros. loved the comic, and that if they had not had a moratorium on Batman television shows, they "could have set up Gotham Central at WB in a heartbeat".

A television series titled Gotham was in development by Fox in 2013, following the career of Jim Gordon prior to the appearance of Batman. The series premise bears similarities to Gotham Central. It premiered on September 22, 2014. To coincide with Gotham's premiere, DC Comics issued a reprint of Gotham Central #1, at a special price of $1.

An untitled police procedural TV series from Matt Reeves was in development, to be set in the same continuity as the film The Batman. Gotham Central was being considered as a title for the series. The development of the show was revealed to not being moving forward and put on hold in March 2022.

== See also ==
- Batman: GCPD, a comic book series similar in theme to Gotham Central.
