= Greg Rucka =

American writer (born 1969)

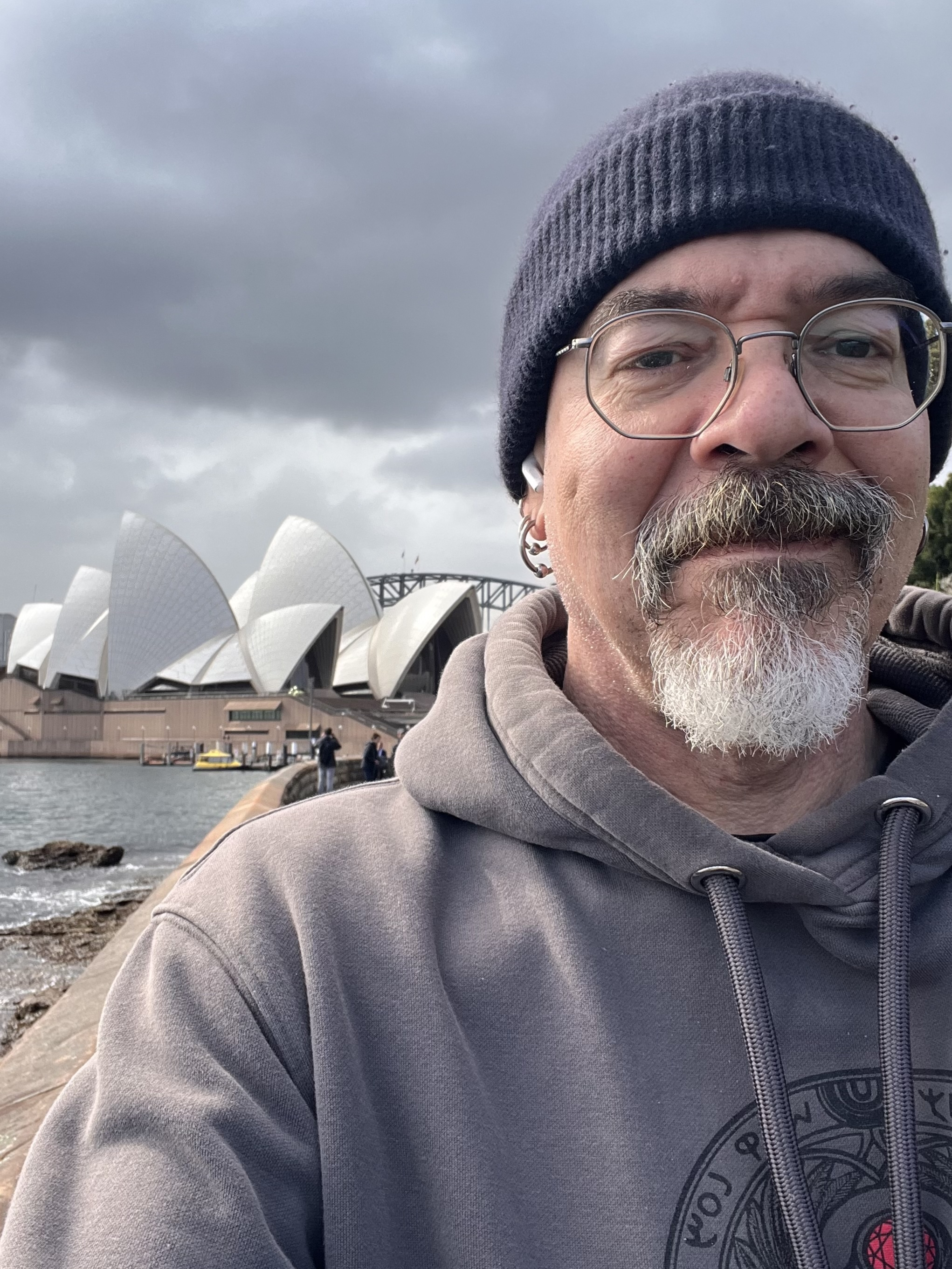
- Rucka in 2025
- Born: Gregory Rucka; November 29, 1969 (age 56) San Francisco, California, U.S.
- Area: Writer
- Notable works: Atticus Kodiak; Whiteout; Batman: No Man's Land; Batman: New Gotham; Queen & Country; Elektra; Wolverine; Wonder Woman; Gotham Central; 52; Stumptown; Batwoman: Elegy; The Punisher; Lazarus
- Awards: Three Eisner Awards; 2004 Harvey Award for Best Single Issue or Story; 2010 Annual GLAAD Media Award for Outstanding Comic Book
- Spouse: Jen Van Meter

Gregory Rucka (born November 29, 1969) is an American writer known for the series of novels starring his character Atticus Kodiak, the creator-owned comic book series Whiteout, Queen & Country, Stumptown and Lazarus, as well as lengthy runs on such titles as Detective Comics, Wonder Woman and Gotham Central for DC Comics, and Elektra, Wolverine and The Punisher for Marvel. He has written a substantial amount of supplemental material for a number of DC Comics' line-wide and inter-title crossovers, including "No Man's Land", "Infinite Crisis" and "New Krypton".

He also co-created the DC character Kate Kane, the second Batwoman.

Rucka made his debut as a screenwriter with the screenplay for the 2020 film The Old Guard, based on his comic book series of the same name.

== Early life ==
Greg Rucka was born to Corrina J. (née Schnitzer) and Noel Michael Rucka, in San Francisco, and raised on the Monterey Peninsula of California, in an area known to the locals as "Steinbeck Country". Rucka is Jewish. He first discovered comics at the Nob Hill Foods supermarket in Salinas, California, where at age five, he first saw digest-sized black and white reprints of Stan Lee and Jack Kirby's work on The Incredible Hulk, which he convinced his mother to buy. He began writing at a young age, and at age 10, he won a county-wide short story contest. He graduated from Vassar College with an A.B. in English. He then enrolled in the University of Southern California's Master of Professional Writing program, graduating with a Master of Fine Arts. He names Douglas Adams as his biggest influence.

Before becoming a professional fiction writer he worked in a number of other occupations, including house painting, restaurant work, emergency medical technician, security guard, technical writer, and fight choreographer.

== Career ==
Rucka's writing career began with the Atticus Kodiak series. Kodiak is a bodyguard whose jobs are rarely as uncomplicated as they at first appear. The series to date consists of Keeper, Finder, Smoker, Shooting at Midnight, Critical Space, Patriot Acts, and Walking Dead. These works garnered Rucka much critical acclaim and comparisons to the elite writers of crime/suspense fiction. The "Atticus" novels are notable for their realism and attention to detail, which is partly a product of Rucka's fight training and experience as an EMT. He has written six non-Atticus books: Fistful of Rain, Alpha, Bravo, A Gentleman's Game, Private Wars, and The Last Run; the latter three are tie-ins to his comic book series Queen & Country.

In 1998, Rucka entered the comics industry with Whiteout, published through Oni Press. Whiteout focuses on a murder in an Antarctic base. It was followed by a sequel, Whiteout: Melt.

The majority of Rucka's work throughout the 2000s was for DC Comics, where he was involved with their main trinity of characters: Superman, Batman and Wonder Woman. Rucka wrote Batman on a regular basis in the Detective Comics series following the events of "No Man's Land'". He wrote the novelization of the year-long arc. While writing Detective Comics, he created a number of background characters that led to the co-creation of Gotham Central with co-writer Ed Brubaker. His Batman work includes such story arcs as "Bruce Wayne: Murderer?" and "Bruce Wayne: Fugitive". as well as the Batman: Death and the Maidens limited series. From October 2003 to April 2006 he wrote Wonder Woman after having previously written the character in the Wonder Woman: The Hiketeia original graphic novel.

From 2002 to 2004, he did some work for Marvel, including the start of the third volume of Wolverine, Elektra and the mini-series Ultimate Daredevil and Elektra. He has worked for Image Comics. The first volume of his series Queen & Country concluded in July 2007 with issue #32.

He co-wrote Countdown to Infinite Crisis, a one-shot and the official start of the Infinite Crisis storyline, with Geoff Johns and Judd Winick. Rucka's work on both Wonder Woman and Gotham Central ended in 2006. Although he was not involved in the main storyline of Infinite Crisis, he did write The OMAC Project which built towards the event, focusing on Batman's distrust of other superheroes. This led to the revival of Checkmate, a UN authority that oversaw superheroes including Sasha Bordeaux, an integral character of The OMAC Project. He was a co-writer on the weekly series 52, which he co-wrote with Geoff Johns, Grant Morrison, and Mark Waid. This series chronicled in real-time the year following Infinite Crisis, and saw Rucka focus on Renee Montoya of Gotham Central and the creation of the new Batwoman, Kate Kane. Rucka returned to the Batwoman character frequently over the years in a 52 sequel The Crime Bible and Final Crisis: Revelations before returning to the character in Detective Comics with artist J. H. Williams III, as well as reviving Renee Montoya in the book's second feature with artist Cully Hamner.

Rucka wrote the screenplay for the "Crossfire" segment in the direct-to-DVD anime Batman: Gotham Knight, in which Crispus Allen, a character he created, appears. In 2009, Rucka and artist Eddy Barrows took over Action Comics as the title moved its focus from Superman to Kryptonian heroes Nightwing and Flamebird in the aftermath of the "New Krypton" story arc. As well as writing Action Comics, Rucka co-wrote the main New Krypton 12 part series with Superman writer James Robinson.

At Wondercon 2010 Rucka announced he would part ways with DC Comics to focus on his own projects, in part because of DC's failure to keep him on as writer of Wonder Woman: Earth One as promised. Rucka then wrote The Punisher for Marvel Comics.

On July 11, 2011, Rucka launched the webcomic Lady Sabre and the Pirates of the Ineffable Aether, a steampunk adventure series illustrated by Rick Burchett. New installments appear every Monday and Thursday. In May 2013, Rucka launched a Kickstarter campaign to fund the publication of a print edition of Lady Sabre, and achieved their initial funding goal of $27,500 within eight hours.

He wrote the creator-owned series, Black Magick, which was drawn by Nicola Scott and published by Image Comics. The Rucka/Scott creative team produced a new Wonder Woman series for DC Comics in June 2016 as part of the DC Rebirth relaunch. Rucka concluded his run on Wonder Woman as of issue #25.

In 2017, Rucka wrote the creator-owned series The Old Guard, which was drawn by Leandro Fernandez, colored by Daniela Miwa and published by Image Comics. In March 2017, Skydance Media picked up the rights to adapt the comic into a film with the same name. Rucka wrote the film's script. The film was released on Netflix in July 2020.

In July 2019, Rucka began writing the Lois Lane 12-issue limited series with artist Mike Perkins. In December 2019, Rucka began writing a second volume of The Old Guard called The Old Guard: Force Multiplied.

In August 2023 Netflix released Heart of Stone, an action-thriller starring Gal Gadot whose story was conceived by Rucka, and whose script was written by Rucka and Allison Schroeder.

== Appearances in media ==
Rucka was featured as a character in the CSI: Crime Scene Investigation comic book mini-series Dying in the Gutters, where he accidentally killed comics gossip columnist Rich Johnston while attempting to kill Joe Quesada over his perceived role in the cancellation of Gotham Central.

Rucka is one of several professional comic artists whose names were used for characters in an episode of the ninth season of the BBC police drama New Tricks.

== Personal life ==
Rucka, his wife, author Jen Van Meter, and their two children, lived in Eugene, Oregon, and as of 2013 live in Portland, Oregon.

Rucka names The Conversation, Butch Cassidy and the Sundance Kid and The Silence of the Lambs as his favorite films. He enjoys the music of Dexter Gordon, Lester Bowie, Joe Jackson, Warren Zevon, and Melissa Ferrick. His other hobbies include role-playing games, computer games, playing the guitar and collecting action figures.

== Awards ==
=== Wins ===
- 2000 Eisner Award for Best Limited Series (for Whiteout: Melt)
- 2002 Eisner Award for Best New Series (for Queen & Country, with Steve Rolston)
- 2004 Eisner Award for Best Serialized Story (for Gotham Central #6-10: "Half a Life", with Michael Lark)
- 2004 Harvey Award for Best Single Issue or Story (for Gotham Central #6-10, with Michael Lark; tied with Gilbert Hernandez and Jaime Hernandez for Love and Rockets #9)
- 2010 GLAAD Media Award for Outstanding Comic Book (for Detective Comics)
- 2011 Eisner Award for Best Short Story (for "Post Mortem" from I Am An Avenger #2, with Michael Lark).

=== Nominations ===
- 1999 Eisner Award
  - Best Limited Series (for Whiteout, with Steve Lieber)
  - Best Writer (for Whiteout)
- 2000 Eisner Award
  - Best Graphic Album: Reprint (for Whiteout, with Steve Lieber)
  - Best Writer (for Whiteout: Melt)
- 2002 Eisner Award
  - Best Continuing Series (for Queen & Country, with Steve Rolston)
  - Best Serialized Story (for Queen & Country #1-4: "Operation: Broken Ground", with Steve Rolston)
  - Best Writer (for Queen & Country)
- 2003 Eisner Award
  - Best New Series (for Gotham Central, with Ed Brubaker and Michael Lark)
  - Best Serialized Story (for Queen & Country #8-12: "Operation: Crystal Ball", with Leandro Fernández)
  - Best Writer (for Queen & Country and Wonder Woman: The Hiketeia)
  - Best Writer (for Queen & Country)
- 2003 Harvey Award for Best Writer (for Gotham Central, with Ed Brubaker)
- 2004 Eisner Award
  - Best Continuing Series (for Gotham Central, with Ed Brubaker, Michael Lark, Brian Hurtt, and Stefano Gaudiano)
  - Best Continuing Series (for Queen & Country, with Jason Alexander, Carla Speed McNeil, and Mike Hawthorne)
  - Best Serialized Story (for Queen & Country #13-15: "Operation Blackwall", with Jason Shawn Alexander)
  - Best Writer (for Queen & Country, Wonder Woman and Wolverine)
- 2005 Eisner Award for Best Writer (for Queen & Country and Gotham Central)
- 2007 Harvey Award for Best New Series (for 52, with Geoff Johns, Grant Morrison, Mark Waid, and Keith Giffen)
- 2011 Eisner Award for Best Limited Series (for Stumptown, with Matthew Southworth)
- 2014 Eisner Award for Best New Series (for Lazarus, with Michael Lark)

== Screenwriting credits ==
=== Feature film ===
- The Old Guard (2020)
- Heart of Stone (2023)
- The Old Guard 2 (2025)

=== Television ===
- Batman: Caped Crusader
  - ...And Be a Villain
  - Dead Before Dawn

=== Video games ===
- AR-K: The Great Escape (writer)
- Syphon Filter: Logan's Shadow (story designer)

Preceded by Chuck Dixon	Detective Comics writer 1999–2002	Succeeded by Ed Brubaker
Preceded by Brian Michael Bendis	Elektra writer 2002–2003	Succeeded by Robert Rodi
Preceded by Daniel Way	Wolverine writer 2003–2004	Succeeded by Mark Millar
Preceded by Walt Simonson	Wonder Woman writer 2003–2006	Succeeded by Allan Heinberg
Preceded by Joe Casey	Adventures of Superman writer 2004–2006	Succeeded by n/a
Preceded by Paul Kupperberg	Checkmate writer 2006–2008	Succeeded by Bruce Jones
Preceded by Geoff Johns	Action Comics writer 2009–2010	Succeeded by Paul Cornell
Preceded by Paul Dini	Detective Comics writer 2009–2010	Succeeded by David Hine
Preceded by Rick Remender	The Punisher writer 2011–2012	Succeeded by Nathan Edmondson
Preceded by Garth Ennis	Punisher: War Zone writer 2012–2013	Succeeded by n/a
Preceded by Meredith Finch	Wonder Woman writer 2016–2017	Succeeded by Shea Fontana
