= Michael Lark =

American comics artist and colorist

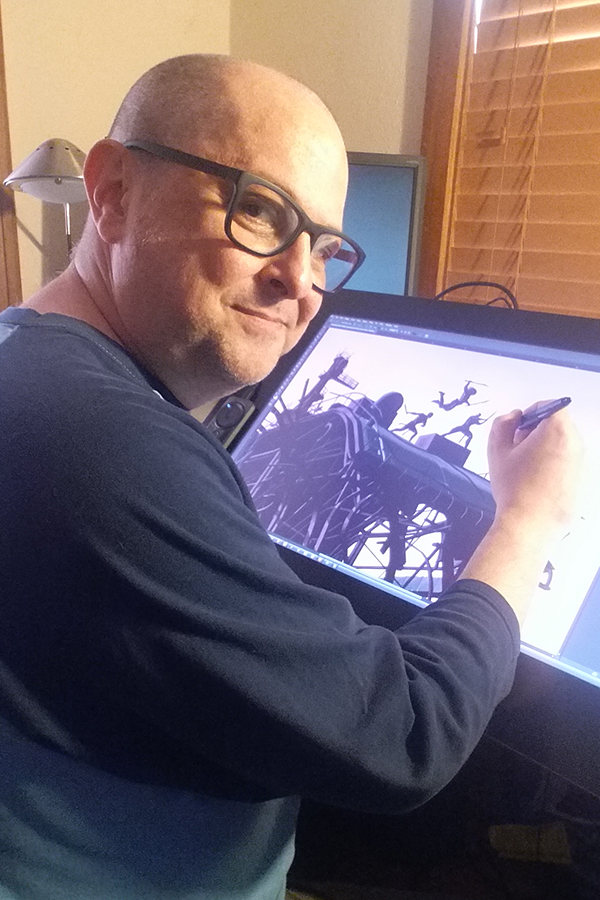
- Lark in 2018
- Born: Michael Lark; 1966 (age 59–60)
- Area: Penciller

Michael Lark (born 1966) is an American Harvey and Eisner Award-winning comic book artist and colorist.

Lark has provided pencils for DC Comics' Batman, Terminal City, Gotham Central, Batman: Nine lives and Legend of the Hawkman. His work for Marvel Comics includes The Pulse, Spider-Man, Daredevil and Captain America. He is currently illustrating Lazarus written by Greg Rucka, contributing to every issue.
