= Stumptown (disambiguation) =

Stumptown is a name or nickname that has been applied to several places in the United States.

Stumptown may also refer to:

- Stumptown (comics), an American comic book series by Greg Rucka and Matthew Southworth
- Stumptown (TV series), an American television series based on the comic book series
- Stumptown Coffee Roasters, an American coffee roaster and retailer based in Portland, Oregon
- "Stumptown", a song on Nickel Creek's album Why Should the Fire Die?
