= Stumptown (TV series) =

2019 American crime drama television series

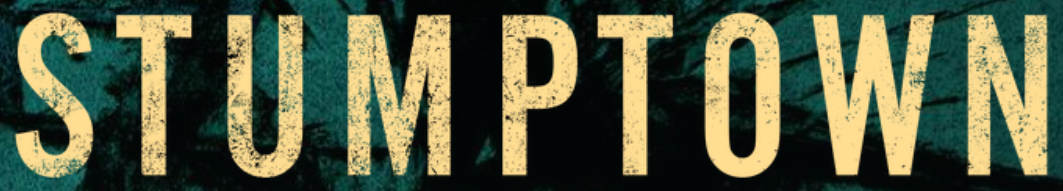
- Genre: Crime drama
- Created by: Jason Richman
- Based on: Stumptown by: Greg Rucka; Matthew Southworth; Justin Greenwood
- Starring: Cobie Smulders; Jake Johnson; Tantoo Cardinal; Cole Sibus; Adrian Martinez; Camryn Manheim; Michael Ealy
- Music by: Tyler Bates
- Country of origin: United States
- Original language: English
- No. of seasons: 1
- No. of episodes: 18

Production
- Executive producers: Greg Rucka; Matthew Southworth; Justin Greenwood; Kristin Newman; Marc Buckland; Ruben Fleischer; David Bernad; David Zabel; James Griffiths; Jason Richman
- Producers: Vail Romeyn; Cobie Smulders; David A. Rosemont; Louisa Levy
- Cinematography: G. Magni Ágústsson; Clark Mathis
- Editors: Andrew Groves; Sondra Watanabe; Lance Luckey; Nicole Vaskell; Katharine Neville
- Camera setup: Single-camera
- Running time: 42–43 minutes
- Production companies: Don't Tell Mom; The District; ABC Studios

Original release
- Network: ABC
- Release: September 25, 2019 – March 25, 2020

Stumptown is an American crime drama television series that premiered on ABC on September 25, 2019. The series is based on the comic book series of the same name, created by Greg Rucka, Matthew Southworth and Justin Greenwood and adapted for television by writer-producer Jason Richman. The title Stumptown is a nickname for the city of Portland, Oregon, where the series is set. In October 2019, ABC issued a full season order.

In May 2020, the series was renewed for a second season. In September 2020, ABC reversed the renewal decision and canceled the series after one season, as production delays caused by the COVID-19 pandemic meant the series would not have been ready until April 2021.

== Premise ==
Dexadrine "Dex" Parios is a sharp-witted military veteran, who struggles to get by and take care of her younger brother Ansel, in Portland, Oregon. She also struggles with PTSD from her time as a Marine in Afghanistan, where she worked in military intelligence until she was injured by an explosion which killed her college sweetheart and former lover. Burdened by heavy gambling debts and unable to hold down a steady job, she becomes a private investigator to solve problems where the police aren't getting involved. Detective Miles Hoffman refers problems to her, and Grey McConnell, a bar owner and Dex's closest friend, provides moral support and employs her brother Ansel at his bar.

== Cast and characters ==
=== Main ===
- Cobie Smulders as Dex Parios, a Marine veteran who now works as a private investigator to support her brother and dig her way out of debt
- Jake Johnson as Grey McConnell, an ex-con, owner of the Bad Alibi bar, and Dex's closest friend
- Tantoo Cardinal as Sue Lynn Blackbird, Native from the Confederated Tribes who is the owner of a tribal casino and mother of Dex's deceased boyfriend
- Cole Sibus as Ansel Parios, Dex's brother who has Down syndrome and works as a bar-back at the Bad Alibi
- Adrian Martinez as Tookie, a food truck owner who serves as an informant for Dex
- Camryn Manheim as Lieutenant Cosgrove, Detective Hoffman's supervisor
- Michael Ealy as Detective Miles Hoffman, Dex's contact at the Portland Police Bureau

=== Recurring ===
- Gregory Zaragoza as Hollis Green, Sue Lynn Blackbird's right-hand man
- Monica Barbaro as Liz Melero, a bartender at the Bad Alibi who also dated Grey
- Fiona Rene as Detective Kara Lee, Hoffman's partner
- Selwyn Huqueriza as Victor, Tookie's assistant chef
- Chuck Filipov as Scuzzy, the point man for an auto theft ring
- Tommy O'Brien as Charles "Chaz" Wyatt, a car thief who works with Scuzzy

=== Guest ===
- Inbar Lavi as Max, a mechanic and member of the auto theft ring who wants to get out of it. She forms a romantic relationship with Grey.
- Robert Adamson as Jeremy Stevens, a vet who befriends Dex after she helps him find his birth family.
- Cynthia Addai-Robinson as "Violet", an assassin sent to reclaim the drugs stolen by Leo's crew
- Troian Bellisario as Jenna Marshall, a prospective bride whose fiancé Dex is hired to investigate
- Steven Williams as Lionel Hoffman, Miles' father, a prominent local defense attorney, whom Miles is estranged from
- Denise Dowse as Mrs. Hoffman, Miles' mother
- Matt Craven as Michael McConnell, Grey's father who abandoned him many years before
- Román Zaragoza as Hollis Green's nephew
- Julie Goldman as Poppy Williams

=== Technical Advisor ===
- Becky Altringer is a private investigator with Ariel Investigations She is listed in the List of female detective characters. She is a private investigator in California and New Mexico who exposed the Motion Picture Association of America in This Film Is Not Yet Rated, and technical consultant for Stumptown.

== Production ==
=== Development ===
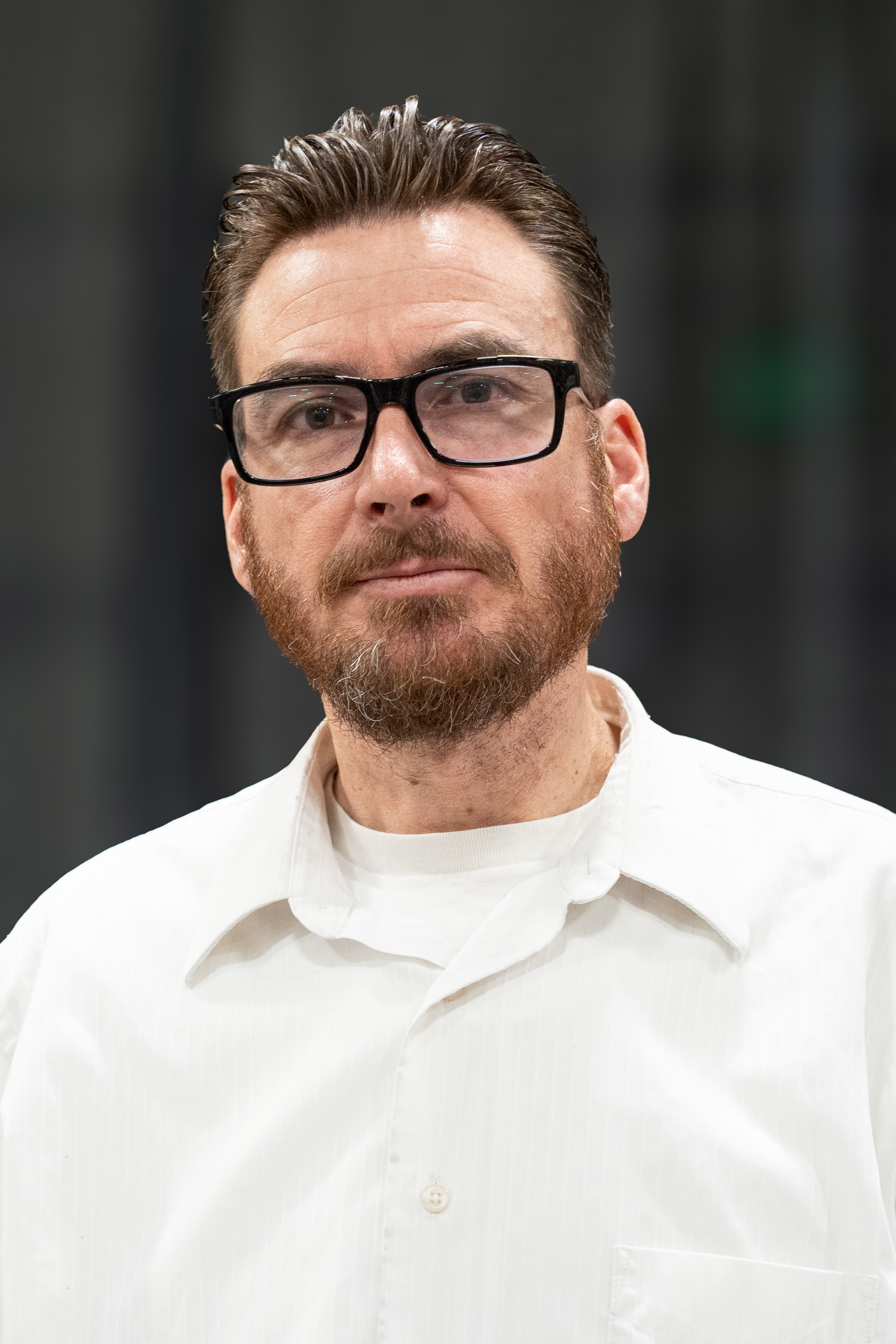
Justin Greenwood at ComicCon Oakland 2026

On January 29, 2019, it was announced that ABC had given the production a pilot order. The pilot was written by Jason Richman who executive produces along with Ruben Fleischer, Dave Bernad, Greg Rucka, Matthew Southworth and Justin Greenwood. Production companies involved with the pilot include The District and ABC Studios. On May 8, 2019, it was announced that the production had been given a series order. A day after that, it was announced that the series would premiere in the fall of 2019 and air on Wednesdays at 10:00 P.M. The series premiered on September 25, 2019. On October 28, 2019, the series received a full season order.

=== Casting ===
In February 2019, it was announced that Cobie Smulders had been cast in the pilot's lead role. Alongside the series order announcement, it was reported that Michael Ealy, Mark Webber and Camryn Manheim had joined the cast in starring roles. On May 11, 2019, it was reported that Webber, who was originally cast to play the male lead opposite Smulders in the series, had exited and his role would be recast. On May 29, 2019, Jake Johnson was cast as Grey McConnell, replacing Webber.

At the 2019 San Diego Comic Con preview of the pilot, Cobie Smulders confirmed that Dex's bisexuality would "definitely be addressed in the series". Smulders described Dex as "definitely attracted to women and men ... she tries to recover from her PTSD through sex. She's up for anything — it's one of the things that drew me to this character."

=== Filming ===
Although set in Portland, the series is filmed in Los Angeles. However, the pilot episode, filmed mostly in Vancouver, B.C., included a few scenes shot in Portland.

=== Cancellation ===
On May 21, 2020, ABC renewed the series for a second season. On July 25, 2020, Monica Owusu-Breen joined the series as an executive producer for the second season. On September 16, 2020, it was announced that production delays, caused by the ongoing COVID-19 pandemic, meant the series would not be ready in time, effectively canceling the series. ABC Studios unsuccessfully shopped the series for a new broadcast partner. According to Deadline Hollywood, production had not yet started, the change of showrunner would also have delayed scripts and the show would not have been ready until April 2021.

== Episodes ==
| No. | Title | Directed by | Written by | Original release date | U.S. viewers (millions) |
|---|---|---|---|---|---|
| 1 | "Forget It Dex, It's Stumptown." | James Griffiths | Jason Richman | September 25, 2019 | 4.61 |
Dex Parios is a former Marine officer whose PTSD makes it impossible to stay employed, leaving her financially insecure. After gambling away her latest disability check at the local casino, the owner, Sue Lynn, asks Dex to find her runaway granddaughter Nina in return for clearing her debt. Dex accepts the job, but her lack of experience quickly shows, as she finds Nina only to then lose her to two kidnappers and steals a car from a gangster whom she wrongly assumes had something to do with the kidnapping. She meets a police detective, Miles Hoffman, who encourages her to stay away from the case. Shortly thereafter, Sue Lynn fires Dex, claiming Nina has been returned home. Depressed, she goes to Hoffman's apartment and sleeps with him. The next day, while Dex is trying to track down Nina's boyfriend Michael, the kidnappers grab her and drive off; she subdues them and proceeds to rescue Sue Lynn and Nina from an unstable Michael. Impressed, Hoffman offers to keep Dex on retainer if he comes across any other problems the police cannot handle.
| 2 | "Missed Connections" | James Griffiths | Matt Olmstead & Mike Weiss & Jason Richman | October 2, 2019 | 3.99 |
Flashbacks show Dex and Grey meeting for the first time six years ago and befriending each other. Grey connects Dex with a new client, Allen, a widower who offers to pay Dex $1,000 if she finds Katrina, a girl he met at a bar. Dex locates Katrina and completes the job, but the check Allen gives her turns out to be worthless. While searching his home, someone knocks her out from behind. Hoffman subsequently informs Dex that "Katrina" is actually a professional con artist, who has robbed dozens of men like Allen for several years. Determined to get her money, Dex tracks Allen to a motel room, where she stops Katrina's psychotic partner Megan from asphyxiating him after discovering their relationship. Allen pays Dex her fee and leaves to start a new life with Katrina. One of Grey's former criminal partners, Jack, comes by to beg for money to pay a debt; Grey refuses to help and Jack is found murdered shortly thereafter under a bridge. Based on advice from Hoffman's superior, Cosgrove, Dex decides to apply for a license so she can legally work as a PI.
| 3 | "Rip City Dicks" | Dean White | Zahir McGee | October 9, 2019 | 3.43 |
Dex persuades veteran PI Artie Banks (Donal Logue) to take her on as his apprentice. Their first job involves a messy divorce between real estate tycoon Randall Tapper and his wife Candace. Banks offers a great deal of useful advice, and admits he sympathizes with Dex because she reminds him of his daughter. Hoffman starts investigating Grey while looking into Jack's murder. Prompted by Banks, Dex goes to Hoffman's apartment for dinner; the two try to work each other for information on their respective cases before giving in to their feelings and having sex. The investigation scores a major breakthrough when Tapper's current girlfriend gives Banks video evidence of him abusing her, but Dex later discovers that he sold it to Tapper, had no intention of helping Candace, and has been manipulating her from the start. Banks condescendingly tells Dex that she would be a great PI if she only learned not to care. Hoffman tells Grey he knows about his connection to Jack, and offers him protection if he agrees to help find his killer. An enraged Dex visits Candace and declares her intention to bring down both Tapper and Banks.
| 4 | "Family Ties" | Marc Buckland | Deirdre Shaw | October 16, 2019 | 2.83 |
Grey's old boss, Wallace Kane, escapes from custody while serving a life sentence. Dex's attempts to dig up dirt on Tapper are continually thwarted by Banks, while Sue Lynn, who has partnered with Tapper to build a school, pressures Dex by threatening to call in her debt to the casino. Banks eventually succumbs to his guilt after Dex calls him a scumbag and admits that Candace's daughter reminds him of his own deceased child; he leads her to Tapper's former accountant who reveals that the school is a cover for illegal activity. Cosgrove notices that Hoffman is becoming obsessed with the Kane case, and assigns it to another detective. Dex and Banks search the construction site, and find evidence that Tapper is smuggling counterfeit pills. With help from Sue Lynn, who abhors drug dealing on her reservation, Dex gets Tapper to incriminate himself on camera, and forces him to remove the pills, finish the school, and return Candace's daughter to her. Banks signs off on Dex's hours, qualifying her to get a PI license. Kane abducts Grey and informs him that he will have to pull off one last job to pay his and Jack's debt.
| 5 | "Bad Alibis" | Brooke Kennedy | Manuel Figueroa & Jordan Heimer | October 30, 2019 | 2.67 |
Dex is interviewed for her license. With Grey missing, she takes over management of the Bad Alibi and hires Tookie when the bar's chef unexpectedly quits. Hoffman defies orders to stay away from Grey's case, and is threatened with the loss of his badge if he does not walk away. Instead, he hires Dex to find him instead. While on the job, Grey discovers that Kane plans to kill his friend Denton and has assigned his enforcer Frank to take Ansel hostage in order to keep him in line. While at a restaurant with Frank, Ansel gets in contact with his sister; she rescues him and interrogates Frank to learn where Kane and Grey are. The police stage a raid, and Hoffman catches up to Kane, nearly killing him in anger before Cosgrove talks him down. Dex punches Grey for putting her brother in danger and tells him that he'd better come clean while he still can. Despite having found an engagement ring while searching his loft, she is unable to get him to admit that he might have feelings for her. Tookie decides to quit so he can return to his food truck. Dex receives news that she passed her interview and her license has been approved.
| 6 | "Dex, Drugs and Rock & Roll" | Marc Buckland | William Jehu Garroutte & Jason Richman | November 6, 2019 | 2.82 |
Fiona X, a punk rocker who is also Dex's ex-girlfriend, hires her to track down a stalker while also making it clear that she is still attracted to Dex. Hoffman is unsure of his relationship with Dex and Kara tells him he should tell her how he feels. After a scare at a concert, Fiona reminisces about their past romance and they sleep together. Grey meets Liz, a guide for a local "paranormal tourism" outfit, and they hit it off to the disapproval of Ansel, who fears that Grey will abandon him now that he does not "love" his sister. After Ansel locks himself in Grey's office, Dex and Grey explain that, no matter what, they will never let anything drive apart their friendship. Tookie's truck is shut down for minor health permit violations, and he asks Cosgrove for help; they bond over their shared love of Mexican cuisine and begin a platonic friendship. The police locate the stalker; the man claims Fiona sent him dozens of letters which turn out to have been written by her controlling manager Nick, whom Hoffman arrests. Fiona asks Dex to join her, but Dex turns her down, stating she is not the person she was ten years ago. Hoffman takes Dex on a bowling date.
| 7 | "November Surprise" | David Rodriguez | Mike Weiss | November 20, 2019 | 2.62 |
Vanessa, the manager for a wealthy state senate candidate, hires Dex to dig up compromising material on his opponent, Councilman Dan Gibson. Dex poses as one of Gibson's volunteers and breaks into his office late at night, where she steals a letter and fends off a rival PI, Carol, also hired by Vanessa. Carol subsequently warns Hoffman that he needs to keep a closer eye on Dex. Grey agrees to let Liz train to be his new bartender, but their growing relationship annoys Dex; Liz tells Grey that he needs to prove he loves her and not Dex or they will eventually break up. Dex continues her investigation, ultimately discovering that Gibson, a gay man, fathered a son out of wedlock with a student while he was teaching college. Despite her efforts to hide this revelation, Vanessa learns about it and pays her for her services. Realizing that she cannot live with profiting off the destruction of two families, Dex brokers a compromise: Gibson will drop out of the race if his son's privacy is respected. She also returns Vanessa's money and cuts all ties with her. Liz, Grey, and Hoffman join Dex and Ansel for "Friendsgiving".
| 8 | "The Other Woman" | Jessica Yu | Heidi Cole McAdams | December 4, 2019 | 2.92 |
Sue Lynn hires Dex again, this time to identify whoever is behind a series of attacks aimed at her. The case requires Dex to visit the reservation, where she is driven off by Sue Lynn's bitter daughter-in-law Naomi. Hoffman persuades her not to drop the case, and she strikes a deal with Sue Lynn to get full access to the reservation; Sue Lynn assigns Naomi to shadow her investigation. Based on Dex's intuition that someone within the tribe has a grievance against Sue Lynn, the pair discover that Hollis' nephew is plotting against her, and use it to force Hollis to turn over the names of reservation members expelled by Sue Lynn. Hoffman finds that one of them was a young man kicked out for selling drugs, and arrests him after finding him with a pipe bomb. However, before he can be processed, Sue Lynn exercises her authority as tribal chief to take him into her custody. Hoffman tells Dex that she crossed a line when she included Liz in the names to be investigated. Dex was paid by Sue Lynn with casino chips and she invites Liz to join her for a celebration at the craps table. The next morning, she wakes up to find a naked Liz in bed next to her.
| 9 | "Dex Education" | Lily Mariye | Nicholas Wootton | December 11, 2019 | 3.12 |
Dex and Liz agree that since they do not remember having sex, they will not tell anyone about their girls night out. Dex's high school nemesis, Penny, hires her when her daughter Jennifer is expelled for selling Adderall, which she swears was planted. Dex goes undercover as a substitute teacher, wiretaps a member of the school's volleyball team, and discovers that the coach was the drug dealer. Grey found out from Ansel that Liz had spent the night with Dex. When Dex cannot be straightforward about what happened, Grey tells her that she is not welcome in his bar any longer. Hoffman is hurt as well, but buries his feelings and tells Dex their relationship should be kept professional. The coach is arrested after she is seen buying more pills and tried to flee. Jennifer is cleared, and Penny makes amends with Dex. With video footage provided by Sue Lynn, Grey discovers that Liz intentionally got Dex drunk to destroy their friendship, and he kicks her out. Sue Lynn told Dex that it was time for her to get her life in order. Ansel tells Dex he wants to move out and live an independent life. Grey goes to see Dex, only to see that Hoffman got there first.
| 10 | "Reality Checks Don't Bounce" | Alex Zakrzewski | Derek Jennings & Zahir McGee | January 8, 2020 | 2.72 |
Celebrity judge Antonio Price pays Dex to deliver a summons to his older brother Lataurus for selling the house he bought him behind his back. Dex discovers that Lataurus used the money to purchase rare civet cats for pet shop owner Dwaddle Chen, but since the cats were seized by customs officers, he is terrified that Chen will kill him. Hoffman is assigned to escort a police captain's wife to a concert; on the way home, her car is stolen and Hoffman uses his leverage on Grey to force him to help find it. Lataurus is abducted, and the judge refuses to pay the ransom, saying that his deadbeat brother is not worth it. This causes Dex to reevaluate her hostile reaction to Ansel's wanting to leave the house, as she realizes that he is tired of being treated as a child and wants the chance to live like a normal adult. Dex stages a rescue to free Lataurus from Chen, but the judge is shot and decides to give his brother the money to get his cats back after he declines an offer to move in with him. Ansel moves out with his sister's blessing. Hoffman tells Grey that he'll be going undercover as an informant in exchange for his record being cleared.
| 11 | "The Past and the Furious" | Stacey K. Black | Louisa Levy | January 15, 2020 | 2.49 |
While trying to find a new balance now that Ansel has left, Dex is approached by Jeremy Stevens, a veteran who recently learned he was adopted and wants to find his real parents. Based on her client's discovery that he is 48% percent Native American, Dex looks into the adoption agency that handled his case but learns that all their records were sealed when the agency closed. Grey meets the carjacking ring Hoffman assigned him to, including a young mechanic named Max who he begins to develop feelings for. Ansel starts working on a list of things to do to prove that he is a "real man", but Grey tells him that his maturity already makes him that. Dex finds Jeremy's dad, but he leaves after telling Dex he could never be a father. She then discovers that the agency falsified the report used to convince the state to have Jeremy taken from his mother, who has since died from drug problems. With Sue Lynn's help, Jeremy is reunited with his aunt and her family. Dex decides to start attending a veterans' group that he recommended to her. Grey's new boss asks him to help dispose of a heroin shipment the gang stole by mistake.
| 12 | "Dirty Dexy Money" | Marc Buckland | Ariel Hall & Woody Strassner | January 22, 2020 | 2.36 |
Dex takes a job from Ginger Lloyd (Cheryl Hines), owner of a vegan restaurant/strip club, to investigate a claim that one of the dancers is skimming from the club. As Grey continues to burrow his way into the gang, Hoffman clashes with Jimmy, a vice detective and friend of Cosgrove's who insists on being involved with the case. Ginger showers Dex with attention and gifts (something strictly prohibited by PI regulations) and attempts to get her to sleep with a dancer. Everything comes to a head when the dancers reveal that they have all been skimming to help a colleague who blames Ginger for his injuries; Ginger refuses to hear Dex out, fires her, and files a complaint accusing her of accepting bribes and demonstrating incompetence, putting her license at risk. Dex goes to her first group meeting, which inspires her to retaliate by filing her own complaints with the city. Impressed by her boldness, Ginger drops the complaint and agrees to address the dancers' concerns. Hoffman sets a trap for Jimmy, correctly guessing that he is corrupt. He and Grey realize that they need Dex to help them with Grey's plan to buy the rest of the heroin.
| 13 | "The Dex Factor" | Stacey K. Black | Matt Olmstead & Jason Richman | February 5, 2020 | 2.28 |
Dex agrees to pose as Grey's drug buyer from Los Angeles; she meets Violet, a US Army former CID Special Agent, at the support group. However, Violet is secretly a fixer sent to retrieve the stolen heroin. She flirts with Dex and they connect over their experience with trauma and adjusting to post-military life. After making love, they trade phone numbers the next morning. Grey leaves the Bad Alibi in Ansel's care and Tookie swings by to help. After the sting operation goes down, Dex finds Violet outside the body shop, holding a gun. Surprised to see her there, Violet tells Dex she does not want to hurt her, but Dex says her best friend is inside, and a fight ensues. Violet is wounded and thrown over the balcony, but when Dex looks down she is gone. With help from Sue Lynn, Grey gets Max out of town and gives her his truck to escape. Ansel gets permission from Dex to take driving lessons. Later, at the Bad Alibi, the bartender brings Dex a cocktail sent by a woman, that is similar to what Violet was drinking when they met. Dex looks around, but Violet has slipped away.
| 14 | "Til Dex Do Us Part" | Ruben Fleischer | William Jehu Garroutte & Heidi Cole McAdams | February 12, 2020 | 2.38 |
Claire Chesterfield hires Dex to do a background check on Zack Knight, a tattoo artist and her sister Jenna's fiancee. Dex visits his parlor and grills him, learning that while Zack himself is clean, he does have a secret: he blames himself for the accident that killed Dahlia, the girl he was supposed to marry before he met Jenna. Tookie forces Grey to take him on as a "partner" in the Bad Alibi; Grey, resistant to change and furious that Tookie seems to think he cannot run his own bar properly, throws him out. Ansel is upset and tells Grey that without Tookie's food, the Bad Alibi will suffer financially. Hoffman sets up an article attacking his father, Lionel, for representing a man he arrested; his mother forces them to make amends and Lionel extends an offer to Hoffman to join his firm. Grey invites Tookie to return to the Bad Alibi and promotes Ansel to assistant manager. Dex crashes Jenna's wedding and forces her to confess that she was the driver who killed Dahlia; the police arrest her and Zack repays Dex for her help by giving her a free tattoo of a blackbird on her abdomen.
| 15 | "At All Costs: The Conrad Costas Chronicles" | Christopher Misiano | Nicholas Wootton | February 19, 2020 | 2.23 |
Dex takes Grey with her on a trip to L.A., where she intends to help a struggling screenwriter, Camille Costas, expose an old colleague who stole her latest work, based on her uncle's police career, and is turning it into a movie. Grey also discovers that Dex has a secondary motive: a letter from Maribel, her aunt who may know the whereabouts of her missing parents. Tookie, despite having been told specifically not to, rents out the Bad Alibi for Hoffman's mother's birthday party. Ansel discovers Grey's antique pistol is missing from his office (it later turns out Grey put it storage for safekeeping). Dex gets a copy of the script and proves it was plagiarized, but her rented apartment is burned down before she can finalize a deal. She has Grey spread rumors that she has video evidence, allowing her to set up a sting and catch the washed-up actor hired to try and kill her. The producers give in and agree to all of Camille's demands. Grey meets his long lost father, who has started a new family, and finds the closure he has long sought. Dex goes to see Maribel, who reveals that her parents may have abandoned her and Ansel to protect them.
| 16 | "All Quiet On the Dextern Front" | Marc Buckland | Woody Strassner & Louisa Levy | March 4, 2020 | 2.32 |
Jeremy, the veteran whose adoption Dex investigated, brings a relative Aimee to the bar. After an anonymous tip off that Aimee robbed a john, Social Services are threatening to take her children. This trigger flashbacks in Dex about a mother with Taliban connection she interrogated in Afghanistan, whose children had been taken to keep her quiet. Dex refused to torture her and soldiers died including Benny, which Dex finally confesses to Sue Lynn. Hoffman finds DNA from the real robber at the crime scene and Dex guilts her into confessing, so Aimee's charges are dropped. Meanwhile, Grey and Tookie help Ansel summon up the courage to ask out Lila from the frozen yogurt place.
| 17 | "The Dex Files" | Alex Zakrzewski | Ariel Hall & Nicholas Wootton | March 18, 2020 | 2.68 |
Hoffman and Lee are undercover at a swingers club looking for a woman who is spiking drinks to rob people, where they spot Tookie's wife which blows up his marriage, and results in Lee and Hoffman having sex. Jeremy's friend in MI tells Dex that Benny was not killed by the Taliban as she was told, so she was not to blame. Dex keeps remembering Benny and cannot let it go. Hoffman tips off Dex that a DOD IT worker was rounded up in the bust and Dex blackmails him into getting her a file, which reveals Benny informed on members of his squad who were stealing millions in aid money in Afghanistan. Dex breaks into the house of TJ, a squad member who bought a mansion after his tours, and finds him dead. Someone knocks her out with chloroform.
| 18 | "All Hands on Dex" | Marc Buckland | Derek Jennings & Jason Richman | March 25, 2020 | 2.68 |
Dex is arrested for TJ's murder. Cosgrove benches Hoffman and tells him to stay out of the case. To represent Dex, Hoffman hires his father, who gets her released. Dex is told to stay home and do nothing, but instead visits Sue Lynn and gets Benny's old photos and letters. She ditches Grey and visits Wolfe, who confesses that he failed to protect Benny. Dex snaps a photo of Murphy, finds him taking confessions at the VA, grabs his go bag and runs. Dex grabs the bag scattering money everywhere, but Murphy gets away. Cosgrove arrives at the alibi, but Dex escapes and goes to see Hoffman, who suggests talking to her lawyer, then hands the money over to Cosgrove. Murphy turns up dead in the river. Sue Lynn gives Dex a revolver and she visits Wolfe, figuring that Murphy will come for him. Grey turns up at Wolfe's and announces that Murphy was killed. Wolfe opens fire on them wounding Grey. Dex chases Wolfe. They fight and Dex shoots him. Hoffman is suspended. Dex and Sue Lynn visit Benny's grave. Grey's father, who was visiting, disappears and a man turns up at the hospital demanding that Grey help find him. Mrs Parios turns up at Dex's.

== Release ==
=== Marketing ===
On May 14, 2019, ABC released the first official trailer for the series.

== Reception ==
=== Critical response ===
The review aggregation website Rotten Tomatoes reported a 93% approval rating with an average rating of 7.56/10, based on 41 reviews. The website's critical consensus reads, "Simple, but strong, Stumptown moves at a brisk pace and packs a serious punch thanks in large part to Cobie Smulders' star making performance." On Metacritic, the series has a weighted average score of 73 out of 100 based on reviews from 16 critics, indicating "generally favorable reviews".

Caroline Framke of Variety wrote: "With only one episode to go on, it's hard to say how 'Stumptown' will handle its upcoming cases of the week, or if it will shade Dex out beyond her clichéd basics. But there are a couple standout elements of the show that point towards a more promising season than not." Allison Shoemaker of The A.V. Club reviewed the first episode and wrote: "It's likely that this origin story will lead to Dex getting a new case/distraction of the week; hopefully, those stories will stand on their own as much as they illuminate her inner life. Even if it doesn't, even if life for Stumptown becomes a lot less interesting after this first trip, Cobie Smulders, and Dex Parios, are well worth visiting again." Mike Hale of The New York Times wrote: "There's a potentially appealing mix of wisecracking humor and underplayed, credible action, though, that could blossom if it's given precedence over the melodramatic back story."

=== Ratings ===
Viewership and ratings per episode of Stumptown
| No. | Title | Air date | Rating/share (18–49) | Viewers (millions) | DVR (18–49) | DVR viewers (millions) | Total (18–49) | Total viewers (millions) |
|---|---|---|---|---|---|---|---|---|
| 1 | "Forget It Dex, It's Stumptown." | September 25, 2019 | 0.7/4 | 4.61 | 1.0 | 4.50 | 1.7 | 9.12 |
| 2 | "Missed Connections" | October 2, 2019 | 0.7/4 | 3.99 | 0.9 | 3.91 | 1.5 | 7.90 |
| 3 | "Rip City Dicks" | October 9, 2019 | 0.6/3 | 3.43 | 0.8 | 3.50 | 1.4 | 6.93 |
| 4 | "Family Ties" | October 16, 2019 | 0.6/3 | 2.83 | 0.7 | 3.37 | 1.3 | 6.21 |
| 5 | "Bad Alibis" | October 30, 2019 | 0.5/3 | 2.67 | 0.7 | 3.27 | 1.2 | 5.94 |
| 6 | "Dex, Drugs and Rock & Roll" | November 6, 2019 | 0.5/3 | 2.82 | 0.6 | 3.17 | 1.1 | 6.00 |
| 7 | "November Surprise" | November 20, 2019 | 0.5/3 | 2.62 | 0.6 | 3.09 | 1.1 | 5.71 |
| 8 | "The Other Woman" | December 4, 2019 | 0.5/3 | 2.92 | 0.5 | 2.89 | 1.0 | 5.81 |
| 9 | "Dex Education" | December 11, 2019 | 0.5/3 | 3.12 | 0.5 | 2.86 | 1.0 | 5.98 |
| 10 | "Reality Checks Don't Bounce" | January 8, 2020 | 0.5/3 | 2.72 | 0.6 | 3.18 | 1.1 | 5.92 |
| 11 | "The Past and the Furious" | January 15, 2020 | 0.4/2 | 2.49 | 0.6 | 3.06 | 0.9 | 5.55 |
| 12 | "Dirty Dexy Money" | January 22, 2020 | 0.4/3 | 2.36 | 0.5 | 2.95 | 0.9 | 5.31 |
| 13 | "The Dex Factor" | February 5, 2020 | 0.4 | 2.28 | 0.5 | 2.76 | 0.9 | 5.05 |
| 14 | "Til Dex Do Us Part" | February 12, 2020 | 0.4 | 2.38 | 0.5 | 2.73 | 0.9 | 5.11 |
| 15 | "At All Costs: The Conrad Costas Chronicles" | February 19, 2020 | 0.4 | 2.23 | 0.5 | 2.78 | 0.9 | 5.01 |
| 16 | "All Quiet On the Dextern Front" | March 4, 2020 | 0.4 | 2.32 | 0.5 | 2.73 | 0.9 | 5.06 |
| 17 | "The Dex Files" | March 18, 2020 | 0.5 | 2.68 | 0.5 | 2.68 | 1.0 | 5.35 |
| 18 | "All Hands on Dex" | March 25, 2020 | 0.5 | 2.68 | 0.4 | 2.71 | 0.9 | 5.39 |
