= Santa Rosa historic landmarks =

Santa Rosa, California's Cultural Heritage Board recommends sites for Designated Landmark status. The City Council makes the final decisions regarding designations.

Santa Rosa's designations are independent of state and federal designations; the Luther Burbank Home & Gardens however is also designated a California Historical Landmark and as a U.S. National Historic Landmark (and therefore is also listed on the National Register of Historic Places. The County of Sonoma's historic landmark designations intentionally exclude sites within the cities in the county.

== List of Santa Rosa historic landmarks ==
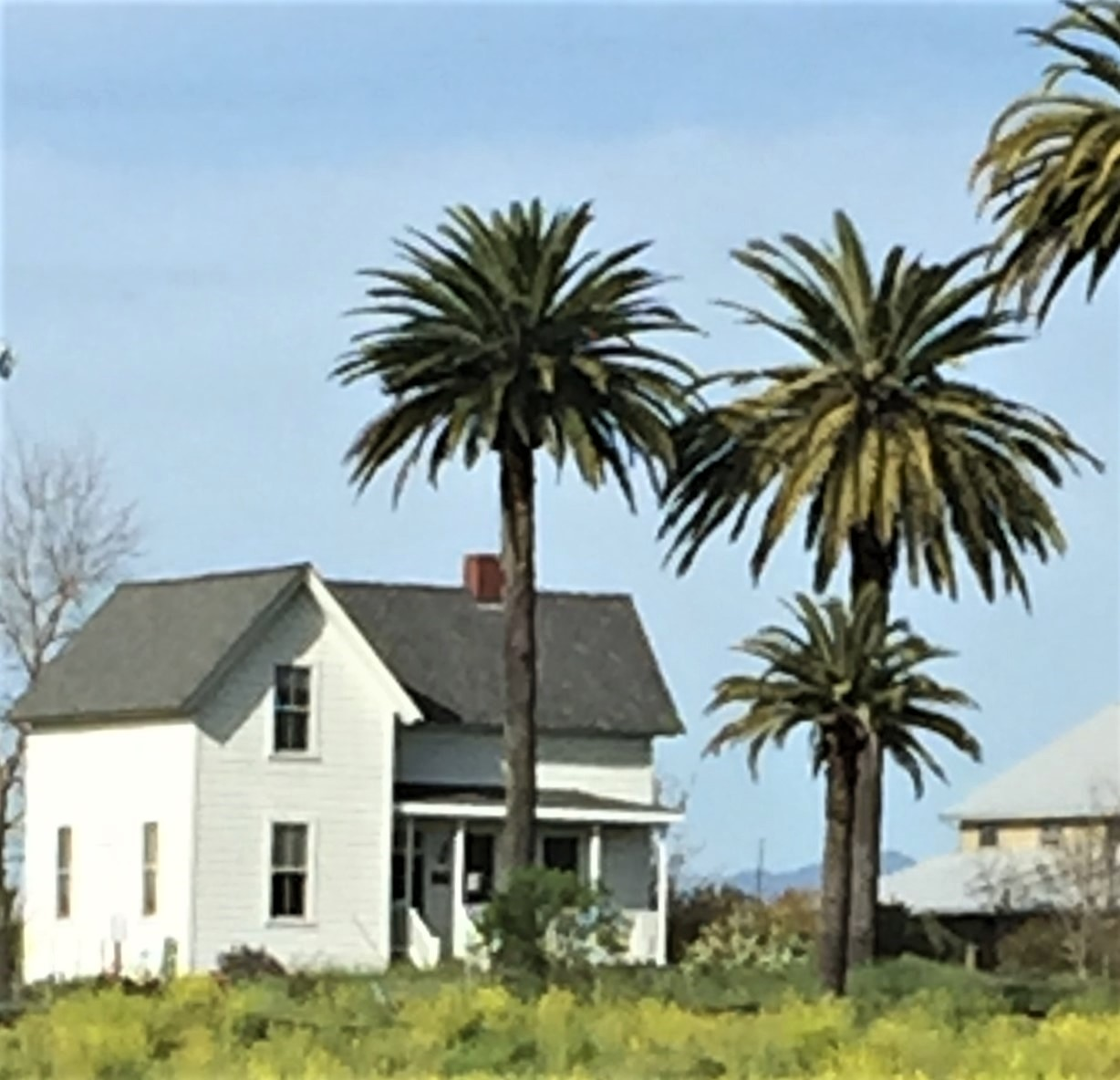
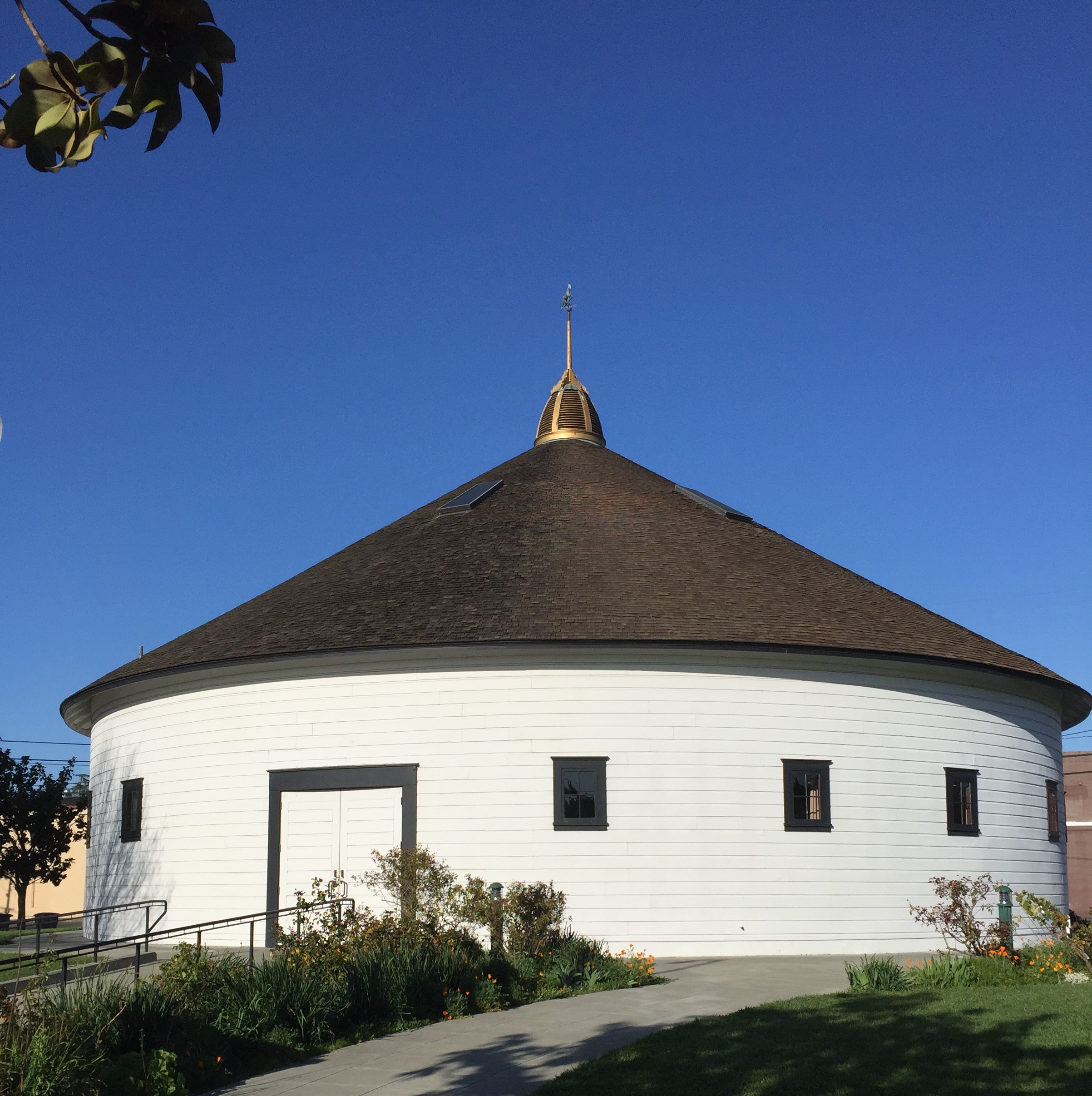
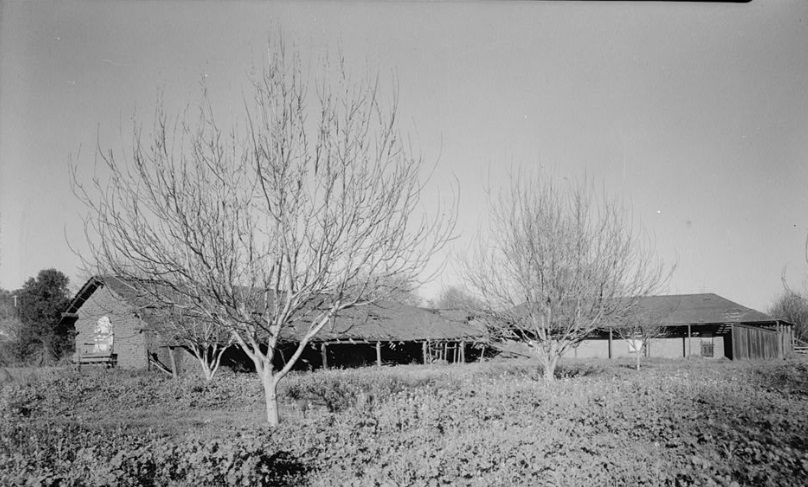
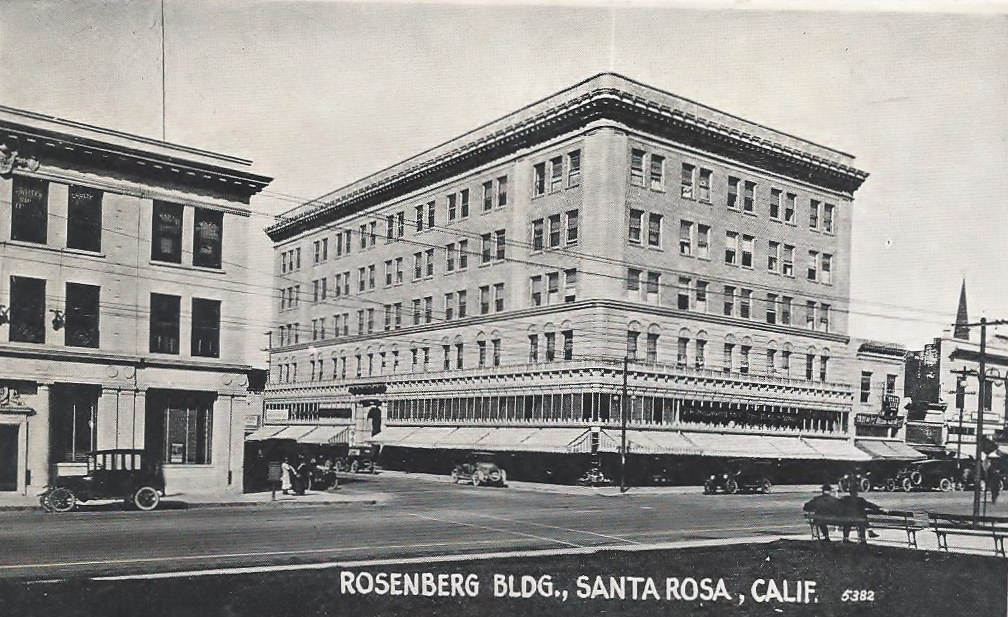
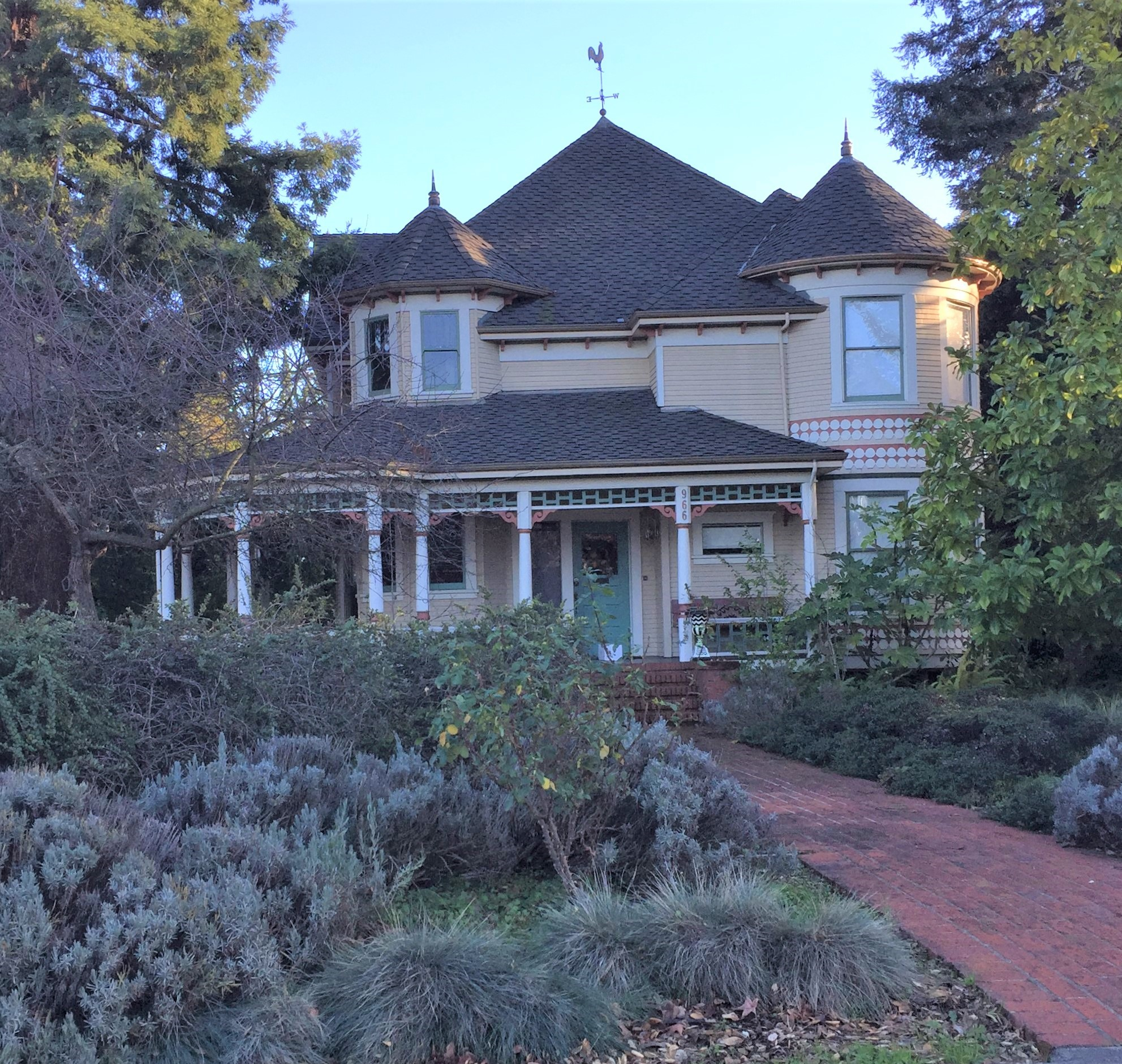
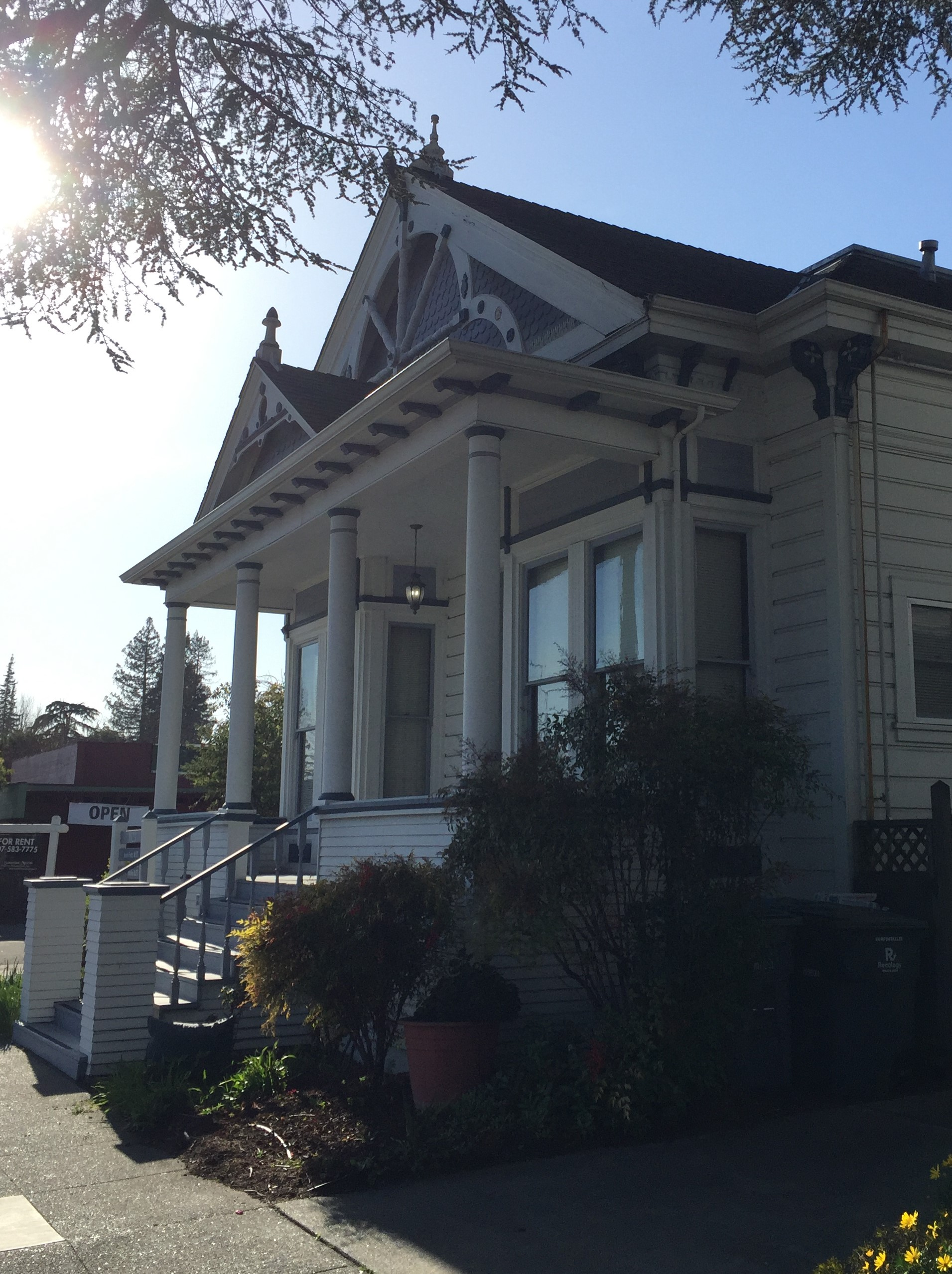
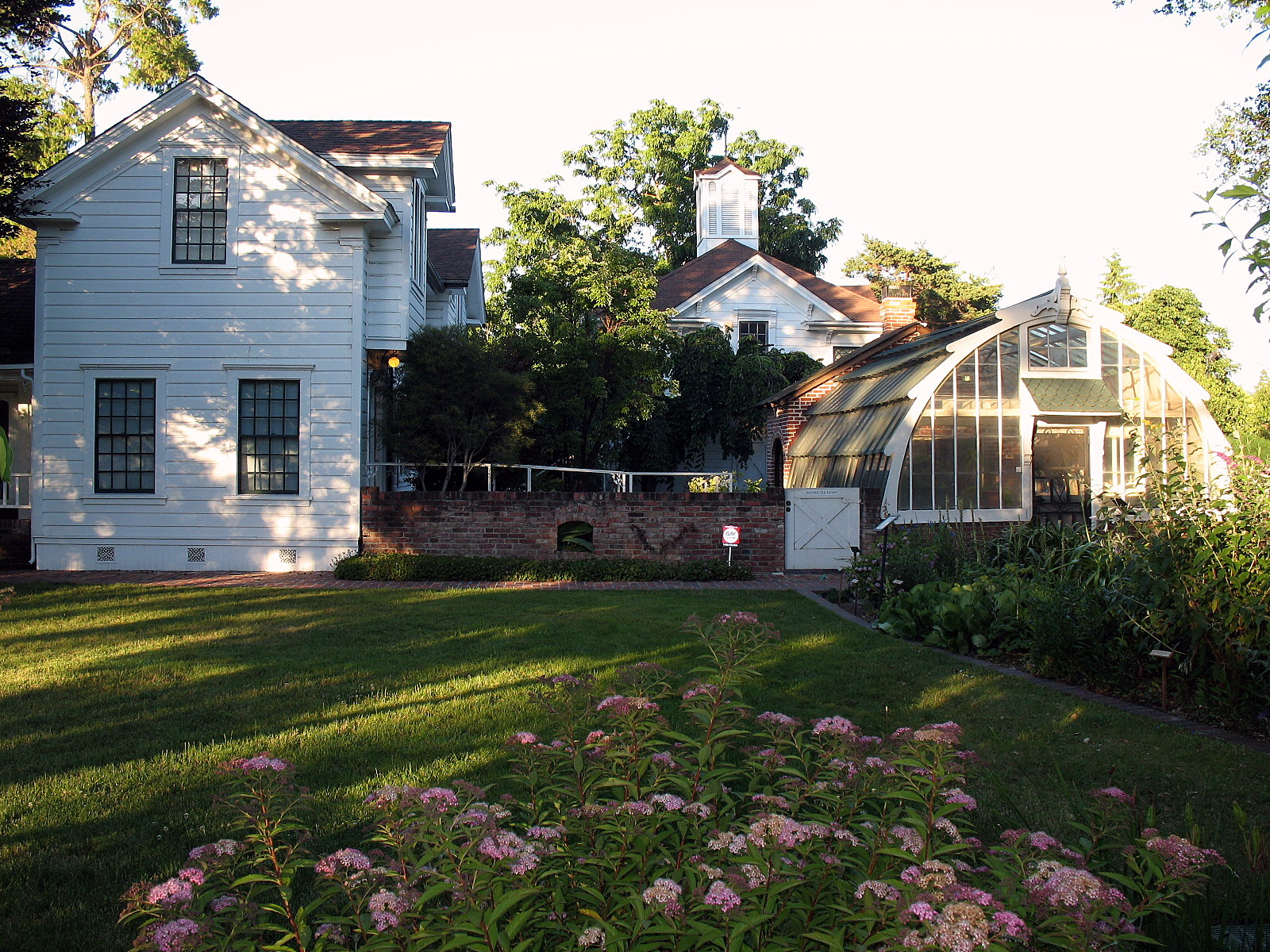
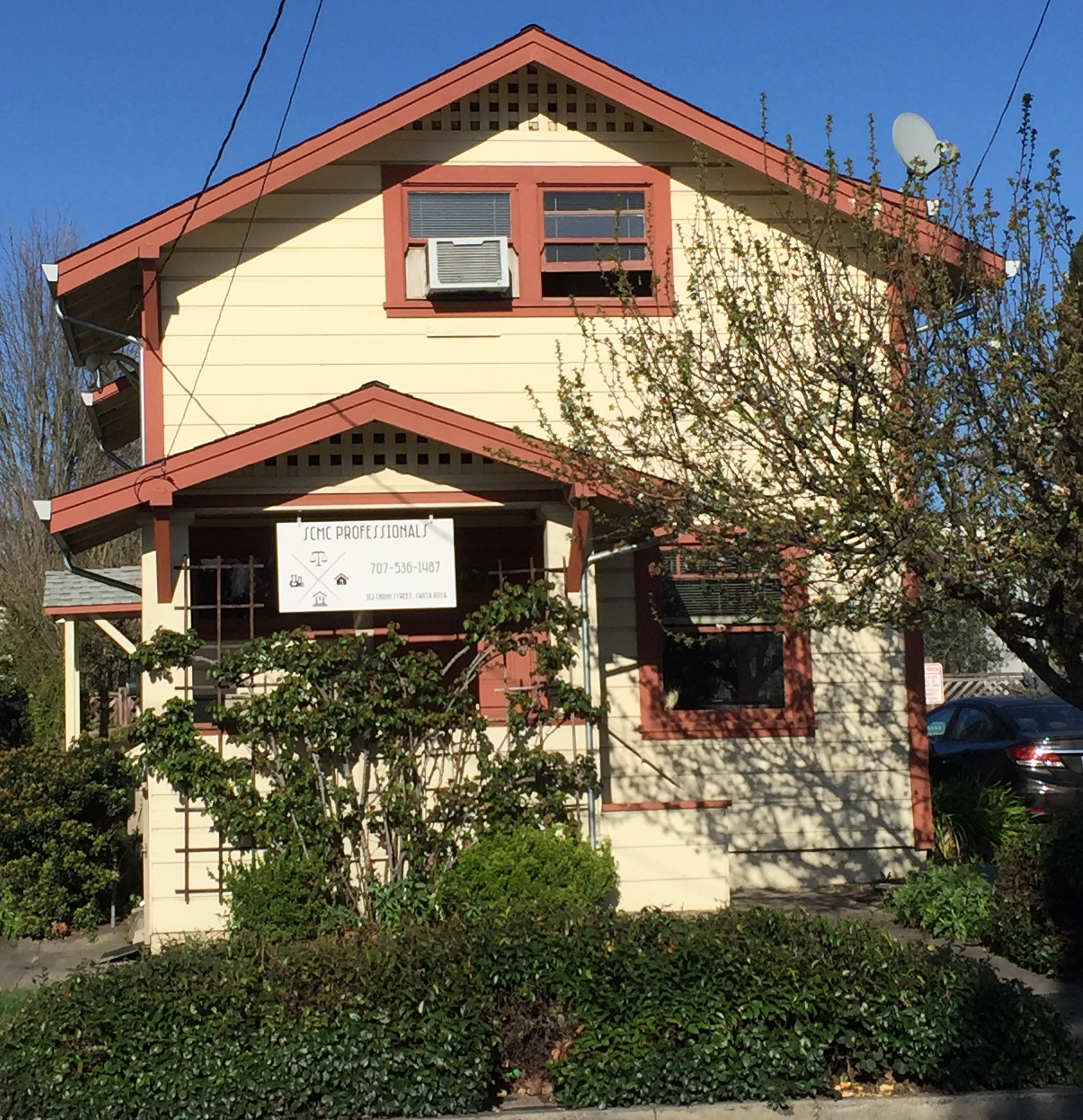
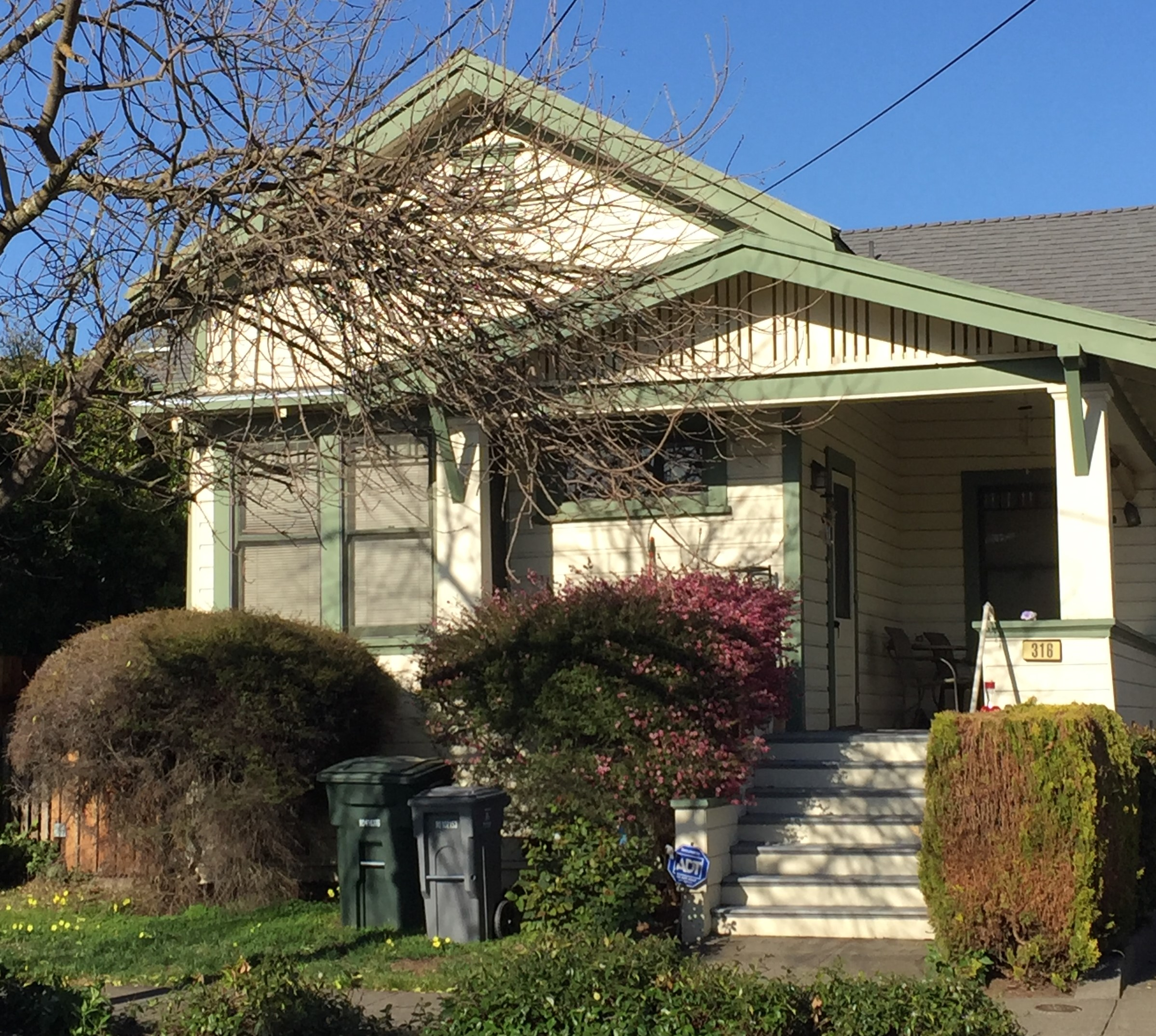
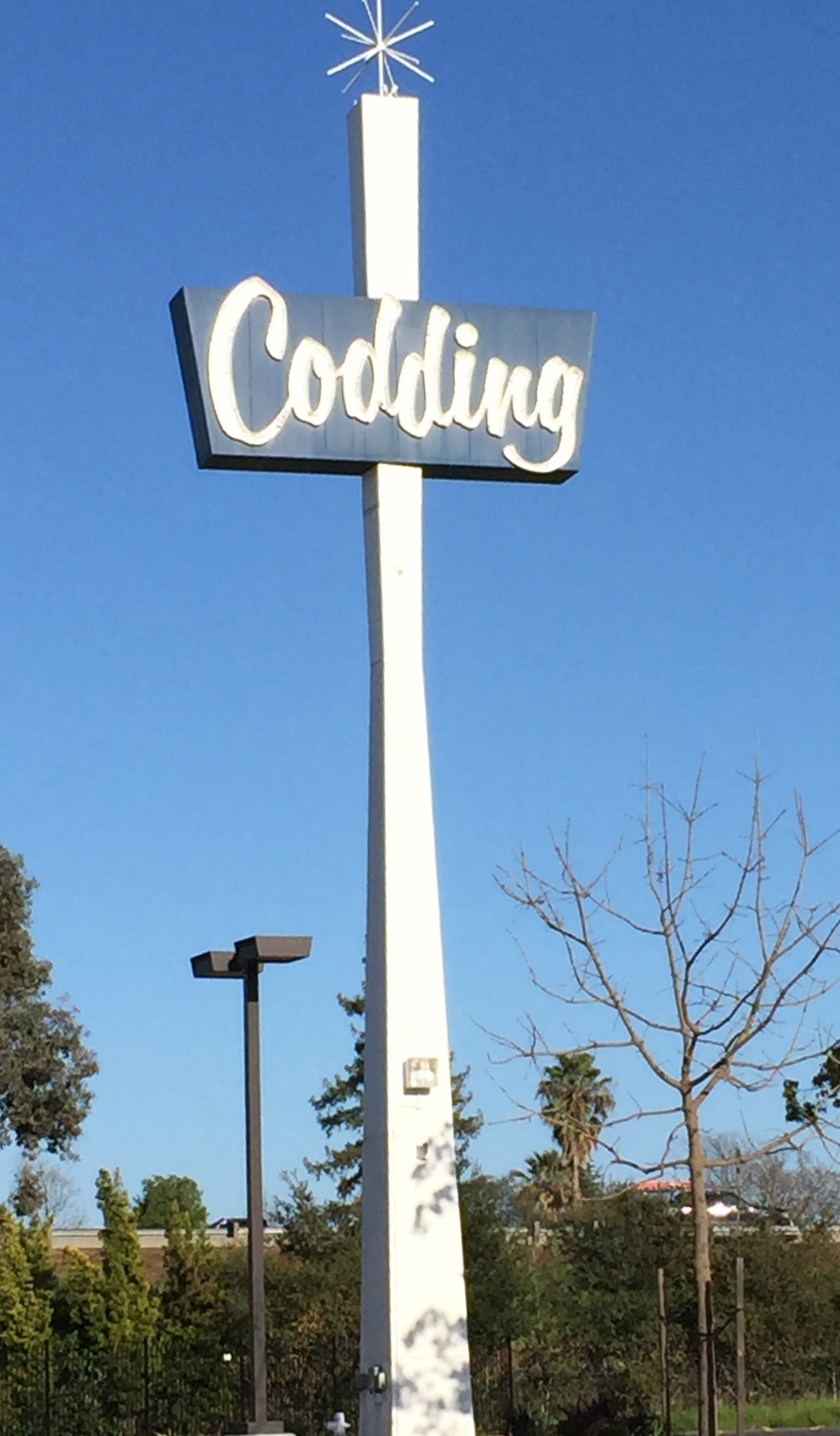
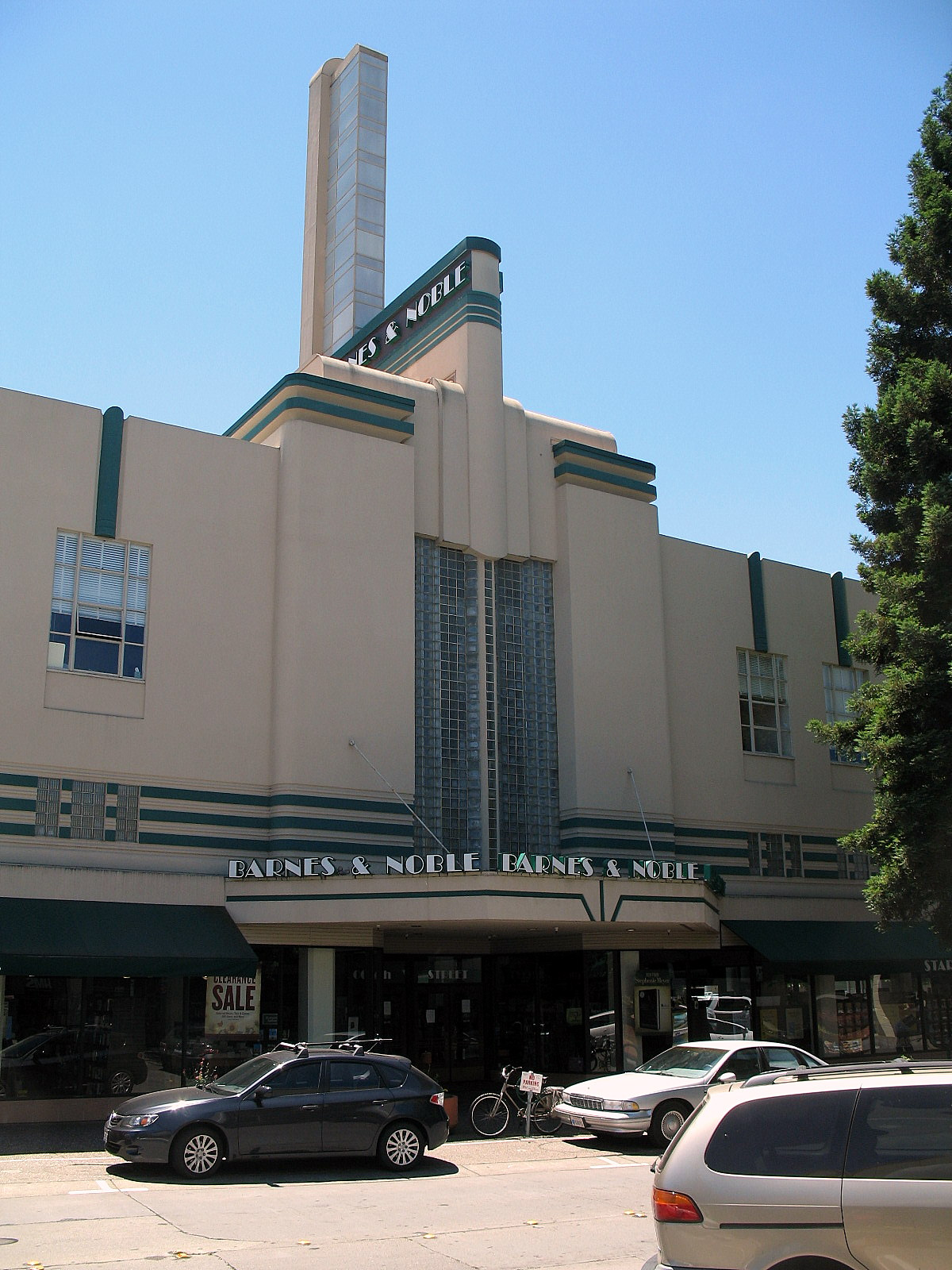
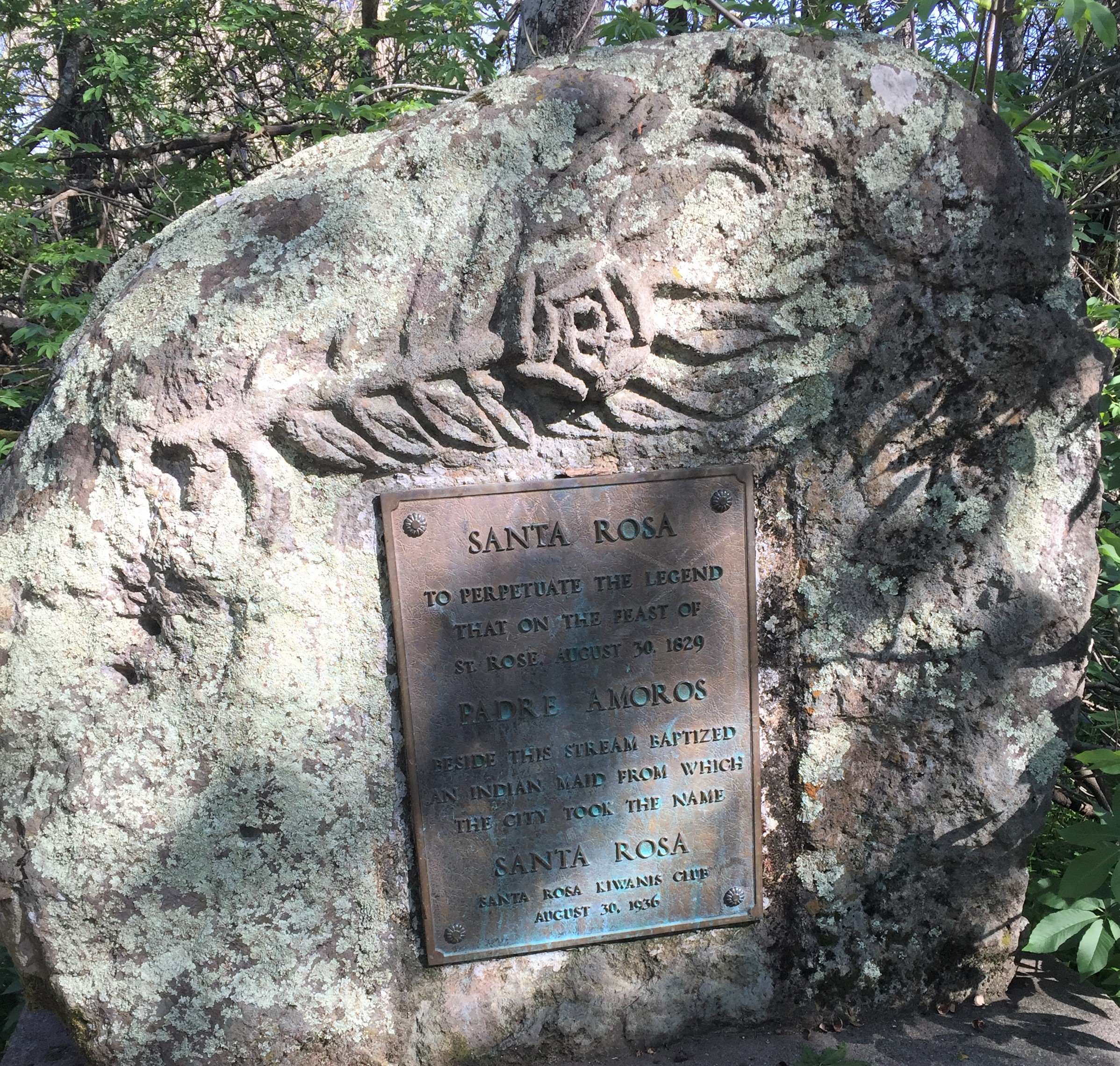
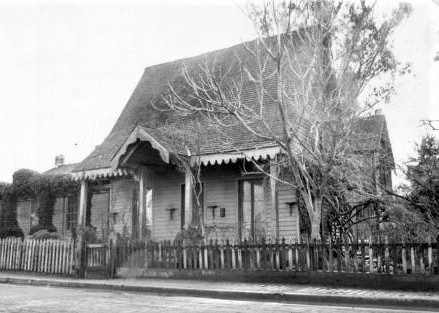
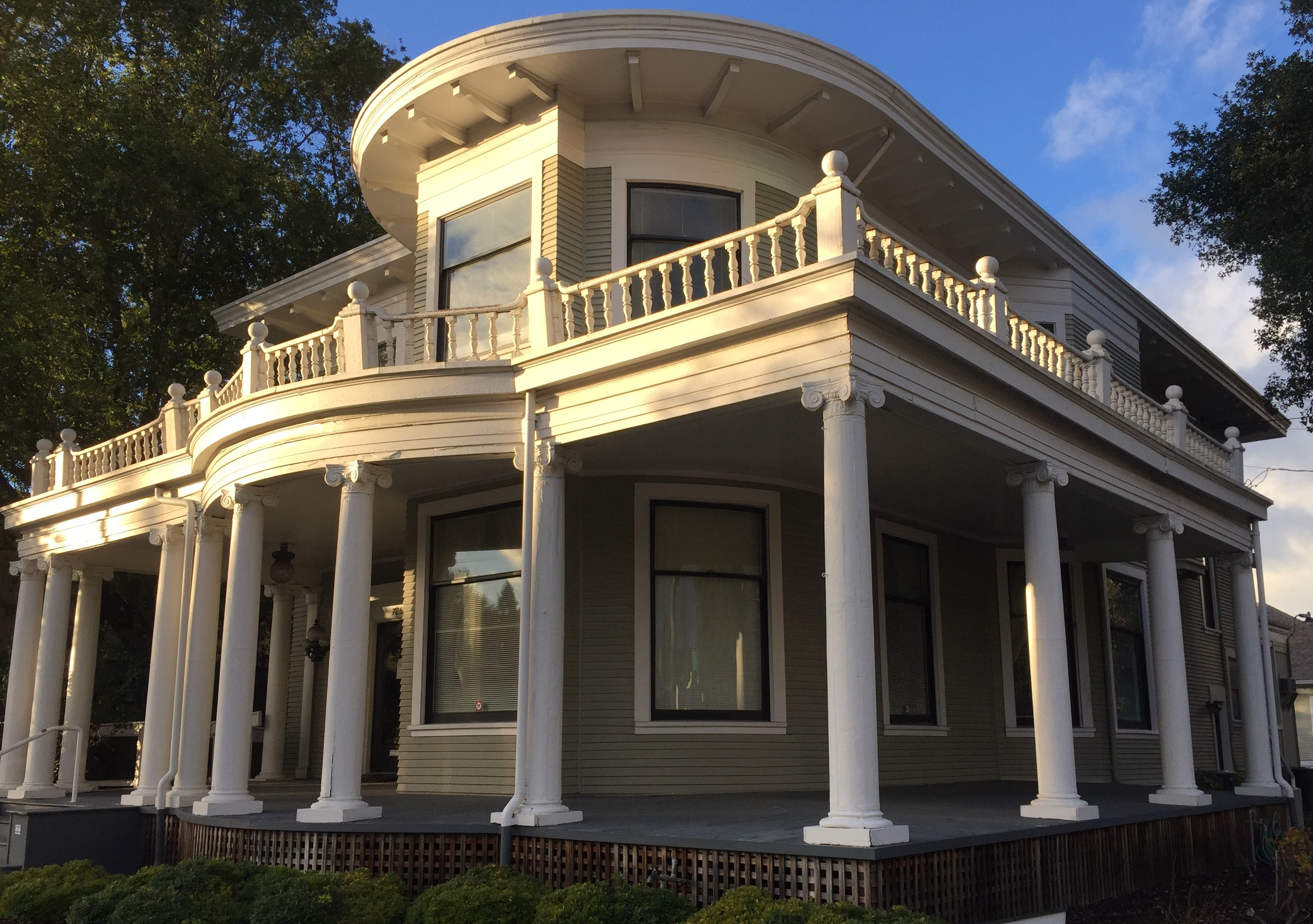
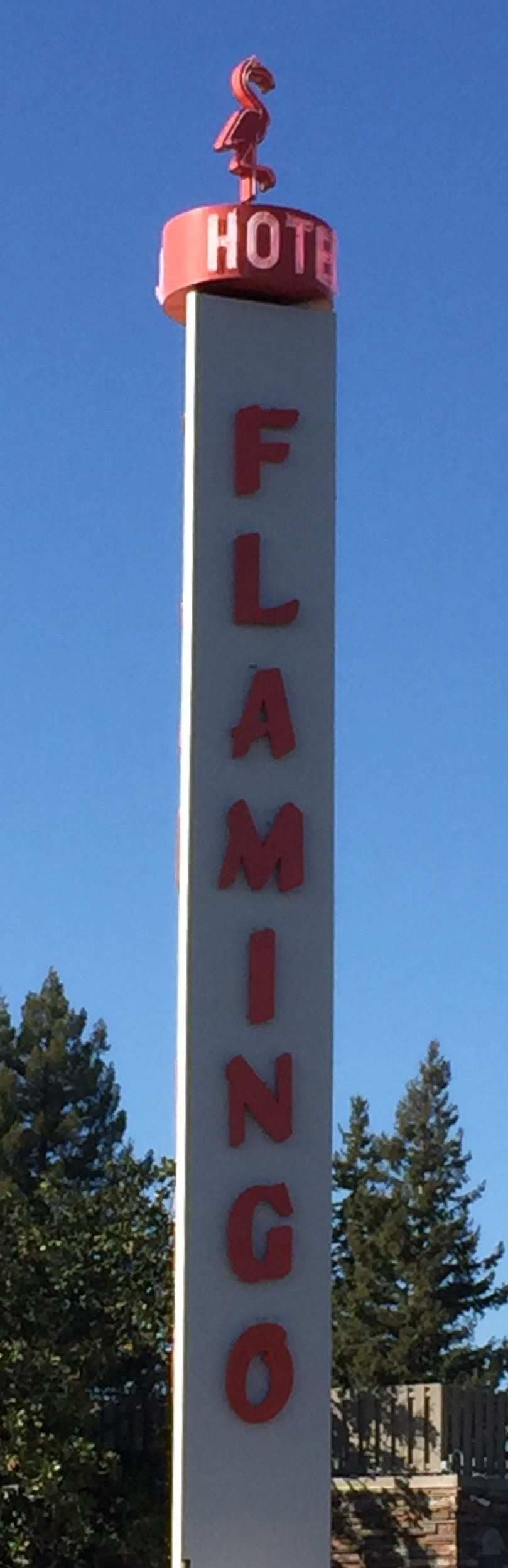
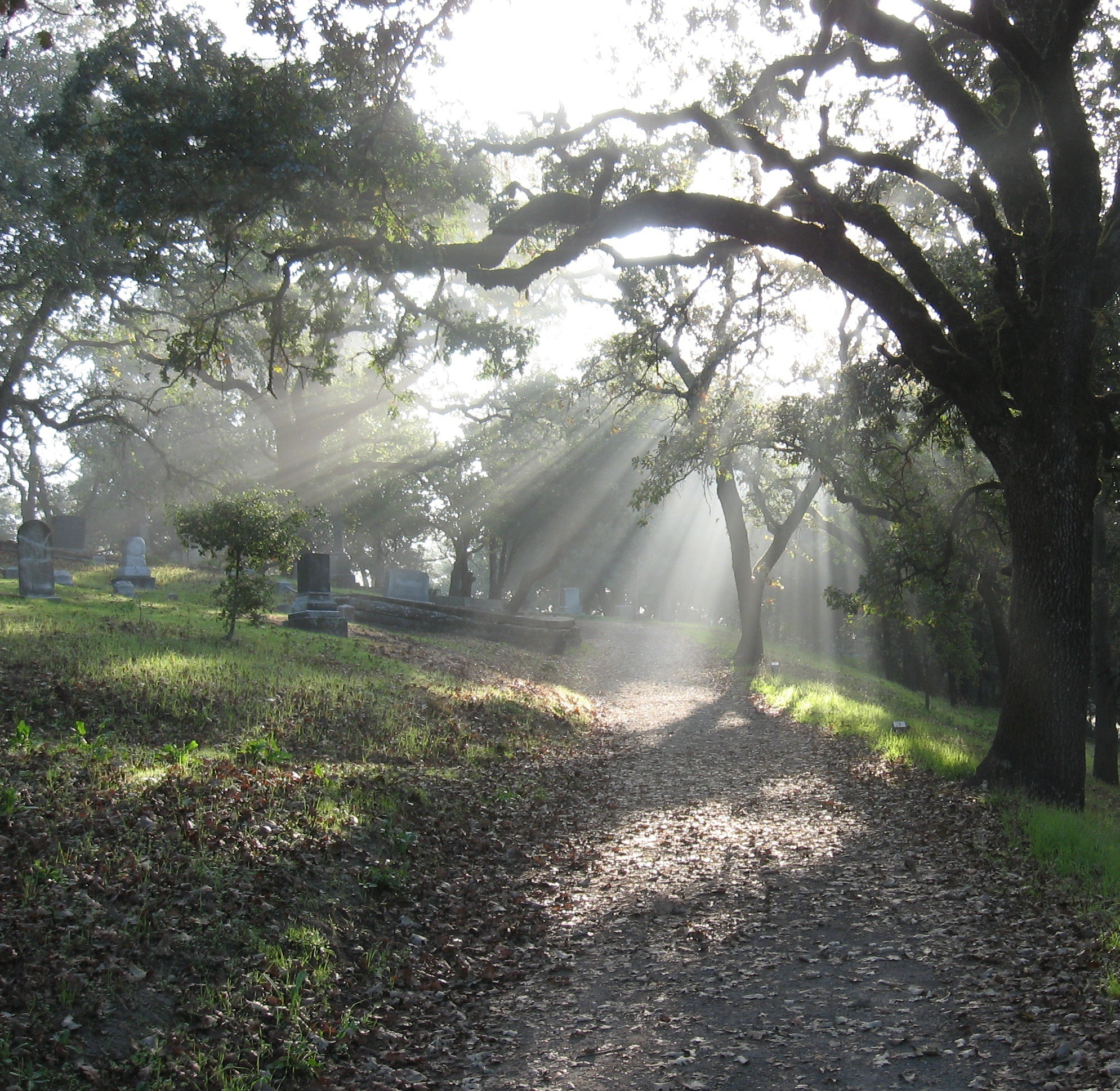
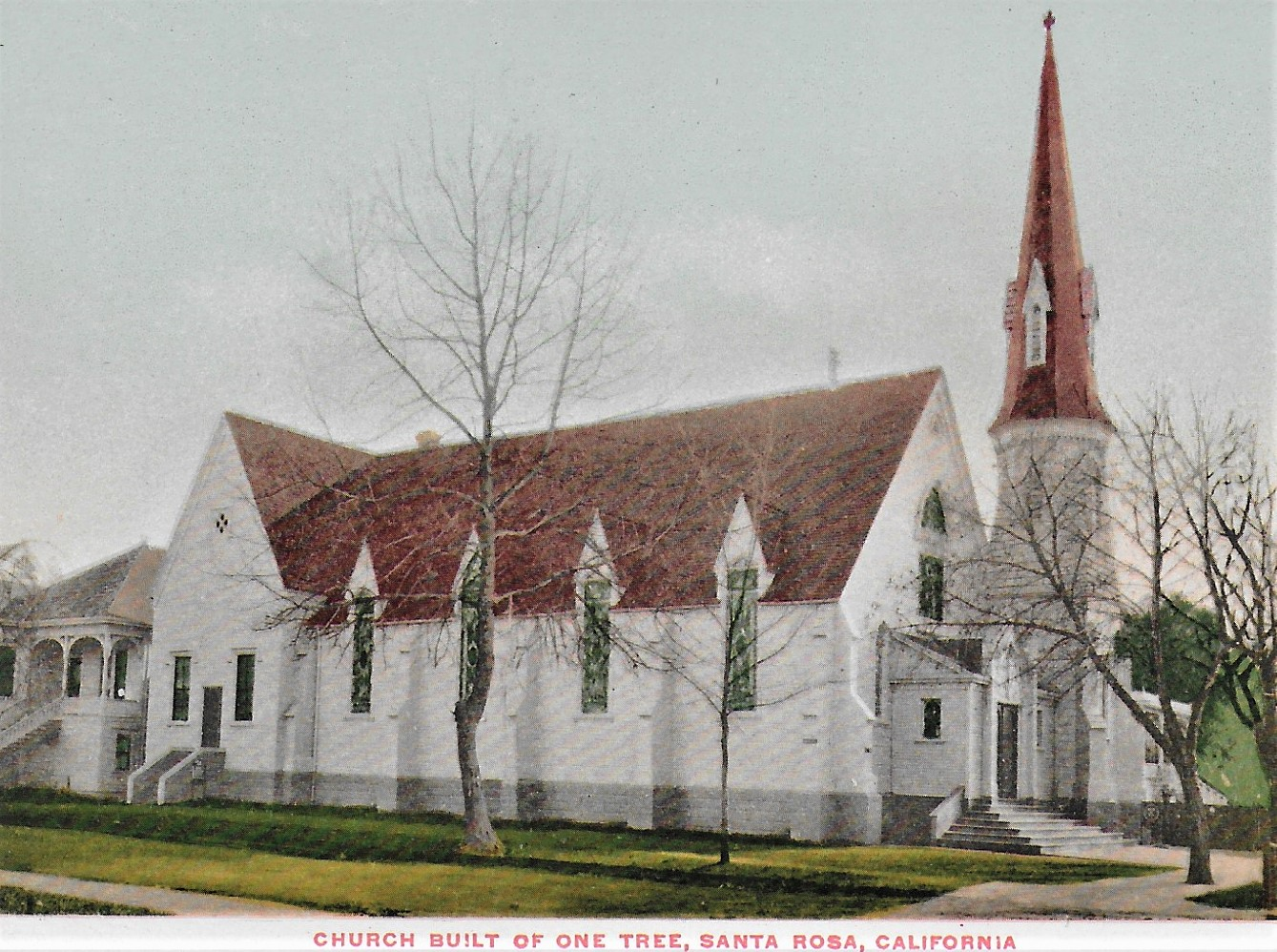
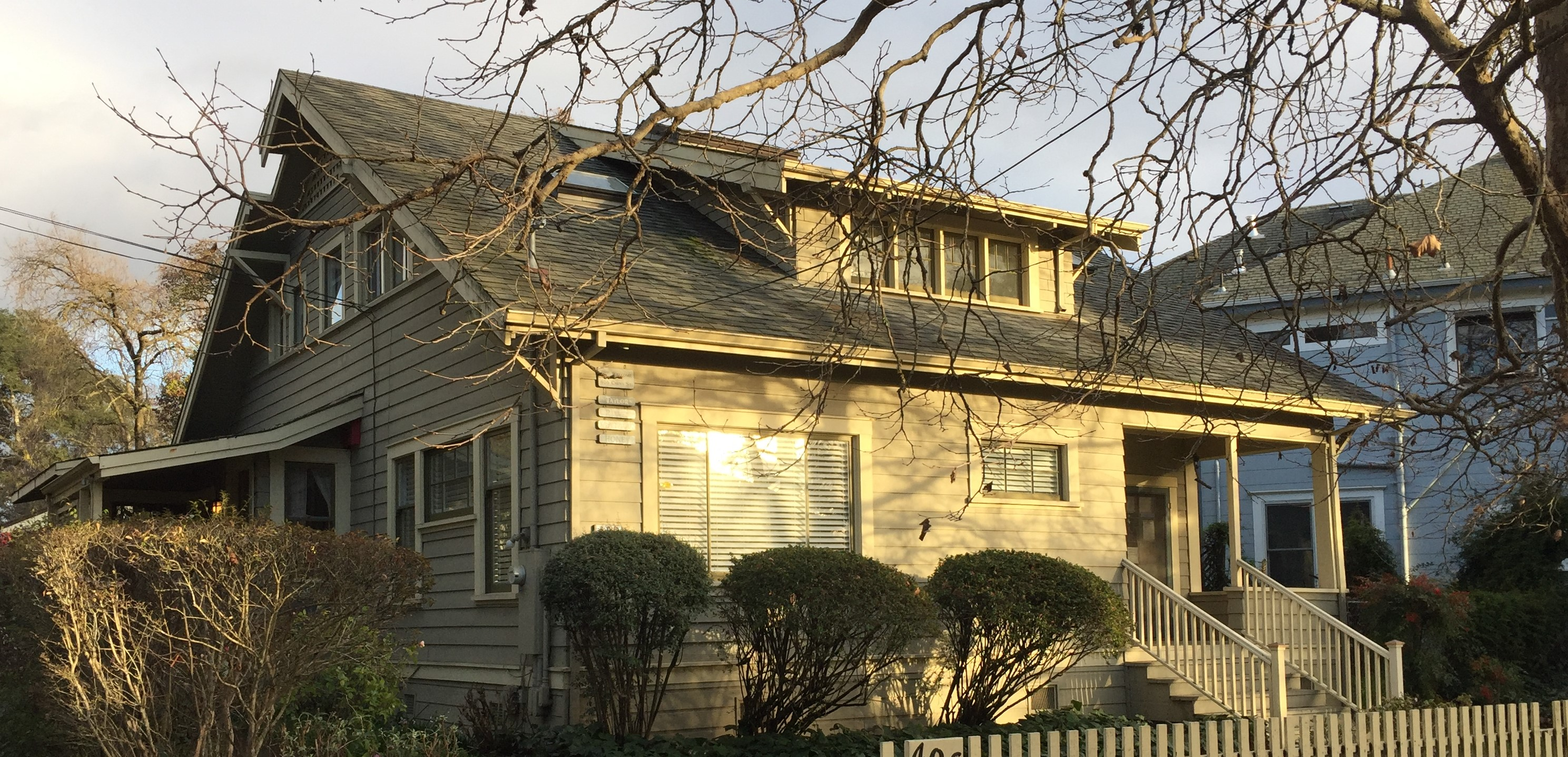
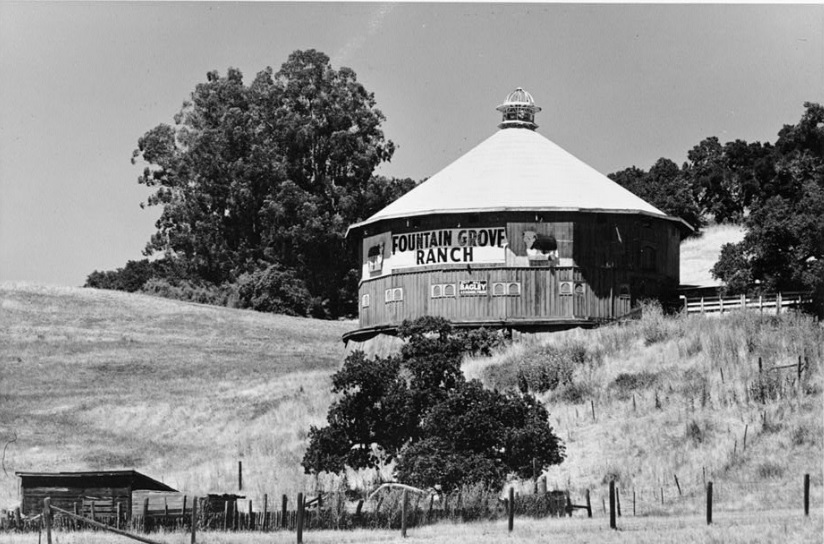
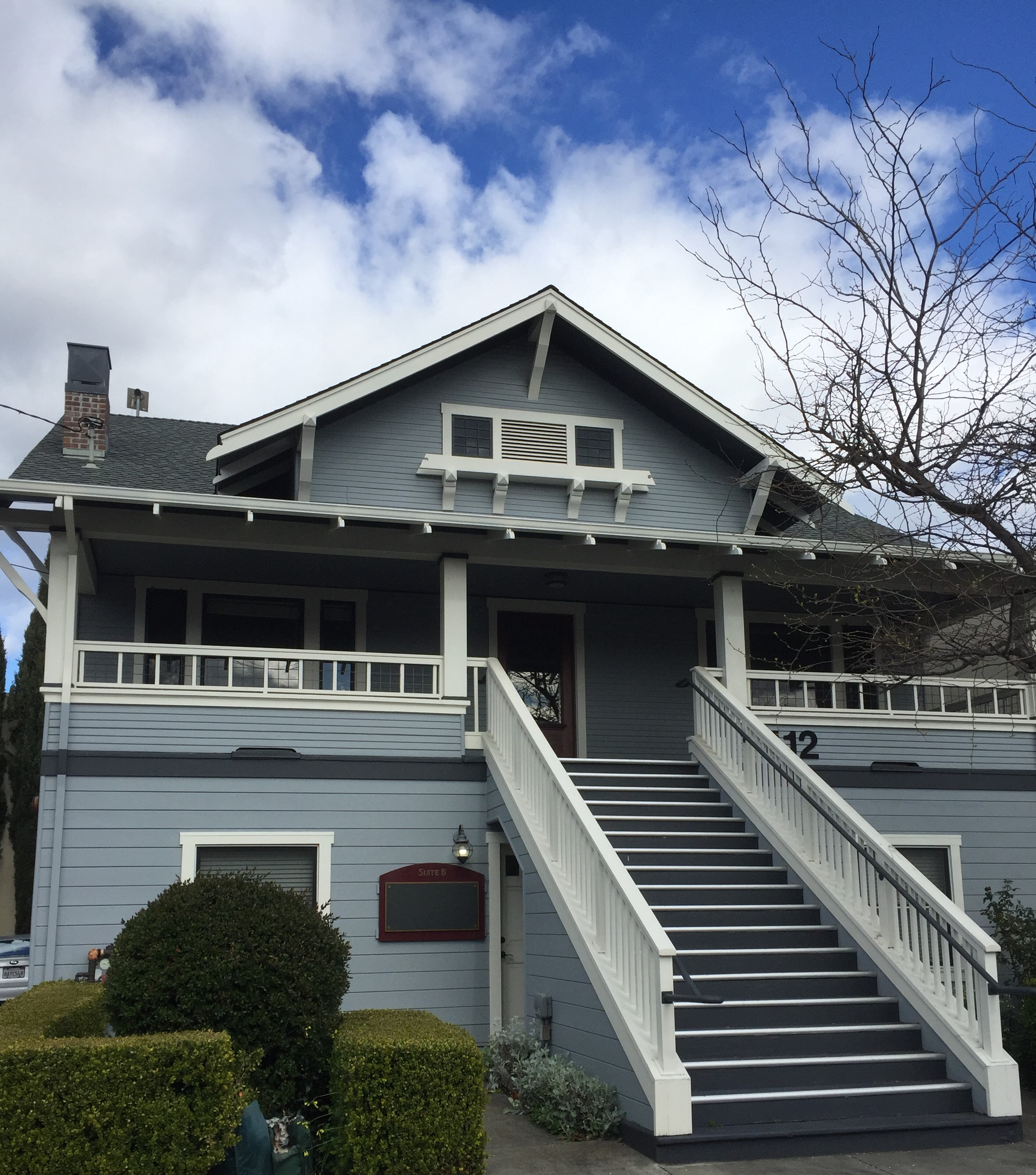
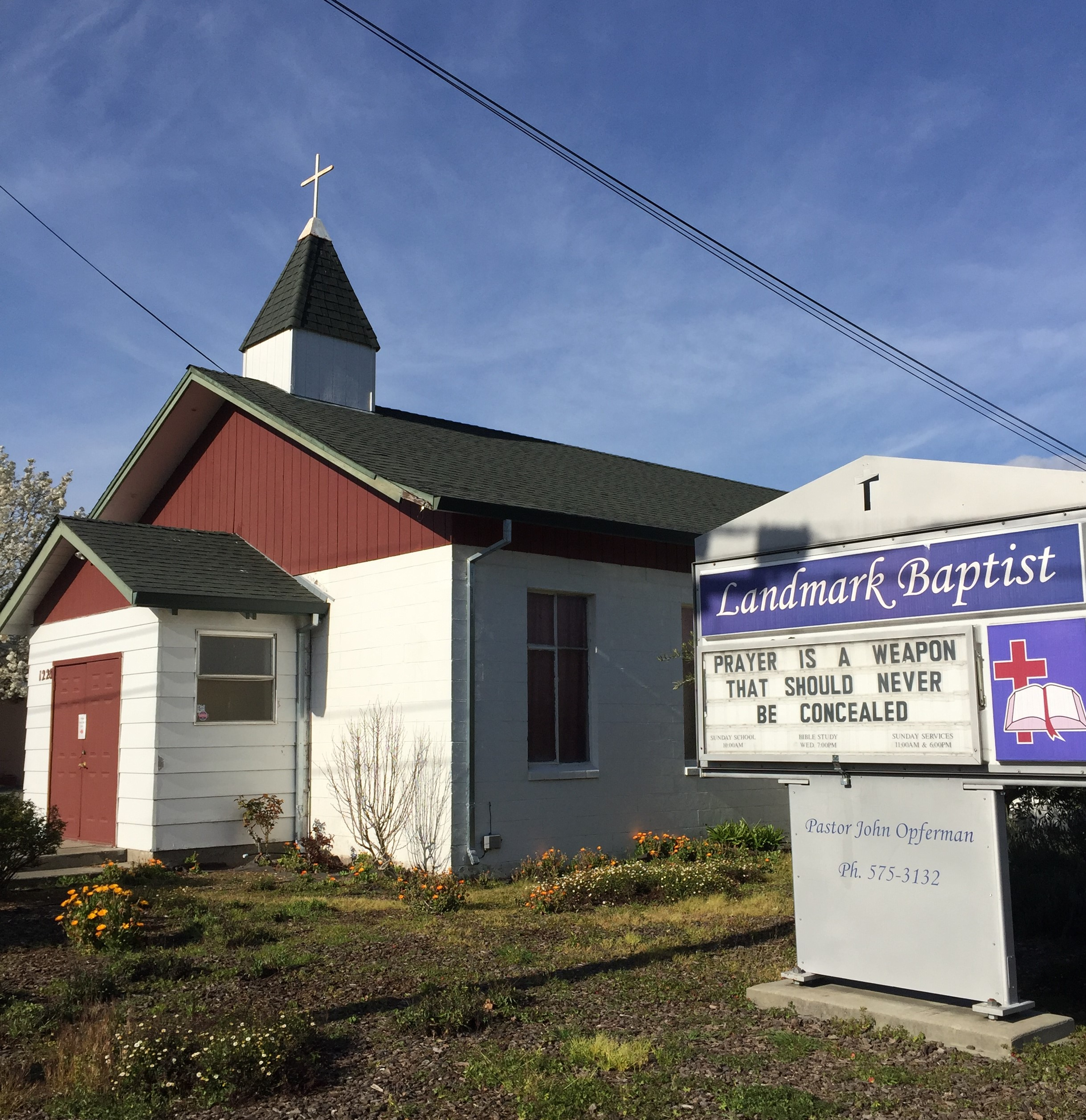
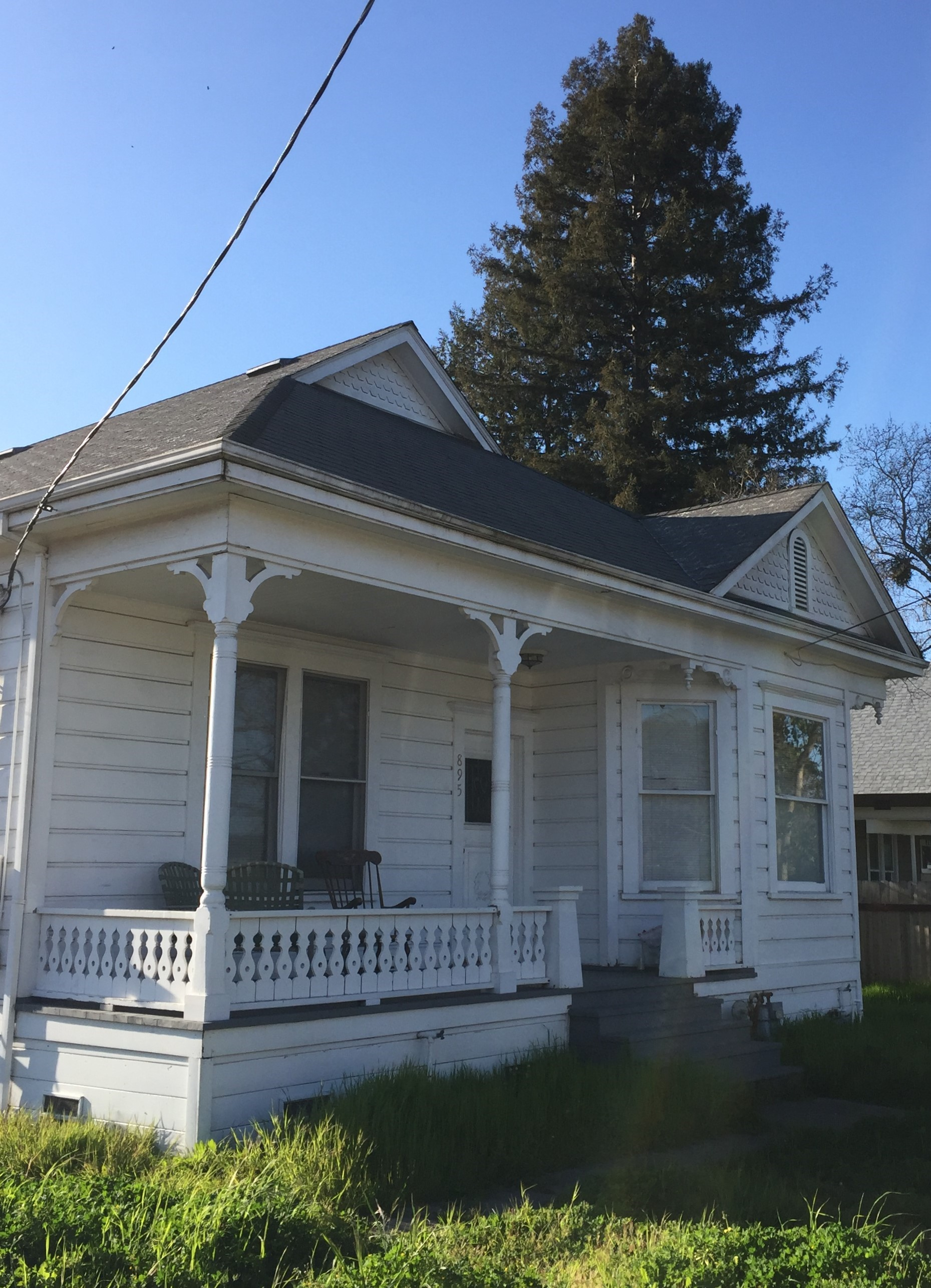
Landmark Number	Name	Location	Image	CHB Resolution No./ CHB Date	CC Resolution No./ CC Date	Notes	APNs
1	Miller Ranch (Stone Family Farm)	Occidental & Sanford Roads; 38.425217°N 122.825224°W	Stone Family Farm (Laguna Center)	chb4/ 10/26/1988			130-250-14, 130-250-49, 130-250-50, 060-330-10
2	De Turk Round Barn	819 Donahue Street; 38.440815°N 122.725211°W	DeTurk Round Barn built in 1891	chb8/ 11/9/1988		Now in a city park available for rent for weddings and events.	010-144-19
3	Carrillo Adobe	Montomery Drive 38.448548°N 122.683604°W	Carrillo Adobe built in 1829	chb11/ 11/29/1988			013-271-01, 013-274-02
4	Rosenberg Building	306 Mendocino Avenue; 38.440837°N 122.714155°W		chb13/ 3/22/1989			009-011-02
5	Bolton House	966 Sonoma Avenue; 38.439968°N 122.702917°W	The Walter and Isabel Bolton House	chb15/ 6/14/1989			009-211-81
6	Tripp House	1023 Fourth Street; 38.444032°N 122.706736°W	Tripp House built in 1891.	chb16/ 9/13/1989			009-102-34
7	Luther Burbank Home & Gardens	Southeast corner of Santa Rosa and Sonoma Avenues; 38.436102°N 122.711809°W		chb29/ 1/23/1991		California Historical Landmark #234, and a U.S. National Historic Landmark	009-265-15, 009-265-28
8	312, 316 Chinn Street - Structures Adjacent to Tripp House	1023 Fourth Street; 38.444032°N 122.706736°W	312 Chinn Street. 316 Chinn Street built prior to 1915.	chb41/ 8/26/1992	cc21023/ 9/29/1992		009-102-20, 009-102-34
9	Coddingtown Revolving sign Tower	101 Coddingtown Center; 38.458578°N 122.727114°W	Coddingtown Revolving Sign installed in 1960	chb44 / 12/9/1992 (denied)	cc21185/ 1/26/1993
10	Rosenberg's Department Store	700 Fourth Street; 38.441194°N 122.711698°W		chb47/ 4/27/1994	cc21775/ 6/7/1994	Principal tenant in 2019 is Barnes & Noble	009-014-12
11	Santa Rosa Plaque	Hampton Woods property, at the confluence of Santa Rosa Creek and Brush Creek	Plaque Honoring the Legend of the Naming of Santa Rosa	chb49/ 4/27/1994
12	Hoag House	6102 Sonoma Highway	Hoag House built in 1856. No longer standing.	chb61/ 8/23/1995	cc22426/ 10/3/1995	Dismantled and stored by City of Santa Rosa. Inadequate protection led to loss of entire fabric of remaining materials.
13				unassigned
14	Sara Building (Sibbald-Donovan Manor)	725 College Avenue; 38.445736°N 122.713746°W	Sara Building (Sibbald-Donovan Manor)	chb0062/ 1/24/1996	cc22610/ 3/5/1996		012-023-011
15	Flamingo Resort Sign Tower to include neon-outlined flamingo atop the sign tower	2777 Fourth Street; 38.450862°N 122.688564°W	Flamingo Hotel revolving sign installed in 1955	chb65/ 10/23/1996	cc22990/ 1/14/1997		032-030-002
16	Santa Rosa Rural Cemetery	1900 Franklin Avenue; 38.455624°N 122.704274°W	The Santa Rosa Rural Cemetery had its first burials in the 1850s.	chb72/ 6/11/1997	cc23251/ 8/19/1997		015-281-002, 015-281-004, 015-281-006
17	Church of One Tree	492 Sonoma Avenue; 38.436004°N 122.714060°W		chb77/ 11/12/1997	cc23412/ 1/13/1998	Moved from Ross and B Streets by the City of Santa Rosa in 1957. Now in Juilliard Park on Sonoma Avenue and available to rent for events.	010-208-022
18	Rose Park House	406 Chinn Street; 38.444756°N 122.707066°W	406 Chinn Street - Rose Park House	chb79/ 1/14/1998	cc23476/ 3/24/1998		009-102-023
19	Fountaingrove Round Barn	3535 Round Barn Boulevard; 38.475700°N 122.727450°W	Fountain Grove Round Barn	chb98/ 2/9/2000	cc24329/ 3/21/2000	burned completely in Tubbs Fire in 2017	173-020-004
20	Alexander House	412 Humboldt Street; 38.442188°N 122.713142°W	Joseph Alexander house - 412 Humboldt Street	chb1148/ 3/26/2003	cc25668/ 6/10/2003
21	Community Baptist Church	1228 Grand Avenue; 38.426882°N 122.706669°W	Community Baptist Church - 1228 Grand Avenue	chb216/ 7/19/2006	cc3794/ 10/10/2006	File No. STU05-014
22	Dutton Avenue Queen Anne	895 Dutton Avenue; 38.427237°N 122.725169°W	Queen Anne style Cottage - 895 Dutton Avenue	chb244/ 3/5/2008			125-271-005

== See also ==
- List of National Historic Landmarks in California
- California Historical Landmarks in Sonoma County, California
