= Church of One Tree =

Historic wooden building in Santa Rosa, California

Coordinates: 38°26′10″N 122°42′50″W

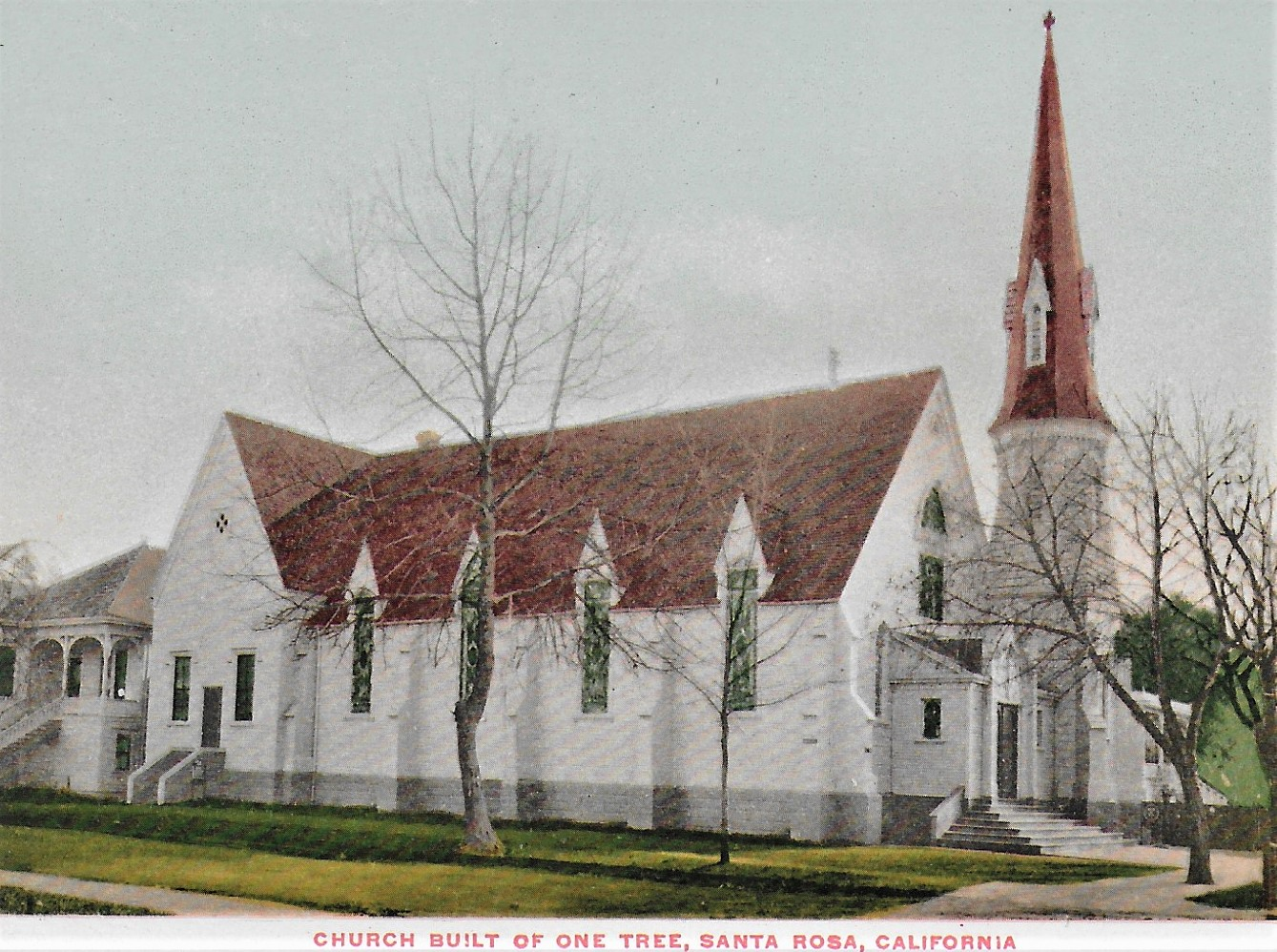
The Church of One Tree, 1918 postcard, by Edward H. Mitchell.

The Church of One Tree is a historic building in the city of Santa Rosa, California, United States. It was built in 1873/4 from a single redwood tree milled in Guerneville, California.

Guerneville was the site of an ancient coastal redwood forest, much of which was logged for the rebuilding of San Francisco after the 1906 earthquake and fire. Prior to being renamed for one of the local milling families, Guerneville was called Stumptown for the giant redwood stumps left by the loggers.

The tree used to construct the church stood 275 feet (84 m) high and was 18 feet (5.5 m) in diameter. The single tree, when milled, produced 78,000 board feet (180 m^{3}) of lumber, with the lumber costing a total of $3,000. The church was the original home of the First Baptist Church of Santa Rosa, located in downtown on B Street. It was moved to its current location to avoid destruction.

In recent decades, the building has been used for several other unique purposes. Robert Ripley, a native of Santa Rosa, wrote about the Church of One Tree – where his mother attended services – in one of his earliest installments of “Believe It or Not!” In 1970, the Church of One Tree was repurposed as the Ripley Memorial Museum which was stocked with curiosities and “Believe it or Not!” memorabilia for nearly two decades. From the 1950s until 1998 it was the Ripley Memorial Museum. Starting in 2008 and continuing through 2009, the City of Santa Rosa utilized grant funding to re-lead the stained glass windows, as well as repair, paint and renovate the interior of the church, and the Recreation and Parks Department rents out the space for events. It is located adjacent to Juilliard Park and less than one block from the Luther Burbank Home and Gardens historic site.
