= Luther Burbank Rose Parade and Festival =

Annual festival in California, U.S.

- Status: Active
- Inaugurated: 1894
- Website: www.roseparadefestival.com

The Luther Burbank Rose Parade and Festival is an annual festival held in Santa Rosa, California celebrating Luther Burbank. The festival includes activities for all ages, and is held on the third Saturday in May. In 1994 the Luther Burbank Rose Parade and Festival became a tax-exempt event. It has an annual budget of around $100,000. The budget is for production of the parade and festival. This is achieved through grants, donations, vendor and entrance fees. The parade has a yearly theme, which allows new activities, displays and floats yearly.

== History ==
=== Founding ===
The Rose Parade began in 1894, then called the Rose Carnival, with the help of Thomas Patrick Keegan, to celebrate the landscape Sonoma County. Keegan was a city engineer and clothier in Santa Rosa. He “conceived the moving exhibit of community pride and creativity” many years ago. Brian Keegan, a descendant of Thomas Patrick Keegan, was President of the Rose Parade and Festival board a few years ago. He sought to continue the legacy of his ancestor in bringing civic pride to the community. Brian Keegan still currently serves on the board.

In the early 1900s, the parade and festival was organized by the collaboration of the Chamber of Commerce and other civic organizations. In typical parade fashion, the participants included various groups atop ornately ordained floats, automobiles, marching bands and note-worthy community members. The floats in the procession included various species of flowers, not just roses. Unlike in present day, the event was not seen as a casual affair. Patrons and spectators alike dressed lavishly to attend the parade and festival. The parade and festival was seen as an event of the season in which people came from all around to engage in the rich display of natural beauty of Sonoma County.

=== Revival ===
The parade did not take place for the years spanning through the World Wars. It began anew in the 1950s when the Junior Chamber of Commerce undertook the task of organizing it once again. It is then that the parade was renamed in honor of Luther Burbank. After the long reprieve in the 1930s and 1940s, the organizers of the celebration took to inviting well-known figures to participate in the parade as Grand Marshals. One such person was Charles Schulz, giving a Peanuts flavor to the parade and carnival on that year. Others include government officials, local heroes, veterans and business owners. These prominent individuals served to help promote the parade and festival in sphere's outside the Santa Rosa locale.

Throughout the twentieth century, floats were designed to reflect popular culture at the time. Floats featuring baseball, women's solidarity, peace, pioneering, etc., were all present to promote the issues and interests of the times. Events often included foot and auto races, baby contests, and the like. 1909 marked an unprecedented project for the parade: a nighttime affair with lighted floats. It was an impressive undertaking in which “floats med lavish use of lighted designs and the parade included one float lighted by means of an electric trolley attached to the car line.” In light of the turbulent political times of the 1960s, a less jovial air was involved in the displays. In 1967 Ray Smith of The Press Democrat wrote, “Missing from this parade was laughter. There were no firemen in red pajamas squirting water, or clowns … In brief: there was no comedy in the units entered in the comical feature and miscellaneous category.” This was not the typical aura of the affair – most years are met with celebration and excitement from all involved.

In recent years, the parade has claimed close to a quarter million people in attendance per year. It often includes close to 4,000 volunteers. There is now a more regimented protocol for entrance into the parade, including a rule that states at least one rose must be seen by the judges or a point penalty will be incurred These rules are established in order to maintain safety and create a level evaluation platform for all entries. There are several categories in which to enter, with awards including: best entry using local history, best use of recycled material, best use of roses, best use of theme and several placement awards for various categories. The Rose Parade and Festival offers over $4,000 worth of awards to winners. The clowns in the parade are local business owners and community members that have made significant contributions to the organization. They call themselves the “Distinguished Clown Corps.” These individuals are trained by a professional clown in order to properly entertain the crowds. The dedication of community leaders to the Rose Parade and Festival serves to show the importance of the event to civic pride.

In the past, the parade route centered on the Luther Burbank Home and Gardens, winds down 4th Street and Mendocino Avenue to end near 1st Street. The festival takes place at Juilliard Park after the parade and includes much music, games, food and frivolity. It is also in this place that the award ceremony commences. In light of the recent economic decline, the festival has downsized from a three-day affair to that of only one.

=== Modern times ===
The 2024 Parade & Festival, the first since 2019, will be held on May 18, 2024 starting at 10am. The one day event features a 1/2 mile long parade on 4th Street from Hope to B, centering around Old Courthouse Square. Nearly 80 community groups will participate.

The festival has been significantly expanded to include many free activities for families as well as critical resources like a diaper changing and nursing station. The festival will have fun contests for the community to participate in and have a diverse array of performers that represent Sonoma County.

== Characteristics ==
The parade was always preceded by a gala, the Coronation Ball, in which a queen and royal court were selected to reign over the events of the weekend. This affair included a lavish orchestra, accompanied by much dancing. The “royal robes” were designed by a well-known clothier in San Francisco. A throne was erected in a pavilion in which the royal court sat to oversee the festivities. This pergola kept true to the flower theme by having “heavy pillars supporting the canopy of trailing vines and intermingling roses.”

In 1910, part of the festivities included a dedication of the new court house in Santa Rosa, overseen by the Queen of the Rose Parade. In later years, events would include sports competitions, fireworks, bicycle races and carnival games. Events began to stretch across the city, with golf tournaments, sailing contests, children's entertainment and dance competitions. On the 100th anniversary of the parade, a more fair-like atmosphere was introduced to the agenda. This included carnival games and other fun activities in which children could participate. More recently, cooking competitions and other theme-based activities have been worked into the agenda.

== Specific citations ==
- Luther Burbank Rose Parade and Festival, “History,” Luther Burbank Rose Parade and Festival, https://web.archive.org/web/20130330160550/http://roseparadefestival.com/about/history/ (accessed April 27, 2013).
- Luther Burbank Rose Parade and Festival, “FAQs,” Luther Burbank Rose Parade and Festival, (accessed April 27, 2013).
- “Rose Festival History Covers Santa Rosa's Most Colorful Event,” The Press Democrat, Rose Festival Section, May 1, 1951.
- Chris Smith, “'Vines' of Horror: Potential Soap Opera or Documentary?,” The Press Democrat, November 7, 2010. www.pressdemocrat.com/article/20101107/NEWS/11071014?tc=arf (accessed April 25, 2013).
- Luther Burbank Rose Parade and Festival, “Board,” Luther Burbank Rose Parade and Festival, https://web.archive.org/web/20130330161123/http://roseparadefestival.com/about/board/ (accessed April 27, 2013).
- “Magnificent Floral Show Glory of Santa Rosa,” The Press Democrat, May 17, 1908.
- Luther Burbank Rose Parade and Festival, “History,” Luther Burbank Rose Parade and Festival, https://web.archive.org/web/20130330160550/http://roseparadefestival.com/about/history/ (accessed April 27, 2013).
- Luther Burbank Rose Parade and Festival, “Past Grand Marshals,” Luther Burbank Rose Parade and Festival, http://roseparadefestival.com/about/pastgrandmarshals/ (accessed April 27, 2013).
- “Crowning of Queen Lillian Auspicious Opening of Fiesta” The Press Democrat, May 6, 1910.
- Luther Burbank Rose Parade and Festival, “History,” Luther Burbank Rose Parade and Festival, https://web.archive.org/web/20130330160550/http://roseparadefestival.com/about/history/ (accessed April 27, 2013).
- "The Four Seasons in Roses,” The Press Democrat, May 12, 1974.
- Luther Burbank Rose Parade and Festival, “History,” Luther Burbank Rose Parade and Festival, https://web.archive.org/web/20130330160550/http://roseparadefestival.com/about/history/ (accessed April 27, 2013).
- Brett Wilkison, “Get Ready for Rose Parade,” The Press Democrat, May 20, 2011. http://www.pressdemocrat.com/article/20110520/ARTICLES/110529927 (accessed April 20, 2013).
- “Floral Parade 'Greatest Ever,'” The Press Democrat, May 8, 1915.
- “Magnificent Floral Show Glory of Santa Rosa,” The Press Democrat, May 17, 1908.
- “Rose Festival History Covers Santa Rosa's Most Colorful Event,” The Press Democrat, Rose Festival Section, May 1, 1951.
- Ray Smith, “Rose Parade Swings Like Spirit of '67,” The Press Democrat, May 21, 1967.
- Luther Burbank Rose Parade and Festival, “FAQs,” Luther Burbank Rose Parade and Festival, (accessed April 27, 2013).
- Luther Burbank Rose Parade and Festival, “Guidelines,” Luther Burbank Rose Parade and Festival, http://roseparadefestival.com/guidelines/ (accessed April 18, 2013).
- Luther Burbank Rose Parade and Festival, “Award Categories,” Luther Burbank Rose Parade and Festival, http://roseparadefestival.com/parade/awardcategories/ (accessed April 27, 2013).
- Luther Burbank Rose Parade and Festival, “Clowns,” Luther Burbank Rose Parade and Festival, https://web.archive.org/web/20130401041312/http://roseparadefestival.com/parade/clowns/ (accessed April 2, 2013).
- Luther Burbank Rose Parade and Festival, “Parade Route,” Luther Burbank Rose Parade and Festival, http://roseparadefestival.com/parade/paraderoute/ (accessed April 27, 2013).
- Luther Burbank Rose Parade and Festival, “Festival,” Luther Burbank Rose Parade and Festival, https://web.archive.org/web/20130330155741/http://roseparadefestival.com/festival/ (accessed April 27, 2013).
