= Stumptown =

Stumptown is a name or nickname that has been applied to several places in the United States.

The name Stumpville likewise has appeared in various locales. Both of these names share the theme that U.S. town names before the mid-20th century were profuse because every village or roadside cluster of homes had its own name (in addition to whichever township was its legal municipality), in a way that the postal code system later deemphasized to the extent that many of the minor town names have now disappeared from current use (persisting solely in contexts such as historical documentation, reminiscences, and so on).

== "Stumptown" as a nickname ==
(Listed alphabetically by the state's name)

- Guerneville, California, was the site of an ancient coast redwood forest, much of which was logged for the rebuilding of San Francisco after the 1906 earthquake and fire. Prior to being renamed for one of the local milling families, Guerneville was called Stumptown for the giant redwood stumps left by the loggers. Each year Guerneville holds its "Stumptown Daze Parade" and a number of local businesses adopted the original name including Stumptown Brewery and Stumptown Nursery.
- Whitefish, Montana, was called Stumptown as the area was cleared for the train station.
- Matthews, North Carolina, was originally named Stumptown in the early 19th century after cotton farmers cleared the land, leaving tree stumps everywhere.
- Portland, Oregon, bears the nickname Stumptown, as well as several other nicknames. In the mid-19th century, the city's growth led residents to clear a lot of land quickly, but the tree stumps were not immediately removed; in some areas, there were so many that people used to jump from stump to stump to avoid the muddy, unpaved roads. The nickname is used in the names of several local businesses, including Stumptown Coffee Roasters, a comic book series named Stumptown, the Stumptown Comics Fest, and others.

== "Stumptown" as the official name ==
(Listed alphabetically by the state's name)

- Stumptown, Indiana, is an unincorporated community in Parke County.
- Stumptown, Loudoun County, Virginia, is an unincorporated community.
- Stumptown, Northampton County, Virginia, is an unincorporated community.
- Stumptown, West Virginia, is an unincorporated community in Gilmer County.
