= Luther Burbank Home and Gardens =

Historic house in California, United States

- Luther Burbank House and Garden
- U.S. National Register of Historic Places
- U.S. National Historic Landmark
- California Historical Landmark No. 234
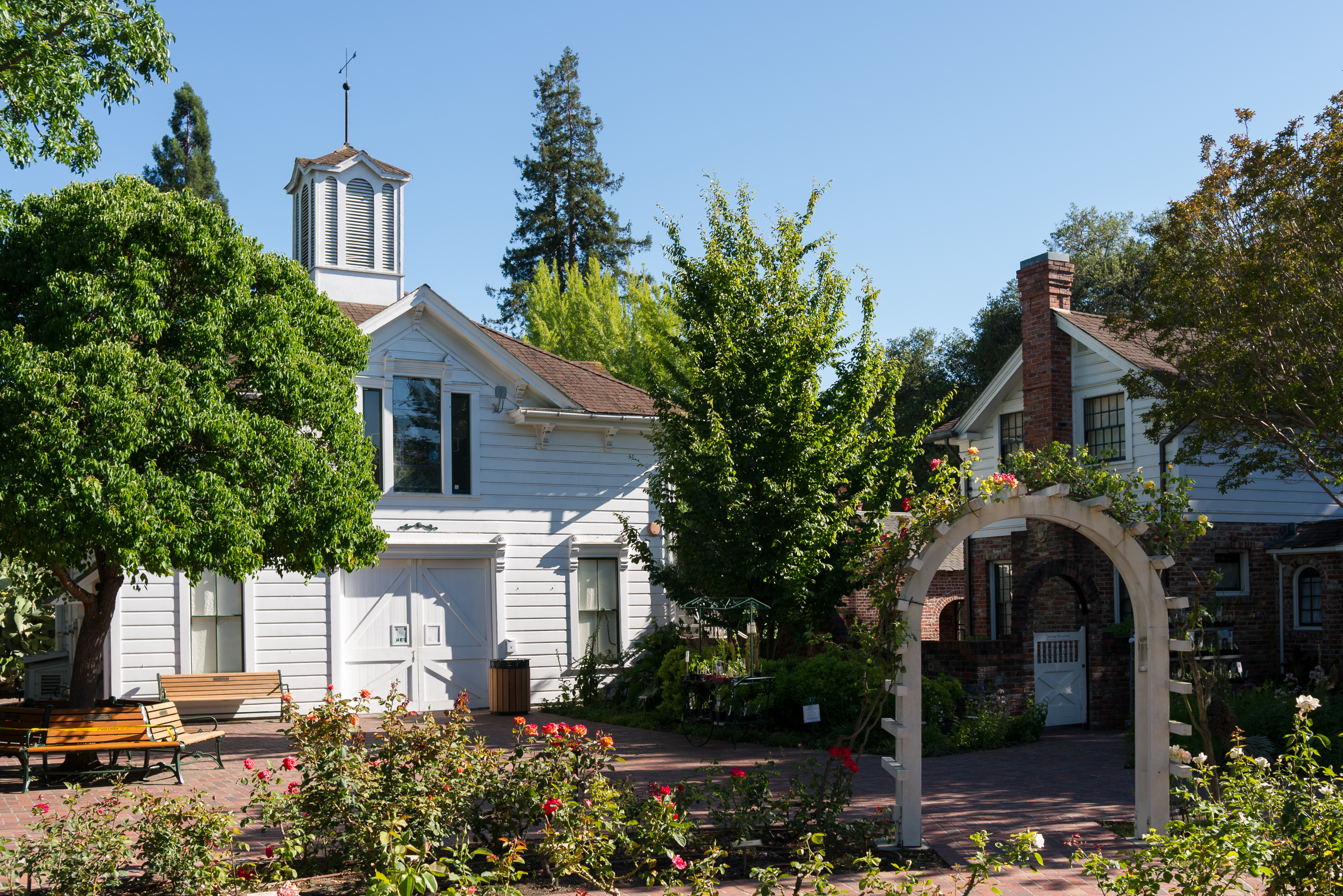
- Luther Burbank Home and Gardens

- Location within California Location within the United States
- Location: 200 Santa Rosa Ave., Santa Rosa, California
- Coordinates: 38°26′10″N 122°42′42″W
- Area: 0.5 acres (0.20 ha) (landmarked area)
- Built: 1875
- Architectural style: Greek Revival
- Website: lutherburbank.org
- NRHP reference No.: 66000241
- CHISL No.: 234

Significant dates
- Added to NRHP: October 15, 1966
- Designated NHL: June 19, 1964
- Designated CHISL: 1935

Luther Burbank Home and Gardens is a city park containing the former home, greenhouse, gardens, and grave of noted American horticulturist Luther Burbank (1849–1926). It is located at the intersection of Santa Rosa Avenue and Sonoma Avenue in Santa Rosa, California, in the United States. The park is open daily without charge; a fee is charged for guided tours. It is designated as a National Historic Landmark as well as a California Historical Landmark (#234).

== History ==
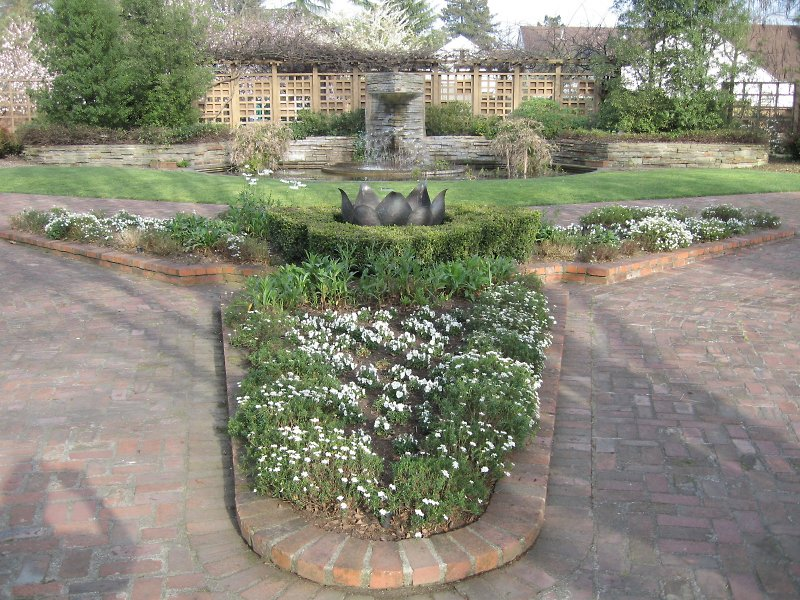
Luther Burbank Gardens in 2006

Burbank lived in Santa Rosa for more than 50 years, and performed the bulk of his life's work at this location. From 1884 to 1906 he lived in this park's Greek Revival house; he then moved across Tupper street to a house that no longer exists. After Burbank's death in 1926, his widow Elizabeth moved back to the house, where she remained until her death in 1977.

Burbank, a native of Massachusetts, was a nationally known figure who was responsible for creating many new varieties of plants. He is credited with introducing more than 250 new varieties of fruit, including a large number of plum varieties that are widely used in agriculture. A portion of the property was declared a National Historic Landmark in 1964. The site is included in the Santa Rosa historic landmarks and the Sonoma County Historical Society list of landmarks.

== Gardens ==
The gardens include many of Burbank's horticultural introductions, with collections of cactus, fruit trees, ornamental grasses, medicinal herbs, roses, and walnuts. Most plants are labeled with botanic and common names. The garden's greenhouse was designed and built by Burbank in 1889; Burbank's grave is nearby, underneath a Cedar of Lebanon.

== See also ==
- Gold Ridge Farm—Burbank's 18-acre (7.3 ha) experimental farm nearby in Sebastopol.
- Luther Burbank Rose Parade and Festival
- Botanical gardens in California
- List of botanical gardens in the United States
- List of botanical gardens and arboretums in California
- List of National Historic Landmarks in California
