= Stumptown, Indiana =

Unincorporated town in Indiana, United States

- Unincorporated town
- Vermillion County's location in Indiana

- Location in Vermillion County
- Country: United States
- State: Indiana
- County: Vermillion
- Township: Vermillion
- Time zone: UTC-5 (Eastern (EST))
  - Summer (DST): UTC-4 (EDT)

Stumptown is an unincorporated town in Vermillion Township, Vermillion County, in the U.S. state of Indiana. It is located about four miles north of Dana, along what is now Indiana State Road 71 on the way to Newport.

== Etymology ==
After the many white oak trees were cut down for lumber, barrels, and other uses, the area was covered with tree stumps, consequently acquiring its name.

== History ==
A one room schoolhouse was built in 1888 and later expanded, but burned down in 1906, and was replaced by one built with cement blocks. A post office named "Galatin" existed briefly, being established on August 7, 1900, and discontinued March 31, 1903. The name Galatin derived from the middle name of Albert Galatin Fortner (1837–1912). At its peak, Stumptown had two stores, a blacksmith shop, a school, and a United Brethren church. However, not long after the turn of the century the importance of the town diminished.
