= Matthew Southworth =

Matthew Southworth is a comic artist living in Seattle, Washington whose works frequently incorporate locations around the city. He's most well known for Stumptown, a modern noir series written by Greg Rucka and published by Oni Press. The series was turned into an ABC show on which Southworth served as Executive Producer.

Southworth's first published comics work was a short piece in Erik Larsen's Savage Dragon, followed by three issues of Infinity, Inc. Those issues, which he inked, also contained short backup pieces penciled by Southworth and inked by Stefano Gaudiano, who Southworth has occasionally assisted on projects like Daredevil and The Sensational Spider-Man. In June 2012, Southworth partnered with Southdown Creative to create a motion comic in support of the Xbox LIVE promotion, "Summer of Arcade 2012." He has also worked on Spider-Man: The Grim Hunt (Marvel Comics) and illustrated a Killer Croc story for DC Comics. Southworth has also worked as an inker on several projects, including Ares for Marvel Comics and Infinity, Inc. for DC Comics. Southworth is also a musician who was the lead vocalist and played guitar for The Capillaries.

In 2020 he published The Cloven, a graphic novel, with author Garth Stein.
