= Stumptown (comics) =

Comic book limited series

Publication information
- Publisher: Oni Press
- Schedule: Monthly
- Format: Limited series
- Genre: Crime, detective fiction
- Publication date: November 2009
- No. of issues: 19
- Main character: Dex Parios

Creative team
- Created by: Greg Rucka; Matthew Southworth
- Written by: Greg Rucka
- Artist(s): Matthew Southworth (vol 1-2); Justin Greenwood (vol 3-4)
- Letterer(s): Matthew Southworth (vol 1-2); Crank! (vol 3-4)
- Colorist(s): Lee Loughridge (vol 1); Rico Renzi (vol 2); Ryan Hill (vol 3-4)
- Editor(s): Jill Beaton; Randal Jarrell; James Lucas Jones

Stumptown is an American comic book limited series and later ongoing, written by Greg Rucka with art by Matthew Southworth. The first series launched by Oni Press on November 4, 2009, and ran for four issues. A second miniseries began in September 2012 and ran for five issues and a third volume, this time ongoing, began in September 2014.

The comic book is a modern-day detective fiction series based in Portland, Oregon, featuring Dex Parios, a bisexual female private investigator with a gambling problem.

== Plot ==
The first series begins in medias res with Dex's attempted murder and then showing the events leading up to this as she attempts to track down the granddaughter of a casino owner, who has promised to forgive Dex's heavy debt to the casino from her gambling losses in exchange for the girl's safe return.

== Influences ==
In an iFanboy podcast, Rucka says he was going to write his college thesis on the American Detective genre. He cites authors such as Dennis Lehane, Robert B. Parker, and Raymond Chandler as influences in the creation of his character, Dex Parios. He also credits television shows of his youth such as Magnum, P.I., Simon and Simon, and The Rockford Files.

== Reception ==
In less than one week, the first issue sold out at the distributor level. The first volume was nominated for the 2011 Eisner Award for Best Limited Series.

== Collected editions ==
Hard Covers
Title	Material collected	Publication date	ISBN
Stumptown - Volume One	Stumptown Vol. 1 #1–4	April 5, 2011	978-1934964378
Stumptown - Volume Two	Stumptown Vol. 2 #1-5	October 1, 2013	978-1934964897
Stumptown - Volume Three	Stumptown Vol. 3 #1-5	April 28, 2015	978-1620102015
Stumptown - Volume Four	Stumptown Vol. 3 #6-10	January, 2017	978-1-62010-301-2

== Adaptation ==
On January 29, 2019, it was announced that ABC had ordered a pilot based on the graphic novels. A month later on February 25, Cobie Smulders was cast in the lead role as Dex Parios. The series premiered on September 25, 2019. It was originally renewed by ABC for a second season, but after delays due to the COVID-19 pandemic, the network reversed their decision and cancelled the series.

== Bibliography ==
- Stumptown at the Grand Comics Database
- Stumptown at the Comic Book DB (archived from the original)
