= Steve Lieber =

American illustrator (born 1967)

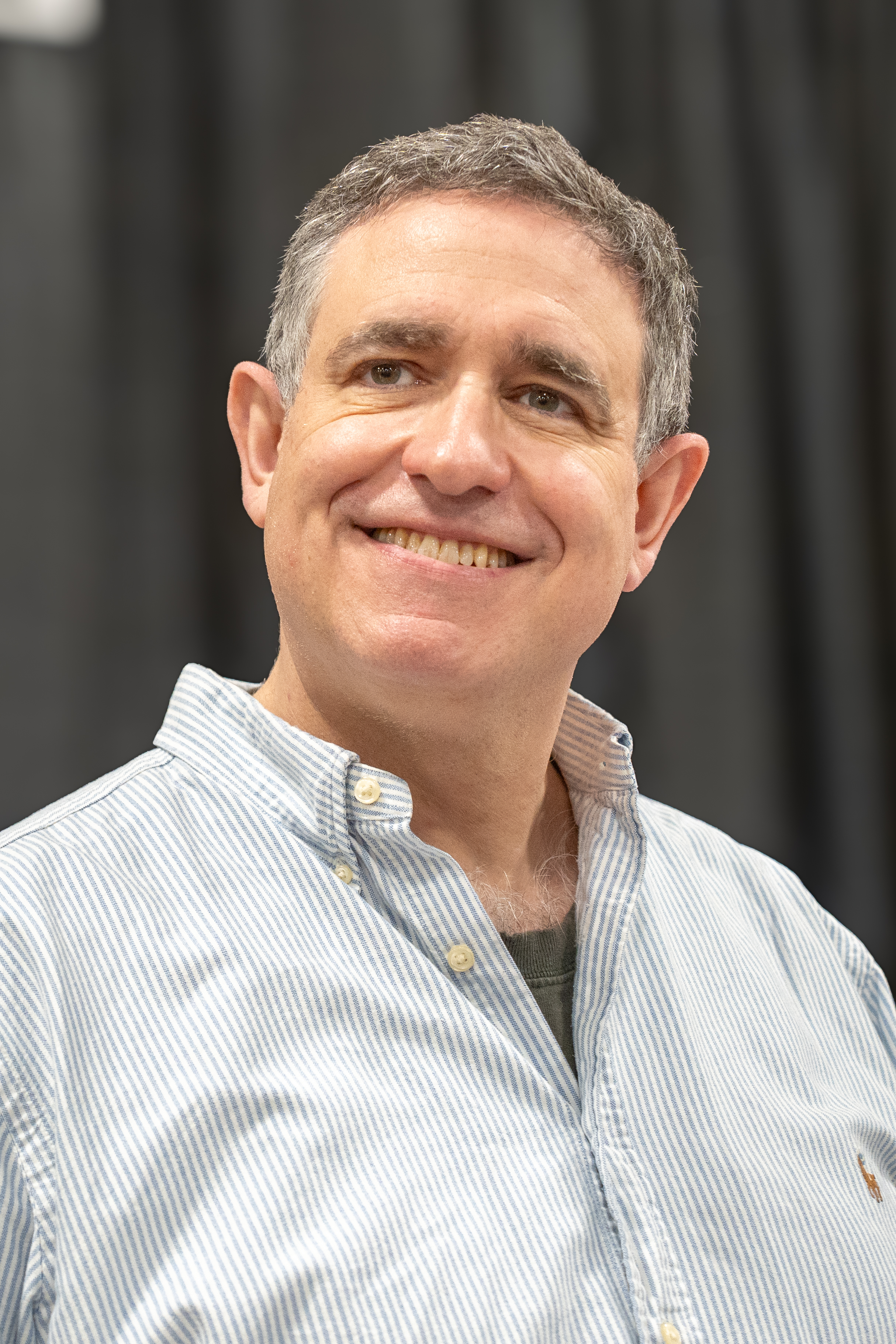
- Lieber at Comic Con Oakland 2026
- Born: May 19, 1967 (age 59) Pittsburgh, Pennsylvania, U.S.
- Areas: Writer, Artist
- Notable works: Whiteout; Whiteout: Melt
- Partner: Sara Ryan

Steve Lieber (born May 19, 1967) is an American comic book illustrator known for his work on books such as Detective Comics and Hawkman, and the critically acclaimed miniseries Whiteout, which was adapted into a 2009 feature film starring Kate Beckinsale. His other works include the Eisner Award-winning sequel Whiteout: Melt, and the thrillers Shooters and Underground. With writer Nat Gertler, he co-authored The Complete Idiot's Guide to Creating a Graphic Novel.

Lieber has described his career as being about "telling your own unified stories with finality."

== Early life ==
Lieber grew up in the Squirrel Hill section of Pittsburgh in the state of Pennsylvania. He graduated in 1985 from Allderdice High School, studied at Pennsylvania State University but left there before graduating to finish his artistic education at The Kubert School for cartoonists in New Jersey. He studied with Joe Kubert, whom he cites as a significant influence on his career and artistic sensibilities, and graduated in 1990.

Lieber also cites comic artists David Mazzucchelli, Alberto and Enrique Breccia, Milton Caniff, Alex Toth, Howard Chaykin, Alex Raymond, and Jaime Hernandez as major influences. Outside of comics, he cites other painters and illustrators as having influenced his artistic style: Hieronymus Bosch, Howard Pyle, N.C. Wyeth, Joseph Clement Coll, Norman Rockwell, Edgar Degas, Edward Hopper, The Ashcan School painters, Andrew Loomis, Robert Fawcett, and Charles Dana Gibson.

== Career ==
In 1993 Lieber drew Hawkman Annual #1. He subsequently drew 20 issues of the monthly Hawkman series from 1994 to 1995, beginning with issue #5 and ending with issue #27, and at one point, releasing a #0 (which happened between #13 and #14) as a stunt.

Lieber's Hawkman artwork brought him to the attention of Hollywood, where he began doing sketches for the show Batman. He said:

A big company that owns the characters offers a lot of visibility and the ability to play with extremely well-known icons ... Working for a big company, you have to be able to leave the character and ideas behind [after departing the project] in exactly the same place as when you came in.

— Steve Lieber, 2001

In 1998 Lieber illustrated the four-issue miniseries Whiteout with writer Greg Rucka for Oni Press. The critically acclaimed series, which was described as a "blood-in-the-snow serial killer story", was collected into a trade paperback, and adapted into a 2009 feature film starring Kate Beckinsale and Tom Skerritt.

Lieber attributes his success to persistence, and described himself coming out of school as "averagely skilled", but that he "stayed working in comics longer than some of my contemporaries because I didn't want to do anything else." In addition, Lieber exchanged information and tips from comics creators such as Dwayne McDuffie. Lieber's graphic novel Underground, a story about a park ranger trapped in a cavern, was described as a "spelunking thriller" by Time magazine.

Lieber has been a guest at comic book conventions such as the 2007 San Diego Comic-Con.

In February 2008, Lieber drew a series of illustrations in which characters from the TV show The Wire were rendered in the style of the TV show The Simpsons, one of which was named by Alan Sepinwall of The Star-Ledger and NJ.com as the "coolest link of the day".

Beginning in September 2009 Lieber illustrated the five-issue miniseries Underground with writer Jeff Parker for Image Comics. The series, about a spelunking park ranger trapped in a cave, was later collected into trade paperback from in early May 2010.

In April 2012 DC/Vertigo published writers Brandon Jerwa and Eric Stephen Trautmann's military thriller graphic novel, Shooters, which was illustrated by Lieber.

In July 2013 Lieber began drawing Superior Foes of Spider-Man for Marvel Comics. The series follows a team of hapless, lesser-known villains from the Spider-Man universe. Lieber has received extensive praise for his work on the series, including a nod on ComicsAlliance's "Best of 2013" list. ComicsAlliance reviewer Dylan Todd says "Lieber’s at the top of his game here, with a mixture of traditional cape comics styling and a more humane point-of-view that reminds you that these are really just people in suits doing dumb, dangerous things and that they can get hurt at any moment."

== Personal life ==
Lieber and his wife, novelist Sara Ryan, live in Portland, Oregon, where he is a member of Helioscope Studio.

== Bibliography ==
=== As writer and illustrator ===
- "The Killing Floor" in Vampirella Comics Magazine #1, Harris Publications, 2003
- "Fell" in Four Letter Worlds 2005

=== As illustrator ===
- Conan the Usurper #1-3 (of 3) (writer: Chuck Dixon; additional art: Klaus Janson), Marvel Comics, 1997
- Grendel Tales: The Devil's Apprentice #1-3 (of 3) (writer: Jeffrey Lang) (Dark Horse Comics), 1997
- Whiteout (writer: Greg Rucka), 1999
- "The Mermaid's Necklace" (adapted from the story by Ruth Plumly Thompson; adaptation, Eric Shanower) p. 154-159 in Oz-Story, no. 6, Hungry Tiger Press, Sept. 2000
- Whiteout: Melt (writer: Greg Rucka), 2000
  - Winner of the 2000 Eisner Award for Best Limited Series
- Detective Comics #767 "Timeless" (writer: Greg Rucka), DC Comics, 2002
  - Collected in Batman: Bruce Wayne: Murderer? (writers: Ed Brubaker, Greg Rucka, Devin Grayson, Chuck Dixon, Kelley Puckett), 2002
- Me and Edith Head (writer: Sara Ryan) in Cricket v.4 no. 1 (Carus Publishing), 2002
  - Nominated for 2002 Eisner Award for Best Short Story
  - reprinted as a standalone, self-published volume, 2002
- Family Reunion (writer: Sean Stewart), 2004
- On the Road to Perdition, two issues:
  - #2 of 3 "Sanctuary" (writer: Max Allan Collins), 2003
  - #3 of 3 "Detour" (writer: Max Allan Collins, penciller: José Luis García-López), 2004
  - Collected in Road to Perdition 2: On the Road (ISBN 1-4012-0357-4, DC Comics), 2004
- Flytrap - Episode One: Juggling Act (writer: Sara Ryan), 2005
- Gotham Central #37 (writer: Greg Rucka), 2005
- Civil War: Frontline #1-10 (writer: Paul Jenkins, additional art: Ramon Bachs), 2006–2007
- Thunderbolts: Desperate Measures #1 (writer: Paul Jenkins, color: June Chung), 2007
- Underground (writer: Jeff Parker, color: Ron Chan, 5-issue limited series, Image Comics, 2009–2010, tpb, 128 pages, 2010, ISBN 1-60706-266-6)
- Alabaster Wolves #1-5 (writer: Caitlín R. Kiernan), 2012
- Quantum and Woody Must Die! #1-4 (writer: James Asmus), 2015
- Lazarus X+66 #1 (writer: Greg Rucka), 2017
- Superior Foes of Spider-man #1-6, 8,9, 12-17 (writer: Nick Spencer), Marvel Comics, 2013
- The Fix #1-12 (writer: Nick Spencer) Image Comics, 2017
- Superman's Pal Jimmy Olsen (writer: Matt Fraction) DC Comics, 2020
- One-Star Squadron (writer: Mark Russell) DC Comics 2022

=== As a contributing illustrator ===
- Twilight Zone #7 and 11, NOW Comics (1992)
- "An Edwardian Nursery" (writer: Jeffrey Lang) in Dark Horse Presents #77, 1993
- G.I. Joe: A Real American Hero #141 "Sucker Punch" (writer: Larry Hama; additional art: various), Marvel Comics, 1993
- Hawkeye #7 (writer: Matt Fraction; additional art: Jesse Alan Hamm), Marvel Comics, 2013
- Hawkman Annual 01 "Bad Blood", (writer: John Ostrander; additional art: various), DC Comics, 1993
- Hawkman #0 "Eyes of the Hawk, Prologue: Old Scores", (Writer: William Messner-Loebs, inker: Curt Shoultz; colorist: Buzz Setzer; letterer: Albert T. DeGuzman), DC Comics, 1994
- Hawkman #5 "A Rage of Hawks", (writer: John Ostrander; inker: Rick Magyar; colorists: Matt Webb; letterer: Albert T. DeGuzman) DC Comics, 1994
- Hawkman #6 "War Cry", (writer: John Ostrander; inker: Rick Magyar; colorists: Buzz Setzer; letterer: Albert T. DeGuzman) DC Comics, 1994
- Hawkman #9-13 "Godspawn", (writers: William Messner-Loebs & Steven T. Seagle; additional art: various), DC Comics, 1994
- Hawkman #14-17 "Eyes of the Hawk", (writer: William Messner-Loebs; inker: Curt Shoultz; colorists: Buzz Setzer; letterer: Albert T. DeGuzman), DC Comics, 1994–1995
- "Legacy" in Marvel Comics Presents #147 (writer: Mariano Nicieza; colorist: Marianne Lightle; letterer: Loretta Krol), Marvel Comics, 1994
- Medal of Honor #2 (writer: Doug Murray; various artists), Dark Horse, 1994
- "Roadways" (writer: Jeffrey Lang; inked by Steve Lieber; additional artists: Ted Slampyak, John Drury, Tommy Berg; edited by Katherine Fritz), Cult Press, 1994.
- "Sgt. Desmond Doss: The Bible Tells Me So" (writer: Doug Murray) in Medal of Honor Special, Dark Horse Comics, 1994
- "Sir John's Passing" (writer: Jeffrey Lang) in Dark Horse Presents #88, 1994
- Detective Comics #685-686 "War of the Dragons" (writer: Chuck Dixon; inker: Klaus Janson; colorist: John Wellington; letterer: John Costanza), DC Comics, 1995
- Hawkman #19 "Madness in Motown", (writer: William Messner-Loebs; inker: Curt Shoultz; colorists: Buzz Setzer)DC Comics, 1995
- Hawkman #20 "Clash of Wings", (writer: William Messner-Loebs; inker: Curt Shoultz; colorists: Buzz Setzer), DC Comics, 1995
- Hawkman #22 "Storm Over Thanagar: The Way of the Warrior Part 3", (writer: William Messner-Loebs; inker: Curt Shoultz; letterer: Bob Pinaha), DC Comics, 1995
- Hawkman #23 "Essential Warfare: The Way of the Warrior Part 6", (writer: William Messner-Loebs; inker: Curt Shoultz; colorist: Trish Mulvihill, letterer: Bob Pinaha), DC Comics, 1995
- Hawkman #24-25 "Hunting the Lion", (writer: William Messner-Loebs; inker: Curt Shoultz; letterer: Bob Pinaha), DC Comics, 1995
- Hawkman #26 "Fear Visits", (writer: William Messner-Loebs; inker: Curt Shoultz; letterer: Bob Pinaha), DC Comics, 1995
- Hawkman #27 "Hawkmad!", (writer: William Messner-Loebs; letterer: Bob Pinaha), DC Comics, 1995
- Robin #17 "The Silk Dragons" (writer: Chuck Dixon; additional art: (Enrique Villagran, John Wellington, Tim Harkins), DC Comics, 1995
- Species #2 (of 4) (writer: Dennis Feldman; additional artists: various), (Dark Horse), 1995
- The Big Book of Hoaxes (writers: Various), 1996
- The Big Book of Thugs (writer: Joel Rose), 1996
- Neil Gaiman's Lady Justice #8-11 (writer: C.J. Henderson; colorists: Heroic Age & David Hillman; letterer: Ken Bruzenak), Tekno Comics, 1996
- The Big Book of Losers (writers: Paul Kirchner, Nancy A. Collins, Irwin Chusid), 1997
- The Big Book of Martyrs (writer: John Wagner), 1997
- The Big Book of Scandal (writer: Jonathan Vankin), 1997
- The Big Book of the Unexplained (writer: Doug Moench), 1997
- "A brother to dragons" in Margaret Weis' Testament of the Dragon : an Illustrated Novel (writer: Margaret Weis) (HarperPrism, ISBN 0-06-105543-3), 1997
- "Heavy Water" in Two-fisted Science (writer: Jim Ottaviani) (General Tektronics Labs, ISBN 0-9660106-0-4), 1997
  - Second edition G.T. Labs, ISBN 0-9660106-2-0, 2001
- The Big Book of the Weird Wild West (writers: John Whalen, Deb Picker, Richard Klaw, Ben Ostrander), 1998
- "A Great Metropolitan Newspaper" in Superman Secret Files & Origins (writer: Roger Stern; additional art: Joes Marzan Jr., Tom McCraw), DC Comics, 1998
- Heroes Reborn: Rebel #1 "Wild Blue" (writer: Joe Kelly, additional art: various), Marvel Comics, 2000
- pinup in Finder: Sin-Eater, Part 2 by Carla Speed McNeil, Lightspeed Press, 2000, ISBN 0-9673691-1-8
- Batman: Turning Points #1 (writer: Greg Rucka, pencil & ink: Steve Lieber, letters, colors and edits: Willie Schubert, Tom McCraw, Matt Idleson), DC Comics, 2001
- Detective Comics #758 "Unknowing - Part 1" (writers: Ed Brubaker & Greg Rucka; additional art: Shawn Martinbrough), DC Comics, 2001
- "Death" in Fallout: J. Robert Oppenheimer, Leo Szilard, and the Political Science of the Atomic Bomb (writer: Jim Ottaviani), 2001
- Harley Quinn: Our Worlds at War #1 "Our Fighting Forces" (writer: Karl Kesel; additional art: various), DC Comics, 2001
- Pantheon #8-9 (writer: Bill Willingham; additional art: various), Lone Star Press, 2001
- Superman #174 "Every Blade of Grass" (writer: Jeph Loeb; additional artists: Tanya Horie, Richard Horie), DC Comics, 2001
- Swamp Thing #9 "In the Air, on Land and Sea..." (writer: Brian K. Vaughan, additional art: various), Vertigo (DC Comics), 2001
- Transmetropolitan: Filth of the City (writer: Warren Ellis), 2001
- "The Wake" (writer: Jeffrey Lang) in Star Trek: Special, (Wildstorm) 2001
- Xeno's Arrow #2, 2001
- "The Glittering World" (writer: David Fury); colorist: Matt Hollingsworth) in Buffy the Vampire Slayer: Tales of the Slayers, Dark Horse Comics, 2001
- Detective Comics #768-770 "Purity" and #771 "Access" (writer: Greg Rucka; additional art: various), DC Comics, 2002
  - Collected in Batman: Bruce Wayne: Fugitive Volume 2, DC Comics, 2003
- Detective Comics #773-774 "Atonement" (writer: Greg Rucka; inker: Mark McKenna; colorist: Jason Wright; letterer: Todd Klein), DC Comics, 2002
  - Collected in Batman: Bruce Wayne: Fugitive Volume 3, DC Comics, 2003
- Batman: Family #7-8 (writer: John Francis Moore; additional art: various), DC Comics, 2003
- The Interman 1 (writer: Jeff Parker), 2003
- "Family Story" (writer: Sara Ryan, colorist: Jeff Parker) in Hellboy: Weird Tales #3, 2003
  - Collected in Hellboy: Weird Tales 1 (ISBN 1-56971-622-6, Dark Horse), 2003
- "Prison Break" (writer: Kevin McCarthy; colorist: Jeff Parker) in The Amazing Adventures of the Escapist 1, Dark Horse Comics, 2004
- cover art for Lady Churchill's Rosebud Wristlet, no. 15, (ed. by Gavin Grant and Kelly Link), (Small Beer Press), 2005
- Gotham Central #32 "Nature" (writer: Greg Rucka; colorist: Lee Loughridge; letterer: Clem Robins), DC Comics, 2005
- ""Thoughts on a Winter Morning"" in Negative Burn: Winter 2005 (writer: Kurt Busiek), Desperado Publishing (Image Comics) 2005
- pinup in The Surrogates #3 "Revelations" (writer: Robert Venditti; additional art: various), Top Shelf Productions, 2005
- Gotham Central #37 "Sunday Bloody Sunday" (writer: Greg Rucka; colorist: Lee Loughridge; letterer: Clem Robins), DC Comics, 2006
- METHo.d. (writer: Clifford Meth; various artists) Aardwolf Publishing, 2006
- Bat Lash #6 #32 "Nature" (writer: Sergio Aragones), DC Comics, 2008
- Hawkeye #7 (writer:Matt Fraction) Marvel Comics 2011
- Teen Titans Academy #4, 5 (writer: Tim Sheridan) DC Comics 2021

=== As co-author ===
- The Complete Idiot's Guide to Creating a Graphic Novel, with Nat Gertler, Alpha Books ISBN 1-59257-233-2, 2004

=== As interviewer ===
- "Another Survivors' Tale : The Harvey Pekar Interview". Interview conducted by Jim Ottaviani and Steve Lieber. p. 117-125 in Hogan's Alley, v. 1, no. 4, 1997
- "The Authoritative Frank Stack, or, Foolbert Sturgeon on Jesus, Crumb, and Cancer". Interview conducted by Jim Ottaviani and Steve Lieber. p. 92-110 in The Comics Journal, no. 189, Aug. 1996
