= Whiteout: Melt =

2000 comic book limited series

Publication information
- Publisher: Oni Press
- Schedule: Monthly
- Format: Limited series
- Genre: Crime
- Publication date: September 1999 – February 2000
- No. of issues: 4
- Main character: Carrie Stetko

Creative team
- Created by: Greg Rucka; Steve Lieber
- Written by: Greg Rucka
- Artist: Steve Lieber
- Letterer: Steve Lieber
- Editor: Jamie S. Rich

Collected editions
- Definitive edition: ISBN 978-1-932664-71-3

Whiteout: Melt is the title of a comic book limited series written by Greg Rucka, illustrated by Steve Lieber, and published by Oni Press in 2000. It is the sequel to Whiteout.

Like Whiteout, the illustrations are all in black and white, capturing the starkness of the Antarctic landscape.

== Publication history ==
A third volume in the series, Whiteout: Thaw was expected to be released as four separate issues beginning in the Fall of 2007, however the series was not issued in 2007 or 2008. Rucka subsequently indicated that Thaw was expected to be released around the same time as the film version of Whiteout in September 2009, but it has not yet been published.

== Plot ==
US Marshal Carrie Stetko is pulled from vacation by agents of the US government. They inform her that an explosion has occurred at an Antarctic Russian research station long suspected of building weapons for the Russian government. They ask her to investigate and offer her a ticket back to the States if she succeeds.

Stetko arrives at the station, where she finds among the corpses that one has been shot. Her suspicions piqued, she investigates the ruins, only to fall through a loose floorboard into the confirmed weapons cache. She also discovers crates that once contained nuclear weapons that have been stolen. She then meets GRU agent Aleks Kuchin, who informs her that the culprits are Spetsnaz agents hired by the Russian government to steal the weapons. After alerting her contacts, Stetko is ordered to work with Kuchin to find the weapons and deliver them to America by any means necessary.

After being provided thermal imaging of the group's trail, Stetko and Kuchin set out in pursuit. They find the vehicle of one of the men who fell into a crevasse, then the body when they fall in while avoiding a booby trap. After escaping, they continue on and find another body. Before they can keep going, a massive storm hits and they're forced to take shelter. That night, they give in to rising passions and have sex.

The next day, Stetko finds that Kuchin has left her behind. He finds the Spetsnaz, who are hopelessly lost, but manage to take him captive. Stetko arrives and in the ensuing fight, they manage to kill the remaining men. Stetko almost kills Kuchin, but ultimately decides to leave him and the nukes, planning to claim he abandoned her in the crevasse.

== Collected editions ==
The series are collected as trade paperbacks:

- Whiteout Volume 2: Melt (120 pages, 2000, ISBN 978-1-929998-03-6; Definitive edition, June 2007 ISBN 978-1-932664-71-3)

In 2001 both series were collected into a limited edition hardcover, Total Whiteout (ISBN 0936211601).

== Awards ==
It won the 2000 Eisner Award for Best Limited Series.
