= Zander Cannon =

American cartoonist

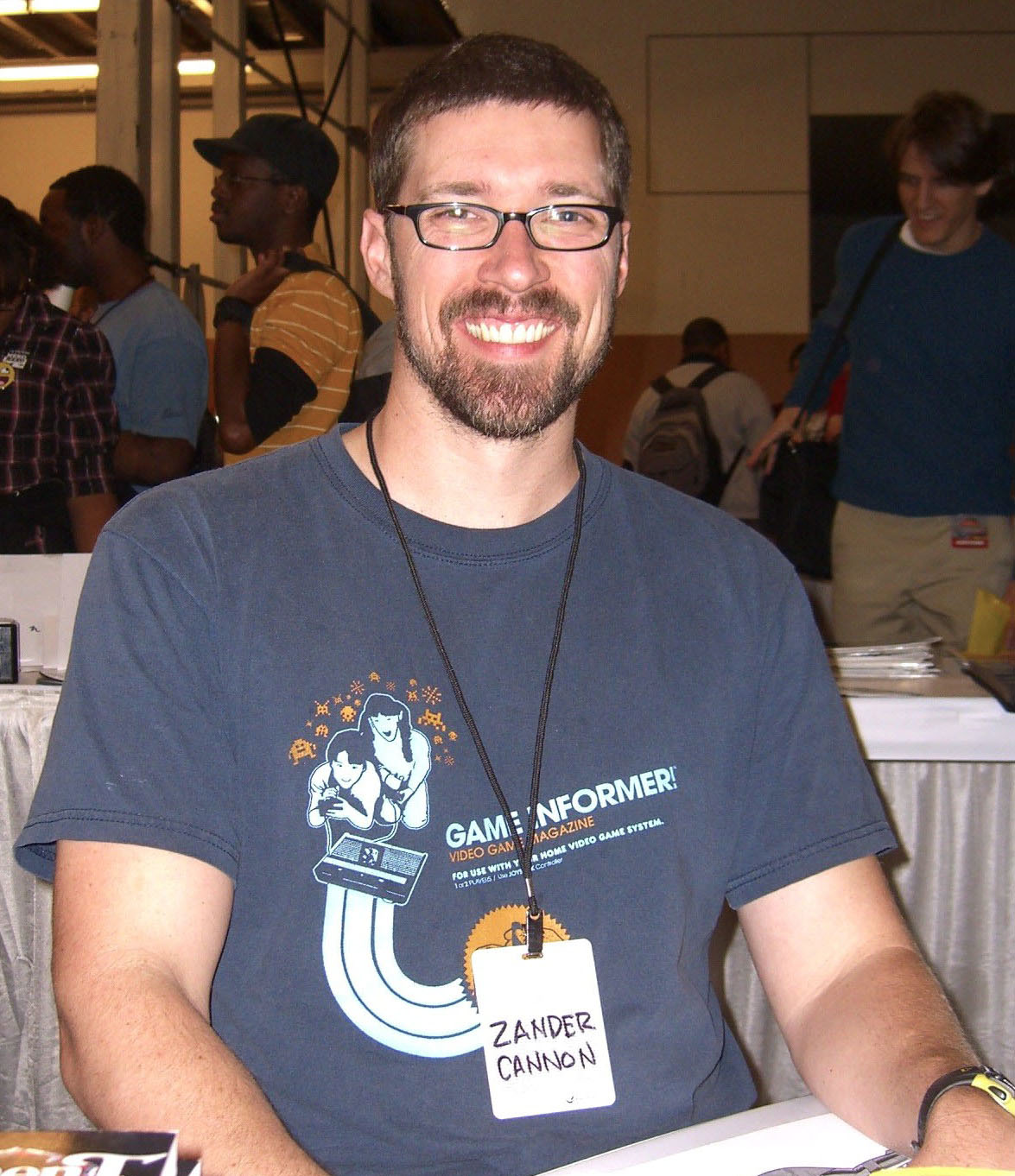
- Cannon at the New York Comic Con in Manhattan, New York on October 9, 2010.
- Born: Alexander Cannon; November 1, 1972 (age 54) Boston, Massachusetts, U.S.
- Area: Cartoonist
- Notable works: Top 10; Smax

Alexander Cannon (born November 1, 1972) is an American cartoonist, known for his work on books such as Top 10, Smax and Kaijumax.

== Career ==
Cannon's first professional comics work was The Chainsaw Vigilante, a spin-off from The Tick, from New England Comics. Beginning in the mid-1990s, he wrote and drew The Replacement God, a fantasy comic book about a former slave named Knute who is pursued across the fictional land of Mun by a tyrannical king and his beatnik Visigoth Death Horde. The first eight issues were published by Slave Labor Graphics, a subsequent five issues were published by Image Comics, and one issue was self-published by Cannon under his Handicraft Guild imprint.

Cannon worked as layout artist on Top 10, with writer Alan Moore and finishing artist Gene Ha, and pencilled its spin-off miniseries Smax, with Moore and inker Andrew Currie, for America's Best Comics. Cannon won a joint Eisner for Best Continuing Series in 2001 for his work on Top 10.

In August 2004 Cannon co-founded Big Time Attic with former co-publisher Shadi Petosky and fellow Grinnell College alumnus Kevin Cannon. With Big Time Attic, he has illustrated a book with Jim Ottaviani entitled Bone Sharps, Cowboys, and Thunder Lizards. Petosky then spun off BTA's multimedia studio Puny Entertainment (founded in 2007) to be an independent company, leaving BTA as the commercial partnership of the two Cannons.

Zander and Kevin Cannon have worked together on many comics & illustration projects, including several nonfiction graphic novels. In 2012 they launched the digital comics magazine Double Barrel, in which Zander Cannon is serializing the graphic novel Heck, his first long-form solo comics project since The Replacement God. Top Shelf Productions collected Heck into graphic novel format in 2013. "Heck" was nominated for an Eisner for "Best Graphic Album—Reprint" in 2014 but did not win.

Cannon has been developing the Kaijumax series since 2015 as writer and artist. Kaijumax tells the story of a kaiju (monster in Japanese) jail.

In 2025, he started the 8-issue horror series Sleep for Image Comics.

== Bibliography ==
- Chainsaw Vigilante (New England Comics, 1993–1994)
- The Replacement God (Amaze Ink/SLG, 1995-1997)
- The Replacement God and Other Stories (Image/Handicraft Guild, 1997-1998)
- Top 10 (with Alan Moore and Gene Ha, America's Best Comics/Wildstorm, 1999-2001)
- Smax (with Alan Moore et al.), America's Best Comics/Wildstorm, 2003-2004)
- Bone Sharps, Cowboys, and Thunder Lizards (with Jim Ottaviani and Big Time Attic), G.T. Labs, 2005, ISBN 978-0-9660106-6-4)
- Top 10: Season Two (with Kevin Cannon and Gene Ha, America's Best Comics/Wildstorm, 2008-2009)
- The Stuff of Life: A Graphic Guide to Genetics and DNA (with Mark Schultz and Kevin Cannon, Hill & Wang, 2009)
- T-Minus: The Race to The Moon (with Jim Ottaviani and Kevin Cannon, Aladdin, 2009)
- Evolution: The Story of Life on Earth (with Jay Hosler and Kevin Cannon, Hill & Wang, 2011)
- Double Barrel (with Kevin Cannon, Top Shelf Productions, 2012-)
- Heck (Top Shelf Productions, 2013)
- Kaijumax (Oni Press, 2015)
- Kaijumax Season 2 (Oni Press, 2016)
- Kaijumax Season 3 (Oni Press, 2017)
- Kaijumax Season 4 (Oni Press, 2018)
- Kaijumax Season 5 (Oni Press, 2019)
- Kaijumax Season 6 (Oni Press, 2022)
- Sleep (Image Comics, 2025)
