= Whiteout (comic book) =

1998 comic book series by Greg Rucka

Publication information
- Publisher: Oni Press
- Schedule: Monthly
- Format: Limited series
- Genre: Crime
- Publication date: July – November 1998
- No. of issues: 4
- Main character: Carrie Stetko

Creative team
- Created by: Greg Rucka; Steve Lieber
- Written by: Greg Rucka
- Artist: Steve Lieber
- Letterer: Steve Lieber
- Editor(s): Jamie S. Rich; Bob Schreck

Collected editions
- Definitive edition: ISBN 978-1-932664-70-6

Whiteout is a comic book limited series by writer Greg Rucka and artist Steve Lieber. It was originally released in four issues during 1998, by Oni Press and then collected into a trade paperback.

A film adaptation of the series was released in 2009.

== Plot ==
US Marshal Carrie Stetko is disgraced after murdering a criminal in a blind rage. As punishment, she's sent to McMurdo Station in Antarctica where she establishes herself as someone not to be messed with.

Sometime after Stetko's arrival, a body is found on the ice surrounded by mysterious holes in the snow. Since the face is destroyed, he's identified through prints as Alex Keller, a member of a scientific expedition. Stetko investigates the other members of Keller's expedition, starting at Victoria Station. After meeting British agent Lilly Sharpe, the two find the two members stationed at the base murdered and the killer attacks, knocking out Sharpe and chasing Stetko outside. During her escape, Stetko gets frostbite from touching a door handle without a glove and nearly dies of hypothermia before Sharpe saves her.

Back at McMurdo, Stetko's hand is treated by Dr. Furry, who is forced to amputate two of her fingers. Despite the setback, Stetko, now aided by Sharpe, learns that two more members are at the South Pole station. While Sharpe finds them dead as well, Stetko finds a surprisingly alive Keller. He flees, but is found inside the plane that brought Stetko and Sharpe, along with several bars of gold.

After Sharpe stops Keller from killing Stetko, the two bring him back to McMurdo, where they realize the first victim is actually another member of the team, Weiss, and the murders were performed to keep the gold found in the snow, hence the holes. Sharpe sees Furry speaking with pilot Haden and becomes suspicious of the two, since Keller would need a pilot to help move the gold. When Furry realizes her suspicions, Haden tries to kill her, but flees when she wounds him. Afraid the incident will lead to him, Furry tries to help Haden leave. When Haden, convinced Furry is trying to cut him out, attacks him, Furry kills him.

After treating Sharpe, Stetko forces Keller to admit Furry's involvement. Having realized Furry must have falsified the first victim's prints, Stetko and Sharpe check one of the bodies and find it full of gold bars. Stetko then arrests Furry and prepares to face the cold winter months.

== Publication history ==
The series was followed by a sequel, Whiteout: Melt. Stetko is sent back to Antarctica by the government, as she is familiar with the territory and there had been a mass murder. It turns out Russian mercenaries are on a rampage. Stetko and a rogue Russian intelligence officer must save the day.

A third volume in the series, originally advertised as Whiteout: Thaw, was expected to be released as four separate issues beginning in the Fall of 2007. In December 2008, Rucka announced in a forum post that the title was changed to Whiteout: Night and the publication of the series would probably start in the Fall 2009.

The book once crossed over with Barry Ween, in a 6-page story done for the Oni Press Summer Vacation Supercolor Fun Special. The story, titled Weenout: The Carrie-Ween Crossover, was co-written by Rucka and Ween creator Judd Winick, illustrated by Winick and colored by Guy Major. Additionally, Lieber drew a B&W "pin-up" of Carrie & Barry for the Special, where Barry has built Carrie a robotic hand (complete with death ray) to replace her three-fingered right hand.

== Collected editions ==
The series are collected as trade paperbacks:

- Whiteout Volume 1 (128 pages, 2001, ISBN 978-0-9667127-1-1; Definitive edition, July 2007, ISBN 978-1-932664-70-6)
- Whiteout: Melt (120 pages, 2000, ISBN 978-1-929998-03-6; Definitive edition, June 2007 ISBN 978-1-932664-71-3)

In 2001 both series were collected into a limited edition hardcover, Total Whiteout (ISBN 978-0936211602).

== Awards ==
In 1999 Whiteout was nominated for the "Best Writer", "Best Penciller/Inker or Penciller/Inker Team" and "Best Limited Series" Eisner Awards and in 2000 it was nominated for the "Best Graphic Album" Eisner Award.

The Carrie Stetko character was ranked 44th in Comics Buyer's Guide's "100 Sexiest Women in Comics" list.

== Film adaptation ==
A critically and commercially panned film based on the comic book was released in 2009. It was directed by Dominic Sena, and stars Kate Beckinsale and Gabriel Macht in the lead roles.
