= Leland Purvis =

Comics creator

Leland Purvis is a comic book writer and artist, best known for his black and white series Vóx and Pubo.

== Awards ==
Purvis was nominated for the 2004 Ignatz Award for Promising New Talent for his work on Suspended in Language. He was also the recipient of a 2000 Xeric Foundation grant to support the creation of Vóx.

== Bibliography ==
=== As writer and artist ===
- Vóx #1-4 (of 4), Pack Rabbit Press, 2000-2003
  - collected in Vox : collected works, 1999-2003, Absence of Ink Comics, 2004
- Pubo #1-3 (of 3), Dark Horse Comics, 2002-2003
  - collected in Pubo, Dark Horse Comics, 2003
- Vulcan & Vishnu, a web-comic

=== As primary artist ===
- Suspended in language : Niels Bohr's life, discoveries, and the century he shaped (writer: Jim Ottaviani), G. T. Labs, 2004
- Shellgame (story, photography, and design by Marc Calvary; art by Leland Purvis), The Carbon Based Mistake
- Resistance: Book One, (writer: Carla Jablonski), First Second Books (2010)
- The Imitation Game (writer: Jim Ottaviani), Tor.com, 2014

=== As contributor ===
- The Monon Street Power Collective 1, (Various artists and writers), Welsh El Dorado Press, 2004
- 24seven, (various artists and writers), Image Comics, 2006
- "The First Move" (writer: Elizabeth Genco) in Smut Peddler #3, Saucy Goose Press, 2006
