= Dinosaur Wars (film) =

- Genre: Documentary
- Written by: Mark Davis
- Directed by: Mark Davis
- Theme music composer: Tom Phillips
- Country of origin: United States
- Original language: English

Production
- Producers: Mark Davis and Anna Saraceno
- Cinematography: Brian Dowley
- Editors: Doug Quade and David Espar
- Running time: 52 minutes

Original release
- Network: PBS
- Release: January 17, 2011

Dinosaur Wars is a documentary film created by PBS as an episode for American Experience. The video details the rivalry between Edward Cope and O. C. Marsh. Cope and Marsh were paleontologists who uncovered dinosaur fossils in the late 19th century. PBS broadcast the episode on January 17, 2011. PBS later posted the video online in July 2011. The episode has been covered in online articles posted by Technorati and Wired.
