= Missouri Boy =

2006 autobiographical graphic novel by Leland Myrick

Publication information
- Publisher: First Second Books
- Publication date: September 2006

Creative team
- Created by: Leland Myrick
- Colorist: Hilary Sycamore

Missouri Boy is an autobiographical graphic novel written and illustrated by Leland Myrick. The book was published in September 2006 by First Second Books.

== Plot ==
=== Prologue ===
Missouri Boy is divided into ten chapters, detailing various events in Myrick's early life growing up in Missouri. The book opens with a prologue set in 1961, titled "Ghost Umbilical", in which Myrick and his twin brother are born. Myrick's grandmother dies on the same day.

=== Chapters 1–3 ===
Chapter one is set in 1967, and is titled "Paper Airplanes". Myrick's father gives him and his twin brother paper to use to make paper airplanes. The brothers make the airplanes and go outside to throw them in the wind. Chapter two is set in 1969, and is titled "Old Man's Chair". The chapter consists of two pages, and shows Myrick's father receiving a large chair. Myrick remarks to his father "That's an old man's chair", to which his father responds "Yes it is. Thank God for that." Chapter three takes place in 1970, and is titled "Firecracker Tree". Myrick's father brings him and his twin brother to a fireworks shop. They buy some fireworks, and return home to wait until it is dark. At night the family (including Myrick's two older brothers) assembles around a tree to set off the fireworks. One of the older brothers asks their father if he can "bum a cig", before the fireworks are set off. The following morning Myrick and his twin brother return to the tree. The grass immediately surrounding the tree has been completely burned away.

=== Chapters 4–6 ===
Chapter four is set in 1972 and is titled "My Father's Hands". The family goes to court where Myrick's oldest brother is sentenced to ten years in prison for robbery. After the sentencing, the family visits the brother one last time, and he shakes hands with Myrick's father. Chapter five is set in 1973 and is titled "Underwear Pond". Myrick and some friends go skinny-dipping in a pond. They throw their underwear into the sky, and let it sink to the bottom of the pond. Myrick imagines the pond being drained years in the future, and underwear being found. Chapter six takes place in 1976 and is titled "The Resurrection". Myrick's brother and friends bury him in a pile of leaves. Myrick initially believes it to be a game, but when he emerges, they are urinating on him. Myrick vows to "never go back to them".

=== Chapters 7–10 ===
Chapter seven takes place in 1978 and is titled "Hanging". Myrick and some friends hang off the edge of a five-story parking garage in order to impress some girls. Chapter eight takes place in 1981 and is titled "His Blood". Myrick works in a hospital and watches on as doctors try save a patient, during which blood gets onto him. The patient dies, and afterward Myrick helps a doctor x-ray the body. When Myrick turns the body over, blood spills onto him again. Chapter nine takes place in 1982 and is titled "Candy Striper". Myrick is still working in a hospital, and he begins to notice a girl that also works there. Myrick begins to talk to her, but halfway through suddenly loses confidence. Later one of the girl's friends brings her back to Myrick and asks "Do you want to go out with her?", to which Myrick responds "No". Chapter ten takes place in 1985 and is titled "Out of the Country". Myrick leaves Missouri to be with a girl he met at a university in California. Scenes of his childhood are shown while he rides his motorcycle. The book ends when Myrick reaches a beach and finds the girl.

== Production ==
Before Missouri Boy, Myrick had no intention of writing anything autobiographical, as he considers himself "a very private person". The work began as a series of poems that he converted into graphic novel format. One chapter of the book, titled "Paper Airplanes", was published in the anthology Happy Endings, by Dark Horse Comics in 2002. Myrick's wife felt that this was his best work, and encouraged him to convert more of his poems. Subsequently, he took a selection of his poems that would represent a complete narrative, and the collection became Missouri Boy.

== Reception ==
Missouri Boy was praised for its "vibrant imagery", realistic art, and "powerful moments". Reviewers drew comparisons to Chester Brown's I Never Liked You, and John Porcellino's Perfect Example in terms of subject matter. A reviewer in VOYA said the facial drawing and expression was "rudimentary", but also that the "simplistic style works best for the story." The American Library Association named Missouri Boy on its top ten graphic novels for youth in 2007.
