= Kaijumax =

Comic series

Publication information
- Publisher: Oni Press
- Genre: Comedy; drama; sci-fi
- Publication date: March 18, 2015 – 2022
- No. of issues: 5

Creative team
- Written by: Zander Cannon
- Artist: Zander Cannon

Kaijumax is a comic series by two-time Eisner Award-winning creator Zander Cannon published by Oni Press. The comic is centered around an island prison whose inmates are kaiju (monsters) and whose guards have powers similar to Ultraman. Kaijumax was a nominee in the "Best New Series" category of the 2016 Eisner Awards. Kaijumax is published monthly in seasons, with an indeterminate amount of time between seasons.

On the inspiration for the series, Cannon has stated: "A lot of people assume that my comic Kaijumax is taken on Godzilla, but Ultraman is the real inspiration: deliriously fast-paced, utterly unconcerned with continuity, and with beautiful monster designs throughout all its incarnations."
