= Bone Sharps, Cowboys, and Thunder Lizards =

2005 graphic novel by Jim Ottaviani

- Cover of Bone Sharps, Cowboys, and Thunder Lizards
- Author: Jim Ottaviani
- Illustrator: Big Time Attic
- Language: English
- Publisher: G.T. Labs
- Publication date: October 2005
- Publication place: United States
- Media type: Print Paperback
- Pages: 165 pp
- ISBN: 978-0-9660106-6-4
- OCLC: 62186178
- LC Class: QE707.C63 O88 2005

Bone Sharps, Cowboys, and Thunder Lizards: A Tale of Edward Drinker Cope, Othniel Charles Marsh, and the Gilded Age of Paleontology is a 2005 graphic novel written by Jim Ottaviani and illustrated by the company Big Time Attic. The book tells a fictionalized account of the Bone Wars, a period of intense excavation, speculation, and rivalry in the late 19th century that led to a greater understanding of dinosaurs and other prehistoric life. Bone Sharps follows the two scientists Edward Drinker Cope and Othniel Marsh as they engage in an intense competition for prestige and discoveries in the western United States. Along the way, the scientists interact with historical figures of the Gilded Age, including P. T. Barnum and Ulysses S. Grant.

Ottaviani grew interested in the time period after reading a book about the Bone Wars. Finding Cope and Marsh unlikeable and the historical account dry, he decided to fictionalize events to service a better story. Ottaviani placed the artist Charles R. Knight into the narrative as a relatable character for audiences. The novel was the first work of historical fiction Ottaviani had written; previously he had taken no creative license with the characters depicted. Upon release, the novel generally received praise from critics for its exceptional historical content, and was used in schools as an educational tool.

== Plot summary ==
Othniel Charles Marsh is on a train between New York City and New Haven, where he meets the showman Phineas T. Barnum. Barnum shows Marsh a copy of the Cardiff Giant; Marsh informs Barnum he intends to expose the giant as a fake. In Philadelphia, Henry Fairfield Osborn introduces artist Charles R. Knight to Edward Drinker Cope, a paleontologist whose entire house is filled with bones and specimens. Cope is commissioning a painting of the sea creature Elasmosaurus. Cope leaves for the West as the official scientist for the U.S. Geological Survey (USGS). On the way, he meets Marsh and shows him his dig site at a marl pit in New Jersey. After Cope leaves, Marsh pays off the landowner to gain exclusive digging rights. At Fort Bridger, Wyoming, Cope meets Sam Smith, a helper to the USGS. During excavations, Cope finds some of the richest bone veins ever. Sending carloads of dinosaur bones back east, Cope encounters Marsh, who is heading out west as well; he travels in style while the rest of his team travels third class. Marsh meets "Buffalo" Bill Cody, who serves as their guide, along with a Native American Indian tribe. Marsh discovers many new fossils, and promises to Chief Red Cloud that he will talk to the President of the United States about his people's situation. Back East, Knight has finished his reconstruction of Elasmosaurus. He and Knight return to the marl pits. Cope becomes furious when he learns Marsh has bought the digging rights and published a paper revealing his reconstruction of Elasmosaurus as flawed.

Cope (speaking) and Knight (standing to Cope's left) in a panel from the comic (top); the scene is based on Georges-Pierre Seurat's 1884 painting, A Sunday Afternoon on the Island of La Grande Jatte.

Some time later, bone hunter John Bell Hatcher has taken to gambling, as Marsh is not providing him with enough funds. Marsh lobbies the Bureau of Indian Affairs on behalf of Red Cloud, but also visits with the USGS, insinuating that he would be a better leader than Cope. After learning about Sam Smith's attempted sabotage of Cope and once again receiving no payment from Marsh, Hatcher leaves his employ. Marsh, now representing the survey, heads west with wealthy businessmen, scoffing at the financial misfortunes of Cope, whose investments have failed.

Cope travels with Knight to Europe; Knight with the intention of visiting Parisian zoos, Cope with the intent of selling off much of his bone collection. Cope has spent much of his money buying The American Naturalist, a paper in which he plans to attack Marsh. Hatcher arrives in New York to talk about the find Laelaps; in his speech, he hints at the folly of Marsh's elitism and Cope's collecting obsession. Marsh learns that his USGS expense tab (to which he had been charging drinks) has been withdrawn, his publication has been suspended, and the fossils he found as part of the USGS are to be returned to the Survey. His colleagues now shun him, the Bone Wars feud having alienated them. He is forced to go to Barnum to try to obtain a loan.

Osborn and Knight arrive at Cope's residence to find the paleontologist has died of illness. The funeral is attended only by the two friends and a few Quakers. Cope has bequeathed his remains to science, and requested to have his bones considered for the Homo sapiens lectotype. Back at Marsh's residence, the visiting Chief Red Cloud examines Marsh's luxuries. Red Cloud's interest is piqued by a long tusk from a mastodon. Marsh relates an ancient Shawnee legend that once there were giant men proportionate to the mastodons before they died out. Chief Red Cloud remarks that it is a true story; Marsh rebukes him, saying that science says man's ancestors were smaller than him. As he leaves, Red Cloud responds, "It is not a story about science. It is about men."

Years later Knight and his wife are taking their granddaughter Rhoda to the American Museum of Natural History. Knight is visiting the new mammoth specimens: the girl, however, is eager to see more of her grandfather's paintings. Meanwhile, the staff are sorting Marsh's long-neglected collection of fossils. Two of the workers discover Knight's Leaping Laelaps has been accidentally left in the storeroom. The painting is taken back downstairs while the workmen leave Cope's and Marsh's bones behind.

== Development ==
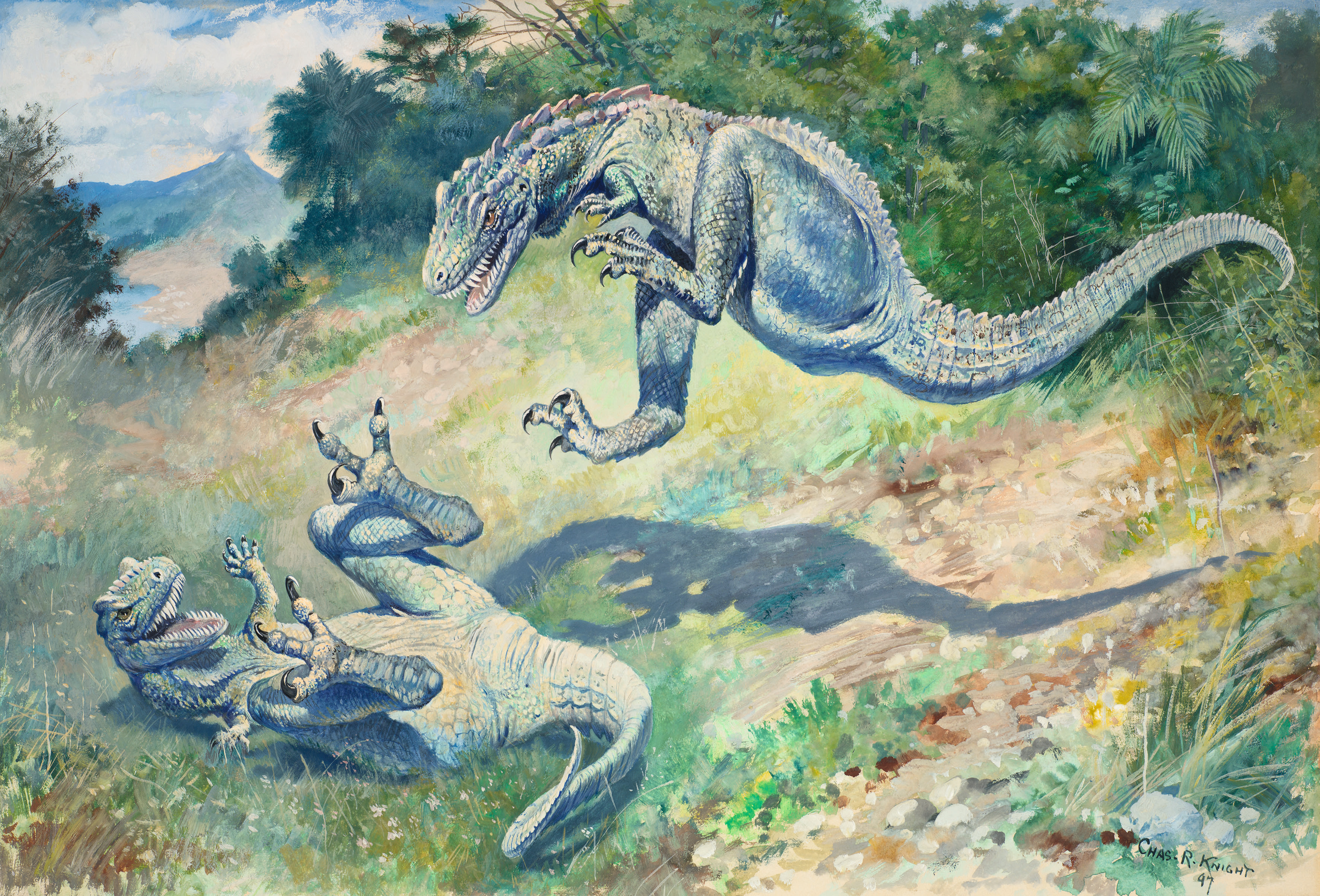
Leaping Laelaps by Charles R. Knight. Ottaviani mentions the theory that Knight drew it as an intentional allegory for the Cope/Marsh conflict.

Jim Ottaviani published his first graphic novel in 1997, and conceived the idea for Bone Sharps while working his day job as a librarian at the University of Michigan in Ann Arbor. Ottaviani's job included purchasing books for engineering topics, but a new book about the Bone Wars caught his eye. He bought the book himself and found himself fascinated by the rivalry between Cope and Marsh. He described his process as spending time doing research, before turning an outline and timeline into a structured story. Using the book as a starting point, Ottaviani read the accounts and biographies of Cope and Marsh as well as other period sources. During the course of his research Ottaviani found the then-unpublished autobiography of Charles Knight. The book inspired him to make the book into a work of historical fiction, something Ottaviani had not done in previous non-fiction books and comics on scientific figures. "I found the whole 'war' aspect [of the Bone Wars] over-hyped," Ottaviani recalled. "These guys never came to blows, or even did anything that went very far beyond questionable ethics." In comparison to his previous works, Ottaviani called the scientists "the bad guys".

While the majority of Bone Sharps is true and all of it is based on history, Ottaviani took liberties throughout to better serve the story. In real life, Knight did not meet Cope until only a few years before Cope's death; In addition, Knight's autobiography states that it was reporter William Hosea Ballou who introduced the two, not Osborn. There is also no evidence Marsh and Knight ever met. On Knight's role in the story, Ottaviani wrote:

As I was reading about Cope and Marsh, I ran across Knight as something of a bit player in their lives. As I got further into the Cope and Marsh story, and I liked the two less and less as people—which is different from liking them as characters, of course—I wanted to have a character in the book for the readers to root for, and neither of the scientists could fill that role. When I found out that Knight had met Cope just before Cope died, I became convinced that he was the character I needed.

Ottaviani's interest in Knight eventually led to his company G.T. Labs publishing Knight's autobiography, with notes by Ottaviani and forewords by Ray Bradbury and Ray Harryhausen. Other character relationships were fictionalized as well: editor James Gordon Bennet Jr. never lobbied with Cope, and never exposed Marsh's will. Cope's bones also never made it to New York. Some conversations, due to their private nature, were fictionalized; Ottaviani makes up Marsh's lobby to Congress and what happened during his meeting with President Grant, and P.T. Barnum never told off Marsh the way he did in the novel. Ottaviani wove the story Marsh tells about the Mastodon from several different versions of the legend. A key plot point is fabricated for the purposes of dramatic irony: in the book, Marsh has his agent Sam Smith leave a Camarasaurus skull for Cope to find and mistakenly put on the wrong dinosaur. Instead, Hatcher finds it; Smith tries to keep an unwitting Marsh from getting it, but due to Marsh's obnoxious manner he lets him after all. As a result, Marsh mistakenly classifies the (non-existent) Brontosaurus. Ottaviani wholly invented this scene, as "The literary tradition of hoisting someone up by his own petard was too good to pass up."

While Ottaviani was putting his ideas together, he met Zander Cannon at the 2004 San Diego Comic Convention. Cannon and associates were forming a new production studio, "Big Time Attic"; Ottaviani mentioned he had a proposal he wanted to show them. Ottaviani considered such a new studio taking on as large a project as a 160-page graphic novel was "ambitious" and that he was lucky to have had the book published. Even the format—the book is wider than it is tall—was a departure for Ottaviani. He explained that since the story was talking about "wide expanses of territory" and the American West, the artists at Big Time Attic wanted a more non-traditional landscape orientation.

== Reception ==
The book was generally well-received upon release. Comic book letterer Todd Klein recommended the book to his readers, stating that the novel was able to convey the depths of Cope and Marsh's rivalry and "we can only wonder how much more could have been accomplished if [Cope and Marsh] had only been willing to team up instead". Klein's complaints focused on stiff art and the difficulty in telling some characters apart, but said these shortcomings did not affect the flow and reading. Johanna Carlson of Comics Worth Reading found Bone Sharps's central message, "the question of whether promotion is a necessary evil (to gather funds through attention) or a base desire of those with the wrong motivations", still relevant to today's society; Carlson lauded the flow of the novel and some of the intricate details in the story and setting. Other reviewers praised Ottaviani's inclusion of notable historical figures, the educational yet entertaining feel of the work, and expressive artwork.

In addition to minor issues with the art, Entertainment Weekly's Tom Russo felt that more fiction could have been used in the mostly non-fiction writing. In contrast, Peter Guitérrez felt that given Ottaviani's liberties with conversations the book veered too far into fiction at points; the book's inclusion of an "exhaustive" appendix to separate reality from creative liberties was welcomed. Kirkus Reviews recommended the book to adults and children interested in scholarly dinosaur information.

Due to the historical background of the book, Bone Sharps was used in schools, as part of a study testing the effects of using comic books to educate young children. Author and professor Karen Gavigan recommended the book and Ottaviani's other work as a way to make the lives of famous scientists more accessible and offering chances for critical thinking. Ottaviani followed Bone Sharps with other lightly fictionalized historical stories, including Levitation: Physics and Psychology in the Service of Deception and Wire Mothers: Harry Harlow and the Science of Love.
