= Jim Ottaviani =

American writer

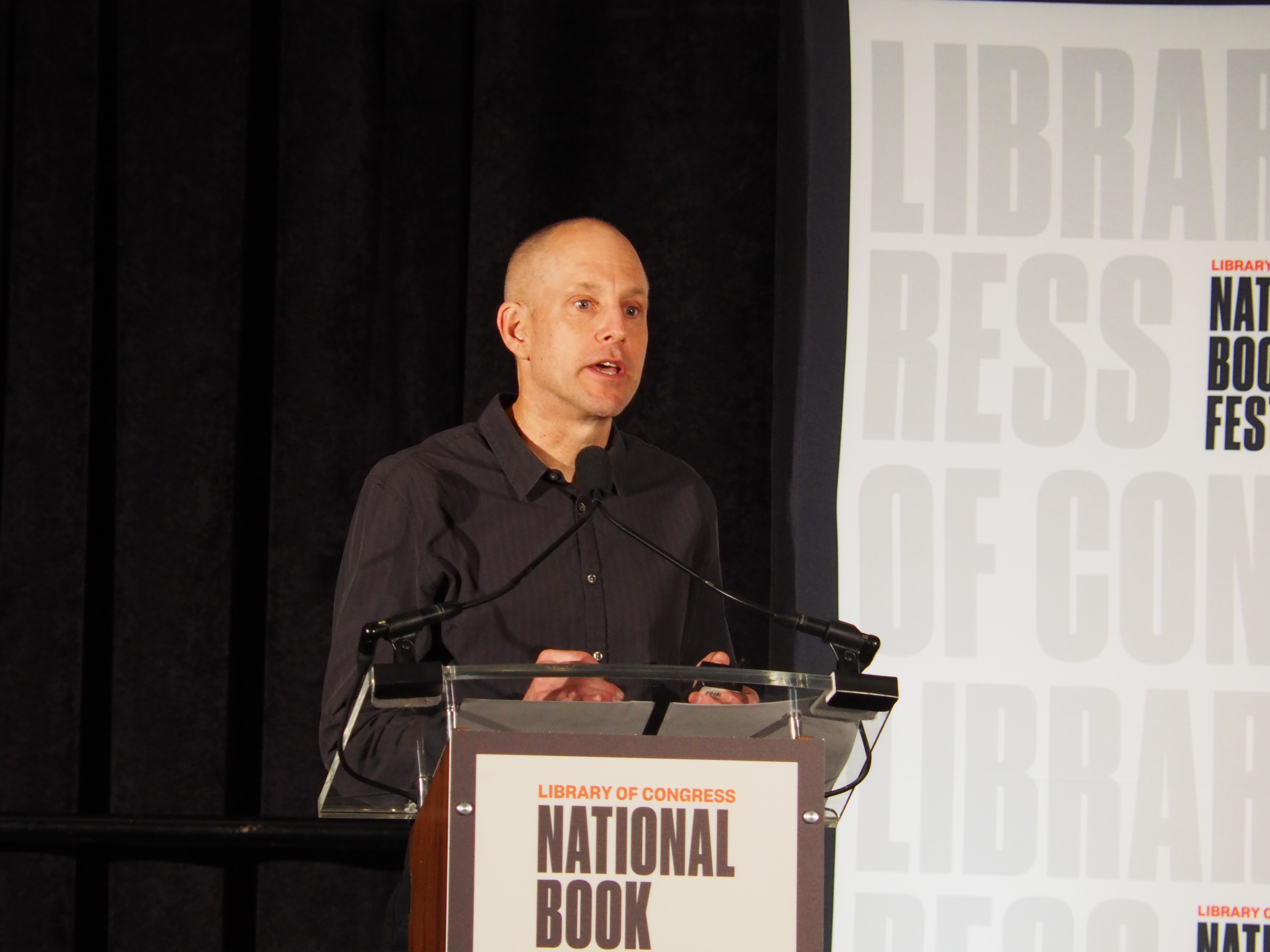
- Area: Writer
- Notable works: Two-Fisted Science; Fallout: J. Robert Oppenheimer, Leo Szilard, and the Political Science of the Atomic Bomb; Dignifying Science: Stories about Women Scientists, Feynman
- Collaborators: Steve Lieber, Leland Myrick, Leland Purvis, Bernie Mireault, Zander Cannon, Kevin Cannon
- Awards: Xeric Grant, 1997

Jim Ottaviani is an American writer who is the author of several comic books about the history of science. His best-known work, Two-Fisted Science: Stories About Scientists, features biographical stories about Galileo Galilei, Isaac Newton, Niels Bohr, and several stories about physicist Richard Feynman. He is also a librarian and has worked as a nuclear engineer.

== Biography ==
Ottaviani has a background in science, earning a B.S. at the University of Illinois at Urbana-Champaign in 1986, followed by a master's degree in nuclear engineering from the University of Michigan in 1987. He worked for several years retrofitting and fixing nuclear power plants. Intrigued by the research component of his job, Ottaviani began taking library science courses at Drexel University, and in 1990 he enrolled in the Library and Information Science program at the University of Michigan. He earned his M.S. in information and library studies from Michigan in 1992. He spent several years working as a reference librarian at Michigan's Media Union Library. He now works at the University of Michigan Library as coordinator of Deep Blue, the university's institutional repository.

Ottaviani's interest in writing science-related comics was inspired by Richard Rhodes's book The Making of the Atomic Bomb. In discussing the book with comic book artist Steve Lieber, the two decided to write and illustrate a famous meeting between physicists Niels Bohr and Werner Heisenberg during World War II. That project expanded to include other stories from the history of science to become the graphic novel Two-Fisted Science, including stories written by Ottaviani and illustrated by a variety of artists.

Since the publication of Two-Fisted Science, Ottaviani has gone on to write several other comic books about scientists, including Dignifying Science (about women scientists), Fallout (about the creation of the atomic bomb), Suspended in Language (about physicist Niels Bohr) and Bone Sharps, Cowboys, and Thunder Lizards (about nineteenth century paleontologists). These works are all self-published by Ottaviani's own company, G. T. Labs, which he started in 1996. The company's name is an homage to General Techtronics Labs, the fictional company where comic book character Peter Parker was bitten by the radioactive spider that led to his becoming Spider-Man.

Two of Ottaviani's most recent works Levitation and Wire Mothers (published July 2007) are the beginning of a planned series on "the science of the unscientific." Levitation the physical and psychological aspects of stage magic. Wire Mothers is tells the story of psychologist Harry Harlow's work in the 1950s on importance of love and affection among primates, in contravention of then-prevailing theories put forward by the Behaviorist school of thought.

In addition to his self-published work, Ottaviani has worked on two short comic books about orangutans, one of which was published by the Orangutan Foundation International. He also has two forthcoming comics in the works to be published by First Second Books, one on physicist Richard Feynman and another on three primatologists: Jane Goodall, Dian Fossey, and Biruté Galdikas.

On August 31, 2011, Ottaviani appeared on the Science Channel's Dark Matters: Twisted But True.

On November 15, 2013, First Second announced that it would publish Ottaviani's upcoming biography of Stephen Hawking with illustrations by Leland Myrick. In June 2014, Tor.com released Ottaviani and Leland Purvis' Alan Turing biography, The Imitation Game, for free online. An expanded, print version of the book appeared in 2016.

== Awards ==
Ottaviani's 2001 graphic novel Fallout: J. Robert Oppenheimer, Leo Szilard, and the Political Science of the Atomic Bomb was nominated for the 2002 Ignatz Award for Outstanding Graphic Novel or Collection. Dignifying Science: Stories about Women Scientists was nominated for a 1999 Eisner Award and for the 2000 Lulu Award. The 2003 Quantum entanglement, spooky action at a distance, teleportation, and you was nominated for the 2004 Ignatz Award for Outstanding Minicomic. Ottaviani was also awarded a 1997 Xeric Foundation grant for Two-Fisted Science.

== Bibliography ==
- Safecracker, (artist: Bernie Mireault) General Tektronics Labs, 1997, excerpted from Two-Fisted Science.
- Two-Fisted Science: Stories About Scientists, (various artists) General Tektronics Labs, 1997. ISBN 978-0-9660106-0-2.
  - Second edition, G. T. Labs, 2001. ISBN 978-0-9660106-2-6.
- Wild person in the woods (artist: Anne Timmons). Orangutan Foundation International, 1998.
- "Talking" orangutans in Borneo (by Nancy Briggs and Jim Ottaviani; illustrated by Anne Timmons), Orangutan Foundation International, 2000.
- Fallout: J. Robert Oppenheimer, Leo Szilard, and the Political Science of the Atomic Bomb, (various artists) G. T. Labs, 2001. ISBN 978-0-9660106-3-3.
- Dignifying Science: stories about women scientists, (various artists) Second edition, G. T. Labs, 2003. ISBN 978-0-9660106-4-0.
- Quantum Entanglement, Spooky Action at a Distance, Teleportation, and You : a.k.a the Official G.T. Labs Guide to Teleportation via Quantum Entanglement and Spooky Action at a Distance (Including a Brief but Helpful Section on Why, Perhaps, You Should Not Try This at Home), (artist: Roger Langridge) G. T. Labs, 2003.
- Suspended In Language: Niels Bohr's Life, Discoveries, And The Century He Shaped, (artist: Leland Purvis) G.T. Labs, 2004. ISBN 978-0-9660106-5-7.
- Bone Sharps, Cowboys, and Thunder Lizards: A Tale of Edward Drinker Cope, Othniel Charles Marsh, and the Gilded Age of Paleontology (artist: Big Time Attic), G. T. Labs, 2005. ISBN 978-0-9660106-6-4.
- Levitation: Physics and Psychology in the Service of Deception (artist: Janine Johnston), G.T. Labs, 2007: ISBN 978-0-9788037-0-4
- Wire Mothers: Harry Harlow and the Science of Love (artist: Dylan Meconis), G.T. Labs, 2007: ISBN 978-0-9788037-1-1
- T-Minus: The Race to the Moon (artists: Zander Cannon & Kevin Cannon), Aladdin, 2009: ISBN 978-1-4169-4960-2
- Feynman (artist: Leland Myrick), First Second, 2011: ISBN 978-1-59643-259-8
- Primates: The Fearless Science of Jane Goodall, Dian Fossey, and Biruté Galdikas, illustrated by Maris Wicks, First Second, 2013, ISBN 978-1-5964386-5-1
- The Imitation Game, illustrated by Leland Purvis, Tor.com, 2014.
- The Imitation Game: Alan Turing Decoded (artist: Leland Purvis), Harry N. Abrams, 2016, ISBN 978-1-4197189-3-9
- Hawking (artist: Leland Myrick), First Second, 2019, ISBN 9781626720251
- Naturalist (by Edward O. Wilson; adapted by Jim Ottaviani and C.M. Butzer; artist: C.M. Butzer), Island Press, 2020 ISBN 9781610919586
- Astronauts: Women on the Final Frontier (artist: Maris Wicks), First Second, 2020, ISBN 9781626728776
- Einstein (artist: Jerel Dye), First Second, 2022, ISBN 9781626728769
