= Leland Myrick =

American novelist

- Born: 1961 (age 64–65); Missouri, U.S.
- Education: University of Missouri–St. Louis; California State University, Los Angeles
- Occupations: Author and illustrator
- Children: 1
- Writing career
- Notable work: Missouri Boy

Leland Myrick (born 1961) is an American author and illustrator. In 1999, he was nominated for an Ignatz Award for Promising New Talent for The Sweet Collection, and in 2004 he was awarded a Xeric Grant to create Bright Elegy. He illustrated the New York Times-bestselling Feynman (2011), a graphic biography of Richard Feynman written by Jim Ottaviani for First Second Books. Myrick's first fantasy novel, The Ten, was named to Kirkus Reviews Best Indie Books of 2012.

== Personal life and education ==
Myrick was born in 1961 in Missouri. He received degrees in English and counseling from the University of Missouri–St. Louis and California State University, Los Angeles. He has one child.

Myrick currently lives in St. Charles, Missouri.

== Publications ==
=== Graphic novels ===
- The Sweet Collection (2000)
- Bright Elegy (2004)
- Missouri Boy (2006)
- Feynman (written by Jim Ottaviani, 2011): Biography of Richard Feynman
- Hawking (written by Jim Ottaviani, 2019): Biography of Stephen Hawking

=== Graphic short stories ===
- "Storm Coming" (9-11: Artists Respond, vol. 1, 2002)
- "Paper Airplanes" (Happy Endings, 2002)
- "Sustain This Song" (Flight, vol. 7, 2010)
- "The Collector" (Flight, vol. 8, 2011)

=== Novels ===
- The Ten (Kingdom of the Graves series, book 1, 2012)
- Mark of the Blooded (Kingdom of the Graves series, book 2, 2012)
