= Bruce Wayne: Fugitive =

DC Comics storyline

"Bruce Wayne: Murderer?" "Bruce Wayne: Fugitive"
- Cover to Batman: Bruce Wayne - Fugitive, Vol. 2 (March 2003), art by Scott McDaniel.
- Publisher: DC Comics
- Publication date: March – September 2002
- Genre: Superhero; Crossover
Title(s)
Murderer
Batgirl #24
Batman #599
Batman: The 10-Cent Adventure #1
Batman: Gotham Knights #25-26
Birds of Prey #39-40
Detective Comics #766-767
Nightwing #65-66
Robin (vol. 2) #98-99
Fugitive
Azrael: Agent of the Bat #91
Batgirl #27, #29, 33
Batman #600-601, #603, #605-607
Batman: Gotham Knights #27-28, #30-31
Birds of Prey #41-43
Detective Comics #768-775
Nightwing #68-69
- Main character: Batman
- Murderer?: ISBN 1-56389-913-2
- Volume 1: ISBN 1563899337
- Volume 2: ISBN 1563899477
- Volume 3: ISBN 1401200796

"Bruce Wayne: Fugitive" is a storyline that ran through the Batman comic books in 2002. The story directly follows the "Bruce Wayne: Murderer?" story.

== "Bruce Wayne: Murderer?" ==
At the end of Batman: The 10-Cent Adventure #1, Bruce Wayne finds his girlfriend, Vesper Fairchild, dead in Wayne Manor just as police arrive. The Gotham City Police Department promptly charges Wayne for murder, and both Wayne and his bodyguard Sasha Bordeaux are imprisoned, leaving the Batman Family to work the crime and absolve them. However, the investigation is complicated when evidence is uncovered suggesting that Vesper knew who Batman was, thus giving Bruce a motive for the crime that only the Batman Family would ever be able to notice, as well as Sasha (who was crime-fighting with Bruce the night of Vesper's murder) having been separated from Bruce for a time that would have allowed him to commit the murder without her knowing. Driven to near-breaking point by his frustration at being forced in jail to constantly behave like Bruce Wayne rather than being free to solve this dilemma as Batman, Bruce then escapes from jail and announces his intention to no longer live life as Bruce Wayne (since his alter-ego is now a wanted fugitive), and begins life as only Batman.

The story runs through Batgirl #24, Batman #599, Batman: Gotham Knights #25-26, Birds of Prey #39-40, Detective Comics #766-767, Nightwing #65-66, and Robin (vol. 2) #98-99.

== "Bruce Wayne: Fugitive" ==
With Batman free, the Batman Family continues to investigate the circumstances of the crime. Many start to doubt Bruce's innocence. Oracle (with some assistance from Black Canary) recovers a disk proving the journal entries from Vesper's apartment had been altered. This means Vesper did not know Batman's identity.

Meanwhile, Batgirl, upon uncovering Vesper's corpse, realizes that Vesper was killed using a nerve strike and careful beatings, whereas the evidence suggests it was a 'spur-of-the-moment' attack on Bruce's part. Nightwing and Alfred discover that infiltration of the Batcave is possible and ties in with the police's timely entrance at Wayne Manor. With further assistance from Robin they uncover some evidence in their search, although Nightwing is forced to acknowledge that nothing that they have discovered is anything that Batman couldn't have reasonably planted to throw them off (even if he considers it ridiculous that Batman would kill someone and frame himself for the crime). After the group reviews the evidence and Nightwing and Batgirl stage how the murder took place based on the tape recording of Vesper's last moments, Nightwing is now convinced that the Bruce he knows could not have committed the murder, and decides their next move is to focus on gathering evidence that would not compromise Bruce's secret identity.

At the same time, Batman launches his own, independent, investigation into his framing and steadily uncovers a conspiracy against Bruce Wayne after a run-in with David Said of Checkmate, subsequently having Said committed to Arkham under a false name in case he needs him later. A confrontation between himself and Catwoman prompts Batman to realize how important his Bruce Wayne identity is; he is moved to protect a wounded criminal during their meeting because that is what his father, Thomas Wayne, would have done. An earlier meeting with the detective who comforted him after his parents' deaths also serves to reinforce the importance of Bruce Wayne in Batman's life; as far as the detective is concerned, it was Bruce Wayne's life that was forever defined by the death of his parents...and the detective is also convinced that, whatever Bruce Wayne became that night, he did not become a killer.

After returning to the Batcave and apologizing for his past actions, Batman reveals to the Batman Family that the murderer is David Cain, which he had deduced based solely on the evidence that Batgirl found earlier; the nerve strike that was used to immobilize Vesper is one that Bruce learned from Cain. Cain had been hired by then-President Lex Luthor to discredit Bruce Wayne for his stance against Luthor during the No Man's Land storyline. Cain subsequently deduces Batman's true identity, recalling his own acquaintance with a young Bruce when Bruce went to him for training. He was thus able to frame him for a crime where the only motive was Batman's desire to protect his identity. Capturing Cain, Bruce's name is subsequently cleared, Cain keeping Bruce's identity as Batman secret to protect his daughter.

This story runs through Azrael: Agent of the Bat #91; Batgirl #27 and #29; Batman #600-601, #603, and #605; Batman: Gotham Knights #27-28 and #30-31; Birds of Prey #41-43; Detective Comics #768-772; and Nightwing #68-69.

== "Batman Bruce Wayne: Murderer Turned Fugitive Omnibus" ==
In December 2024 a new trade paperback was published which contained all elements of the storyline.

It contained the same 42 comics as per the 2014 edition.

== Reading order ==
Bruce Wayne: Murderer?:

- Prelude: Batman: The 10-Cent Adventure
- Part 1: Detective Comics #766
- Part 2: Batgirl #24
- Part 3: Nightwing (vol. 2) #65
- Part 4: Batman: Gotham Knights #25
- Part 5: Birds of Prey #39
- Part 6: Robin (vol. 4) #98
- Part 7: Batman #599
- Part 8: Detective Comics #767
- Part 9: Nightwing (vol. 2) #66
- Part 10: Batman: Gotham Knights #26
- Part 11: Robin (vol. 4) #99
- Part 12: Birds of Prey #40

Bruce Wayne: Fugitive:

- Part 1: Batman #600

[Detective Comics #768 (not part of Fugitive, but part of "Purity" only in DC magazines and included in #Collected editions)]

- Part 2: Birds of Prey #41

[Batman: Gotham Knights #27 (not part of Fugitive, but included in #Collected editions)]

- Part 3: Batman #601
- Part 4: Detective Comics #769
- Part 5: Batgirl #27
- Part 6: Nightwing (vol. 2) #68
- Part 7: Batman: Gotham Knights #28
- Part 8: Detective Comics #770
- Part 9: Nightwing (vol. 2) #69
- Part 10: Birds of Prey #43
- Part 11: Batman #603
- Part 12: Detective Comics #771
- Part 13: Batgirl #29
- Part 14: Batman: Gotham Knights #30
- Part 15: Azrael: Agent of the Bat #91 (not included in #Collected editions)
- Part 16: Detective Comics #772
- Part 17: Batman: Gotham Knights #31
- Part 18: Batman #605

Aftermath of Fugitive:

- Part 1: Detective Comics #773
- Part 2: Detective Comics #774
- Part 3: Detective Comics #775
- Part 4: Batman #606
- Part 5: Batman #607
- Part 6: Batgirl #33

== Collected editions ==
The Bruce Wayne: Murderer? and Bruce Wayne: Fugitive storylines have been collected in several volumes:

Title	Material collected	Publication date	ISBN
Batman: Bruce Wayne – Murderer?	Batman: The 10-Cent Adventure, Detective Comics #766–767, Batgirl (vol. 2) #24, Nightwing (vol. 2) #65–66, Batman: Gotham Knights #25–26, Birds of Prey #39–40, Robin (vol. 4) #98–99, and Batman #599–600	August 2002	264 pages, paperback, ISBN 1-56389-913-2
Batman: Bruce Wayne – Fugitive Volume One	Batman #601 and 603, Batman: Gotham Knights #27–28, Batgirl (vol. 2) #27 and #29, Birds of Prey #41 and 43, Nightwing (vol. 2) #68–69	December 2002	160 pages, paperback, ISBN 1-56389-933-7
Batman: Bruce Wayne – Fugitive Volume Two	Detective Comics #768–772, Batman: Gotham Knights #31, Batman #605	March 2003	176 pages, paperback, ISBN 1-56389-947-7
Batman: Bruce Wayne – Fugitive Volume Three	Detective Comics #773–775, Batman #606–607, Batgirl (vol. 2) #33	October 2003	176 pages, paperback, ISBN 1-4012-0079-6

The Bruce Wayne - Murderer? storyline is being reprinted in a new edition. Another new single volume edition has been announced for Bruce Wayne - Fugitive, including stories that have never before been reprinted:

Title	Material collected	Publication date	ISBN
Batman: Bruce Wayne - Murderer? (new edition)	Batgirl (vol. 2) #24, 27, Batman #599-602, Batman: Gotham Knights #25-28, Batman: The 10-Cent Adventure, Birds Of Prey #39-41, Detective Comics #766-770, Nightwing vol. 2 #65-66, 68-69, Robin (vol. 4) #98-99	March 18, 2014	978-1401246839
Batman: Bruce Wayne - Fugitive (new edition)	Batman #603-607, Detective Comics #771-775, Batman: Gotham Knights #29-32, Batgirl (vol. 2) #29, 33, Birds of Prey #43	July 15, 2014	978-1401246822

=== Reprinting and recall ===
In March 2014, DC Comics released a new edition of the Batman: Bruce Wayne - Murderer? trade paperback (to be followed by a new, single edition of the Batman: Bruce Wayne - Fugitive trade) that contained issues not collected in the previous trades. Customers immediately expressed concerns that, among other issues, the Murderer trade omitted Detective Comics #768, "Purity Part 1", even though the trade collected Detective Comics #766-767 and #769-770, and that one of the original Fugitive trades had also collected Detective Comics #768. In addition, the book's table of contents incorrectly referred to Detective Comics #769 as "Purity Part 1", when it is actually "Purity Part 2".

A week later, DC Comics announced plans to recall the Batman: Bruce Wayne - Murderer? new edition trade, asking retailers to accept returns from customers and destroy existing copies. DC told retailers a corrected edition would be released in May and would include Detective Comics #768, Batman: Gotham Knights #29, and fixes to the table of contents and to the order the issues are presented in the book.
