= Whiteout (2009 film) =

2009 film by Dominic Sena

- Theatrical release poster
- Directed by: Dominic Sena
- Screenplay by: Jon Hoeber; Erich Hoeber; Chad Hayes; Carey Hayes
- Based on: Whiteout by Greg Rucka & Steve Lieber
- Produced by: Joel Silver; Susan Downey; David Gambino
- Starring: Kate Beckinsale; Gabriel Macht; Columbus Short; Tom Skerritt
- Cinematography: Christopher Soos
- Edited by: Martin Hunter
- Music by: John Frizzell
- Production companies: Dark Castle Entertainment; Don Carmody Productions
- Distributed by: Warner Bros. Pictures (International); StudioCanal (France)
- Release dates: September 11, 2009 (Canada and United States); October 21, 2009 (France)
- Running time: 101 minutes
- Countries: United States; France; Canada
- Languages: English; Russian
- Budget: $35 million
- Box office: $17.8 million

Whiteout (French: Whiteout: Enfer blanc) is a 2009 crime thriller film based on the 1998 comic book of the same name by Greg Rucka and Steve Lieber. Directed by Dominic Sena and starring Kate Beckinsale, Gabriel Macht, Columbus Short and Tom Skerritt, the film was distributed by Warner Bros. Pictures and released on September 11, 2009. It was produced under the banner of Dark Castle Entertainment by Joel Silver, Susan Downey and David Gambino. The film is set in Antarctica, where Deputy U.S. Marshal Carrie Stetko (Kate Beckinsale) is planning to leave in a few days. After finding a dead body, Stetko is attacked by a masked killer who is trying to get ahold of the cargo in an old Soviet plane that crash-landed in the ice during the Cold War.

== Plot ==
In 1957, a Russian cargo plane is flying above Antarctica. In the cockpit, the two pilots conspire to kill three men sitting in the hold guarding a padlocked box. The copilot leaves his seat and begins to shoot the other men. They return fire, and the pilot is shot and incapacitated during the gunfight, causing a crash which kills everyone aboard.

In the modern era, newcomers arrive at the United States' Amundsen–Scott South Pole Station in Antarctica, while those scheduled to leave before the onset of winter are preparing to do so early because of an impending storm. Among those leaving is Deputy U.S. Marshal Carrie Stetko, who has been working in Antarctica for two years after her partner in Miami betrayed and nearly killed her. She confides in the station's doctor, John "Doc" Fury, that she plans to resign after returning to the United States.

A pilot named Delfy reports a dead body and flies Stetko and Doc out to the remote Haworth Mesa to retrieve it. The dead man is Anton Weiss, one of a group of three scientists looking for meteorites. An autopsy performed by Doc finds stitching on a leg wound and evidence of murder by ice axe. Stetko considers sending the body to McMurdo Station to avoid spending the winter in Antarctica, but she instead continues the investigation herself. She receives a call from John Mooney, another of the three scientists, asking her to meet him at Vostok Station. She and Delfy fly to Vostok but cannot find him. Stetko discovers Mooney dying from a neck wound and is attacked by a black-clad man with an ice axe. She escapes but injures her hands, losing the wet skin of her fingers on the metal handle of a door and falling unconscious.

Returning to the murder scene, Stetko and Delfy find Robert Pryce, a United Nations security agent, examining Mooney's body. They conclude that the missing third scientist, Michael Rubin, must be the killer and set out to explore the group's most recent search site. There, Stetko falls through the ice and finds the old Russian cargo plane. Pryce and Delfy join her to investigate, and they find the locked box opened and six cylinders removed. Pryce suggests that nuclear fuel of interest to arms traffickers may be in the cylinders.

Back at the station, Stetko has her two badly frostbitten fingers amputated by Doc. She then finds Rubin hiding in her office. He tells her that he and his two colleagues found the plane and took the canisters but that the killer has them now. Rubin flees and is killed before Stetko can protect him, but she captures and identifies his killer as Australian biologist Russell Haden. The base commander orders everyone to evacuate because of the murders. With Haden locked in the brig and the storm near, Stetko and Pryce search for the canisters. Haden escapes, badly injures Delfy, and tries to flee in his plane as Stetko and Pryce pursue him. The three fight outside during the storm, and as Haden is about to kill Pryce, Stetko cuts Haden's safety rope, causing him to be blown away by the storm and killed.

Stetko checks the last departing plane's cargo manifest and learns that the bodies of the dead scientists were not aboard. She searches their body bags and notices that the stitching on Weiss' wound matches the distinctive pattern on her amputated fingers. She opens the wound and finds several bags of large, uncut diamonds buried inside. Doc confesses that he, along with Weiss, Mooney, Rubin, and Haden, was part of a conspiracy to take and sell them after finding them in the canisters. When he tells Stetko he wants to see the aurora australis one last time, she allows him to walk outside to his death.

Six months later, Stetko, Pryce, and Delfy have wintered at the facility. Stetko transmits an email to her superior, rescinding her previous resignation and asking for a warmer location for her next assignment.

== Cast ==
- Kate Beckinsale as Deputy U.S. Marshal Carrie Stetko, who investigates the killings at the base.
- Gabriel Macht as U.N. Security Agent Robert Pryce, who aids Stetko in the investigation.
- Columbus Short as Delfy, a pilot who helps Stetko in the investigation.
- Tom Skerritt as Dr. John Fury, the base doctor.
- Alex O'Loughlin as Russell Haden, an Australian biologist.
- Shawn Doyle as Sam Murphy, the station's manager.
- Jesse Todd as Rubin
- Joel Keller as Deputy U.S. Marshal Jack
- Arthur Holden as McGuire
- Erin Hicock as Rhonda
- Bashar Rahal as Russian Pilot
- Julian Cain as Russian Co-Pilot
- Roman Varshavky, Dennis Keiffer, and Andrei Runtso as Russian Guards
- Steve Lucescu as John Mooney
- Paula Jean Hixson as Lab Tech
- Craig A. Pinckes as Craig Pinckes
- Sean Tucker as Operations Tech
- Marc James Beauchamp as Anton Weiss
- Nick Villarin as Newbie
- Louis Dionne as Man In Hall
- Patrick Sabongui as Miami Prisoner

== Production ==
In November 1999, Columbia Pictures acquired feature film rights to the comic book Whiteout by Greg Rucka and Steve Lieber. An adapted screenplay for the film was written by Jon and Erich Hoeber. The script was written to have a male character star opposite the female lead, since the studio was hesitant on how large a film audience the original setup of two female leads would draw. By November 2002, the studio placed the project on turnaround after a lack of production, and the rights were acquired by Universal Studios. The studio cast Reese Witherspoon to star in Whiteout, which would be based on the screenplay written by the Hoebers. By May 2004, a second draft of the script had been written, and a director was still being sought. Ultimately, rights over the film changed ownership, detaching Witherspoon from the project.

In October 2006, Whiteout entered development at Dark Castle Entertainment, with production slated to begin in the coming winter for a release date in the first quarter of 2008. Dominic Sena, a fan of the graphic novel since its '98 debut, had sought to acquire the rights to direct a film adaptation, and when rights were acquired by Dark Castle, Sena petitioned to producer Joel Silver, president of the company, for the opportunity to direct Whiteout. In February 2007, with Warner Bros. Pictures signed on to distribute Whiteout, Sena was hired to direct the film, based on the adapted screenplay by the Hoebers. In the same month, Beckinsale was cast in the lead role. Production began on March 5, 2007 in Manitoba, with later footage being shot in Montreal, Quebec. A set was also constructed on the shore of Lake Manitoba. The film was primarily set in a bright world of ice and sunlight, an unconventional approach to the murder mystery genre. Both real and fake snow were used in production.

Filming concluded a few weeks before Comic-Con in July 2007.

== Release ==
Whiteout released in theaters on September 11, 2009, and closed December 17, 2009. The film was released on DVD and Blu-ray on January 19, 2010.

== Reception ==
=== Box office ===
Whiteout was a box-office bomb, grossing $6,422,590 in its first week. Its ticket sales declined sharply in the first month, dropping by 53.6% into week 2 ($2,980,964), 80.1% into week 3 ($592,644), and 82.6% into week 4 ($103,015). In total, it grossed $10,275,638 domestically and $7,565,229 internationally – a return of $17,840,867 from a budget of $35 million.

=== Critical response ===
Whiteout was panned by critics. On the review aggregator website Rotten Tomatoes, 7% of 115 critics' reviews are positive, with an average rating of 3.5/10. The website's consensus reads: "Kate Beckinsale is as lovely as ever, and does her best with the material, but moribund pacing and an uninspired plot leave Whiteout in the cold." Metacritic, which uses a weighted average, assigned the film a score of 28 out of 100, based on 19 critics, indicating "generally unfavorable" reviews. Audiences polled by CinemaScore gave the film an average grade of "C−" on an A+ to F scale.

Richard Roeper of the Chicago Sun Times gave the film two stars out of four, calling it a "formulaic thriller that is ultimately no less predictable or interesting simply because it is set in the coldest and most isolated place on Earth." Jeremy Kay of The Guardian also gave it two stars out of four, writing, "Despite Beckinsale's impeccable features appearing to be rendered in porcelain, her performance is far from lifeless... she does the best with the material. It's just a shame the same can't be said for the film-makers." The New York Post's Kyle Smith wrote, "Wrapping things up with a 'big reveal' that's as bland as a snow sandwich, the bad guy turns out to have the most boring possible motivation and is too drained to even invoke his fundamental villain's right to be chased around for a while. I know just how you feel, buddy."

The author of the graphic novel, Greg Rucka, applauded the film adaptation of his source material, but upon seeing the finished film felt differently, saying that "Comic Carrie and One Act Play Carrie would shake Movie Carrie down behind the bleachers, laugh her out of the You Share Our Name Club, and send her limping and mewling home to mother. And they wouldn't feel a moment's regret about doing it, either."

AOL.com's Moviefone staff rated it as the eighth worst movie of 2009.
