= Kevin Cannon =

American cartoonist and illustrator

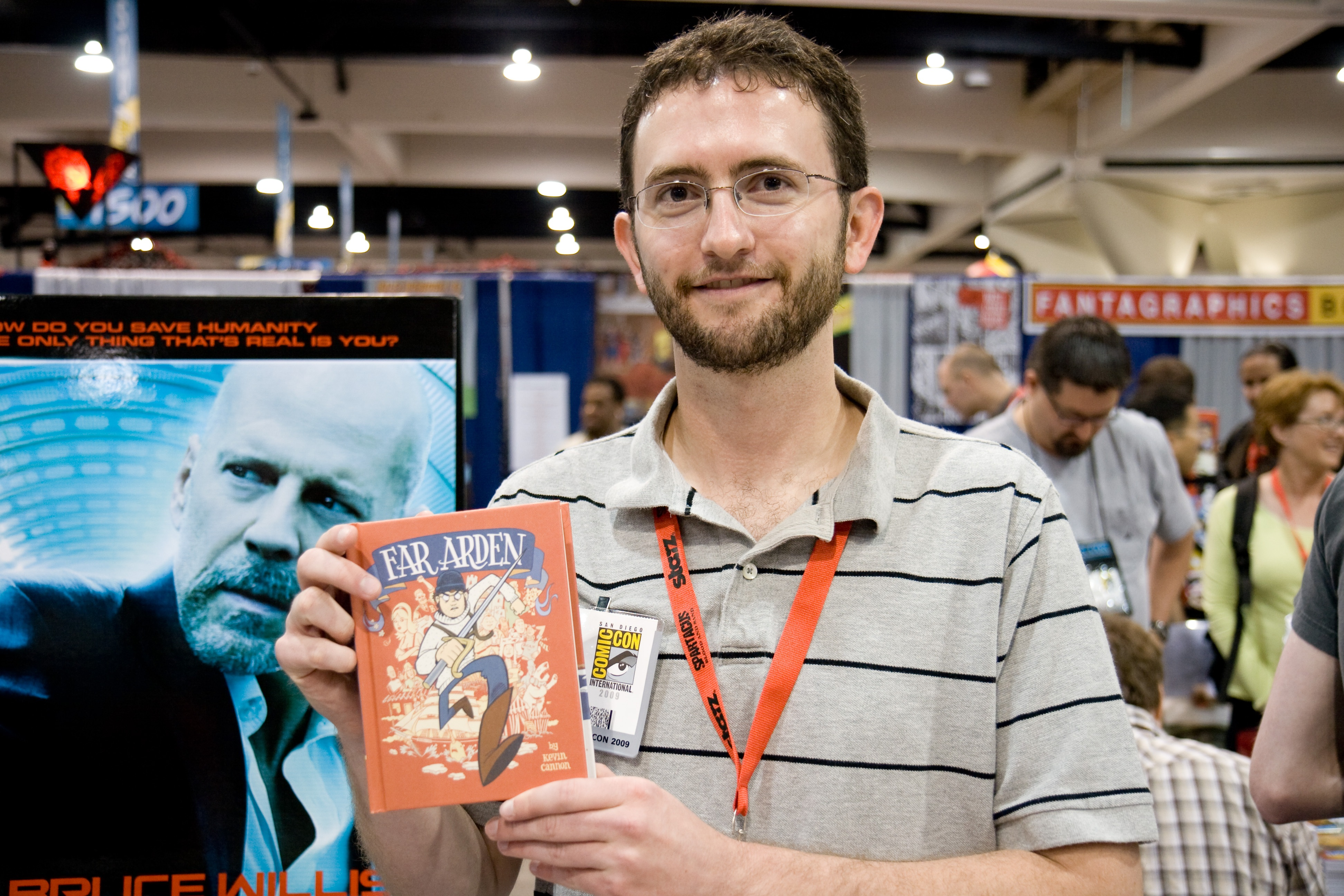
- Areas: Cartoonist, Writer, Artist

Kevin Cannon is an American cartoonist and illustrator.

== Life and career ==
Working on his own he has produced Far Arden, a graphic novel about a journey described in one review as "382 pages of entertaining, action packed and genuinely funny adventure".
