= Gaille Heidemann =

American actress

- Occupation: Voice actress
- Years active: 1975-present
- Spouse: Jack Roth

Gaille Heidemann is an American voice actress. She is known as the voice of Myriam the Mystic in Diablo III, Tempestra in Teenage Mutant Ninja Turtles, and has had guest starring roles in World of Warcraft (Warlords of Dreanor, Legion, Battle for Azeroth), Kung Fu Panda: Legends of Awesomeness, James Bond Jr., All Grown Up, Primetime Glick, The California Raisin Show, and Return to Castle Wolfenstein, among many others.

== Career ==
As a teenager she became a studio session singer, appearing on television and film soundtracks with The Jimmy Joyce Singers. She dubbed the singing voice for Patty Duke in Valley of the Dolls, and played the girl singer with co-stars Kim Milford and the rock band Moon in ABC's The Wide World of Mystery, produced by Don Kirshner. Her song "Hollywood Movie Girls" was recorded by Dusty Springfield and became the title and theme for the TV special Ann-Margret: Hollywood Movie Girls, for which she also wrote special material.

Heidemann's rock and roll impressions were featured on stage and film in Stars on 45 in Concert; Dream Street in Las Vegas, which won the Eppie Award for Best Show of the Year; and Forbidden Broadway in San Francisco. The Olsen twins performed nine of her songs in their musical party series, You're Invited To Mary-Kate and Ashley's Camp Out Party ("Raptor") and Ballet Party, including "Dancing Your Dreams", "Practice, Practice, Practice" and "Moonbounce Madness", all co-written with Adam Fields. She wrote, sang, produced and appears in "Obama Girl's Mama", the YouTube parody of the Obama Girl election videos directed by John Moffitt. Heidemann has voiced over a hundred commercials, including national campaigns for clients such as McDonald's, Coca-Cola, Toyota, and Goodyear Tires. Her interview is featured in Bill Filipiak's Voice Over Etiquette.

She co-wrote and produced Chuck & Di – the Tabloid Musical! for a standing-room-only run at the Long Beach Playhouse.

== Filmography ==
Year	Title	Role
2024	Batman: Caped Crusader (TV series)	Wilma
2018	World of Warcraft: Battle for Azeroth (video game)	Kisha
2016	Hearthstone: Mean Streets of Gadgetzan (video game)	Madam Goya
2016	World of Warcraft: Legion (video game)	Mrs. Caldron, Hyrja
2014	World of Warcraft: Warlords of Draenor (video game)	Ornekka
2014	Diablo III: Reaper of Souls (video game)	Myriam Jahzia, Mystic
2014	Kung Fu Panda: Legends of Awesomeness (TV series)	Madame Zhou (voice)
2012	Diablo III (video game)	Myriam Jahzia, Mystic (voice)
2004	World of Warcraft (video game)	
2003	Primetime Glick (TV series)	Martha Stewart, Granny
2002	Rocket Power (TV series)	Mrs. Dunkel
2001	Return to Castle Wolfenstein (video game)	Frau Von Buloh
1990–1993	Teenage Mutant Ninja Turtles (TV series)	Tempestra
1992	Batman: The Animated Series (TV series)	Matron
1991	James Bond Jr. (TV series)	Matron / Various
1990	New Kids on the Block (TV series)	
1989	The California Raisin Show (TV series)	Shirelle
1988	The Adventures of Raggedy Ann & Andy (TV series)	Mother
1975	The Wide World of Mystery (TV series) "Rock-a-Die Baby" "Song of the Succubus"	Gail
1975	Song of the Succubus (TV movie)	
