= Nightslayer =

Night-Slayer
- Night-Slayer from Detective Comics #544, artist Gene Colan.

Publication information
- Publisher: DC Comics
- First appearance: Detective Comics #529 (August 1983)
- Created by: Doug Moench (writer); Gene Colan (artist)

In-story information
- Full name: Anton Knight
- Species: Human
- Partnerships: Nocturna
- Notable aliases: Thief of Night, Night-Thief
- Abilities: Expert martial artist and burglar

Night-Slayer (Anton Knight) is a character in the DC Comics universe. He first appeared in Detective Comics #529 (August 1983), and was created by Doug Moench and Gene Colan.

== Fictional character biography ==
The son of Gotham City millionaire and crime lord Charles Knight, Anton Knight is raised in a life of luxury and privilege. As a youth, he yearns to improve himself, honing his body and mind to a sharp edge. He studies martial arts and eventually leaves home to study martial arts in Asia.

During Anton's travels, his father Charles is murdered by a rival gang. At Charles' funeral, Anton meets his adoptive sister Natalia Knight, who was raised in poverty separate from him. The long-separated siblings fall in love and begin a partnership. Natalia quickly becomes accustomed to the life of luxury Anton had always known, but the couple soon use up their inheritance, in no small part because Natalia needs expensive medical treatment due to having a rare disorder that makes her sensitive to light.

Natalia and Anton adopt a nocturnal existence to protect Natalia from the damaging rays of the sun, while continuing to use the expensive medical equipment to treat her skin sensitivity. After the inheritance money runs short, Anton and Natalia become burglars, following in their father's criminal footsteps. Clad in a black body suit, Anton uses his martial arts and acrobatic prowess to rob Gotham City's rich as the "Thief of Night", while Natalia operates behind the scenes as "Nocturna, Mistress of the Night".

After several clashes with Batman, Anton is eventually captured and sent to prison. Nocturna remains free and continues her life of crime along with a new ally, Nightshade. Anton finally escapes and, after being rejected by Nocturna, becomes the murderous "Night-Slayer".

In The New 52 continuity reboot, Night-Slayer is Nocturna's stepson.

== Powers and abilities ==
Night-Slayer is an expert martial artist.

== In other media ==
- Night-Slayer appears in Batman: The Video Game.
- A character loosely based on Night-Slayer named Anton Night appears in the Batman: Caped Crusader episode "Nocturne", voiced by Haley Joel Osment. He is an inventor and older brother of Natalia Night who showcases his inventions in a traveling carnival before she accidentally kills him during an argument.

== See also ==
- List of Batman family enemies
