= Batman: Caped Crusader =

American animated superhero series

- Genre: Superhero; Detective; Noir
- Based on: Characters from DC
- Developed by: Bruce Timm
- Showrunners: Bruce Timm; James Tucker
- Voices of: Hamish Linklater; Jason Watkins; Eric Morgan Stuart; Krystal Joy Brown; John DiMaggio; Gary Anthony Williams; Michelle C. Bonilla
- Music by: Frederik Wiedmann
- Country of origin: United States
- Original language: English
- No. of seasons: 2
- No. of episodes: 20

Production
- Executive producers: Bruce Timm; J. J. Abrams; Matt Reeves; Ed Brubaker; James Tucker; Daniel Pipski; Rachel Rusch Rich; Sam Register; Geoffrey Thorne; Sarah Geismer
- Editor: Marc Stone
- Running time: 24–26 minutes
- Production companies: Bad Robot; 6th & Idaho Motion Picture Company; DC Entertainment; Warner Bros. Animation; Amazon MGM Studios

Original release
- Network: Amazon Prime Video
- Release: August 1, 2024 – present

Related
- Batman: The Animated Series

Batman: Caped Crusader is an American adult animated superhero television series based on the DC Comics character Batman. The series is developed by Bruce Timm, and produced by J. J. Abrams's Bad Robot Productions, Matt Reeves, 6th & Idaho Motion Picture Company, DC Entertainment, Warner Bros. Animation, and Amazon MGM Studios. Originally announced in May 2021 for Cartoon Network and HBO Max, the series premiered on August 1, 2024, on Amazon Prime Video. A period piece set in the 1940s, Caped Crusader is a film noir-inspired reimagining of the Batman mythos, focusing on a young Bruce Wayne during the early stages of his crime-fighting career in Gotham City, drawing inspiration from Batman stories of the 1940s and 1960s.

Caped Crusader is often seen as a spiritual successor to Timm's Batman: The Animated Series. Unlike previous Batman-centered programming, Caped Crusader explores themes of corruption and crime in a stylized, period setting and has been noted for its serialized storytelling and deep psychological exploration of its characters. Critics have praised its mature tone and complex portrayal of the superhero, setting it apart from previous adaptations. A second season was announced in March 2023 and was released on July 31, 2026.

== Premise ==
Batman: Caped Crusader reimagines the Batman mythos with a focus on the detective noir aspects of the character. Set in a dark, foreboding Gotham City, inspired by Batman stories from the 1940s and 1960s, the series presents a young Bruce Wayne in the early stages of his crime-fighting career. It explores his struggle against the city's rampant corruption and crime, including a corrupt police force wanting to unmask and expose him as a fraud and a city riddled with gang warfare that involves Rupert Thorne. Much like many previous iterations, Batman: Caped Crusader emphasizes a grim, moody tone, with Batman often taking a back seat as other characters, including new interpretations of classic villains like Catwoman and Clayface, and allies like Barbara Gordon take on more prominent roles.

The series is noted for its serialized storytelling, focusing on episodic detective cases that build up to a larger narrative over the season. The show showcases a more grounded and less flamboyant take on its characters while integrating new and diverse spins on classic roles.

== Voice cast ==
=== Main ===
- Hamish Linklater as Bruce Wayne / Batman, a troubled socialite who secretly fights crime on the streets of Gotham City as a bat-themed vigilante.
  - Santino Barnard as Young Bruce Wayne
- Jason Watkins as Alfred Pennyworth, Bruce's loyal butler and assistant.
- Eric Morgan Stuart as James "Jim" Gordon, the commissioner of the Gotham City Police Department and a secret ally of Batman. Gordon is among the few members of the Gotham City Police department who is not corrupt. He is willing to look the other way in regards to Batman due to him believing Batman is out to help the city, and sees him as being capable of doing things that he himself cannot. In contrast to his comic book counterpart and other appearances in most media aside from Matt Reeves' film the Batman, Gordon is depicted as African American.
- Krystal Joy Brown as Barbara Gordon, Jim Gordon's daughter and a public defender whose brand of morality tends to clash with her father's. Barbara is initially wary of Batman, but begins to cooperate with him during the first season. Barbara eventually brings Batman and her father into more direct contact and alongside Montoya and Gordon, becomes a direct ally of Batman's within Gotham's legal system.
- John DiMaggio as Harvey Bullock, a corrupt police detective on the Thorne family's payroll with the goal of unmasking Batman and proving him be a fake. In the second season, Bullock is demoted in rank from detective to officer following the death of Harvey Dent and develops an antagonistic relationship with Carrie Kelly, though he is unwilling to significantly harm her as she is a child. DiMaggio reprises his role from Batman: Gotham by Gaslight.
- Gary Anthony Williams as Arnold Flass, a corrupt police detective on the Thorne family's payroll and Bullock's partner in the first season. When Bullock is reduced in rank in the second season, Flass is partnered with Renee Montoya by Gordon in hopes of keeping Flass under control. This version of Flass is depicted as an African American.
- Michelle C. Bonilla as Renee Montoya, a police detective who has her suspicions about Batman. She is among the few honest cops in the department, and has earned the trust of Commissioner Gordon. Montoya is lesbian and was briefly romantically involved with Harleen Quinzel in the first season and at some point between the two seasons took her in and harbored her at her apartment until the second season, when Quinzel turns herself in to keep her from being accused of aiding and abetting a fugitive. By the end of the second season, she has become an active ally of Batman and is among the few officers on the force who knows that Commissioner Gordon and Batman are working together.

=== Supporting ===
- Diedrich Bader as Harvey Dent / Two-Face (season 1), a smug district attorney and close friend of Bruce Wayne's who runs for the next mayor of Gotham City. After an acid attack melts half of Dent's face, he develops a more violent and nihilistic personality.
- Grey DeLisle as:
  - Lois Lane, a reporter for the Daily Planet. DeLisle reprises her role from Young Justice, Justice League: Doom, and various media in the Lego DC series.
  - Julie Madison (season 1), a woman whom Bruce Wayne dates at Harvey Dent's carnival.
  - Lily Gardner (season 2), the Riddler's girlfriend
- Cedric Yarbrough as:
  - Rupert Thorne, a cunning politician and crime boss. In season 2, Thorne is killed by the Joker.
  - Waylon Jones (season 1), a circus freak with reptilian features.
  - Linton Midnite, a voodoo shaman who gives Batman advice on how to defeat the Gentleman Ghost.
- Bumper Robinson as Lucius Fox, Bruce Wayne's lawyer.
- Yuri Lowenthal as Detective Eric Cohen
- Jamie Chung as Dr. Harleen Quinzel / Harley Quinn, a crazed psychiatrist who resents Gotham's elite and has a particular interest in Batman. She is a former friend of Barbara Gordon and developed a romantic attraction towards Renee Montoya in the first season. At some point between the two seasons, Harleen lived with Montoya in secret. When the Scarecrow begins subjecting students at Gotham University to his fear toxin, Quinzel begins to investigate the situation and briefly works with Batman to defeat him. Unwilling to put Montoya's career at risk, she turns herself in, keeping her time at Montoya's home a secret.
- Tom Kenny as:
  - Joe Rigger / Firebug (season 1), a pyromaniac who Bullock and Flass use to try and catch Batman.
  - Eel O'Brien, a photographer for the Gotham Gazette. Kenny reprises his role from Batman: The Brave and the Bold.
- Kimberly Brooks as Romy Chandler, a Gotham City Police Department detective
- Corey Burton as Jack Ryder
- William Salyers as Mayor Jessop, the mayor of Gotham City. In season 2, Jessop is killed by the Joker as part of his plan to destroy Gotham City.
- Roger Craig Smith as:
  - Jim Corrigan / The Spectre, a corrupt cop who planned on assassinating Barbara for a bounty whilst she and her father were being hunted down by Onomatopoeia.
  - Floyd Lawton (season 1), a mercenary
- James Arnold Taylor as Marcus Driver, a Gotham City Police Department detective
- Vincent Piazza as Tony Zito (season 1), one of Thorne's goons who was responsible for disfiguring Harvey Dent.
- Jason Marsden as Gorman (season 1), the personal assistant of Harvey Dent
- Ronan Raftery as Eddie Nygma / Riddler (season 2), a psychopath gangster and Rupert Thorne's lieutenant who "riddles" his victims with bullets. For his voice-over performance, Raftery did an impression of Dave Franco, who was supposed to reprise the role from Young Justice: The Animated Series, before Raftrey took his place.
- Laraine Newman as Hattie Tetch / Mad Hatter (season 2), a TV news gossip who is a gender-switched version of Jervis Tetch and vocally opposed to Batman. She is killed by the Joker as part of a plan to destroy Gotham City.
- John DiMaggio (season 1; "Savage Night") and Matthew Needham (season 2) as the Joker, a German-accented criminal with a clown-like appearance. This Joker is shown to be skilled in hand to hand combat and firearms. Unlike most incarnations of the character, this version is generally calm and rarely smiles or laughs. He is shown to have respect for Batman, referring to him as "brother" when they finally meet. DiMaggio reprised his role from Batman: Under the Red Hood, and various media in the Lego DC series for the first season. The character's visual look is directly inspired by German expressionism and Conrad Veidt’s portrayal of Gwynplaine in the 1928 silent film The Man Who Laughs, the same performance that originally inspired the Joker's creation in 1940. For his voice-over performance by Needham, the Joker's calm, cold, and restrained delivery was inspired by the chilling phone caller played by Tony Beckley in the 1979 horror film When a Stranger Calls.

=== Guest ===
- Minnie Driver as Oswalda Cobblepot / Penguin (season 1), a penguin-themed crime boss who is a gender-switched version of Oswald Cobblepot
- Paul Scheer as:
  - Aaron Cobblepot (season 1), the son of Oswalda Cobblepot.
  - Ronald Cobblepot (season 1), the son of Oswalda Cobblepot and brother of Aaron Cobblepot.
- Jeff Bennett as Jack Ellman (season 1), a man who becomes one of Clayface's victims
- Dan Donohue as Basil Karlo / Clayface (season 1), a talented but disgruntled actor who uses a genetics-altering serum to mold his face into different forms.
- Lacey Chabert as:
  - Yvonne Frances (season 1), an African-American actress
  - Vicki Vale (season 2), a photographer for the Gotham Gazette
  - Jane Overstreet (season 2), a student at Gotham University
- Alex Wyndham as Edmund Hayes (season 1)
- Christina Ricci as Selina Kyle / Catwoman (season 1), a sly cat burglar who is also infatuated with Batman and turned to crime when her rich father was arrested placing her in debt.
- Jackie Hoffman as Greta (season 1), Selina's maid.
- David Kaye as William Hastings (season 1), the assistant of Harley Quinn
- David Krumholtz as Fletcher Demming (season 1), a selfish man who was deluded into thinking he is reincarnated Egyptian royalty because of Harley Quinn's brainwashing treatment
- Jim Pirri as Emerson Collins (season 1), a man who is deluded into thinking he is a king because of Harley Quinn's brainwashing treatment
- Toby Stephens as:
  - Jim Craddock / Gentleman Ghost (season 1), a crooked aristocrat from the 1700s who steals from the middle class as a spectral apparition.
  - Russell Craddock (season 1), the great-great-great-grandnephew of Jim Craddock
- Gaille Heidemann as Wilma (season 1), an employee at the Gotham Public Library who helped Bruce identify the Craddock Coat of Arms and explained the history of James Craddock.
- Reid Scott as Onomatopoeia (season 1), an assassin from out of town who speaks in sound and action words, hence his name.
- Peter Jessop as Muller (season 1), a criminal who puts out a hit on Barbara Gordon.
- Mckenna Grace as Natalia Night / Nocturna (season 1), a girl with a condition that forces her to drain the essence of others
- Haley Joel Osment as Anton Night (season 1), the brother of Nocturna
- Donna Lynne Champlin as Leslie Thompkins (season 1), a doctor and orphanage proprietor who previously worked with Thomas Wayne
- SungWon Cho as:
  - Matt Milligan (season 1), a con artist with connections with Rupert Thorne
  - Carmine Broome (season 2), a student at Gotham University
  - Thomas Dalton (season 2), a student at Gotham University
- Juliet Donenfeld as Carrie Kelley / Crime Smasher, an orphanage resident
- Amari McCoy as Stephie Brown (season 1), an orphanage resident
- Carter Rockwood as Dickie (season 1), an orphanage resident
- Henry Witcher as Jason (season 1), an orphanage resident
- Josh Keaton as:
  - Matthew Thorne, the teenage son of Rupert Thorne
  - Peter Mitchell (season 1)
- Kari Wahlgren as Maggie Cain (season 1), a woman who knows Tony Zito
- Zach Lazar Hoffman as Mark "Dez" Desmond / Blockbuster (season 2)
- J.P. Karliak as Julian Gregory / Calendar Man (season 2), the accountant of Rupert Thorne
- James Urbaniak as Hugo Strange (season 2)
- Wunmi Mosaku as Roxanne Sutton / Roxy Rocket (season 2)
- Bruce Thomas as Warren Lawford (season 2)
- Todd Haberkorn as Armand Lydecker (season 2)
- Darien Sills-Evans as Gunther Hardwicke (season 2)
- Blythe Melin as Mad Monk (season 2)
- Darcy Yellin as Dala Landry (season 2)
- Josh Brener as Jonathan Crane Jr. / Scarecrow (season 2), a scarecrow-themed villain in a plague doctor mask and son of Jonathan Crane Sr. who specializes in fear
- Fryda Wolff as Rose Forrest / Thorn (season 2), a mysterious woman that Riddler meets. She is a composite character based on Rose Canton and Rose Forest.
- Kevin Michael Richardson as Mr. Zero (season 2), a large African-American man and self-proclaimed artist who talks through the use of a high-tech electrolarynx and uses liquid nitrogen in his "art".. His appearance is based on a disguise worn by Dr. Gogol of the 1935 horror film Mad Love.

Characters making non-speaking cameo appearances include Joe Chill, the mugger who shot Bruce's parents Thomas and Martha Wayne; Jimmy Olsen, a photographer for the Daily Planet; and Peter Merkel / Rag Doll.

== Episodes ==
Season	Episodes	Originally released
1	10	August 1, 2024
2	10	July 31, 2026

=== Season 1 (2024) ===
No. overall	No. in season	Title	Directed by	Written by	Original release date
1	1	"In Treacherous Waters"	Christina Sotta	Story by : Jase Ricci; Bruce Timm; Teleplay by : Jase Ricci	August 1, 2024
Oswalda Cobblepot, owner and singer of the Iceberg Lounge, has been making a name for herself in Gotham City's criminal underworld as the "Penguin" while trying to eliminate her mob boss rival Rupert Thorne by destroying his organization's warehouses. However, Thorne survives with help from a leak in her circle. Believing it is her youngest son Aaron, Oswalda has her enforcer Iggy kill him. However, her eldest son and the real source Ronald seeks out Gotham City Police Department (GCPD) Commissioner Jim Gordon for protection. With help from Jim's daughter Barbara Gordon and a mysterious vigilante called the "Batman", Ronald safely reaches the GCPD, but Oswalda launches a missile to destroy the police station. Unbeknownst to her, the station is evacuated before it is destroyed. Batman successfully captures Oswalda. He realizes later that in doing so, he left a power vacuum in Gotham's underworld for Thorne to fill. Batman tells his butler Alfred Pennyworth that he cannot fail again. Cast: Minnie Driver as Penguin / Oswalda Cobblepot, Jeff Bennett as Bill and Clarence, Grey DeLisle as Partygoer and Scared Woman, Paul Scheer as Aaron Cobblepot and Ronald Cobblepot, Cedric Yarbrough as Rupert Thorne and Judge
2	2	"...And Be a Villain"	Matt Peters	Greg Rucka	August 1, 2024
GCPD detective Renee Montoya is assigned to locate missing actress Yvonne Frances. Following a failed interrogation of Bruce Wayne, she investigates the film studio, where she learns Frances' fellow actor Basil Karlo may have been lying about his alibi. However, he is seemingly murdered before she can confirm. Upon further investigation, she learns Karlo was ashamed of his face, which led to him being typecast and Frances rejecting his advances. Ultimately, he used an experimental serum to make his face more malleable. Montoya and Batman eventually stumble across Karlo, who faked his death and kidnapped Frances out of a desire to play a villain for real. Montoya rescues Frances while Batman defeats Karlo who disappears before Montoya can apprehend him. Cast: Dan Donahue as Clayface / Basil Karlo, Jeff Bennett as Jack Ellman and Security Guard, Kimberly Brooks as Ramona and Secretary, Lacey Chabert as Yvonne Frances, Yuri Lowenthal as Darryl Manning and Stand-In, Bumper Robinson as Lucius Fox, Alex Wyndham as Edmund Haynes
3	3	"Kiss of the Catwoman"	Christopher Berkeley	Story by : Ed Brubaker; Bruce Timm; Teleplay by : Adamma Ebo; Adanne Ebo	August 1, 2024
At a museum displaying the Gotham elite's jewels, Bruce encounters a heiress named Selina Kyle, who has an interest in his late mother Martha Wayne's pearls. He is later ordered to attend a month of therapy with Dr. Harleen Quinzel after assaulting a patron who insulted his parents. Meanwhile, Kyle resorts to jewel theft after being left in debt adopting the "Catwoman" persona following the arrest of her father and the seizing of his company. After being caught and outed by Batman, Catwoman takes inspiration from him by upgrading her car and using gadgets before Gotham's District Attorney Harvey Dent bails her out, allowing her to resume her crime spree. Deducing Kyle will try and steal Martha's pearls, Bruce orders the museum to close early to lure in Catwoman, who is eventually caught once more after a brief chase and a literal catfight with Catwoman's pather "back-up". When Catwoman is shot by Flass and Bullock, Batman then immediately protects the shackled Catwoman and soundly defeats the corrupt detectives before they can murder Catwoman. Selina is ironically left destitute upon learning her maid Greta sold her belongings and refuses to bail her out as her way of Greta cutting her chances. Cast: Christina Ricci as Catwoman / Selina Kyle, Santino Barnard as Young Bruce Wayne, Jeff Bennett as Detective, Police Officer, and Reporter, Jamie Chung as Dr. Harleen Quinzel, Grey DeLisle as Newscaster and Radio Operator, Jackie Hoffman as Greta and Museum Director, Tom Kenny as Eel O'Brien and Doorman, Yuri Lowenthal as Detective Cohen
4	4	"The Night of the Hunters"	Christina Sotta	Ed Brubaker	August 1, 2024
After Mayor Jessop orders the creation of a task force to apprehend Batman, Gordon chooses Montoya to run it. Using Dr. Quinzel's insights, corrupt GCPD detectives Harvey Bullock and Arnold Flass use a masked criminal called Firebug as bait to lure out Batman. As part of their plan, they let Firebug go to start a fire. Batman arrives to rescue civilians, evading corrupt SWAT officers led by Bullock and Flass in the process. As Bullock and Flass kill Firebug to cover their tracks, Batman reluctantly works with Jim, who disapproves of the task force's methods, to save the remaining civilians. Afterward, Batman disappears once more, Bullock and Flass are hailed as heroes by Mayor Jessop, and put in charge of the Batman Task Force, with Jim narrowly keeping his job. Cast: Kimberly Brooks as Romy Chandler, Corey Burton as Jack Ryder and Police Radio, Jamie Chung as Dr. Harleen Quinzel, Tom Kenny as Eel O'Brien, Firebug / Joe Rigger, and Joplin, Yuri Lowenthal as Detective Fohen, William Salyers as Mayor Jessop, Roger Craig Smith as Jim Corrigan and Jones, James Arnold Taylor as Marcus Driver
5	5	"The Stress of Her Regard"	Matt Peters	Halley Gross	August 1, 2024
After several wealthy businessmen abruptly donate their fortunes to charity and go missing, Barbara suspects their physician and her friend, Dr. Quinzel, is involved. In reality, Quinzel has adopted the jester-like persona of Harley Quinn and is subjecting the businessmen to immense torture in an attempt to correct their minds. Barbara and Batman track her to the basement of one of her patients, where the latter is overpowered and knocked unconscious before the house is rigged to detonate. Nonetheless, Batman recovers and saves Barbara, though he fails to save Quinzel from falling to her apparent death. Having survived, Quinzel calls Montoya to call off a date they had planned and tell her that she is temporarily leaving Gotham. Cast: Jamie Chung as Harley Quinn / Dr. Harleen Quinzel, David Kaye as Clown Patient, Hastings, and Orderly #2, David Krumholtz as Fletcher Dremming, Jim Pirri as Emerson Collins and School Boy Patient
6	6	"Night Ride"	Christopher Berkeley	Marc Bernardin	August 1, 2024
When a mysterious ghost on horseback emerges to rob Gotham's working class, Dent's mayoral election campaign is threatened due to the robberies happening on his watch. He is offered a donation from Thorne, but is hesitant to accept it. Meanwhile, Batman struggles to fight the ghost directly. Deducing that it is the spirit of Jim Craddock, the gambling-addicted former owner of an old property that Bruce's friend Lucius Fox recently bought, he gains help from Linton Midnite, who advises him to sacrifice the old property's deed and the blood of a nobleman to draw out Craddock. Though Craddock possesses Alfred Pennyworth, Batman completes the ritual using Alfred's blood and traps Craddock in a vial. He subsequently gives it to Midnite while Dent accepts Thorne's donation. Cast: Bumper Robinson as Lucius Fox and Reporter #2, Cedric Yarbrough as Rupert Thorne and Linton Midnite, Toby Stephens as Gentleman Ghost and Russell Craddock, Gaille Heidemann as Wilma, Jason Marsden as Gorman and Reporter #1, Kari Wahlgren as Guard, Secretary, and Reporter #3
7	7	"Moving Target"	Christina Sotta	Adamma Ebo; Adanne Ebo	August 1, 2024
Jim fears that someone put a bounty on his head after assassins such as Floyd Lawton and Onomatopoeia come to Gotham and the former almost succeeds at killing him. He reluctantly agrees to be escorted to a safehouse at Wayne Gardens, but Onomatopoeia's group finds them. Meanwhile, Batman learns the hit was placed by a Blackgate Penitentiary inmate named Muller and follows Jim's detail. Narrowly fending off the assassins, Batman reveals to Jim while getting the contract cancelled, he discovered Barbara is the true target. Officer Jim Corrigan attempts to claim the bounty for himself, but is disarmed by Jim and arrested. Muller later reveals he ordered the hit because he feels he deserves better prison accommodations. Cast: Reid Scott as Onomatopoeia, Peter Jessop as Henchman #1 and Muller, Roger Craig Smith as Jim Corrigan, Hitman, and Henchman #2, James Arnold Taylor as Client and Marcus Driver
8	8	"Nocturne"	Matt Peters	Halley Gross	August 1, 2024
Amidst a fundraiser carnival for Dent's campaign, multiple orphans are reported missing. Batman soon finds the culprit, Natalia Night, the younger sister of inventor Anton Night who suffers from a mysterious ailment that can only be staved off by draining energy from people, which grants her enhanced strength. After falling out with and attacking Anton for his perceived controlling behavior, Natalia continues her attacks until she is intercepted by Batman. After making her realize she accidentally killed Anton, who begged Batman to stop her before he died, Batman takes Natalia to safety while her victims are taken to a hospital to recover. Meanwhile, Dent meets with Thorne to accept his donation, but refuses to accept his condition of dropping charges against Thorne's friend. In retaliation, Thorne's second-in-command Tony Zito throws a flask of acid at Dent's face. Cast: Jason Marsden as Gorman, Vincent Piazza as Tony Zito, Cedric Yarbrough as Judge, Rupert Thorne, and Waylon Jones, Mckenna Grace as Noctunra / Natalia Night, Donna Lynne Champlin as Leslie Thompkins, SungWon Cho as Matt Milligan and Morris, Grey DeLisle as Bearded Lady, Lois Lane and Julie Madison, Juliet Donenfeld as Carrie, Amari McCoy as Stephie, Haley Joel Osment as Anton Night, Carter Rockwood as Dickie, Henry Witcher as Jason; Note: Initially intended to be a two-part episode of Batman: The Animated Series, but was nixed by the Fox Kids censors due to themes of vampirism and concerns that an infection spread through blood would be too similar to the ongoing AIDS epidemic.
9	9	"The Killer Inside Me"	Christopher Berkeley	Jase Ricci	August 1, 2024
In the aftermath of his assault, Dent loses his mayoral bid and is left with half of his face permanently scarred which he grows insecure about. Bruce attempts to cheer him up with a night on the town, but a paranoid Dent has an outburst in a restaurant. Alfred scolds Bruce for his poor attempt at getting through to him. Craving justice against those who wronged him, Dent goes on a violent spree throughout Gotham taking out several of Thorne's men. Batman intervenes before he can hurt Thorne himself. Guilt-ridden, Dent snaps out of his rage and willingly goes to Arkham Asylum where he discovers Barbara signed on to become his lawyer. Cast: Kimberly Brooks as Waitress, Josh Keaton as Matthew Thorne, Vincent Piazza as Tony Zito, William Salyers as Emil Potter and Mayor Jessop, Kari Wahlgren as Maggie Cain, Cedric Yarbrough as Rupert Thorne
10	10	"Savage Night"	Christina Sotta	Ed Brubaker	August 1, 2024
Barbara explains to Dent that she is willing to help him, insisting that he was led astray. Meanwhile, Thorne's men, Bullock, and Flass seek revenge on Dent, prompting Barbara and Batman to establish a form of contact between each other and join forces with each other, Jim, and Montoya to protect him so he can testify in court. Amidst a fight at the docks however, Dent sacrifices himself to save Barbara from Flass. Batman loses his temper and threatens to shoot Flass, but ultimately spares him. Following this, Alfred assures Bruce that while he failed to reach Dent's humanity, Bruce still has his. After finishing a phone call, Thorne gets surprised by a Batarang thrown through his window as he sees Batman on one of the rooftops. Elsewhere, a mysterious man kills a series of victims with a toxin that makes them laugh uncontrollably and die with a smile with the latest victim becoming a success. Cast: Noshir Dalal as Back-Up Mobster and Guard, Bumper Robinson as Goon #2 and Mobster #1, James Arnold Taylor as Client, Cedric Yarbrough as Rupert Thorne

=== Season 2 (2026) ===
No. overall	No. in season	Title	Directed by	Written by	Original release date
11	1	"Brute Force"	Christina Sotta	Tyrone Finch & Bryce Abood	July 31, 2026
While an imprisoned Thorne awaits trial, pro-Thorne talk show host Hattie Tetch reveals that the case against Thorne rests on the testimony of his accountant, Julian Gregory. Thorne orders his unstable lieutenant, Eddie Nygma, to kill Gregory. Meanwhile, aware of a leak in the GCPD, Gordon assigns Montoya as Flass' new partner to investigate. Batman foils Nygma's initial attack on Gregory, prompting Nygma to visit Hugo Strange and acquire a toxin. He uses it on his lackey, Mark Desmond, turning him into a monster. Desmond attacks the safe house where Gregory is being kept, but Batman again intervenes to save him. An injured Gregory testifies, but Thorne's corrupt influence means the case is still dismissed. However, Thorne is later killed by the laughing toxin, administered by his driver. Meanwhile, Barbara forces Batman and Gordon to discuss working together. Cast: Ronan Raftery as Eddie Nygma / "Riddler", Grey DeLisle as Lily Gardner, Zach Lazar Hoffman as Mark Desmond, J. P. Karliak as Julian Gregory, Josh Keaton as Matthew Thorne and Peter Mitchell, Matthew Needham as "Chauffeur", Laraine Newman as Hattie Tetch, James Urbaniak as Hugo Strange, Cedric Yarbrough as Rupert Thorne
12	2	"Rocket's Red Glare"	Matt Peters	Geoffrey Thorne	July 31, 2026
After repeated attacks on Triad Industries, Batman goes undercover as Bruce to investigate. Triad, led by CEO Warren Lawford, head scientist Armand Lydecker, and security chief Gunther Hardwick, is about to launch Ultriam, a revolutionary fuel. However, Bruce learns that its inventor Dr. Roxanne Sutton died in a supposed accident. As Batman, he foils another attack and discovers the culprit is a still-alive Sutton. She is seeking revenge after Triad's leaders attempted to murder her when she wouldn't go along with their plan to sell Ultriam to foreign powers. Sutton attacks Triad's launch of a rocket fuelled by Ultriam. Batman initially tries to stop her, but then agrees to help when Hardwick attempts to kill them. Sutton flies up to the rocket and destroys the Ultriam fuel cell, sacrificing herself. The failed launch bankrupts Triad, while Lawford, Lydecker, and Hardwick are arrested for treason. Bruce destroys Sutton's research and launches a laboratory in her honor. Elsewhere in Gotham, the mystery figure behind Thorne's death kills Strange and steals the toxins which had turned Desmond into a monster. Cast: Wunmi Mosaku as Dr. Roxanne Sutton, Darien Sills-Evans as Gunther Hardwick, Todd Haberkorn as Armand Lydecker, Bumper Robinson as Lucius Fox, James Arnold Taylor as Sal, Bruce Thomas as Warren Lawford
13	3	"Deep Cover"	Christopher Berkeley	Tyrone Finch & Bryce Abood	July 31, 2026
With Thorne's whereabouts unknown, Nygma takes his place and unleashes a wave of terror across Gotham. A recovered Desmond refuses to testify against him, but a power-crazed Nygma still believes he's a snitch and orders his murder. Bruce goes undercover as convict Matches Malone in Blackgate to protect and question Desmond. He foils Nygma's hit and befriends Desmond. Enraged by the failure, Nygma orders repeated murder attempts. Bruce breaks them out of Blackgate and Desmond agrees to introduce Matches to Nygma. However, Nygma shoots Matches and a rueful Desmond leaves with him. Wounded, Batman interrupts their next robbery, but is unable to save Desmond from being shot by Nygma. As he dies, Desmond realizes Matches was Batman. Bruce regrets that he couldn't save Desmond or capture Nygma. Cast: Zach Lazar Hoffman as Mark Desmond, Ronan Raftery as Riddler, Jeff Bennett as Captain Beckett, Grey DeLisle as Lily Gardner, Roger Craig Smith as Vic
14	4	"The Devil's Due"	Matt Peters	Margaret Dunlap	July 31, 2026
A small-time robber is killed by someone posing as Batman, leading to him being labelled a murderer by the press. Hattie Tetch invites Gordon onto her show to question him about the situation. Batman learns the murder was committed by a cult led by the Mad Monk, which worships the bat-themed deity Barbatos and sees Batman as Barbatos's avatar. Batman goes to Linton Midnite for information, and Midnite warns him that the cult will resort to human sacrifices to raise Barbatos. Gordon and Tetch are kidnapped by the cult with help from Tetch's producer Dala, a secret priestess for the cult. Batman rescues the pair and defeats the Mad Monk, who reveals he never believed in Barbatos and started the cult to exploit people for power and money. Dala overhears this and kills him. Tetch publicly praises Gordon for his role in their rescue and gives him full credit while chastising the Batman as the mysterious figure is watching from his victim's TV. Cast: Bumper Robinson as Lucius Fox and Cultist, Blythe Melin as Mad Monk, Tom Kenny as Eel O'Brien, Laraine Newman as Hattie Tetch, Cedric Yarbrough as Linton Midnite, Darcy Yellin as Dala Landry
15	5	"The Spectral Hand"	Christina Sotta	J. M. DeMatteis	July 31, 2026
Barbara struggles with PTSD following Jim Corrigan's attempt to kill her. Corrigan, imprisoned for life, agrees to an experimental life longevity experiment in exchange for a reduced sentence. The experiment goes wrong and Corrigan dies on the operating table. News of his death sparks a prison riot that Batman quickly ends. While being transported to the morgue, Corrigan suddenly revives as a vengeful zombie-like creature and escapes. He starts a killing spree, targeting criminals Vinnie de Leone, Roger Marshall and Freddy Borke, all of whom he previously arrested but were let go due to lack of evidence. Batman warns Barbara that Corrigan is coming for her next. However, when Corrigan arrives at Barbara's home, he asks for her forgiveness instead before dying. A distraught Barbara resolves to her father that she will get better. Cast: Roger Craig Smith as Jim Corrigan, Corey Burton as Houseman Welch, SungWon Cho as Dr. Peterson, Grey DeLisle as Scared Woman, Robin Atkin Downes as Freddy Borke and Roger Marshall
16	6	"Sudden Fear"	Christopher Berkeley	Julie Benson & Shawna Benson	July 31, 2026
A string of deaths is occurring on the campus of Gotham University. All the victims were fearful and screaming about things that were not there before their deaths. Montoya returns to her apartment where Harleen Quinzel has been in hiding since her apparent death. Harleen sees Montoya's case files about the university victims and donnes her Harley Quinn costume to investigate. While at the morgue, Quinn is attacked by a man in a plague mask, but she is saved by Batman. The two agree to work together and realize the masked man is Jonathan Crane Jr., the son of Jonathan Crane Sr. and former colleague of Quinzel who is testing a gas that causes extreme fear in people. Crane attacks a large bonfire ceremony at the university and manages to use the gas on Batman, but Batman overcomes his fears and stops Crane. With Crane stopped, Quinzel turns herself in to the GCPD. Cast: Jamie Chung as Harley Quinn, Josh Brener as Scarecrow, Lacey Chabert as Jane Overstreet and Vicki Vale, SungWon Cho as Carmine Broome and Thomas Dalton, Robin Atkin Downes as Professor Burton
17	7	"Her Dark Reflection"	Christina Sotta	Margaret Dunlap	July 31, 2026
The Riddler guns down Phil Forrest, a florist and ex-cop, in front of Phil's daughter Rose at their floral shop. Rose suffers a mental breakdown and the alternate personality Thorn emerges. Thorn approaches the Riddler at his club about joining his criminal empire, which he agrees to. The two spend several nights committing a string of robberies leading to a confrontation with Batman. Thorn incapacitates Batman with the Riddler tying up Batman in a car and pushing it off a cliff. Batman survives and tracks down the Riddler and Thorn to the club, but the two manage to escape. Thorn takes the Riddler back to the Forrest's flower shop and reveals that she emerged within Rose after Phil's death before gunning down the Riddler. Batman later finds the Riddler's body. With the Riddler dead, the mysterious figure approaches his remaining men and tells them they will now work for him. Cast: Ronan Raftery as Riddler, Fryda Wolff as Rose / Thorn, Artt Butler as Phil Forrest and Bruno, Grey DeLisle as Lily Gardner, Tom Kenny as Eel O'Brien, Matthew Needham as Joker
18	8	"Zero Hour"	Matt Peters	Julie Benson & Shawna Benson	July 31, 2026
Carrie Kelley is an orphan girl who lives with her adoptive parents. Inspired by Batman, Kelley patrols her neighborhood nightly as "Crime Smasher" (styled after the Gray Ghost). Carrie's bike is ran over by an ice delivery van and tracks it down to a warehouse. Carrie is stopped outside the warehouse by Batman where he forces her to go home. Batman goes inside, but is trapped by Mr. Zero who makes ice sculptures out of human bodies and cleans up dead bodies for the city's criminals. After a confrontation with Bullock, Carrie returns to the warehouse and frees Batman. The two stop Mr. Zero with Carrie rushing back home while Batman interrogates Mr. Zero about Rupert Thorne's disappearance after Thorne's car was found at the bottom of a lake and his frozen body in the warehouse. Before Mr. Zero can answer, he is assassinated by an unknown figure. Cast: Juliet Donenfeld as Carrie Kelley, Kevin Michael Richardson as Mr. Zero and Dad, Maria Canals-Barrera as Mom, Bumper Robinson as Henchman D and Gotham Citizen, James Arnold Taylor as Henchman E and Dispatcher
19	9	"Dead Before Dawn"	Christopher Berkeley	Greg Rucka	July 31, 2026
While hosting her nightly show, Hattie Tetch begins to laugh hysterically as her production team is gunned down by the Riddler's former men. The mysterious man steps in front of the camera and says that Mayor Jessop will be dead by midnight. Gordon enacts a citywide curfew and assigns Jessop a 24-hour protection consisting of Montoya and Flass, but Jessop dismisses Montoya. Barbara examines Hattie's body along with other corpses that have a large grin with her, Gordon, and Batman realizing that the mysterious man has been plotting from the shadows for months. Batman infiltrates the Riddler's old club, but finds all of the henchmen have been poisoned with the mysterious man having already fled. Flass takes Jessop to a massage parlor / brothel instead of a GCPD safehouse. Batman tracks Jessop down to the massage parlor. As the clock begins to strike midnight, the mayor begins to laugh uncontrollably before dying. At the GCPD medical examiner's office, the grinning corpses start to rise, releasing a gas into the room. At the Bat Cave, Thorne's corpse rises and releases the same gas, infecting Alfred with uncontrollable laughter. Cast: Matthew Needham as Joker, Laraine Newman as Hattie Tetch, William Salyers as Mayor Jessop
20	10	"The Laughing Death"	Matt Peters	Geoffrey Thorne	July 31, 2026
The gas causes Alfred to grow in size and gain strength. After a brief struggle, Batman manages to subdue Alfred. At the GCPD, the infected medical examiner and cops, including Bullock, rampage through the police station, spreading the infection while killing others. Montoya and Barbara find Gordon, with the three barricading themselves in the commissioner's office. The infected leave the police station and begin to terrorize the city as Gordon realizes he is infected and begins to turn, but Barbara and Montoya manage to lock him in a cell. A recovered Alfred works on an antidote while Batman goes to confront the mysterious man, who calls himself the Joker. Alfred arrives over the city in a biplane to deliver the cure as the fight between Batman and the Joker continues. Batman is severely injured during the fight, but causes a falling pole to impale the Joker before he can flee. The Joker falls off the building, disappearing into the mist below. The following morning, Bullock and Flass recuperate in the hospital. With the body of the Joker not being found, Batman, Gordon, Montoya, and Barbara ensure each other that Gotham will rebuild. Cast: Matthew Needham as Joker, Grey DeLisle as Reporter A and Scared Woman, Yuri Lowenthal as Cohen and Reporter B

== Production ==
=== Development ===
Warner Bros. Animation approached longtime DC Comics producer Bruce Timm with the idea of producing a revival of Batman: The Animated Series (1992–1995) set after the events of The New Batman Adventures (1997–1999), but Timm refused to develop a Batman show that was a continuation to The Animated Series, as if he were to revive a DC Animated Universe (DCAU) show, that would be Justice League (2001–2004) due to his feelings more could have been done there, but Warner wasn't interested in reviving that show. However, after a discussion with James Tucker regarding the offer, Timm recalled several ideas he had for The Animated Series that he was unable to do due to the target audience, particularly having "more of a pulp, serial, mystery, film noir" depiction of the character, inspiring him to develop a new series based on those ideas. Timm, who decided to work with Tucker on the new series, was later informed by Warner Bros. Animation that J. J. Abrams and The Batman director Matt Reeves were interested to work with him on a new show, after which Timm pitched them his ideas for the new series, which impressed Reeves and Abrams, who decided to work on the series.

In May 2021, it was announced that a new Batman animated series developed by Reeves, Abrams, and Timm, titled Batman: Caped Crusader, would premiere on Cartoon Network and HBO Max. Timm serves as showrunner on the series, with the first season consisting of ten episodes. In January 2022, comic book author Ed Brubaker has been announced to be serving as head writer and executive producer for the series; Brubaker agreed to work on the series due to his love for Batman: The Animated Series, and originally approached Timm to work on the show as a freelance writer, thinking the writers' room was already hired. Timm instead hired him as head writer. Additional executive producers include Tucker, Daniel Pipski, Rachel Rusch Rich, and Sam Register.

In August 2022, it was reported that the series would no longer be moving forward on HBO Max as part of the service's original programming, but would continue production while being shopped to another network, with Apple TV+, Hulu, and Netflix reportedly interested in the series. In September 2022, the series officially began being shopped around to networks with Netflix, Amazon Prime Video, and Apple TV+ being the big contenders. In March 2023, it was announced that Amazon would serve as the new distributor of the series and had renewed it for a second season. Brubaker was unable to return for season 2 due to the 2023 Writers Guild of America strike and scheduling issues; Geoffrey Thorne took over as head writer for the season. In May 2025, Tucker was mentioned as serving as showrunner for the season, alongside Timm.

=== Writing ===
The writing process for season one began in 2022. The series features contributions from writers such as Greg Rucka, Marc Bernardin, Halley Gross, Jase Ricci, Adamma Ebo and Adanne Ebo, with Sean Lee serving as a writer's assistant. Rucka specifically wrote the second episode. In June 2024, J. M. DeMatteis revealed he had written an episode for the show's second season. Reeves, Abrams, and Timm described the series as "continuing the Batman mythology" with Warner Bros. Animation and Cartoon Network Studios president Sam Register saying it will follow the "groundbreaking legacy" of Timm's Batman: The Animated Series, aiming to re-shape the audience perception of the Batman mythologies in a similar vein to The Animated Series. All the executive producers called the series "thrilling, cinematic and evocative of Batman's noir roots while diving deeper into the psychology of these iconic characters".

The series is a period piece set in the 1940s, which was decided by the producers as a way to distinguish Caped Crusader from The Animated Series. The writers used both films and Batman comics released during that period as an influence on character portrayals and design, particularly regarding Catwoman and Clayface. The series draws particular inspiration from noir films, with Tucker being a fan of the genre and wanting to implement it to the series to create an interpretation of the character that hasn't been done in animation.

Brubaker said the series would have a more adult tone while still catering towards a young audience, comparing its rating to Star Wars and the Marvel Cinematic Universe (MCU), with the series focusing on solving murder mysteries and Batman's self-destructive tendencies. This was reaffirmed during the 2023 Annecy Film Festival by Warner Bros. Animation vice-president Peter Girardi, who noted the series would target an older audience, which gave Timm more creative freedom than The Animated Series, where he had to discard ideas due to censorship. Timm noted some elements of the series were recycled from plans he discarded from The Animated Series, such as depicting "this emotionally messed-up version of Batman, who's extremely aloof and almost inhuman". For the Joker, Tucker noted that their "continental and international" take on him, who has been everywhere like in Europe causing havoc as a wild card, was inspired on German expressionist cinema, namely Conrad Veidt's performances in The Man Who Laughs (1928) and The Cabinet of Dr. Caligari (1920), as they looked for everything that made film noir.

=== Casting ===
In August 2022, Diedrich Bader accidentally revealed he did voice work for the series. In June 2024, the voice cast were revealed with Hamish Linklater announced to be voicing Batman and Bader to be voicing Two-Face. Despite never had any voice acting experience in the past, Linklater wanted an opportunity to portray Batman at some capacity. Having watched previous Batman-centered animated shows prior, Linklater looked to the character's longtime voice actor Kevin Conroy as an influence. The following month, John DiMaggio was revealed to be reprising his role as Harvey Bullock from the animated film Batman: Gotham by Gaslight (2018), while Minnie Driver was revealed to be voicing a gender-bent version of the Penguin with the character being renamed as Oswalda Cobblepot.

In June 2026, Laraine Newman was revealed to be voicing a gender-bent version of the Mad Hatter with the character being renamed as Hattie Tetch and Wunmi Mosaku voicing Roxy Rocket the following month. At San Diego Comic Con 2026, Matthew Needham was revealed to be voicing the Joker. A huge fan of The Animated Series, Needham kept his casting a secret for too long but saw the role as an incredibly daunting one due to feeling that he had to live up to Mark Hamill's shadow until he realized that if he measured himself to past voices, he would be too scared to try anything, plus the show's version of the Joker is different from the one from the source material and faces a much different Batman, with Needham guiding himself with Linklater's performance from the booth.

=== Animation and post-production ===
Animation services were provided by Studio IAM and Studio Grida. James Tucker returns from previous DC animated media as a character designer. Post-production for the series began in January 2024, with early cuts for some episodes having already been developed by that point. The character design for Batman was inspired by his 1930s comics design, which artists used as a "starting point" for a more stylized take to differentiate his appearance from his design in previous media.

== Marketing ==
The anticipation for Batman: Caped Crusader kicked off with an official announcement on May 19, 2021, featuring a noir-inspired poster of Batman that set a dark and atmospheric tone for the series. During the DC FanDome 2021 panel on October 16, creators Bruce Timm, J.J. Abrams, and Matt Reeves presented concept art and discussed the show's direction, emphasizing its unique animation style and thematic depth, although no video clips were shared. May 2024 Entertainment Weekly published an exclusive first look, unveiling several images that highlighted the series' distinctive art style and character designs, including a fresh take on classic villains and allies.

The promotional campaign for Batman: Caped Crusader unfolded gradually, with a variety of clips and images released to build anticipation. Throughout 2024 and leading up to August 2024, several promotional images were revealed, showcasing key characters, villains, and settings that highlighted the series' artistic direction and emotional depth. These visuals reinforced the show's commitment to its dark and moody aesthetic, aiming to bring a noir-inspired take on the Batman mythos while appealing to both new viewers and long-time fans.

== Release ==
An early animation reel for the series was shown during the 2023 Annecy International Animation Film Festival. Batman: Caped Crusader was originally set to release on HBO Max and Cartoon Network as part of its ACME Night slate. The series was later acquired by Amazon Prime Video and premiered on August 1, 2024. The second season was slated to be released in 2025; however, it was delayed and later released on July 31, 2026.

== Reception ==
=== Viewership ===
According to Whip Media, which tracks viewership data for the 25 million worldwide users of its TV Time app, Batman: Caped Crusader was the most anticipated new series of March 2024.

=== Critical response ===
Critical response of Batman: Caped Crusader
Season	Rotten Tomatoes	Metacritic
1	94% (71 reviews)	74 (22 reviews)
2	92% (26 reviews)	77 (5 reviews)

The first season of Batman: Caped Crusader has a 94% approval rating on Rotten Tomatoes, based on 71 critic reviews, with an average of rated reviews of 7.7/10. The website's critics consensus reads, "Marking Bruce Timm's long-awaited return to the Batman mythos, Caped Crusader is a hard-boiled and retro treat for fans of the Dark Knight's previous animated adventures". On Metacritic, the season received a score of 74 out of 100 based on 22 critics, indicating "generally favorable" reviews.

The first season has received a varied response from critics, many of whom commend its noir-inspired roots, with Graeme Virtue of The Guardian noted its effective incorporation of noir elements within the familiar Batman mythos. Critics also highlighted the storytelling, with Josh Bell of The Inlander finding it engaging, and Joe George of Den of Geek viewing it as a promising start with classic potential. Craig Mathieson of The Age praised the series for presenting fresh narratives, while Erin Maxwell of LA Weekly applauded its deep exploration of the character's history, effectively balancing heritage with modern retconning. Ross McIndoe of Slant Magazine noted its hard-edged crime narrative within a kid-friendly framework.

Darker, period-specific details were also noted, with Bill Goodykoontz of the Arizona Republic enjoying these aspects. Joshua M. Patton from CBR appreciated Batman's return to his detective roots, while Nick Schager from the Daily Beast characterized it as a stylish throwback. Zaki Hasan from the San Francisco Chronicle deemed it a successful reinvention of the character. Johnny Loftus of Decider enjoyed the moody animation and compelling villains, although he noted some narrative imbalance. Ben Travers from IndieWire suggested the series could appeal to both casual viewers and die-hard fans, potentially attracting a new generation.

Some critics celebrate the show as a fresh, engaging series with strong potential, while also noting some areas for improvement in originality like, Bradley Russell of GamesRader regarded it as a tremendous first effort with great potential for future seasons. Alan Sepinwall of Rolling Stone found it enjoyable but not particularly groundbreaking. Kambole Campbell of Empire viewed it as a renewal rather than a simple retread of previous series. Erik Adams of IGN Movies found it captivating, focusing on engaging whodunits rather than operatic origin stories. Reuben Baron of Looper found it engaging but lacking the "wow" factor of earlier iterations, while Elijah Gonzalez of Paste Magazine appreciated its successful blend of various Batman eras. Michael Thomas of Collider felt it struggled to carve out its own identity but marked a solid return to form. Witney Seibold of Slashfilm considered it the best Batman media in a decade. Roxana Hadadi from Vulture offered a fresh perspective, stating that the series takes foundational aspects of the noir genre—paranoia, conspiracy, and dramatic chiaroscuro visuals—and gives them a spin recognizable to Batman fans while remaining accessible to newcomers.

In contrast, some critics were less favorable. Zach Rabiroff of Polygon argued that the show is "a slightly smarter, slightly slower, but much less interesting version of Timm’s ’90s masterpiece." Further voices in the critique included Jarrod Jones of AV Club, who described it as a moody and thrilling journey through Gotham City, while Angie Han of Hollywood Reporter felt it was steady but rarely spectacular. Gavia Baker-Whitelaw from TV Guide found it well-executed yet conventional, while Hoai-Tran Bui of Inverse identified it as ambitious, with some lulls but overall engaging.

The second season has a 92% approval rating on Rotten Tomatoes, based on 26 critic reviews, with an average of rated reviews of 7.8/10. On Metacritic, the season received a score of 77 out of 100 based on 5 critics, indicating "generally favorable" reviews.

=== Accolades ===
Year	Award	Category	Recipient(s)	Result	Ref.
2025	Critics' Choice Television Awards	Best Animated Series	Batman: Caped Crusader	Nominated	
2025	Saturn Awards	Best Animated Television Series or Special	Batman: Caped Crusader	Nominated	

== Other media ==
A multiplayer adventure detective game titled Batman: Caped Crusader - Chronicles was made available on Amazon Luna on July 31, 2026. It includes characters not featured in the series such as Babyface, Tweedledum and Tweedledee, Dollmaker, Lynx, and Music Meister.

Harley’s uniform from the series appears as an alternate skin in Lego Batman: Legacy of the Dark Knight’s Mayhem Mode.

== See also ==
- List of television series based on DC Comics publications
