= Hearthstone expansions =

An example of gameplay in Hearthstone. Players use cards from their hand to interact with the game board.

Hearthstone is a digital collectible card game released by Blizzard Entertainment in 2014, available for Microsoft Windows and macOS PCs and iOS and Android smartphones. The game is free-to-play, with players gaining in-game currency and card packs via winning matches and completing quests, while real-world money can be spent to acquire additional card packs and cosmetic items. The game has been critically well-received and financially successful, estimated in August 2017 to earn nearly US$40 million per month. As of November 2018, Blizzard has reported more than 100 million Hearthstone players. Blizzard has continued to expand the game with the addition of multiple expansions, adventures and game modes, which adds new cards and mechanics to the game.

== Background ==
Blizzard has expanded Hearthstone roughly three times a year by the addition of expansions and adventures. Most expansions present more than 100 new cards to Hearthstone developed around a theme or gameplay concept; once released, players can purchase or win card packs with cards from the available expansions to add to their library. With the "Darkmoon Races", a mini-set expansion that builds upon prior expansions featuring a smaller number of cards was also introduced. Mini-sets are typically released in the half-way point between the release of two full expansions. Adventures used to be prevalent additions among expansions, but have been phased out in favor of mini-sets. The last adventure "Galakrond's Awakening" was released in January 2020. Adventures represent fewer new cards like mini-sets, typically a few dozens, which are only gained by winning specially designed matches against computer opponents in the single-player mode. Access to an adventure requires payment with in-game gold or real-world money. All adventures have multiple "wings" that could be completed. Later, Blizzard moved away from Adventures as they found that because Adventures gated the set's cards until the challenges were completed, these cards did not readily enter the meta-game, and when they did, they would be used more by expert players who could easily complete the Adventures' challenges compared to amateur players. Blizzard recognized that players do enjoy the single-player narrative events and have worked in quests and missions around the new card sets for those players.

Since the "Year of the Mammoth", which began with Journey to Un'Goro in 2017, there were no future more adventure card set releases. Instead, the game included freely-available single-player missions, similar to those in adventures, to earn card packs from that expansion. However, in the "Year of the Dragon", starting in April 2019, there were additional single-player modes with paid content, separate from expansion pack releases. While structured similar to Adventures, there were several "wings" to process through, the approach was closer to the "Kobolds & Catacombs" Monster Hunt or "The Witchwood" Dungeon Run in that players made choices related to their hero and deck over the course of several battles through each wing. Rewards from these single-player modes were card packs from the associated expansion by completing individual battles, so one could possibly earn more new cards by completing the single-player modes than by simply buying new packs directly.

Starting in January 2021, the Madness at the Darkmoon Faire set and subsequent sets have included a mini-set of 35 cards that expanded that set. Mini-sets are considered to be a part of their parent expansion, and mini-set cards can be opened from the same card packs as their preceding expansion.

In the "Year of the Mammoth", Standard moved some Classic cards to the "Hall of Fame" set that is not playable in Standard but the cards still can be obtained and are available to play in Wild format. In the "Year of the Raven", three additional Classic cards were moved to the "Hall of Fame" set. In 2021, Blizzard introduced an annually rotating Core set that can be used in Standard and Wild modes. The first iteration of the set consisted of 235 cards: 31 new ones and 204 selected from various non-Standard sets. The Core set is free to use for all players that completed the game's tutorial. With the introduction of the Core set, the Basic, Classic, and Hall of Fame sets were grouped into a Legacy set confined to the Wild mode. Alongside the Core set, Classic mode was introduced where only the original 2014 versions of cards from the old Classic set can be used.

As of August 2022, there have been 21 expansions, five mini-sets, and six adventures that include collectible cards.

Collectible cards breakdown
Set name (abbreviation)	Release type	Release date	Removal date from Standard	Total	Common	Rare	Epic	Legendary
Removed sets
Basic	None	March 11, 2014	March 30, 2021 into Legacy	143	Rarity is free			
Classic	None	March 11, 2014	March 30, 2021 into Legacy	240	94	79	36	31
Reward	Special	March 11, 2014	April 6, 2017 into HoF	4	0	0	1	3
Hall of Fame (HoF) (Note: The Hall of Fame set consisted of cards that were rotated out of Standard, mostly taken from the Classic set. The Hall of Fame set was retired in the Year of Gryphon and the cards went back to their original sets.)	Removed Sets	HoF released in April 6, 2017; March 30, 2021 into Legacy		33	7	7	6	10
None
Legacy	Removed Sets	March 30, 2021 (Note: Legacy is technically a representation name of two separate sets, coded as LEGACY and EXPERT1. LEGACY is a custom-made set consisting of various former cards (e.g. Basic and Reward cards), and it was constructed on March 30, 2021. EXPERT1 simply contains all cards that were originally in the Classic set on March 11, 2014. It represents the set that used to be called "Classic".)		467	112	114	46	52
Caverns of Time	Removed Sets & Expansion	September 1, 2023		147	54	45	23	25
Event	Special	February 13, 2024	—N/a	8	0	0	6	2
Year 1 & 2 (2015)
Curse of Naxxramas (Naxx)	Adventure	July 22, 2014	April 26, 2016	30	18	4	2	6
Goblins vs Gnomes (GvG)	Expansion	December 8, 2014	April 26, 2016	123	40	37	26	20
Blackrock Mountain (BRM)	Adventure	April 2, 2015	April 6, 2017	31	15	11	0	5
The Grand Tournament (TGT)	Expansion	August 24, 2015	April 6, 2017	132	49	36	27	20
League of Explorers (LoE)	Adventure	November 12, 2015	April 6, 2017	45	25	13	2	5
Year of the Kraken (2016)
Whispers of the Old Gods (WOG)	Expansion	April 26, 2016	April 12, 2018	134	50	36	27	21
One Night in Karazhan (Kara, ONIK)	Adventure	August 11, 2016	April 12, 2018	45	27	12	1	5
Mean Streets of Gadgetzan (MSG)	Expansion	December 1, 2016	April 12, 2018	132	49	36	27	20
Year of the Mammoth (2017)
Journey to Un'Goro (Un'goro)	Expansion	April 6, 2017	April 9, 2019	135	49	36	27	23
Knights of the Frozen Throne (KFT)	Expansion	August 10, 2017	April 9, 2019	135	49	36	27	23
Kobolds & Catacombs (KnC)	Expansion	December 7, 2017	April 9, 2019	135	49	36	27	23
Year of the Raven (2018)
The Witchwood (WW)	Expansion	April 12, 2018	April 7, 2020	135	49	36	27	23
The Boomsday Project (Boomsday)	Expansion	August 7, 2018	April 7, 2020	136	49	36	27	24
Rastakhan's Rumble (Rumble, RR)	Expansion	December 4, 2018	April 7, 2020	135	49	36	27	23
Year of the Dragon (2019)
Rise of Shadows (RoS)	Expansion	April 9, 2019	March 30, 2021	136	49	37	26	24
Saviors of Uldum (SoU)	Expansion	August 6, 2019	March 30, 2021	135	49	36	27	23
Descent of Dragons (DoD)	Expansion	December 10, 2019	March 30, 2021	140	49	36	27	28
Galakrond's Awakening (GA)	Adventure	January 21, 2020	March 30, 2021	35	15	12	4	4
Demon Hunter Initiate (DHI)	Adventure	April 2, 2020	March 30, 2021	20	8	6	4	2
Year of the Phoenix (2020)
Ashes of Outland (AoO)	Expansion	April 7, 2020	April 12, 2022	135	52	35	23	25
Scholomance Academy (SA)	Expansion	August 6, 2020	April 12, 2022	135	52	35	23	25
Madness at the Darkmoon Faire (DMF) with Darkmoon Races (DR)	Expansion	November 17, 2020	April 12, 2022	170	70	46	25	29
Year of the Gryphon (2021)
Core 2021 (Core)	Core	March 30, 2021	April 12, 2022	235	128	55	27	25
Forged in the Barrens (FitB) with Wailing Caverns (WC)	Expansion	March 30, 2021	April 11, 2023	170	66	49	26	29
United in Stormwind (UiS) with Deadmines (DM)	Expansion	August 3, 2021	April 11, 2023	170	66	49	26	29
Fractured in Alterac Valley (FAV) with Onyxia's Lair (OL)	Expansion	December 7, 2021	April 11, 2023	170	66	49	26	29
Year of the Hydra (2022)
Core 2022 (Core)	Core	April 12, 2022	April 11, 2023	250	130	55	29	36
Voyage to the Sunken City (VSC) with Throne of the Tides (ToT)	Expansion	April 12, 2022	March 19, 2024	170	66	49	26	29
Murder at Castle Nathria (MCN) with Maw and Disorder (M&D)	Expansion	August 2, 2022	March 19, 2024	170	66	49	26	29
Path of Arthas (PoA)	Special	December 7, 2022	March 19, 2024	26	12	8	3	3
March of the Lich King (MLK) with Return to Naxxramas (RtN)	Expansion	December 7, 2022	March 19, 2024	183	69	55	28	31
Year of the Wolf (2023)
Core 2023 (Core)	Core	April 11, 2023	March 19, 2024	283	155	58	29	41
Festival of Legends (FoL) with Audiopocalypse (Aud)	Expansion	April 11, 2023	March 26, 2025	183	69	55	28	31
Titans (TTN) with Fall of Ulduar (FoU)	Expansion	August 1, 2023	March 26, 2025	183	69	55	28	31
Showdown in the Badlands (SitB) with Delve into Deepholm (DiD)	Expansion	November 14, 2023	March 26, 2025	183	70	54	28	31
Year of the Pegasus (2024)
Core 2024 (Core)	Core	March 19, 2024	March 26, 2025	288	143	65	40	40
Whizbang's Workshop (WW) with Dr. Booms Incredible Inventions (DBII)	Expansion	March 19, 2024	March 17, 2026	183	69	55	28	31
Perils in Paradise (PiP) with The Traveling Travel Agency (TTA)	Expansion	July 23, 2024	March 17, 2026	183	69	55	28	31
The Great Dark Beyond (GDB) with Heroes of Starcraft (SC)	Expansion	November 5, 2024	March 17, 2026	194	77	58	28	31
Year of the Raptor (2025)
Core 2025 (Core)	Core	March 25, 2025	March 17, 2026	288	143	65	40	40
Into the Emerald Dream (TED) with Embers of the World Tree (EWT)	Expansion	March 25, 2025	TBA 2027	183	69	54	29	31
The Lost City of Un'Goro (TLC) with the Day of Rebirth (DoR)	Expansion	July 9, 2025	TBA 2027	183	69	55	28	31
Across the Timeways (AtT) with Echoes of the Infinite (Eotl)	Expansion	November 5, 2025	TBA 2027	183	69	55	28	31
Year of the scarab (2026)
Core 2026 (Core)	Core	March 17, 2026	TBA 2027	288	152	58	37	41
CATACLYSM (CATC) with Restoration of Azeroth (RoA)	Expansion	March 17, 2026	TBA 2028	164	51	46	36	31
Escape from Violet Hold with Azeroth's Most Wanted	Expansion	July 6, 2026	TBA 2028	164	51	46	36	31
All unique released cards: 6191 (Includes 143 free cards) As of 2026-05-10 (through Whizbang's Workshop)					2321	1712	1001	1014

=== Basic, Classic, Reward, Hall of Fame, and Core ===
Prior to the removal of these sets, all new players to Hearthstone acquired over 130 cards in the Basic card set to start playing with so they have enough cards to assemble decks for each of the ten classes. The Classic card set was generally class-specific cards that were not associated with any expansion and card parks could always be purchased in the game's store or won as rewards. Basic and Classic cards were playable in both Standard and Wild formats, and were not rotated out of Standard play from Hearthstone's launch until March 2021, as with cards from other expansions. Over time, some cards were retired to a separate Hall of Fame, taking them out of Standard play format but remaining available for Wild play and being obtained by crafting. Any class-specific Classic cards retired in this manner were eventually replaced with new Classic cards for that class to prevent class card-count imbalances.

At the start of "Year of the Dragon" in April 2019, two legendaries from The Witchwood set that powers up the hero power, Genn Greymane and Baku the Mooneater, as well as four cards that synergize with those cards, were moved to the Hall of Fame so those cards left the Standard set a year earlier than normal. Prior to the year moniker system, the Reward set consisted of four cards that could only be obtained by completing meta-game achievements in Hearthstone, such as by collecting at least one copy of every "murloc" card in the Basic and Classic sets.

In March 2021, the Basic, Classic and Hall of Fame sets were removed, and cards from those sets were combined into the Legacy set, which can be only used in Wild. The base set of Hearthstone changed from being composed of the Basic and Classic sets to a new set, called Core. The Core set typically features over 200 cards at a time, and includes cards from the Legacy set and other expansions, and it is immediately unlocked for free for all players.

At the same time as the removal of the Classic set, a new format with the same name was added. In the Classic format, players get to play the game as it existed in June 2014.

=== Curse of Naxxramas ===
The adventure "Curse of Naxxramas" was announced on April 11, 2014, and then was released on July 22. It includes 15 bosses and nine class challenges that together award 30 cards, which includes six legendaries, and an exclusive card back if all heroic bosses are defeated. "Curse of Naxxramas" was developed to focus on a specific gameplay mechanic, with the team settling onto exploring the design space around the "deathrattle" keyword. This led to the narrative of the player having to explore a location filled with ghosts and undead creatures to take advantage of deathrattle effects. Since it was a single-player adventure, the team also developed bosses that would be far different from typical human opponents, including some boss characters that would break the fundamental rules of the game. Lead artist Ben Thompson said that they made it felt like winning against these bosses was something that the player earned, as well as helping the player to learn new tricks they could use in regular play modes.

=== Goblins vs Gnomes ===
The expansion Goblins vs Gnomes, was announced at BlizzCon on November 7, 2014, and then it was released on December 8. The expansion includes 123 cards found in its specific card pack. Pricing for the packs are the same as Classic packs. "Goblins vs Gnomes" was the first large expansion, and rather than roll out cards as they did with Curse of Naxxramas, they felt their goal with this "was ‘let's make a bunch of cards that will really go in and just blow up the meta all at once,’ and we'll see how it goes, and maybe that'll affect how we do things in the future," according to Chu. A central theme was designed around the "Mech" tribe cards that would interact with cards that represent goblins and gnomes.

=== Blackrock Mountain ===
The adventure "Blackrock Mountain" was announced at Pax East on March 6, 2015, and the first wing was released on April 2; the other four wings were opened weekly thereafter. It includes 17 bosses and nine class challenges that together awards 31 cards, which includes five Legendary cards, and an exclusive card back if all heroic bosses are defeated. "Blackrock Mountain" was designed as to help support players that wanted to construct dragon-themed decks. Dragon cards in Hearthstone are generally expensive to cast and thus only appear in the latter part of a match, making such decks weaker in the opening rounds. With "Blackrock Mountain", the team introduced cards that interacted with dragon cards, such as by having special effects when a minion is summoned while having a dragon card in hand.

=== The Grand Tournament ===
The expansion The Grand Tournament was announced on July 22, 2015, and was released on August 24; the set includes 132 cards found in its specific card pack, which costs the same as previous card packs. The Grand Tournament was developed with a new card mechanic for minions called "Joust" which has combat between a minion with Joust with other minions based on the casting cost of the minions, rather than their attack and health. Donais noted that while this also created a central theme for The Grand Tournament expansion, it also served to help combat "aggro" decks—decks filled with low-cost minions that could be quickly deployed—which at the time of the expansion's release, were extremely popular and found to be discouraging to many players. The Grand Tournament also introduced the "Inspire" mechanic for minions, which would create some effect for the minion each time the player used their Hero power, often including cumulative effects over several turns. Donais said the Inspire keyword came about looking at how to interact with Hero powers better, and while Inspire-based cards could be slow and at risk, could have great payoffs if used properly.

=== League of Explorers ===
The adventure League of Explorers was announced at BlizzCon 2015 on November 6, 2015, and the first wing was released on November 12; the other three wings were opened weekly with a week-long break after the second wing. It includes 13 bosses and nine class challenges that together awards 45 cards, which includes five legendaries, and an exclusive card back if all heroic bosses are defeated. League of Explorers was the team's first attempt to craft a narrative that allowed Hearthstone to stand on its own from the Warcraft universe even though it may still borrow concepts from it from time to time. The adventure borrows from dungeons in desert locations within World of Warcraft but transform the experience to be one of an adventuring archaeologist, and the challenges were more themed around puzzles and traps that the dungeons would present rather than just boss characters. Central to League of Explorers was the new "Discover" mechanic, which when activated would have the game randomly select up to three cards with specific characteristics from all available game cards, allowing them to select one card to put into their hand. This mechanic was introduced to provide contrast to decks that focused on card draws, which they found out tend to be played in the same manner over time. The Discover mechanic allowed decks to be more random but provide some player decision for on-the-spot judgement calls depending on the situation.

=== Whispers of the Old Gods ===
The expansion Whispers of the Old Gods was announced on March 11, 2016, and was released on April 26; the set includes 134 cards found in its specific card pack, which costs the same as previous card packs. Whispers of the Old Gods was based on creating a theme around mysterious and dark Lovecraftian horror, such as Cthulhu, to contrast to the high adventure and excitement that they had designed with "League of Explorers". This concept of crafting powerful god-like characters let them brainstorm on wild ideas for cards that may seem overpowered for the game but that would fit the theme. Central to the expansion is the Legendary "C'Thun" Old God card, which can be buffed by effects from 16 other cards, disciples of C'Thun, that were part of the expansion, regardless of where the C'Thun card was currently at. Donais explained this helped to create a "sense of dread" in opponents that fit the theme they wanted. Because of this, all players received the C'Thun card and one of the disciple cards for free once the expansion was released. "Whispers" also allowed the designers to take old favorite cards and make "corrupted" versions of them within the flavor of the theme.

=== One Night in Karazhan ===
The adventure "One Night in Karazhan" was announced on July 29, 2016, and the first wing was released on August 11; the other three wings were opened weekly thereafter. There are four wings along with a free prologue mission that awards two cards. Kara includes 13 bosses and nine class challenges that together awards 45 cards, which includes five legendaries, and an exclusive card back if all heroic bosses are defeated. "One Night in Karazhan" is based on a popular game location in World of Warcraft, featuring an abandoned mage's tower that is often used for a dungeon raid. The adventure features eleven boss characters that are also in the World of Warcraft raid of the tower. The team had designed the concept of this expansion alongside "Curse of Naxxramas" early in Hearthstone's post-release and was considered to be their first adventure, but they ultimately used Naxxramas, as Karazhan was being used for other activities by teams within Blizzard at that time. Instead, when they looked towards designing it, they found Priest decks had difficulty in staying current with the meta-game, so several of the cards introduced with this set were to help make the Priest a more viable class with the shifts in popular decks.

=== Mean Streets of Gadgetzan ===
The expansion Mean Streets of Gadgetzan was announced at BlizzCon 2016 on November 4, 2016, and was released on December 1; the set includes 132 cards found in its specific card pack. Mean Streets of Gadgetzan was originally envisioned to have the spirit of "cops and robbers", according to designer Matt Place and art director Ben Thompson, but the idea transformed into squarely focusing on the crime aspects, and treating the narrative as three principal mafia-like crime families vying for control of the city of Gadgetzan along with a number of small-time criminals that work as hired hands. The nine hero archetypes were divided into sets of three that each worked for a different family, which led to the creation of tri-class specific cards. Each of the three families was given a central mechanic theme: the Grimy Goons buff cards that are in a player's hand, the Jade Lotus improve new Jade Golem cards the more they are played, and the Kabal use Discover cards to use certain cards from outside a player's deck. The set includes Legendary cards that represent the leader of each family.

=== Journey to Un'Goro ===
The expansion Journey to Un'Goro was announced on February 27, 2017, and was released on April 6; it contains 135 cards found in its specific card pack. Journey to Un'Goro is based around a pre-historic theme and introduces dinosaurs and the Elemental tribe, including retroactively making some previously released minions as part of the tribe. It introduces Legendary spells with the "Quest" keyword, which award a unique minion or spell when the conditions of the quest are fulfilled. If a Quest card is in the player's deck it will be put into the player's opening hand, although players are allowed to mulligan it, and it must be put into play before the player can start completion of that quest. The expansion also adds the "Adapt" keyword to some minions and spells, which allows the player to select a buff to apply to one or more minions.

=== Knights of the Frozen Throne ===
The expansion Knights of the Frozen Throne was announced on July 6, 2017, and was released on August 10. The set's theme is about the frozen wastes of Northrend and Icecrown Citadel, and the set features the game's heroes embracing the power of the Undead Scourge, becoming Death Knights in the service of the Lich King. The expansion features the introduction of hero cards, an entirely new card type that transforms the player's hero and hero power along with varying unique effects, and the Lifesteal mechanic. It features 135 cards and includes adventure-like missions for single-players, featuring a narrative leading to a boss fight with the Lich King that can reward one random Legendary death knight card, multiple card packs and for dedicated players an alternate hero for Paladin - Arthas. The expansion introduced the Lifesteal keyword; when minions or spells with this keyword deal damage the controlling hero is healed by the same amount.

=== Kobolds & Catacombs ===
The expansion Kobolds & Catacombs was announced in November 2017 during BlizzCon 2017 and was released on December 7, 2017. The general concept of the expansion was around the idea of dungeon crawls from role-playing games. Its 135 cards are themed around exploring old catacombs under Azeroth and uncovering valuable treasures. Among the cards include Legendary weapons for each class that includes classes that have never had weapons before, Spellstone cards that require the player to achieve certain objectives in-game to upgrade the card, "Unidentified" item cards that offer a random effect alongside a known effect, and cards with a "Recruit" keyword that allow the player to summon minions directly from their deck that meet the card's requirements. All players received the Legendary minion Marin the Fox a month ahead of time and after the set was released, one random Legendary weapon card. Earlier in 2017, Blizzard had planned for this set's theme to be around Warcraft's Blingtron robots and would have been known as "Blingtron's Lootapolooza". While this theme still centered around dungeons and loot, they decided that the set would have better flavor and easier art to design by switching the theme to kobolds; however, this decision came after they started some of the promotional material, so some of the art includes Blingtrons.

The expansion introduces a new single-player mode called a "Dungeon Run", a roguelike-style format. The goal for the player is to complete battles against eight boss characters randomly selected from a pool of 48 that become more progressively difficult. The player starts by selecting a class, which gains them a small deck of cards for that class. For each boss they defeat, the player gains additional starting health in the next battle, a choice of three sets of three randomly selected cards around a theme, and in some cases, a unique treasure card otherwise not available in the normal game modes. Should the player be defeated by a boss, that run is ended, and the player must start a run anew. Cards from the Dungeon Run do not become part of the player's library, though players can earn card packs through quests involving Dungeon Runs, and can earn a unique card back by completing runs with all nine classes. The idea for the Dungeon Run is based on the expansion's theme and the mode works as an optional single-player experience independent of the card collection of the player.

=== The Witchwood ===
The Witchwood was announced in March 2018 as the first expansion in the Year of the Raven and was released on April 12, 2018. It is themed around a spooky forest next to the cursed city of Gilneas from Warcraft. The expansion adds two new keywords; "Echo" cards can be played as many times on a turn as long as the player has the mana to pay the cost, while minions with "Rush" can immediately attack the opponent's minions on the turn they are summoned. The set also features cards that give a special effect if a player's deck only contains even-cost cards or odd-cost cards, effectively limiting players to only half of their card collection in assembling decks to take advantage of these cards.

The expansion adds a single-player mode called "Monster Hunt", an evolved version of Kobolds & Catacombs's "Dungeon Run", which became available to play two weeks after the expansion was released. In the "Monster Hunt", players pick between four unique heroes that have a unique hero power and unique cards. After defeating each encounter, players pick between three sets of cards to improve their deck and occasionally earn special cards or an ability to improve their hero power; there are over 45 encounters. Players can earn a unique card back, which requires defeating eight bosses of increasing difficulty, with each of the four heroes, and then defeating the final boss, Hagatha the Witch.

=== The Boomsday Project ===
The Boomsday Project was announced in July 2018 and was released on August 7, 2018. The set focuses on "Mech" characters and abilities, similar to Goblins & Gnomes, and is themed around the minion Dr. Boom that was introduced in the former set, having set up a villainous laboratory in the Netherstorm. The set introduced the new "Magnetic" keyword, which allows a player to use a card as a buff if the "magnetic" card is played to the left of a mech, and as a stand-alone minion otherwise. The Magnetic mechanic had originally been designed as "Modular", whereby playing a card would either allow the player to select from two effects: playing it as a spell atop a mech or as its own minion. The developers found this could lead to long turns if a player's deck primarily consisted of such cards, to the point they had been ready to cut the keyword and release the set otherwise. However, they found a solution through the user interface by letting the player make the choice at the same time as playing the card if they placed it in a specific location near a mech. The Boomsday Project is also the first expansion to have legendary spell cards for each class.

In June 2019, a number of cards from The Boomsday Project received buffs, such as increasing the strength or health of minions or reduce the casting cost of various cards. This is the first major buff to cards since the game's release in 2014. In addition, a new neutral Legendary minion card was added to the set and a golden copy of it was given free to all players for a limited time.

The set also includes a single player mode called the Puzzle Lab, which presents more than 100 Hearthstone-based puzzles where players are given a pre-determined game state and must attempt to complete a given objective. The puzzles are split among these four different objectives: Lethal, where players must win the match during their turn; Mirror, which requires the player to match the minion battlefield on both sides; Board Clear, where the battlefield must be cleared of minions; and Survival, requiring the player to survive until the next turn. The Puzzle Lab was released two weeks after the expansion's release. Players who complete all the Puzzle Lab missions will be rewarded with a card back.

=== Rastakhan's Rumble ===
The Rastakhan's Rumble was announced during Blizzcon 2018 and was released on December 4, 2018. The expansion is centered around nine troll teams coming to battle in an arena to gain favor with their animal spirits known as "Loa" and King Rastakhan, the ruler of the ancient Zandalari Empire. Each troll team represents one of the nine classes in the game, and in addition to other cards, each class will get a Legendary minion card representing the Loa, and a Spirit card that has synergy with the class's Loa card. A new keyword "Overkill" triggers an effect if more damage is done than needed to eliminate an opposing minion. A new solo mode, Rumble Run, will also be available with this expansion that follows the story of a young troll combatant seeking glory in the arena.

=== Rise of Shadows ===
Rise of Shadows was announced in February 2019 before being formally revealed for its April 9, 2019, release as the first expansion in the Year of the Dragon. Rise is themed around numerous villains from previous expansions gathering to form the League of E.V.I.L.: Arch-Thief Rafaam (League of Explorers), Madam Lazul (Whispers of the Old Gods), King Togwaggle (Kobolds & Catacombs), Hagatha the Witch (The Witchwood), and Dr. Boom (The Boomsday Project) and then pulling off a heist in Dalaran. Cards from this expansion will have mechanics that are similar to the past expansions. New card keywords include scheme, spells that increases its effectiveness after each turn that it remains in a player's hand, twinspell, spells that leaves a copy of itself in a player's hand after using it for the first time, and lackeys, a specific set of minions that are generated by other cards that are 1/1 in power with a differing battlecry.

Rise of Shadows includes a solo adventure mode called "The Dalaran Heist", formatted similar to the Monster Hunt and Dungeon Run, though it requires the player to pay for four of the five chapters with in-game gold or with real money; it was released on May 16, 2019. At the start of a run in a chapter, the player selects one of nine minions, which align with the game's standard classes, and fights through eight bosses of increasing difficulty, gaining rewards and additional cards to fill their deck. A new feature includes points during this ascension where the player can do a small bit of deck manipulation, such as removing a card, adding a card, or adding a bonus boost to a card in the next match it is played. Completing certain achievements within the challenge can unlock alternate class powers or different starting decks. Completing a chapter's boss successfully grants Rise card packs, and completing all five chapters gives additional bonus rewards including card backs.

=== Saviors of Uldum ===
Saviors of Uldum was announced on July 1, 2019, released on August 6. Thematically it follows after events of Rise of Shadows, where Rafaam and the League of E.V.I.L. have stolen the floating city of Dalaran and have moved it to the Uldum desert. The expansion also links to the previous League of Explorers, with the main four heroes from that expansion poised to battle Rafaam and his allies. Among new additions include cards with keywords "Reborn" that bring back dead minions but with one health and "Plague" spells that affect all minions on the battlefield equally. Legendary Quest Cards, last used in Journey to Un'Goro, were reintroduced for each of the nine classes.

The single-player campaign, called Tombs of Terror, was released on September 17, 2019. Tombs of Terror has five chapters, each requiring the player to pay for three (first and final ones are free) of the five chapters with in-game gold or with real money. Each chapter ends with a final boss with additional health compared to regular bosses except the final boss's health is persistent between attempts. Beating all four of these bosses unlocks the final chapter. Players play with dual-class heroes so they can use cards from two classes. Defeating five bosses in each chapter awards three Saviors of Uldum packs and completing all chapters awards a golden classic pack and card back.

=== Descent of Dragons ===
Descent of Dragons was announced at BlizzCon 2019 and was released on December 10, 2019. The expansion features the keyword Invoke that when played will use the Galakrond hero power and power up the Galakrond card in a player's deck, as well as Side Quests that are easier to complete when compared to the legendary quests. The expansion includes a solo adventure, the fifth one released, called "Galakrond's Awakening" that was first released on January 21, 2020; it features separate stories of the League of E.V.I.L. and the League of Explorers facing off until they reach a final showdown and it includes an additional 35 cards and two card backs (if the heroic mode is defeated) for players to collect.

=== Demon Hunter Initiate ===
Demon Hunter Initiate was a set released on April 2, 2020, shortly before the release of Ashes of Outland. This set is made entirely of demon hunter cards in order assist with card parity with existing classes since it was the first new class added to the game since the original release in 2014. Once the Initiate set rotated out of standard in 2021, the development team added some of the rotating demon hunter cards to the Classic set.

=== Ashes of Outland ===
Ashes of Outland was announced on March 17, 2020, and was released on April 7, 2020 as the first expansion of the Year of the Phoenix.

This expansion introduced the first new hero class in the game's history, the Demon Hunter, bringing the total number of playable classes to ten. The Demon Hunter's base hero power, Demon Claws, costs one mana to use, and grants the player's hero +1 Attack for that turn.

The new expansion also introduced the Outcast keyword, which is exclusive to Demon Hunter class cards. Outcast cards gain special effects if they are the leftmost or rightmost card in a player's current hand. Since players cannot change the order in which cards are displayed in their hand, this mechanic requires players to take note of the cards in their hand to make use of these special effects.

In addition, the set's release included a rework of the Priest class's basic and classic set. Some of its original cards were replaced with new ones, providing the class with lower-mana support which it had lacked previously, leading to Priest players struggling against other classes. Some of the Priest cards which did not fit the class identity were also moved to the Hall of Fame .

=== Scholomance Academy ===
Scholomance was released on August 6, 2020. The set includes dual-class cards, similar to the three-class concept introduced in “Mean Streets” but limited to two classes. A new mechanic for minions was introduced called Spellburst, it triggers an effect just once after playing a spell. Each class has a Study Spell, letting players Discover a card of a certain type, as well as reducing the mana cost of the next card of the type discovered.

=== Madness at the Darkmoon Faire ===
Madness at the Darkmoon Faire was released on November 17, 2020. The set features cards inspired by the World of Warcraft monthly event known as the Darkmoon Faire and also includes the return of the Old Gods in new versions; these Gods were last seen in the Whispers set. The set includes a new keyword called Corrupt where if a player plays a card of higher cost while a Corrupt card is in hand, the card becomes corrupted which activates bonus effects.

Darkmoon Races' is Hearthstone's first mini-set and it builds upon the Madness at the Darkmoon Faire expansion, featuring 35 new cards and was released on January 21, 2021. While the cards can be obtained through the Madness card packs, it is the first set of cards in which players can purchase the complete set (including duplicates of each non-Legendary card) in one purchase from Blizzard.

=== Core 2021 ===
At the start of "Year of Gryphon" on March 30, 2021, all players were immediately able to use all 235 cards within the Core set for free. This set replaced the Classic and Basic sets that were previously used in Standard mode. It includes 30 new cards and the remaining consists of cards selected from Basic, Classic, various Wild sets, and the Demon Hunter Initiate set. The core set is planned to change each year.

=== Forged at the Barrens ===
The first expansion of the "Year of the Gryphon" was Forged at the Barrens which was released on March 30, 2021. A new keyword "Frenzy" was added for abilities that minions evoke should they take and survive any form of damage. Additionally, cards that generate direct magic effects have now had those magic effects classified into one of six schools, such as Fire or Nature, with which Blizzard plans to build upon in the future expansions. Ten of the cards are designed as Legendary Mercenaries, which have a single-player content, known as the Book of Mercenaries, focused on them. The set was expanded when the second mini-set Wailing Caverns was released on June 3, 2021.

=== United in Stormwind ===
The second expansion of the "Year of the Gryphon" was United in Stormwind which was released on August 3, 2021. This set introduces two new keywords: "Tradeable" which are cards that can be played as normal or put back into the deck in order to draw another card and "Questline" cards that are three-part quests that after each part is completed gives a reward and if all three are completed a specific Legendary minion card is given. The set was expanded with the third mini-set called the "Deadmines" that was released on November 2, 2021.

=== Fractured in Alterac Valley ===
The third and final expansion of the "Year of the Gryphon" was Fractured in Alterac Valley which was on December 7, 2021. This set features the nine Mercenaries available as Hero Cards and the new keyword is Honorable Kill which gives a beneficial effect if destroying a minion with exact damage. The set release tasks the player with earning honor points by playing games and the faction winner, which was Alliance, awarded all players the diamond version of their faction's leader in February 2022. The set was expanded with the fourth mini-set called "Onyxia's Lair" which was released on February 15, 2022.

=== Core 2022 ===
At the start of "Year of Hydra" on April 12, 2022, all players will be immediately able to use any of the 250 cards within the Core set for free; this is the second version of the core set. At the start of the Year of Hydra, 57 cards will rotate that were in the Core 2021 set, while 72 cards replace those for Standard mode play. These 57 cards were part of previous sets and will still be able to play in Wild mode. Core sets are available to be used in any game mode.

=== Voyage to the Sunken City ===
The first expansion of the "Year of the Hydra", Voyage to the Sunken City was announced on March 17, 2022, and was released on April 12. The theme of this expansion is Zin-Azshari, an ancient city of elves that sank into the oceans of Azeroth. The elves survived by transforming themselves into undersea creatures called Naga. This set features a new minion archetype, the Naga. It also introduced Colossal minions, which are minions that summon additional body parts when summoned to the field. Each body part counts as a minion, and may have a special ability of its own. The set was expanded with the fifth mini-set called "Throne of the Tides" which was released on June 1, 2022.

=== Murder at Castle Nathria ===
The second expansion of the "Year of the Hydra", Murder at Castle Nathria was announced on June 27, 2022, and was released on August 2.

This expansion is themed around the venthyr (vampires in the World of Warcraft franchise), and their ruler, Sire Denathrius. Accused of causing a drought of life energy within the Shadowlands, Denathrius hosts a gathering at his home, Castle Nathria, to clear the air. However, when he is killed, the detective Murloc Holmes and his assistant Watfin are called upon to solve the mystery.

This expansion introduces 135 new cards, including ten suspects as legendary minions. It introduces a new keyword, Infuse, and a new card type, Locations.

Cards with the infuse mechanic become more powerful, when a certain number of friendly minions have died while the card is in its owner's hand. For example, the epic minion Sire Denathrius has the battlecry ability, allowing him to deal 5 damage among enemies when brought into play, and has "Endlessly Infuse (2)". This allows Denathrius to deal 1 more damage among enemies, every time two friendly minions on its owner's side die.

Locations are played on the battlefield for an initial cost, and have a set amount of durability which represents the number of times it can be used. The location's ability can be used for free by its controller, and it has a cooldown of one turn.

This set was expanded upon with the sixth mini-set, "Maw and Disorder", released on September 27, 2022. It included 35 new cards, and takes place in "The Maw", a prison within the Shadowlands.

=== Path of Arthas ===
With the introduction of the Death Knight class, the second new hero added to the original game will get 26 cards from the "Path of Arthas" set, which can be either purchased from a money offer or by spending 2000 Gold. In addition to the 26 cards from this set, 32 cards are added to the Core Set that will be freely given after finishing Death Knight Prologue.

=== March of the Lich King ===
The third and final expansion of the "Year of the Hydra", March of the Lich King was announced on November 1, 2022, and was released on December 6.

This expansion introduces a new hero class, the Death Knight, bringing the total number of playable heroes to 11. Its basic hero power is the Ghoul Charge, which costs two mana to use. It summons a Frail Ghoul with 1 Attack, 1 Health, and Charge, which dies at the end of the turn it is summoned. Death Knights also gain access to Corpses, a class-specific secondary resource. Corpses are gained when a friendly minion dies, and they may be spent to unlock powerful effects. Death Knight players may choose between a combination of three rune types—Blood, Frost, and Unholy—each with different mechanics that affect how players may build their deck.

This expansion also introduces a new minion archetype, Undead, and dual-type minions. They may count as either one of their archetypes when working in tandem with other cards. March of the Lich King also permanently brings back the Reborn mechanic from the "Saviors of Uldum" expansion, which resurrects a friendly minion with 1 Health the first time it dies.

Finally, the expansion also adds a new mechanic, Manathirst. These cards gain additional effects when the player controls the amount of mana specified on the card. The cards effects only consider permanent mana crystals for their activation, and only activate when played from the player's hand. For example, the Warrior spell "Last Stand" has Manathirst 7. It allows the player to draw a Taunt minion from their deck, and doubles the drawn minion's stats if the player has seven mana crystals.

=== Festival of Legends ===
The first expansion of the "Year of the Wolf", Festival of Legends was announced on March 14, 2023, and was released on April 11, 2023.

This expansion is themed around a music festival, with 145 musician and concert-themed cards added to the Hearthstone library. They have a guitar pick watermark behind their card text. Among these cards are the following class-specific cards:

- legendary minions who are star musicians
- legendary spells representing these musicians' most popular songs
- instrument-themed class weapons
- harmonic spells, which change their effects every turn they remain in the player's hand
- soloist minions, who gain additional effects when they are the only minion on a player's field when summoned

New keywords included are Finale, which is available to all classes, and Overheal, which is unique to the Priest class. Finale cards grant bonus effects when they spend all of a player's remaining mana on their turn. Overheal is only present on Priest minions, and they grant special effects when healed beyond their maximum health. For example, the Priest minion "Ambient Lightspawn" grants a friendly minion (besides itself) +2 Attack and +2 Health when fulfilling either of these conditions.

=== TITANS ===
The second expansion of the “Year of the Wolf” is TITANS. It was announced on June 27, 2023, and was released on August 1, 2023. The expansion takes place in the distant past in the Hearthstone continuity, after the defeat of the Old Gods and before there was life on Azeroth. TITANS cards have a watermark which resembles a tower with arches behind their card text.

This expansion introduces a new minion type, Titan. Each class receives a unique Titan, a powerful celestial being which has three special abilities available to its controller. Each turn, including on the turn the Titan is summoned, its controller may activate one of these abilities. These abilities may only be used once each, after which the Titan may attack as per normal.

This expansion also introduces a new keyword, Forge. Cards that can be forged will have an anvil symbol below their mana cost. Instead of being played as they are, they may be dragged over to a player's deck to be forged, upgrading their effects for a cost of 2 mana. For example, the "Storm Giant", an 8-cost, 8-Attack, 8-Health neutral Taunt minion, can be forged so it costs 2 less mana to summon, and it can be forged endlessly.

The expansion also brings back the Magnetic keyword, which is mostly seen on Mech-type minions. Magnetic minions can be played to the left of an existing, compatible minion to enchant it, adding its statistics and effects to the combined minion. Some of the new Magnetic cards can be magnetized to minion archetypes other than Mechs, such as Beasts and Undead.

=== Showdown In Badlands ===
Shadowdown In Badlands is the final expansion of “Year of the Wolf”. It was announced on October 17, 2023 and released on November 14, 2023. Themed around a gold rush in the Badlands of Khaz Modan, the expansion features cards themed around outlaws, lawmen, and Wild West inhabitants. Cards from this expansion have a sheriff's star badge behind their card text.

This expansion introduces two new keywords. Excavate cards allow players to receive treasures of increasing rarity when played to augment gameplay. Players may do this up to three times, and the cycle resets when they excavate a fourth time. For some classes, they can receive legendary Azerite treasures when they excavate a fourth time instead, before the cycle resets. Quickdraw cards gain special effects if they are played on the same turn they enter a player's hand. For example, the neutral minion Sunspot Dragon allows its controller to deal 6 damage to any target, if played on the same turn.

This expansion also introduces legendary minions with special abilities that only trigger if a player only has one copy of each card in their deck. For example, the druid minion Rheastraza grants its controller a Purified Dragon Nest, which allows them to discover a Dragon-type minion that will cost 4 mana less (other than Rheastraza).
