= Publication history of Anarky =

History of cartoon character

The publication history of Anarky, a character appearing in books published by DC Comics, spans various story arcs and comic book series. Co-created by Alan Grant and Norm Breyfogle, he first appeared in Detective Comics #608 (Nov. 1989), as an adversary of Batman. Introduced as Lonnie Machin, a child prodigy with knowledge of radical philosophy and driven to overthrow governments to improve social conditions, stories revolving around Anarky often focus on political and philosophical themes. The character, who is named after the philosophy of anarchism, primarily espouses anti-statism. Multiple social issues have been addressed whenever the character has appeared in print, including environmentalism, antimilitarism, economic exploitation, and political corruption. Inspired by multiple sources, early stories featuring the character often included homages to political and philosophical books, and referenced anarchist philosophers and theorists. The inspiration for the creation of the character and its early development was based in Grant's personal interest in anti-authoritarian philosophy and politics. However, when Grant himself transitioned to the philosophy of Neo-Tech, he shifted the focus of Anarky from a vehicle for socialist and populist philosophy, to rationalist, atheist, and free market-based thought.

Originally intended to only be used in the debut story in which he appeared, Grant decided to continue using Anarky as a sporadically recurring character throughout the early 1990s, following positive reception by readers and Dennis O'Neil. The character experienced a brief surge in media exposure during the late 1990s, beginning when Norm Breyfogle convinced Grant to produce a limited series based on the character. The 1997 spin-off series, Anarky, was received with positive reviews and sales, and later declared by Grant to be among his "career highlights". Batman: Anarky, a trade paperback collection of stories featuring the character, soon followed. This popular acclaim culminated, however, in a financially and critically unsuccessful ongoing solo series. The 1999 Anarky series, in which even Grant has expressed his distaste, was quickly cancelled after eight issues, but not before sparking a minor controversy by suggesting Anarky was the biological son of the Joker.

Following the cancellation of the Anarky series, and Grant's departure from DC Comics, Anarky experienced a prolonged period of absence from DC publications, despite professional and fan interest in his return. This period of obscurity lasted approximately ten years, with three brief interruptions for minor cameo appearances in 2000, 2001, and 2005. In 2008, Anarky reappeared in an issue of Robin authored by Fabian Nicieza, with the intention of ending this period of obscurity. The storyline drastically altered the character's presentation, prompting a series of responses by Nicieza. Anarky became a recurring character in issues of Red Robin, authored by Nicieza, which was cancelled in 2011.

In 2013 a revamped version of Anarky was debuted as the primary antagonist for Beware the Batman, a Batman animated series produced by Warner Bros. Animation. Later that year, the character made his video game debut in Batman: Arkham Origins, as an anti-villain who attempts to ally with Batman against corruption in Gotham City, while threatening government and corporate institutions with destruction.

== Publication history ==
=== 1989–1996: Creation and early depictions ===
"Anarky, of course, was among the best, if not the best, of the characters Alan created. Alan really created him—along with the other characters—and I was just along for the ride and lucky to be there".

— Norm Breyfogle, 2006.

Originally inspired by his personal political leanings, Alan Grant entertained the idea of interjecting anarchist philosophy into Batman comic books. In an attempt to emulate the success of Chopper, a rebellious youth in Judge Dredd, he conceptualized a character as a twelve-year-old anarchist vigilante, who readers would sympathize with despite the character's harsh methods. Creating the character without any consultation from his partner, illustrator Norm Breyfogle, his only instructions to Breyfogle were that Anarky be designed as a cross between V and the Black Spy from Mad magazine's Spy vs. Spy. Grant also briefly considered incorporating Krazy Kat as a third design suggestion, but decided against the idea. In response to deadline pressures, and not recognizing the character's potential, Breyfogle "made no preliminary sketches, simply draping him in long red sheets". The character was also intended to wear a costume that disguised his youth, and so was fitted with a crude "head extender" that elongated his neck, creating a jarring appearance. While both of these design elements have since been dropped, more enduring aspects of the character have been his golden face mask, "priestly" hat, and his golden sceptre.^{[I]}

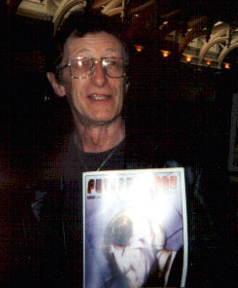
Alan Grant created Anarky when he was inspired by the success of Chopper, a Judge Dredd character, and his own political sentiments.

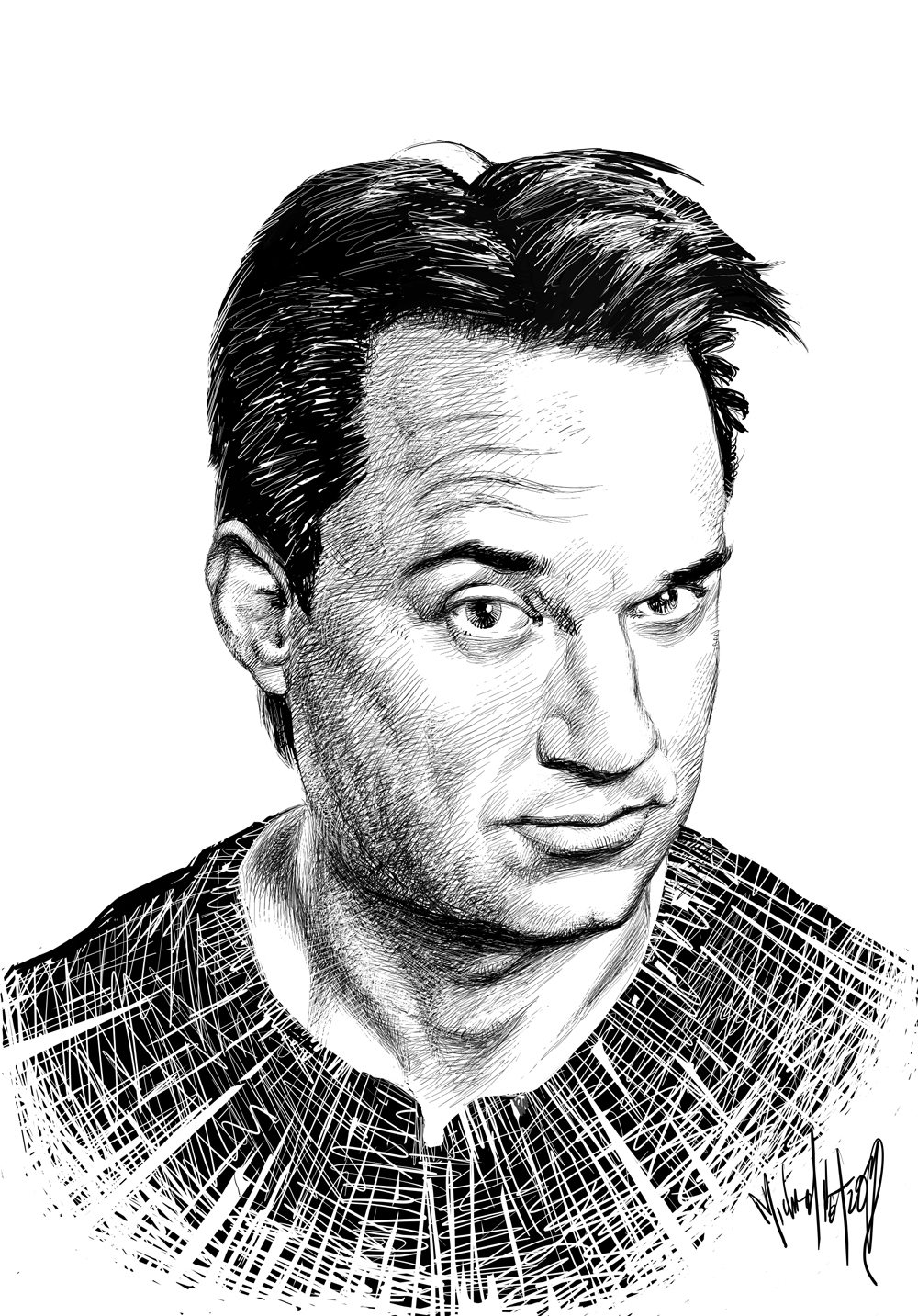
Norm Breyfogle co-created Anarky, providing suggestions for the character's late 1990s development.

The first Anarky story, "Anarky in Gotham City Part 1: Letters to the Editor", appeared in Detective Comics #608 (Nov. 1989). Lonnie Machin is introduced as "Anarky" as early as his first appearance in Detective Comics #608, withholding his origin story for a later point. He is established as an uncommonly philosophical and intelligent 12-year-old. The debut story of the character failed to provide a back story to explain his behavior, but a narrative from Batman reveals that he is a socially conscious and arrogant child who believes he knows how to solve societies' problems. Convinced that only he can do so, he becomes a vigilante and fashions weapons—a stun baton and smoke bombs—in labs at school. Lonnie Machin made his debut as "Anarky" by responding to complaints in the newspaper by attacking the offending sources, such as the owner of a factory whose byproduct waste is polluting local river water. He goes to lengths to disguise his age and appearance by creating a costume with a false head to increase his height. This was in fact intended as a ruse on the part of writer Alan Grant to disguise the character's true identity, and to confuse the reader into believing Anarky to be an adult. Anarky and Batman ultimately come to blows, and during their brief fight, Batman deduces that Anarky is actually a young child. During this first confrontation, Anarky is aided by a band of homeless men, including Legs, a homeless cripple who becomes loyal to him and would assist him in later appearances. After being caught, Lonnie is locked away in a juvenile detention center.

In Grant's earliest script for the character, Anarky was designed to be far more vicious, and to have killed his first victim. Dennis O'Neil, then editor of Detective Comics, requested that Grant "tone down" the script, as he felt Anarky becoming a murderer at such a young age was morally reprehensible. Grant consented to the request and the script was rewritten. In a 2004 interview, Grant explained the motivation behind this early decision: "I wanted to play it that way because it created incredible tension in Anarky himself. Other heroes might kill—Batman used to, in the early days—but for a teenager to rationally decide to take lives ... well, it hadn't been handled in comics before. But Denny was boss, and I respected his opinion and toned things down".

Although Grant had not created the character to be used beyond the two-part debut story, positive reactions from reader letters and his editor caused him to change his mind. He then decided to make Lonnie Machin the third Robin, following Jason Todd, desiring a new sidekick who would act as a foil to Batman, and not have the same motivations for vengeance. This was abandoned when he learned that Tim Drake had already been created to fill the role by Marv Wolfman. Quickly rebounding from this decision, Grant instead used the second appearance of Anarky as the antagonist for Tim Drake's first solo detective case.

This appearance came in Detective Comics #620. The story chronicles that Anarky increases his computer skills during his detention to the point of becoming an advanced grey hat computer hacker. He takes on the online user alias "Moneyspider" to steal millions of dollars from Western corporations, including Wayne Enterprises, outmaneuvering Batman's own data security in the process. He then uses the money to create bank accounts for poor farmers in Third World countries. Tim Drake pursues the hacker in an online investigation, tracking Anarky to his location at the detention center. In 2008, Fabian Nicieza would revert Lonnie Machin to this early alias as part of an attempt to reuse the character following a period of absence lasting approximately 10 years.

In the years following Anarky's creation, the character was rarely incorporated into Batman stories by Grant, being reserved for stories in which the author felt the need to make a philosophical point. Throughout the early 1990s, Anarky was a lesser-known, but established antagonist in the Batman franchise, frequently depicted as escaping from the detention center and peregrinating around Gotham City. However, his back-story had still yet to be elaborated upon. Grant provided hints to Anarky's origin in Robin (vol. 2) Annual #1, "The Anarky Ultimatum", part of Eclipso: The Darkness Within crossover event. Within the story it is revealed that Lonnie Machin was a highly intelligent child who from an early age read prodigiously at local bookstores, but had few friends. Published in 1992, it would not be until 1995 that Grant would finally elaborate upon Lonnie Machin's fictional history.

1995 saw Grant begin the slow increase in the character's abilities that would culminate in the Anarky series. In the "Anarky" story arc from Batman: Shadow of the Bat #40–41, Lonnie is released from juvenile detention, and builds a machine that allows him to fuse both hemispheres of his brain, giving him increased intelligence, and what he perceives as enlightenment. Creating an online bookstore, Anarco, to propagate radical literature, he begins to accumulate funds that he donates through another front company, The Anarkist Foundation, to radical organizations, such as eco-warriors and gun protesters, or keeps for his own projects. These story devices served to further improve Anarky's skill set, and increase his intelligence and financial independence. During this storyline, Grant finally revealed Lonnie Machin's origins in full, using a farewell letter to his parents to provide exposition into the character's motivations. The origin story narrates through flashbacks that Lonnie Machin was once an ordinary child who, while abnormally intelligent, was apolitical and unaware of world events. At 11, he gains a foreign pen pal, Xuasus, as part of a school program. Through this contact, Lonnie discovers the level of global corruption he never knew of before. Further studies into war and political violence leads him to hold radical sympathies. He comes to view all wars as being caused by political elites, with common individuals forced or cajoled into fighting on behalf of the former. He becomes convinced of the need to reshape society and becomes Anarky.

During the Anarky series, much of the character's development was influenced by the nature of Grant and Breyfogle's association. As part of the story writing process, the duo would engage in philosophical discussion carried out entirely over fax-transmissions. These long, in-depth, and occasionally heated debates influenced plot points, as well as the general direction of Anarky's character development. Because of this, Breyfogle personally considers Anarky to be among their few co-creations, whereas he considers other characters they "made" together, such as the Ventriloquist, to be entirely Grant's creations.

=== 1997–1999: Anarky series ===
The cover of Anarky #1 (May 1997); art by Norm Breyfogle.

Following the comic book industry crash of 1996, Norm Breyfogle was unemployed and looking for work. As a result of a request Breyfogle made to DC for employment, Darren Vincenzo, then an editorial assistant at DC Comics, suggested multiple projects which Breyfogle could take part in. Among his suggestions was an Anarky limited series, written by Grant, which was eventually the project decided upon. The four-issue limited series, Anarky, was published in May 1997. Entitled "Metamorphosis", the story maintained the character's anti-authoritarian sentiments, but was instead based on Neo-Tech, a philosophy developed by Frank R. Wallace.

During the climax of the "Anarky" storyline of Batman: Shadow of the Bat #41-42, it is implied that Anarky dies in a large explosion. In turn, the Anarky limited series resolved this event by revealing that Anarky survives, but chooses to shed the encumbrance of his double life by faking his death. Anarky works in seclusion to further his goal of achieving a utopian society, briefly hiring Legs and other homeless men to monitor Batman's movements. His four-issue adventure leads him into conflict with Etrigan the Demon and Darkseid, as Anarky confronts the nature of evil through dialogue, and concludes with a showdown against Batman, addressing the issue of consequentialism.

"Anarky, not having any super powers, doesn't have what it takes to bring the fans in month after month. He's the sort of character you can get away with using in an annual once a year plus his own miniseries once a year and maybe as a guest star every couple of years, but he's not capable, he's not strong enough to hold his own monthly title. Very few characters are when it comes down to it".

— Alan Grant, 2007.

Well received by critics and financially successful, Grant has referred to the limited series as one of his favorite projects, and ranked it among his "career highlights". With its success, Vincenzo suggested continuing the book as an ongoing series to Breyfogle and Grant. Although Grant was concerned that such a series would not be viable, he agreed to write it at Breyfogle's insistence, as the illustrator was still struggling for employment. Grant's primary concerns centered on his belief that Anarky's role as a non-superpowered teenager was not capable of competing for reader attention when DC Comics already had a similar series in Robin. Further, while potential disagreements with editors over story elements were not among his initial concerns, he eventually found himself constantly at odds with editors and editorial assistants throughout the creation of the series.

Grant's doubts concerning the comic's prospects eventually proved correct. The series was panned by critics, failed to catch on among readers, and was canceled after eight issues, but Grant has noted that it was popular in Latin American countries, perhaps owing to a history of political repression in the region. "It didn't sit too well with American readers, who prefer the soap opera and cool costume aspects of superhero comics. But I became a minor hero in many Latin countries, like Argentina and Mexico, where readers had been subjected to tyranny and fascism and knew precisely what I was writing about". Breyfogle gave a similar explanation for what he believed to be the cause of the series' failure. In an essay written after the cancellation of the series, he reflected on the difficulty of combining escapist entertainment with social commentary: "Anarky is a hybrid of the mainstream and the not-quite-so-mainstream. This title may have experienced exactly what every "half-breed" suffers: rejection by both groups with which it claims identity".

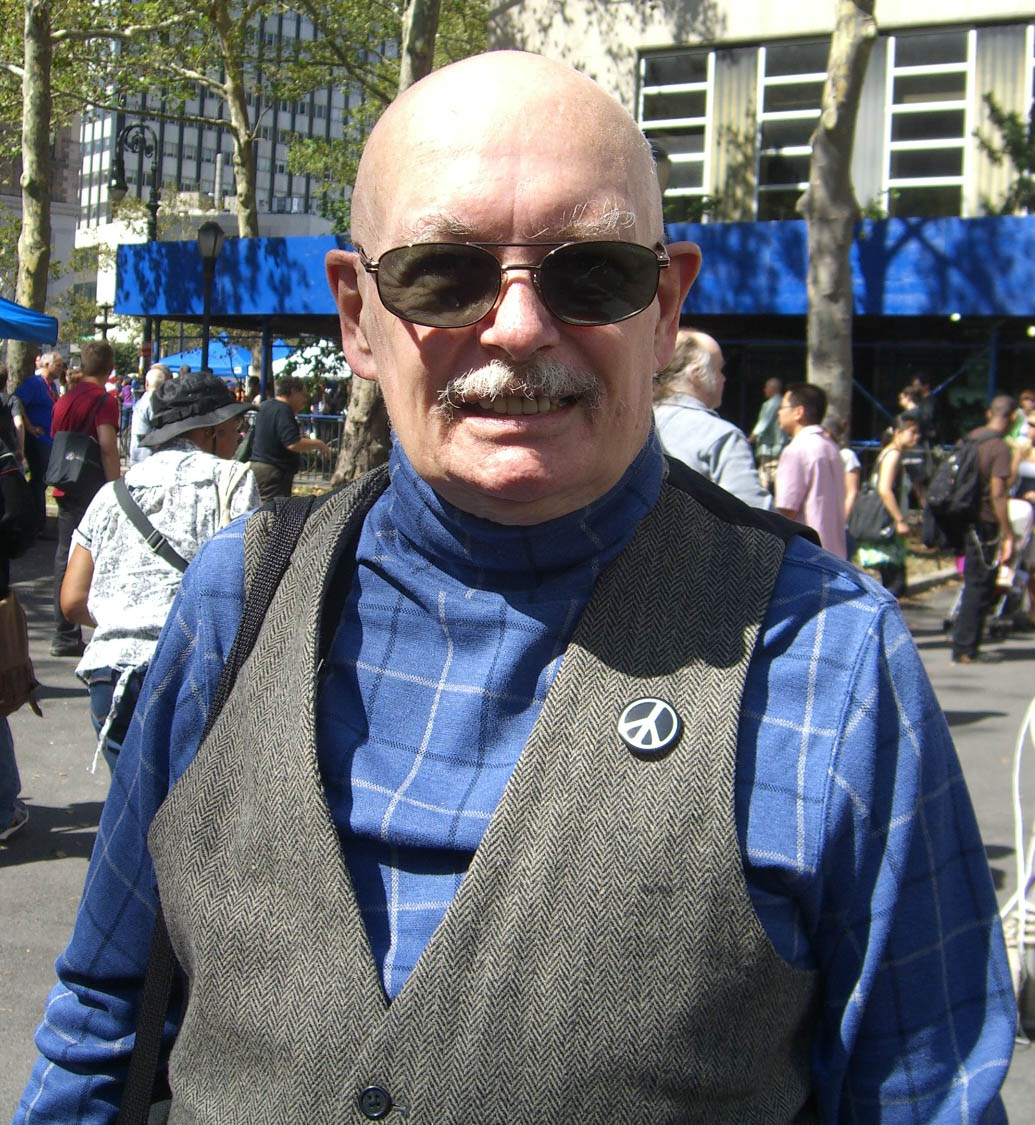
Dennis O'Neil, Group Editor for the Batman family of comic books from 1986 to 2000, was at odds with the suggestion that Anarky become the son of the Joker.

Despite numerous editorial impositions, the most controversial plot point was not a mandate, but was instead a suggestion by Breyfogle, intended as a means to expand Anarky's characterization: that Anarky's biological father be revealed to be the Joker. Breyfogle expressed an interest using the relationship as a source for internal conflict in the character: "... I figured that because Anarky represents the epitome of reason, one of the biggest crises he could face would be to discover that his father was the exact opposite: a raving lunatic!" Alternatively, Grant saw it as an opportunity to solidify Anarky's role in the Batman franchise.

Grant's decision to pursue the suggestion ran into conflict with Dennis O'Neil, who protested against it. Grant recalled: "Denny only let me write that story under protest, he was totally opposed to Joker being Anarky's father and said under no circumstances would DC allow that". Grant persisted, suggesting that the move would generate interest for the comic book, and that the story could be undone later in another story. With O'Neil's permission, the sub-plot of Anarky's unrevealed heritage was published in the series' first issue. With the eventual series cancellation, the final issue was quickly written to reveal the identity of Anarky's father as the Joker, simply to resolve the plot line, and leaving any future rebuttal to a future publications.

As the last issue of the Anarky series, the unresolved finale left open the possibility that the Joker might be Anarky's actual father, and the planned "rebuttal" was never published. Further, Grant and Breyfogle later speculated that as Dennis O'Neil has retired from DC Comics, and the final editorial decision currently belongs to Dan DiDio, it is no longer possible to be sure whether a rebuttal will ever be published. As of 2012, there is yet no record of Didio ever commenting on the subject, though the DC Universe timeline chronologically prevents the Joker from being Anarky's biological father, as the character's birth predates the existence of either Batman or the Joker.

As Anarky was created while Grant and Breyfogle were operating under "work-for-hire" rules, DC Comics owns all rights to the Anarky character. Following the cancellation of the Anarky series, both men attempted to buy the rights to Anarky from the company, but their offer was declined.

=== 2000–2007: Absence from DC publications ===
"We don't have any conclusive evidence, but Alan and I can't help but feel that Anarky's philosophy grated on somebody's nerves; somebody got a look at it and didn't like it ... So I've generally gotten the impression that Anarky was nixed because of its philosophy. Especially in this age of post 9/11, Anarky would be a challenge to established authority. He's very anti-establishment, that's why he's named Anarky!"

— Norm Breyfogle, 2003.

After the financial failure of Anarky (vol. 2), the character entered a period of absence from DC publications that lasted several years. Norm Breyfogle attempted to continue using the character in other comics during this time, co-writing an issue of The Spectre with John Marc DeMatteis that would cameo Anarky as a rationalist foil to the mystical nature of the Spectre. When this story was rejected, Breyfogle came to suspect the character's prolonged absence was due in part to censorship.

Since the cancellation of the Anarky series, Grant has disassociated himself from the direction of the character. In a 2004 interview he recalled that he had been asked by James Peatty for a critique of an Anarky/Green Arrow script the latter had written. Peatty desired to know if his presentation of Anarky had been correct. Grant declined to read the story, explaining, "you have to let these things go". The script was published in 2005 and Anarky made the guest appearance billed as his "return" to DC continuity in Green Arrow #51, "Anarky in the USA".

The story narrative chronicles Anarky's reappearance after several years of obscurity in response to a bombing in Star City that he is framed for. He teams up with the Green Arrow to hunt down the guilty parties, but remains a wanted felon by authorities. Although the front cover of the issue advertised the comic as the "return" of the character, Anarky failed to make any further appearances. This was despite comments by Peatty that he had further plans to write stories for the character. Among his comments was the suggestion that he intended to explore the cliffhanger of Anarky's parentage left after the cancellation of the original Anarky series, and that as Green Arrow #51 was being published, he had already written a two-part story for Batman which featured Anarky.

Besides Breyfogle and Peatty, Todd Seavey was another professional writer who expressed an interest in creating stories for Anarky. A freelance libertarian writer and editor, and author of several issues of Justice League, Seavey considered authoring an Anarky series his "dream comics project".

Breyfogle has also noted that Anarky retained interest among a "diehard" fan base during this obscure period. During a panel at WonderCon 2006, multiple requests were made by the audience for Anarky to appear in the DC Comics limited series 52. In response, Dan DiDio announced two weeks later, at a DC Comics panel during the New York Comic Con, that the writing team of 52 had decided to create a part for the character. 52 editor, Michael Siglain, later responded to a reader question concerning when Anarky would appear in the series, estimating Anarky would appear in later issues. However, 52 concluded without Anarky making an appearance and with no explanation given by anyone involved in the production of the series.^{[II]}

=== 2008: Return as "Moneyspider" ===
"I took 2 characters who had not been seen in 10 years and told a story with them that sets up the potential for more stories to be told using those characters. I call that a good day at the office".

— Fabian Nicieza, 2009.

In 2008, Anarky reappeared in the December issue of Robin (vol. 2) #181. Anarky was among several villains to be showcased in DC Comic's "Faces of Evil" event. With the publication of Robin (vol. 2) #181, it was revealed that Lonnie Machin's role as Anarky had been supplanted by another Batman villain, Ulysses Hadrian Armstrong. Further, Machin was depicted as being held hostage by Armstrong, "paralyzed and catatonic", encased in an iron lung, and connected to computers through his brain. This final feature allowed the character to connect to the Internet and communicate with others via a speech synthesizer.

The story, "Pushing Buttons, Pulling Strings", narrates that as Tim Drake attempts to maintain control of Gotham City in Batman's absence following the "Batman R.I.P." storyline, the ultimate foe attempting to foment chaos and destroy the city through gang wars and terrorist bombings is Armstrong. Armstrong is also revealed to have encountered Lonnie Machin at an unspecified point prior to the story, at which time Machin was "shot in the head", leaving him paralyzed and hostage to Armstrong. Incapacitated, Machin reverts to his hacker identity as "Moneyspider", while Armstrong commandeers the identity of Anarky and conspires to acquire power through chaos. The storyline concluded with the publication of Robin (vol. 2) #182, on January 21, 2009, as part of the "Faces of Evil" event. The issue featured the Ulysses Hadrian Armstrong version of Anarky on the front cover of the issue, but did not include Lonnie Machin as a character within the story.

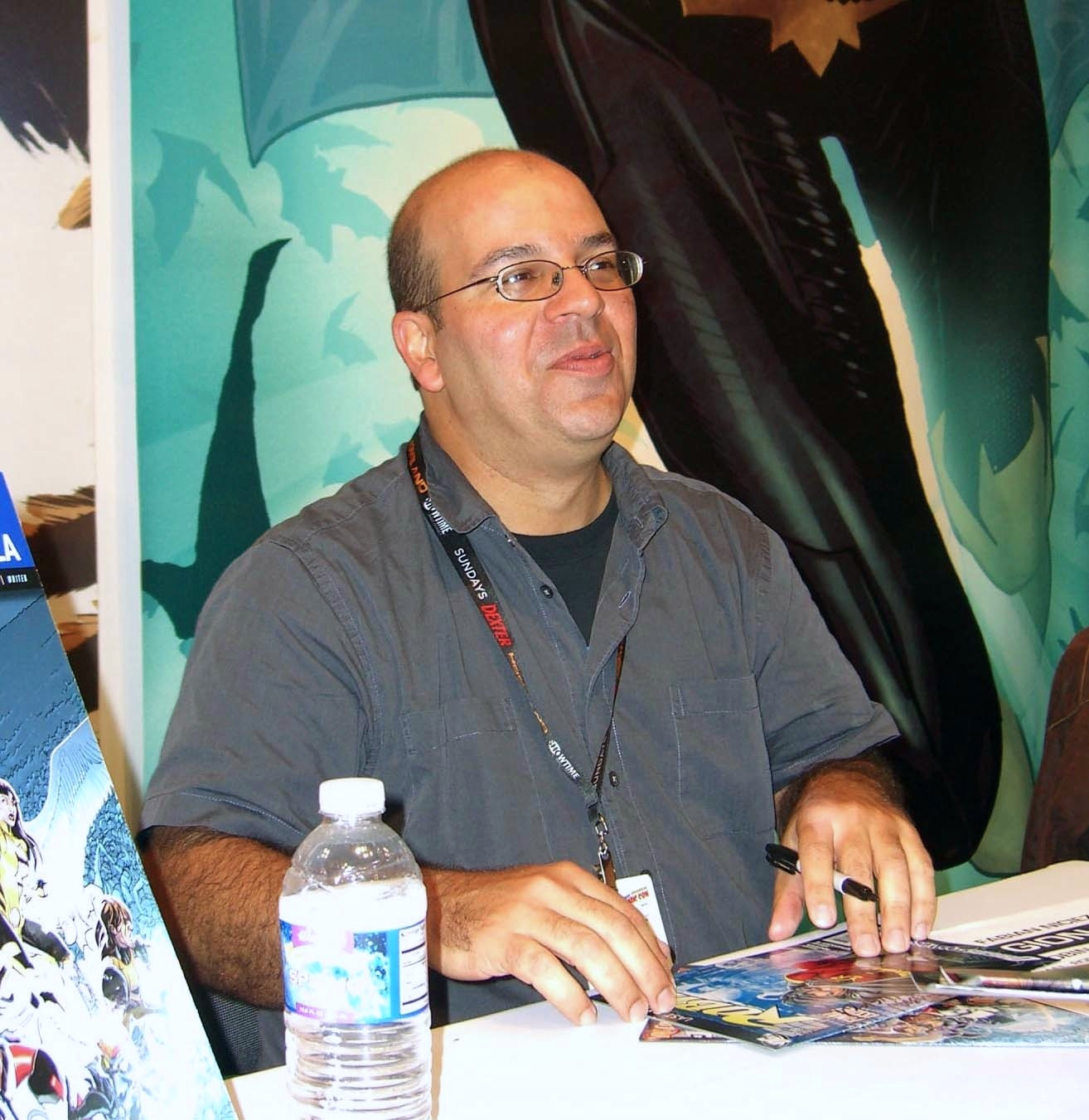
Fabian Nicieza's reintroduction of Anarky took the character in a new direction, upsetting some of the character's fans.

Fabian Nicieza, author of the issue and storyline in which Anarky appeared, responded to reader concerns in an internet forum for a Q&A secession with fans a few days after issue #181 was published. Nicieza explained his decision behind giving Machin's mantle as Anarky to another character was due to his desire to establish "Robin's Joker", and that "the concept of Anarky, applied in a visceral, immature fashion, would make an excellent counterpoint to Robin's ordered methodical thinking". However, in an effort to respect the original characterization of Anarky, it was necessary that it not be Machin, who Nicieza recognized as neither immature, nor a villain. Nicieza also noted the difficulty inherent in writing any story featuring Anarky, due to the complexity of the character's philosophy. Regardless, Nicieza did desire to use Machin and properly return the character to publication, and so favored presenting Ulysses H. Armstrong as Anarky, and Lonnie Machin as MoneySpider, describing the latter as an "electronic ghost". The alias Moneyspider was a secondary name briefly used by Grant for Anarky in a 1990 Detective Comics storyline. Nicieza felt that this created a scenario in which each could be used for different effects. As he put it, "[o]ne can prove a physical opposition to Robin (Ulysses as Anarky), the other an intellectual one (Lonnie as MoneySpider)". Nicieza also acknowledged that this dramatic change in the character's presentation would upset fans of the character, but countered that he felt he had not made any changes to the character which could not be undone easily by other writers.

Following the publication of Robin (vol. 2) #181, Roderick Long, a political commentator and Senior Scholar at the Ludwig von Mises Institute, and self-professed fan of the character, expressed annoyance at the portrayal of the character of Lonnie Machin and the usurpation of the Anarky mantle by Armstrong. Upon learning of Nicieza's reasoning for the portrayal, Long parodied the explanation as a mock-dialectic, writing: "Thesis: Anarky is too interesting a character not to write about. Antithesis: Anarky is too interesting a character for me to write successfully about. Dialectical synthesis: Therefore I will make Anarky less interesting so I can write about him".

Grant also commented on the transformation in an interview for the Scotland regional edition of The Big Issue: "Someone recently sent me DC's new take on Anarky and I was saddened to see they were using him as just another asshole villain".

"I did not reach out to Alan for the simple reason that I KNEW I was taking his original creation and mangling it, twisting its core conceptual meaning and regurgitating it in an impure fashion. I felt little benefit in contacting a creator who I know wouldn't necessarily like the idea even if I could explain why (which I can) nor did I do it because I feel there has to be a little 'statute of limitations' on that kind of outreach".

— Fabian Nicieza, 2009.

Several months later, in a forum discussion, Nicieza once again defended his writing of the story. In a discussion regarding communication between comic book authors, and whether writers were bothered when their creations were altered, or re-characterized, by other authors of a shared universe, Nicieza's treatment of Anarky was criticized. In addressing the concerns of his detractors, Nicieza submitted that he fully agreed with the criticisms by Alan Grant. As Nicieza explained, his intention was to deliberately alter the concept the Anarky mantle represented, while attempting to respect the characterization of Lonnie Machin. For this reason, Nicieza also saw little reason to communicate with Grant for feedback, and so made no overtures to Anarky's creator. Nicieza also confessed to his personal discomfort with communicating with Grant, given the latter's estrangement from DC Comics.

Nicieza continued his explanation, tackling the topic of the new "misapplication" of the philosophical underpinnings of the Anarky mantle in the hands of the General: "I was well aware that the General's application of the name, costume and themes were inaccurate to the political philosophy of Anarchy (and of Lonnie's reason for being as Anarky). It's even STATED in print during the course of the story that Ulysses didn't 'get it'". Nicieza then concluded with a restatement in his expectation that other writers now had the opportunity to pursue stories which would make use of the characters: "I could understand original Anarky readers and the creator of the character not agreeing with that, but therein lies the beauty of our medium -- there's always another story to tell that could 'fix' what you don't like ..."

=== 2009–2011: Red Robin series ===
With the conclusion of Robin (vol. 2) #182, Nicieza began authoring the 2009 Azrael series, leaving any future use of Anarky or Moneyspider to author Christopher Yost, who would pick up the Robin character in a new Red Robin series. At the 2009 New York Comic Con panel for the "Batman: Battle for the Cowl" storyline, various collaborating writers, editors, and artists for Batman-related comic books took questions from the audience. When asked a question regarding Anarky, Mike Marts confirmed that "Anarky" would be utilized in future publications, but did not elaborate further. Yet in the ensuing months, Yost only made one brief reference to Anarky, without directly involving the character in a story plot.

In 2010, Nicieza replaced Yost as the author of Red Robin, and Nicieza was quick to note his interest in using Anarky and Moneyspider in future issues of the series. Nicieza reintroduced Ulysses Armstrong and Lonnie Machin over the course of several storylines, and regularly used Lonnie as a cast member of the ongoing Red Robin series. Within Nicieza's first storyline, "The Hit List", Tim Drake rescues Lonnie Machin from the evil Ulysses Armstrong, who escapes capture and still claims the "Anarky" mantle. Recruiting Lonnie as he recovers from his coma, Drake asks that Machin act as Moneyspider and join him in fighting crime. Tim Drake comes to rely on Machin for his computer wizardry, as well as for his advice and companionship, in issues that follow. In the next story arc, "The Rabbit Hole", Nicieza reintroduced readers to a concept explored in other DC Universe comic books—the virtual reality realm of the Ünternet. Within the plot, Tim Drake is aided by Machin in hacking the Ünternet, a virtual realm used by criminals as a meeting space and form of entertainment. Once inside, Machin seizes control of the system, where he is returned to a digitized semblance of his former health and reclaims the mantle of "Anarky" within cyberspace. Uniquely gifted with full control of his bicameral mind, he leaves half of his personality as Anarky online at all times, even as the other half interacts with Drake offline as Moneyspider. Fending off villains within the digital realm with Tim Drake's help, Moneyspider is told to shut down the entire system by Drake. Sensing an opportunity, he pretends to do so, but instead secretly salvages it for himself. With the cancellation of the series five months later, the repercussions of these events were left unexplored.

The series was cancelled in October 2011, as a result of The New 52, a revamp and relaunch by DC Comics of its entire line of ongoing monthly superhero comic books, in which all of its existing titles were cancelled. 52 new series debuted in September with new #1 issues to replace the cancelled titles.

=== 2012–2013: Debuts in animation and video games ===
"We've kind of said that Batman is the black king and Anarky is the white king. So it's sort of this psychological chess game".

— Glen Murakami, 2012.

At the MIPJunior conference, in October 2011, Sam Register, executive vice president for creative affairs at Warner Bros. Animation, announced several upcoming events for 2012, including a new CGI animated series, Beware the Batman, intended to focus on lesser known villains for an unfamiliar audience. A Cartoon Network press release wrote that Anarky would be one of the planned villains to be included, while series developers later explained that the character is revamped for the series and chosen as the primary antagonist. Series producers Glen Murakami and Mitch Watson compared his role to that of "Moriarty to Batman's Sherlock Holmes", explaining that he would indirectly challenge Batman through complex machinations. Anarky debuted in the first season's third episode, "Tests", on July 27, 2013. The episode was written by Jim Krieg, with direction by Curt Geda, while the character was voiced by Wallace Langham. Scott Thill, technology and pop culture commentator for Wired magazine, has praised the choice to debut Anarky on television, noting the character's relevance following the rise of the Occupy movement and the hacktivist activities of Anonymous.

In 2013, Anarky later made his video game debut in Batman: Arkham Origins. Presenting the first game play demonstration for the game at the Electronic Entertainment Expo, and providing sit down interviews for media was the creative director of WB Games Montréal, Eric Holmes. Anarky was presented as an example of the new "Most Wanted" system introduced in the series. The system used guest villains to create mini-quests for players to optionally tackle, adding variety and replay value to the game.

The game was released on October 25, 2013. Voiced by Matthew Mercer, Anarky's side-mission involved his placing explosives at corporate and government locations. However, Anarky doesn't act strictly as a villain, but rather would attempt to appeal to Batman for an alliance. Extra components of the game included a series of invisible "Anarky tags" hidden throughout the over world map, which upon discovery would provide an essay explaining his critique of social problems; and a pirate radio station, "Liberation Radio", which the player could listen to as Anarky summarized the history of the 1919 United States anarchist bombings. The actual side mission involved a race against a countdown timer, as the player guided Batman across the city skyline from a starting point to reach the destination. Upon arrival, the player must defeat guards protecting a bomb and then deactivate it before detonation, which commentators compared to a similar side mission in Batman: Arkham City which involved Victor Zsasz.

Though aware of the "Moneyspider" period the character had experienced in the pages of Red Robin, Holmes explained that the developers had primarily drawn upon the earliest stories for Anarky by Alan Grant and Norm Breyfogle in Detective Comics. In response to a comment from an interviewer on the contemporary popularity of anarchism, Holmes acknowledged it as a factor in the choice to include the character in the game, and to update his appearance to that of a street protester with a gang resembling a social movement. He also noted the character's resemblance to the masked protesters of Anonymous. According to Holmes, Anarky's relevance to contemporary protest movements was the key element that made Anarky stand out among the characters of the game: "In the real world, this is Anarky's moment. Right now. Today". Holmes also warned players unfamiliar with Anarky against investigating the character through published material online, as he felt it would potentially spoil surprises the game held.^{[III]}

Alan Grant was later quoted as "honoured" by the choice to include Anarky in the game, though also "slightly peeved" that Anarky's character design had been based on what he felt were anarchist stereotypes, "complete with Molotov cocktails!" He was nonetheless pleased with the way the character was utilized within the game, and remarked that he'd also like to see Anarky used in films: "I’d love to see Anarky get even more exposure... though only if the writers handled him properly".

=== 2013: Post-New 52 ===
While Anarky was "rising in profile in other media" by mid 2013, the character had yet to be reintroduced to the status quo of the Post-New 52 DC Universe. This changed on August 12, when DC Comics announced that Anarky would be reintroduced in Green Lantern Corps #25, "Powers That Be", on November 13 the same year. The issue was a tie-in to the "Batman: Zero Year" crossover event, authored by Van Jensen and co-plotted by Robert Venditti.

In the lead up to the publication date, at a panel event at the New York Comic Con, Jensen was asked by a fan holding a "plush Anarky doll" what the character's role would be in the story. Jensen explained that Anarky "would have a very big hand" in the story, and further explained, "you can understand what he's doing even if you don't agree with what he's doing". Jensen had also indicated that his version of Anarky would be a "fresh take that also honors his legacy".

The story featured a character study of John Stewart, narrating Stewart's final mission as a young Marine in the midst of a Gotham City power blackout and citywide evacuation, mere days before a major storm is to hit the city. Anarky is depicted as rallying a group of followers and evacuees to occupy a sports stadium, on the basis that the area the stadium was built upon was gentrified at the expense of the local community and should be returned to them. The identity of this new version of Anarky was unrevealed, as Anarky escapes capture at the end of the story. The main story sequence is interwoven with flashbacks as Stewart's mother narrates her experiences as a child during the 1967 Detroit riot, forming the basis for the content of his family's character.

A review of the storyline embraced two particular additions brought to the revamped version of Anarky; the first being that this new version of Anarky is portrayed as an African American, as Batman has traditionally lacked many black villains; the second choice being to preserve the character's anonymity. To the commentator, this presented the opportunity that this Anarky could also be female. However, while the story had borrowed its characterization and design of Anarky from the version found in Batman: Arkham Origins, it was judged to have simultaneously made the character less threatening. The reviewer drew upon this result to caution the "need to reach a happy medium between the disillusioned protester we see here and the super genius kung fu fighting terrorist from Beware the Batman".

== List of notable media appearances ==
Release timeline
1989	Detective Comics #608–609 "Anarky in Gotham City"
1990
1991
1992
1993
1994
1995	Batman: Shadow of the Bat #40-41 "Anarky"
1996
1997	Anarky #1–4 "Metamorphosis"
1998
1999	Anarky (vol. 2) #1–8
2000
2001
2002
2003
2004
2005
2006
2007
2008	Robin (vol. 4) #177–182 "Search for a Hero"
2009
2010	Red Robin #13 "The Hit List"
2011
2012
2013	Green Lantern Corps #25 "Powers That Be"
2014
2015	Detective Comics Vol. 2 #38-40 "Anarky"
2016
2017	Detective Comics #963-964 "Utopia/Dystopia"
2018	Detective Comics #969-973 "Fall of the Batmen"
2019
2020
2021	I Am Batman #2 "Fear State"

=== Comics ===
As a lesser-known and underutilized character in the DC Universe, Anarky has a smaller library of associated comic books and significant story lines than more popular DC Comics characters. Between 1989 and 1996, Anarky was primarily written by Alan Grant in Batman-related comics, received a guest appearance in a single issue of Green Arrow by Kevin Dooley, and was given an entry in Who's Who in the DC Universe.

In the late 1990s, Anarky entered a brief period of minor prominence; first with the publication of Anarky in 1997; followed in 1998 with the Batman: Anarky collection; and in 1999, with featured appearances in both DCU Heroes Secret Files and Origins #1 and the ongoing series, Anarky (vol. 2). After the cancellation of the ongoing series, Anarky lapsed into an obscurity that lasted nearly 10 years. This ambiguous condition was not complete, as Anarky was sporadically used during this time. These appearances include marginal cameos in issues of Young Justice, Wonder Woman, and Green Arrow.

Anarky made a controversial appearance in 2008 (in Robin (vol. 4) #177-182) as part of an effort to return the character to regular publication, and became a recurring cast member in the Red Robin series in November 2010, until the series was cancelled in October 2011.

Series

- Anarky, vol. 1, no. 1–4 (May–Aug 1997). New York City, NY: DC Comics.

Comprising the entire "Metamorphosis" story arc, this 1997 limited series was retroactively labeled the "first volume" following its continuation in 1999.

- Anarky, vol. 2, no. 1–8 (May–Dec 1999). New York City, NY: DC Comics.

Anarky relocates to Washington, D.C. to wage war against the United States government, in a financially and critically unsuccessful ongoing series.

- Red Robin, vol. 1, no. 13–25 (Aug 2010 – Sep 2011). New York City, NY: DC Comics.

Anarky is revamped as "Moneyspider", a comatose hacker recruited by the eponymous Red Robin to act as a recurring cast member and literary foil in this ongoing series.

Collections

- Batman: Anarky (February 2, 1999). New York, NY: DC Comics, 1-56389-437-8.

A trade paperback collecting four stories featuring Anarky in various Batman-related comics between 1989 and 1997.

Notable story arcs

- "Anarky in Gotham City" Detective Comics, no. 608–609 (Nov–Dec 1989).

Anarky's debut appearance in Detective Comics, in which Anarky begins a campaign of revolt in Gotham City.

- "Metamorphosis" Anarky, vol. 1, no. 1–4 (May–August 1997).

Anarky attempts to "deprogram" humanity of all social constraints in a four-part limited series, revamping Anarky with new abilities and philosophy.

- "The Sins of the Father" Anarky, vol. 2, no. 8 (December 1999).

Anarky seeks the truth of his parentage and learns the Joker may be his father in this controversial final issue of the ongoing Anarky series.

- "Search for a Hero" Robin, vol. 4, no. 177–182 (August 2008 – January 2009).

Robin faces a mysterious figure who promotes gang warfare in Batman's absence in the final story arc of Robin (vol. 4), which reintroduces Lonnie Machin as "Moneyspider".

- "Powers That Be" Green Lantern Corps, vol. 3, no. 25 (November 2013).

Anarky has rallied a neighborhood against a group of Marines, including John Stewart, who are attempting to rescue them in the midst of a Gotham City evacuation, in Anarky's New 52 debut.

=== Other media ===
==== Television ====
===== Arrowverse =====
Anarky appears in Arrow, portrayed by Alexander Calvert. This version is an unhinged former mob enforcer who is hired by Damien Darhk to cause chaos in Star City. However, when Darhk fires him for going too far, Machin develops a monomaniac desire to destroy Darhk. This brings him into conflict with Team Arrow, in the process being badly burnt by Speedy and subsequently using a plastic mask to hide the injuries.

===== Animation =====
- When asked by a fan-site if Anarky would be featured in The New Batman Adventures, writer Paul Dini called his possible inclusion a "longshot". He ultimately did not appear in the show itself, but was however depicted as existing in the continuity of the series: a poster by Ty Templeton in Batman & Superman Magazine was the first to feature him, followed by a story written by his creator Alan Grant in The Batman Adventures #31.
- Anarky appears in Beware the Batman, voiced by Wallace Langham. This version has a primarily white costume and is a criminal mastermind obsessed with both chaos and chess, enacting complex plans to battle Batman, who he views as his exact opposite. He later forms an alliance with District Attorney Harvey Dent, as the two both want to take down Batman. Though his plans seemingly work when Deathstroke seemingly kills Batman, Dent, having gone insane after being disfigured, attempts to murder Anarky. Anarky nearly kills Dent in retaliation, but Commissioner Gordon disarms him, and Anarky escapes. In the final scene of the series, Anarky, hiding in a dilapidated room, compliments Batman for beating him, before announcing he plans to "play again".
- Anarky makes a non-speaking cameo appearance in the Harley Quinn episode "There's No Place to Go But Down" as a prisoner in Bane's pit.

==== Video games ====
- Anarky appears in Batman: Arkham Origins, voiced by Matthew Mercer. This version is a teenager and leads a movement among the homeless and desperate, setting explosives at government and corporate buildings that Batman must deactivate.
- Anarky appears as a character summon in Scribblenauts Unmasked: A DC Comics Adventure.
- Anarky makes a vocal cameo appearance in Batman: Arkham Shadow.

==== Traditional games ====
- Vs. System: Arkham Inmates. Anarky: Lonnie Machin (DWF-122), Vs. System. Illustration by Sam Keith.
- Vs. System: Arkham Inmates. Ulysses Armstrong: Anarky, Chaos Successor (DCN-064), Vs. System.
- DC Comics: Arkham Asylum. Anarky No.20, HeroClix. (October 2008 - July 2012)

== See also ==
- List of comic book supervillain debuts
- Modern Age of Comic Books
- Publication history of Dick Grayson
- Publication history of Superman
- Publication history of Wonder Woman
- Red Hood vs. Anarky

== Footnotes ==
I. Following Anarky's debut in "Anarky in Gotham City", the character's design incorporated the head extender in Robin Annual #1 (1992), Green Arrow #89 (Aug. 1994), and The Batman Adventures #31 (April 1995). The head extender was not included in Shadow of The Bat #18 (Oct. 1993), and The Batman Chronicles #1 (summer 1995).
II. 52 was promoted as a comic that would attempt to incorporate as many DC Comics characters as possible. In a Q&A session hosted by Newsarama.com, Michael Siglain answered a series of questions regarding which characters fans wanted to see in the series. Question No. 19 asked "We were told Anarky would be playing a part in 52. Could you please tell us when we can expect his appearances?" Siglain's simple response to readers was, "check back in the late 40s." Speculation centered on the prospect of Anarky appearing in issue No.48 of the series, as the solicited cover illustration was released to the public several weeks before the issues' publication. On the cover, the circle-A could be seen as a minor element in the background. In a review for "Week 48", Major Spoilers considered the absence of Anarky a drawback: "It's too bad we didn't see the return of Anarky as hinted by this week's cover" Pop culture critic, Douglas Wolk, wrote, "I guess this issue's cover is the closest we're going to get to Anarky after all (and by proxy as close as we're going to get to the Haunted Tank). Too bad."
III. In warning readers to avoid spoiling potential surprises for their experience in playing Batman: Arkham Origins, Eric Holmes specifically referenced the Wikipedia article on the character as a resource to avoid. "You know what? If you want to enjoy the game, don't bother reading up on him, because there are a few surprises about him which will turn up in the game, and if you go read Wikipedia or something like that, it'll rob you a little bit on some of the stuff in the game, because there are some surprises about Anarky."
IV. Anarky is not actually a part of the main story of the game, but is rather featured in several other respects. As part of the "Most Wanted" game feature, which encourages the player to track down side missions at their leisure, apprehending Anarky unlocks the "Anarky" character trophy. An "Anarky tag" collectible feature encourages players to search the city of Gotham map for hidden messages left by Anarky for his followers, earning the player the "Voice of the People" achievement if completed, and a "Liberation Radio" broadcast can be heard using Batman's Cryptographic Sequencer tool, which broadcasts Anarky's recitation of the "Plain Words" flier found during the 1919 United States anarchist bombings. A second collectible feature, Enigma's "extortion data files" include two for Anarky featuring voice actors performing as a corrupt cop coercing a homeless person to infiltrate Anarky's ranks, and Anarky calling Gordon and informing the latter to leave the city as he does not wish to hurt the officer and believes he can still be "rehabilitated".
