= Neo-Tech =

Neo-Tech or Neo Tech may refer to:

- Neo-Tech Publishing Company, now known as Integrated Management Associates
- Neo-Tech (philosophy), a philosophy promoted by Frank R. Wallace
- Neo Tech, a variant of the Neo Sans typeface
- Neotech, game produced by Neogames
