= DC Retroactive =

- Cover for DC Retroactive – Batman: 1970s (Sept. 2011), art by Tom Mandrake.

Publication information
- Publisher: DC Comics
- Publication date: September and October 2011
- No. of issues: 18
- Main character(s): Batman, the Flash, Green Lantern, the Justice League, Superman, Wonder Woman

Creative team
- Written by: List: Brian Augustyn, Mike W. Barr, Cary Bates, Gerry Conway, J. M. DeMatteis, Keith Giffen, Alan Grant, Ron Marz, William Messner-Loebs, Dennis O'Neil, Martin Pasko, Louise Simonson, Roy Thomas, Len Wein, Marv Wolfman
- Artist: List: Jerry Bingham, Jon Bogdanove, J. Bone, Norm Breyfogle, Sergio Cariello, Mike Grell, Greg LaRocque, Kevin Maguire, Tom Mandrake, Ron Randall
- Penciller: List: Darryl Banks, Eduardo Barreto, Mike Bowden, Rich Buckler, Benito Gallego, Lee Moder, Gordon Purcell, Joe Staton
- Inker: List: Terry Austin, Sal Buscema, Christian Duce, Dan Green, Andy Owens, Joe Rubinstein, Joe Seung, Andy Smith
- Editor: List: Ben Abernathy, Jim Chadwick, Kwanza Johnson

DC Retroactive is a line of one-shot comic book issues published by DC Comics. It revisited periods (grouped by decades) of the company's main characters: Batman, Superman, Wonder Woman, Green Lantern, the Justice League, and the Flash. These comics were published with cover dates of September and October 2011. The DC Retroactive comic books followed the Flashpoint event and were launched just before The New 52 line wherein DC titles were relaunched starting from #1.

== Publication history ==
The one-shots featured different characters with a nostalgic version of their most representative decades. DC brought back some of the most relevant creative teams in the history of its main characters. Dennis O'Neil wrote Batman during the 1970s, as well as working with artist Mike Grell on the mid-1970s version of Green Lantern.

The Retroactive line also brought back writers and artists who had not worked for DC for many years; some of whom had retired from comics, such as Rich Buckler, who drew one Wonder Woman story. Mike W. Barr, Cary Bates, Norm Breyfogle, Gerry Conway, Tom Mandrake, and Len Wein worked on the characters which they were associated with in the past.

Each comic book was published in a 46-page format, split between 26 pages of new content, plus 20 pages of reprinted tales.

Ben Abernathy, one of the editors of the project, stated: "It's the creators working on the characters that so many fans grew up reading. Readers have a real fondness and love for the material. And the opportunity to revisit that era, with the creators who made it great, is a welcome change from everything else going on in the industry these days". Abernathy also noted that "the mandate given was, basically, we wanted to tell a fun story that was set in the era, whether it be posed as a 'lost story', 'story they always wanted to tell' or maybe something connected to the reprint".

On June 21, 2011, DC revealed the covers for the 1970s issues on The Source blog.

== Titles ==
Issue	Cover date	Writer(s)	Artist(s)	Citations
Batman - The '70s	September 2011	Len Wein	Tom Mandrake	
Batman - The '80s	October 2011	Mike W. Barr	Jerry Bingham	
Batman - The '90s	October 2011	Alan Grant	Norm Breyfogle	
The Flash - The '70s	September 2011	Cary Bates	Benito Gallego and Sal Buscema	
The Flash - The '80s	October 2011	William Messner-Loebs	Greg LaRocque	
The Flash - The '90s	October 2011	Brian Augustyn	Mike Bowden and Joe Seung	
Green Lantern - The '70s	September 2011	Dennis O'Neil	Mike Grell	
Green Lantern - The '80s	October 2011	Len Wein	Joe Staton and Andy Owens	
Green Lantern - The '90s	October 2011	Ron Marz	Darryl Banks and Terry Austin	
Justice League - The '70s	September 2011	Cary Bates	Gordon Purcell and Andy Smith	
Justice League - The '80s	October 2011	Gerry Conway	Ron Randall	
Justice League - The '90s	October 2011	Keith Giffen and J. M. DeMatteis	Kevin Maguire	
Superman - The '70s	September 2011	Martin Pasko	Eduardo Barreto and Christian Duce	
Superman - The '80s	October 2011	Marv Wolfman	Sergio Cariello	
Superman - The '90s	October 2011	Louise Simonson	Jon Bogdanove	
Wonder Woman - The '70s	September 2011	Dennis O'Neil	J. Bone	
Wonder Woman - The '80s	October 2011	Roy Thomas	Rich Buckler and Joe Rubinstein	
Wonder Woman - The '90s	October 2011	William Messner-Loebs	Lee Moder and Dan Green	

== Collected editions ==
- Tales of the Batman: Len Wein includes Batman - The '70s, 640 pages, December 2014 (ISBN 978-1401251543)
- Justice League of America: The Detroit Era Omnibus includes Justice League - The '80s, 1,040 pages, December 2017 (ISBN 978-1401276850)
- The DC Universe by Len Wein includes Green Lantern - The '80s, 384 pages, February 2019 (ISBN 978-1401287887)
