= Anarky (comic book) =

Comic book series

- Cover of Anarky, vol. 1, #1 (May 1997), art by Norm Breyfogle.

Publication information
- Publisher: DC Comics
- Schedule: Monthly
- Format: (vol. 1); Limited series (vol. 2); Ongoing series
- Publication date: (vol. 1); May - August 1997 (vol. 2); May - December 1999
- No. of issues: (vol. 1): 4 (vol. 2): 8
- Main character: Anarky

Creative team
- Created by: Alan Grant; Norm Breyfogle
- Written by: Alan Grant
- Penciller: Norm Breyfogle
- Inker: Josef Rubinstein
- Letterer: John Costanza
- Colorist: Noelle Giddings
- Editor: Darren Vincenzo

Collected editions
- Batman: Anarky: ISBN 1-56389-437-8

Anarky was an American comic book series published by DC Comics, as a limited series between May and August of 1997, and as an ongoing series between May and December of 1999. It was written by Alan Grant, with pencils by Norm Breyfogle, and inks by Josef Rubinstein. The comic was a spin-off title derived from the Batman franchise, and followed the adventures of Anarky, an antagonist of the Batman character.

Although Anarky had originally been created to reflect the philosophy of anarchism, the primary influence on both volumes was Neo-Tech, a philosophy developed by Frank R. Wallace. The comic was overtly political in nature, exploring a number of themes including antimilitarism, homelessness, and political corruption.

== Publication history ==
=== Anarky ===
Following the comic book industry crash of 1996, Norm Breyfogle was unemployed and looking for work. As a result of a request Breyfogle made to DC for employment, Darren Vincenzo, then an editorial assistant at DC Comics, suggested multiple projects which Breyfogle could take part in. Among his suggestions was an Anarky limited series, written by Grant, which was eventually the project decided upon.

The four-issue limited series, Anarky, was published in May 1997. Entitled "Metamorphosis", the story maintained the character's anti-authoritarian sentiments, but was instead based on the philosophy of Neo-Tech, an offshoot of Objectivism.

During the climax of the "Anarky" storyline of Batman: Shadow of the Bat #41-42, it is implied that Anarky dies in a large explosion. In turn, the Anarky limited series resolved this event by revealing that Anarky survives, but chooses to shed the encumbrance of his double life by faking his death. Anarky works in seclusion to further his goal of achieving a utopian society, briefly hiring Legs and other homeless men to monitor Batman's movements. He has several further brushes with Batman, as well as the likes of Etrigan the Demon and Darkseid.

Grant has referred to the limited series as one of his favorite projects, and ranked it among his "career highlights".

=== Anarky (vol. 2) ===
With the success of the first Anarky miniseries, Darren Vincenzo suggested continuing the book as an ongoing series to Breyfogle and Grant. Although Grant was concerned that such a series would not be viable, he agreed to write it at Breyfogle's insistence, as the illustrator was still struggling for employment. Grant's primary concerns centered on his belief that Anarky's role as a non-superpowered teenager was not capable of competing for reader attention when DC Comics already had a similar series in Robin. Further, while potential disagreements with editors over story elements were not among his initial concerns, he eventually found himself constantly at odds with editors and editorial assistants throughout the creation of the series.

During the Anarky series, much of the character's development was influenced by the nature of Grant and Breyfogle's association. As part of the story writing process, the duo would engage in philosophical discussion carried out entirely over fax-transmissions. These long, in-depth, and occasionally heated debates influenced plot points, as well as the general direction of Anarky's character development.

Scheduled for a release date of November 1998, the premiere issue was rescheduled for March 1999, to coincide with the creation of a trade paperback, Batman: Anarky, to help promote the new series. Collecting several of the character's printed appearances, Batman: Anarky was released in February 1999. However, the release date for the second volume was then pushed back again to May. An unintended result of this constant rescheduling was the effect it had on Grant's efforts to plot early story lines for the series. Due to increasing time constraints for the approaching millennium, it prevented Grant from exploring potential plots involving the Y2K bug he discussed with Breyfogle. Grant also reported that the series was dogged by editorial restrictions, including demands that he include cameos for particular characters, or "tone down" the degree of philosophy of the series. One of the earliest of these editorial mandates was that Grant was ordered to completely rewrite the first three-issue story line, and remove Anarky from Gotham City in the first issue. This was achieved by explaining that following an earthquake in Gotham Lonnie's parents disappear, their house is destroyed, and he is threatened by Batman to leave the city. As one of many refugees who escapes from No Man's Land, he relocates to a new base of operations beneath the Washington Monument. Extremely displeased with the forced approach in creating this justification, Grant later said: "Reading over that I was not so happy with the way I’d written that because it didn’t make sense to me at the time and it doesn't make sense now". These constant impositions on the part of editors nearly drove Grant to quit the series, but he continued the project for Breyfogle's benefit: "I was all for walking away, but artist Norm had a mortgage and family, and basically needed the work".

Grant's doubts concerning the comic's prospects eventually proved correct. The series was panned by critics, failed to catch on among readers, and was canceled after eight issues, but Grant has noted in an interview that it was popular in Spanish speaking countries, perhaps owing to a history of political repression in the region: "It didn’t sit too well with American readers, who prefer the soap opera and cool costume aspects of superhero comics. But I became a minor hero in many Latin countries, like Argentina and Mexico, where readers had been subjected to tyranny and fascism and knew precisely what I was writing about".

=== Final issue controversy ===
Cover of Anarky, vol. 2,#8 (December 1999), art by Norm Breyfogle. The tagline reads, "Your name is Anarky. One of these guys is your father. Have a nice life!"

Despite numerous editorial impositions, the most controversial plot point was not a mandate, but was instead a suggestion by Breyfogle, intended as a means to expand Anarky's characterization: that Anarky's biological father be revealed to be the Joker. Breyfogle expressed an interest using the relationship as a source for internal conflict in the character: "...I figured that because Anarky represents the epitome of reason, one of the biggest crises he could face would be to discover that his father was the exact opposite: a raving lunatic!" Alternatively, Grant saw it as an opportunity to solidify Anarky's role in the Batman franchise. Grant's decision to pursue the suggestion ran into conflict with Dennis O'Neil, who protested against it. According to Grant:

Denny only let me write that story under protest, he was totally opposed to Joker being Anarky’s father and said under no circumstances would DC allow that ... I talked him into letting me write the script anyway by saying the story would create a lot of interest and then maybe in six months time I would write the rebuttal, which proves that Anarky wasn’t the Joker’s son ... and Denny said OK but of course the monthly title got cancelled long before that point.

Pressing forward, Grant wrote the Anarky series with the intention of allowing the storyline to play out over time. As the first issue narrates, Anarky begins a search for his missing parents in Anarky (vol. 2) #1, and comes upon evidence that the Machins are not his biological parents, that his mother is insane and that his father is a "madman". As revealed in Anarky (vol. 2) #8, his leads point to the possibility that his biological father is the Joker. He first meets his supposed biological mother, but finds that she is clinically unstable and unable to answer his questions. He then breaks into Arkham Asylum to confront the Joker himself, but is betrayed, as the Joker opportunistically attempts to escape from the asylum without providing any firm answers.

As the last issue of the Anarky series, this unresolved ending left open the possibility that the Joker might be Anarky's actual father, and the planned "rebuttal" was never published. Further, Grant and Breyfogle later speculated that, as Dennis O'Neil has retired from DC Comics, and the final editorial decision currently belongs to Dan DiDio, it is no longer possible to be sure whether a rebuttal will ever be published. As of 2010, there is yet no record of Didio ever commenting on the subject, though the timeline chronologically prevents the Joker from being Anarky's biological father, as the character is (currently) approximately 16 years old, while both Batman and the Joker have only existed for approximately 13 years.

As Anarky was created while Grant and Breyfogle were operating under "work-for-hire" rules, DC Comics owns all rights to the Anarky character. Following the cancellation of the Anarky series, both men attempted to buy the rights to Anarky from the company, but their offer was declined.

While Grant has commented that the first volume stands among his favorite works, he did not wish to create the ongoing series. Convinced by Norm Breyfogle to continue the series, he chafed under what he felt were excessive demands made by editors for specific plot changes, such as "toning down" Anarky's philosophy and including cameos for Superman, the Haunted Tank, and the Justice League.

One of the earliest of these was that Grant was "made to" remove Anarky from Gotham City. This was achieved by explaining that following an earthquake in Gotham Lonnie's parents disappeared, their house was destroyed, and he was threatened by Batman to leave the city. As one of many refugees who escaped from No Man's Land, he relocated to a new base of operations beneath the Washington Monument:

...during the (No Man's Land) story line, when Gotham was devastated by an earthquake, for reasons which I could not make rational or logical in the story, Batman sought out Anarky and told him he had to leave the city or Batman would come down on him like two tons of concrete. It didn’t make sense. You’d think if Gotham was in pieces then Batman would want all the help he could get. But he threw Anarky out of the city and just disappeared for months...Reading over that I was not so happy with the way I’d written that because it didn’t make sense to me at the time and it doesn’t make sense now. That’s what happens when you let editorial assistants come up with story ideas rather than the guy who’s getting paid to do the writing.

— Alan Grant, Alan Grant & Norm Breyfogle, 2006

Grant considered abandoning the project, but continued it for Breyfogle's sake, as the illustrator was still struggling for employment.

The second volume was heavily criticized by reviewers and failed to catch on among readers, until it was announced in issue #7 that it would be cancelled due to poor sales following issue #8. At the time of cancellation, two issues had been fully written and illustrated, but remain unpublished. These were intended to include an encounter with Superman, a story arch set in East Timor, and a confrontation with Capital Eagle, a new antagonist for Anarky that had been created by Grant and introduced earlier that year. Despite poor sales in the U.S., Grant noted that it was popular among philosophy students and sold well in Latin American countries, particularly Mexico and Argentina, perhaps owing to a history of political repression in the region.

=== Controversy ===
The series ended in controversy when the final issue suggested that Anarky was the biological son of the Joker. Originally a suggestion by Norm Breyfogle, the idea was advanced by Alan Grant as an attempt to solidify Anarky's role as a part of the Batman mythos. The idea was protested against by Dennis O'Neil, who only allowed the publication of the story to take place after Grant negotiated a compromise.

Denny only let me write that story under protest, he was totally opposed to Joker being Anarky’s father and said under no circumstances would DC allow that ... I talked him into letting me write the script anyway by saying the story would create a lot of interest and then maybe in six months time I would write the rebuttal, which proves that Anarky wasn't the Joker’s son ... and Denny said OK but of course the monthly title got cancelled long before that point."

With the series' cancellation taking place before the rebuttal could be produced, the story has been neither challenged nor confirmed for many years (as of 2008). After a period of several years in obscurity, Anarky was briefly "returned" to DC publications in 2005, when James Peatty wrote an issue of Green Arrow in which Anarky guest-starred. When interviewed about the story, Peaty noted the importance of Anarky's parentage on his interpretation of the character, alluding the final issue of the Anarky series. Although Peaty expressed a desire to continue using Anarky in other stories, he eventually became employed by Marvel Comics and Anarky returned to a second period of obscurity. Grant and Breyfogle later speculated that with Dennis O'Neil's retirement, and with the final editorial decision now belonging to Dan DiDio, it is no longer possible to be sure whether a rebuttal will ever be published. There is currently no record of DiDio ever commenting on the subject.

When asked if fans desired "change" in comic books, Alan Grant submitted: "publishers want the illusion of change, rather than change itself". He then referenced the final issue of Anarky, and quoted an unnamed senior DC Comics official who he claimed had told him: "'Anarky will never be the Joker's son. You can write the story, but someone else will write the sequel showing it just can't be'".

In an overview of the issue, "The Unofficial Guide to the DC Universe" notes that the DC Universe timeline chronologically prevents the Joker from being Anarky's biological father, as the character is (currently) approximately 16 years old, while both Batman and the Joker have only existed for approximately 13 years.

== Plot synopsis ==
=== "Metamorphosis" ===
Volume 1, issues #1–4

The story describes that Lonnie Machin narrowly survived an explosion which faked his death in Batman: Shadow of the Bat #40 - 41 (July - August 1995). Several months later, he has begun a new plan to liberate the world of government. As Anarky, he attempts to create a device which will emit beams of light on frequencies which will trigger the human brain of all who see it. The people will then be "de-brainwashed" of all the social constraints which society has placed on the individual. Utilizing a makeshift teleportation device capable of summoning a boom tube, he begins a quest to capture the power sources the device will need: the madness of Etrigan the Demon, the evil of Darkseid, and the goodness of Batman. During the confrontation between Anarky and Batman, the device is damaged. Thus, when Machin activates it, it only affects himself. The vision that follows reveals what may have happened if he had succeeded, with nightmarish consequences. The conclusion of the story is that if society is to change, individuals must accept that change voluntarily. When Batman turns off the machine, Anarky awakens and promptly escapes, vowing to continue his mission, "until they all learn to choose for themselves".

=== "Aberration!" ===
Artwork for the cover of Anarky, vol. 2,#1 (May 1999), art by Norm Breyfogle. The illustration features multiple figures and plot elements which appear during the "Aberration!" story arc.

Volume 2, issues #1–3

Taking place during the No Man's Land story arc, 16-year-old Lonnie Machin, a.k.a. Anarky, is chased from the ruins of Gotham City by Batman, who refuses to face Anarky in a turf war over the city. With financial independence and technical genius, Anarky invents his new ally, MAX, an artificially intelligent computer, and uses his teleportation device and wealth to reestablish a secret base below the Washington Monument. He then begins a war against supervillains and the United States Government, while simultaneously searching for his parents, who disappeared in the aftermath of the Cataclysm story arc. During research, Anarky mathematically predicts the eventual appearance of an "Aberration", an anomaly of physics that will destroy the planet, and steals a Green Lantern power ring to combat it. This draws the attention of Kyle Rayner, who attempts to regain the ring before teaming up with Anarky against the Aberration. Near the end, Anarky is nearly seduced by the power of the ring and tempted to keep it, but comes to the conclusion that "power corrupts" and opts to return it, only for the ring to be destroyed during the battle. As an epilogue, MAX uncovers evidence that the Machins adopted Lonnie as an infant, and that his real father is "a madman". The mystery of the alleged father's identity becomes a recurring subplot of the series until the final issue.

=== "War and Peace" ===
Volume 2, issues #4–6

Anarky stumbles upon a black market transaction between a US senator and anonymous henchmen, and disrupts their meeting. He discovers that the senator was selling codes that revealed coordinates of bio-warfare factories in Iraq, and later that Ra's al Ghul was the buyer. The international terrorist's goal is to launch missiles against the factories from Israel, releasing clouds of deadly bacteria and sparking a war in the Middle East, the result of which would be a death toll in the millions. Ra's al Ghul eventually obtains the codes and launches his missiles. However, Anarky supplies him with the incorrect codes and the missiles land harmlessly over the desert. He then uses the Internet to alert the world to the plot, which results in the missile sites being discovered and destroyed by US warplanes. As an epilogue to the story, a secret meeting is held by key members of the federal government in the White House. The threat Anarky represents to the men attending is discussed, and it is decided that Mr. Staines, a mysterious figure employed by the federal government, would be charged with the task of neutralizing him. Mr. Staines suggests the use of Capital Eagle, a government employed superhuman, to defeat Anarky.

=== "When Johnny Comes Marching Home" ===
Volume 2, issue #7

A tie-in to the Day of Judgment crossover event, Anarky encounters The Haunted Tank and teams up with its crew to defeat an army of zombies rising from Arlington National Cemetery. Anarky also encounters various Founding Fathers in the process. The story carries a strong anti-war message, and ends when Anarky, demoralized by the sight of pointless fighting among men from every war in US history, refuses to fight and abandons the battlefield.

=== "The Sins of the Father" ===
Volume 2, issue #8

Taking place after the No Man's Land story arc, Lonnie Machin decides to finally confront his supposed biological parents to uncover the truth of his lineage. He first meets with his alleged biological mother, Greta Mitchell, but finds that she is mentally unbalanced, due to the side effects of Joker venom she was exposed to years earlier. In a flashback, she tells the story of how she became pregnant by the Joker, and that due to her condition she was deemed unfit for parental responsibility and that her child was taken away from her. However, Lonnie is unable to get any more information from her. As a final recourse, Anarky breaks into Arkham Asylum using his teleporter and confronts his alleged father, now revealed to be the Joker. Meanwhile, the Joker is in the midst of a prison break with other inmates, and takes advantage of the situation to steal the teleporter, and then forces Anarky to participate. Unarmed, Anarky plays along until he manages to regain the teleporter to escape, without the Joker having given him any clear answers either. Although the story presents no evidence, Anarky asserts that he personally believes the Joker is his father, and fears that someday he may become insane as well.

== Characters ==
- Anarky (Lonnie Machin): a teenage polymath and anarchist vigilante named Lonnie Machin. Anarky uses his intelligence and wealth to wage a war against supervillains and the government. He is the main character of both series, and was originally featured as an antagonist in various Batman comics. He is stated to be 15 years old during the events of the first volume, and 16 years old during the second.

First volume guest appearances

Originally produced as a limited series, the first volume of Anarky utilized previously established characters to guest star in each issue.

- Legs: a homeless Vietnam veteran, and resident of the streets of Gotham City. Legs is ironically named for his missing limbs, which he lost due to an anti-personnel mine explosion in the Vietnam War. He is loyal to Lonnie Machin, and supports his activity as Anarky. Anarky hires him and other homeless men to act as spies on Batman.
- Etrigan the Demon (Jason Blood): a demon bound to the human Jason Blood. Anarky summons a malevolent demon in an effort to lure Etrigan into a confrontation. Probing Etrigan on the nature of evil, Anarky steals some energy from him, then receives a warning from Blood foretelling the future.
- Darkseid: a tyrannical dictator of the planet Apokolips, and possessor of the Omega Force. He is the most feared member of the order of New Gods. Anarky travels to the planet Apokolips, asks Darkseid about the nature of evil, and secretly steals some of the New God's power.
- Batman (Bruce Wayne): the vigilante protector of Gotham City, and Anarky's longstanding opponent. Batman investigates Anarky's activity, and eventually confronts the boy at a high-rise tower, foiling Anarky's plot to "save the world".

Second volume cast of characters

New characters were introduced in the second volume with the intention that they would become regular cast members and receive more character development in future issues. However, due to the short run of the series, most of the original characters appeared in a limited number of scenes, with MAX being the only character to appear in every issue. Three characters – Roach, Mr. Stains, and Capital Eagle – were intended to appear in two unpublished issues.

- MAX: a supercomputer possessing artificial intelligence, its name is an acronym standing for "Multi-Augmented X-Program". It is created by Anarky and is situated on-board Anarky's suit, where it functions as an assistant. Charged with scouring the internet for information regarding Anarky's lost parents, it discovers that he was adopted at a young age, and that his father is "a madman". It first appears in Anarky (vol. 2) #1 (May 1999).
- Roach: a homeless, teenage girl, she earns money by wiping car windshields at street corners. She is well known among other homeless people of Washington DC, and lives among them. Despite Anarky's good intentions to help her, she assaults him twice in an effort to steal money. She first appears in Anarky (vol. 2) #1 (May 1999).
- Lieutenant Ryne: a police officer who Anarky rescues on two occasions, he reciprocates by saving Anarky from an attack by Kyle Rayner. He is earnest in his work, fully believing in upholding the law. He first appears in Anarky (vol. 2) #2 (June 1999).
- Capital Eagle: a government employed superhuman, he receives no character development during the brief series, but was intended to appear in later issues as an antagonist set against Anarky. In an unpublished issue of the series, he is revealed to be Joe Public from the Bloodlines event, portrayed as possessing super-human strength and durability. He first appears in DCU Heroes: Secret Files and Origins #1 (February 1999).
- Mr. Staines: a mysterious figure employed by the federal government, he is charged by anonymous politicians to spearhead the arrest of Anarky. He first appears in Anarky (vol. 2) #6 (October 1999). Mr. Staines was later featured in a Batman one-shot issue, Batman: Dreamland, by Alan Grant and Norm Breyfogle. The story presents Mr. Stains as an enigmatic scientist spearheading a top secret, black budget, mind control program in "Dreamland" (a.k.a. Area 51). Staines is represented as an idealist who believes that society can be rid of war, crime, and chaos if the minds of individuals are controlled by authority figures.

== Themes ==
Interior artwork from Anarky#3 (July 1997). Anarky lectures his dog in a thematic interior splash page. Written by Alan Grant, each issue of the first series contained a part of the sequence, illustrated by Breyfogle to create a single poster when combined.

While previously the character Anarky had been described as an anarchist, both volumes were instead based on the philosophy of Neo-Tech, an offshoot of Objectivism. It is unique as the only mainstream comic book ever influenced by this philosophy.

A recurring theme in the first volume included four scenes, at one page per issue, in which Anarky expounded philosophy to his pet dog, and indirectly for the reader, including explaining a bicameralism of the mind, the difference between Plato and Aristotle, a concept of "economic parasites", and how the elimination of irrationality would allow society to advance. In an interview, Alan Grant explained that in the original script, these monologues were titled "The History of Consciousness part 1 through 4", and that Norm Breyfogle designed the illustrations so that a single quarter of a Circle-A would act as a backdrop to each, which when placed together created a complete poster image. This theme was not utilized in the second volume, but story narration continued to allude to these concepts. Bicameralism and philosophy of the mind remained a topic of concern to Grant while writing the series, which Grant hoped could act as a vehicle for his thoughts on the origin of consciousness. The comparison between Plato and Aristotle had been used in two earlier stories which featured Anarky, although at the time the character was described as an anarchist.

Because comic books feature characters who embody the two extremes, the medium is an ideal arena for Mr. Grant's philosophic foray.

— Line of Fire Reviews: Anarky #2

Several of the issues contained strong anti-war messages, including issue #6. Near the conclusion of the War and Peace storyline, a brief scene is shown in which Lonnie Machin uses the internet to hold an instant messaging session with the public in which he debates the need for war, arguing that money and time used on military research would be better spent on agriculture to solve the global overpopulation crisis.

The series also introduced atheist leanings into the character's portrayal, coinciding with Grant's Neo-Tech philosophy.

Political messages were also occasionally displayed in the backgrounds of scenes, as graffiti or fluttering newspapers displaying politically charged headlines which alluded to social problems, such as white collar crime and homelessness. For his part, Norm Breyfogle believed that his role in producing the comic was merely that of artist, and so felt that his contribution to the comic's themes were minimal. Of them he expressed: "The series was quite obviously subversive. But as an artist I was just drawing Alan's stories. I wouldn’t say that I was being particularly subversive, although I was a bit when I put graffiti on the walls in the backgrounds".

== Media information ==
=== List of Anarky issues ===
Volume 1

- "Metamorphosis, Part 1: Does a Dog Have a Buddha Nature?" Anarky, vol. 1, no. 1 (May 1997). New York City: DC Comics.
- "Metamorphosis, Part 2: Revolution Number 9" Anarky, vol. 1, no. 2 (June 1997). New York City: DC Comics.
- "Metamorphosis, Part 3: The Economics of The Madhouse" Anarky, vol. 1, no. 3 (July 1997). New York City: DC Comics.
- "Metamorphosis, Part 4: Fanfare for the Common Man" Anarky, vol. 1, no. 4 (August 1997). New York City: DC Comics.

Volume 2

- "Aberration! Part One: Power Play" Anarky, vol. 2, no. 1 (May 1999). New York City: DC Comics.
- "Aberration! Part One: Green for Danger" Anarky, vol. 2, no. 2 (June 1999). New York City: DC Comics.
- "Aberration! Part One: Wishing Well" Anarky, vol. 2, no. 3 (July 1999). New York City: DC Comics.
- "War and Peace, Part I" Anarky, vol. 2, no. 4 (August 1999). New York City: DC Comics.
- "War and Peace, Part II" Anarky, vol. 2, no. 5 (September 1999). New York City: DC Comics.
- "War and Peace, Part III" Anarky, vol. 2, no. 6 (October 1999). New York City: DC Comics.
- "When Johnny Comes Marching Home" Anarky, vol. 2, no. 7 (November 1999). New York City: DC Comics.
- "The Sins of the Father" Anarky, vol. 2, no. 8 (December 1999). New York City: DC Comics.

=== Collected editions ===
#
Title
Publisher
Year
ISBN
Reprints
N/A
Batman: Anarky
DC Comics
1999
ISBN 1-56389-437-8
Collects

The reprinted material is, in whole or in part, from:

Anarky #1–4 (May–August 1997).
Credits and full notes

Writer(s)	Alan Grant
Penciller(s)	Norm Breyfogle
Inker(s)	Josef Rubinstein
Colorist(s)	Noelle Giddings
Letterer(s)	John Costanza
Editor(s)	Darren Vincenzo
A British edition was published by Titan Books (1999); ISBN 1-85286-995-X

== See also ==
- Anarcho-capitalist literature, an article on the tradition of anti-government, pro-free market literature
- Libertarian science fiction, an article on the tradition of science fiction influenced by libertarian philosophy
- Mr. A, a superhero created to represent Objectivist philosophy
- The Question, a second superhero created to represent objectivist philosophy
