= Red Hood vs. Anarky =

American comic book one-shot

- Cover to the one-shot.

Publication information
- Publication date: June 20, 2018
- No. of issues: 1
- Main character(s): Jason Todd

Creative team
- Created by: Tim Seeley
- Written by: Tim Seeley
- Artist(s): Javi Fernandez
- Letterer(s): Dave Sharpe
- Colorist(s): John Kalisz

Batman Prelude to the Wedding: Red Hood vs. Anarky or simple as Red Hood vs. Anarky is a 2018 comic book one-shot published by DC Comics. The comic depicts the character Anarky trying to crash Selina Kyle's bachelorette party all the while Jason Todd (Red Hood) is running security. It was written by Tim Seeley and illustrated by Javi Fernandez.

== Publication history ==
The one-shot is part of a line named Batman: Prelude to the Wedding which were made to build up the wedding of Batman and Catwoman. It was published along with Robin vs. Ra's al Ghul, Nightwing vs. Hush, Batgirl vs. the Riddler and Harley Quinn vs. the Joker.

Seely expressed that he decided to pair up Red Hood and Anarky because he feels that they are similar characters, where he said: "To me, what made that interesting is that Red Hood is the bad seed of the family, to some degree. And I can play that against Anarky, who in some ways, could be a fallen member of the Bat family. The way that James [Tynion] played Anarky in Detective Comics is he shared a lot of the same goals and motivations with the [Gotham Knights] team, but he's also a guy who has a tendency to run afoul of Batman's beliefs". He wanted Fernandez for the art because he believed that Fernandez was capable of a darker style that fit his story.

== Plot ==
In the story, Jason Todd, as Red Hood, has been pursuing a more brutal approach to crime-fighting, distancing himself from Batman's no-kill rule. On the other hand, Anarky is a vigilante with anti-authoritarian beliefs who aims to dismantle corrupt systems and bring about social change. Though both are acting as vigilantes in Gotham, their methods and goals conflict.

The plot revolves around Anarky attempting to incite chaos in the city to expose the flaws in Gotham's power structure, hoping to inspire the citizens to rise up. Red Hood opposes Anarky's plan because of the potential harm to innocent people caught in the crossfire. Their battle becomes both physical and ideological, with Red Hood representing a more cynical, pragmatic approach to justice, while Anarky believes in radical change through disruption and anarchy.

The tension between them is heightened by their shared history with Batman, as both characters have been shaped by the Dark Knight's teachings but ultimately reject his philosophy in different ways. The conflict explores themes of justice, morality, and the consequences of taking matters into one's own hands in a broken system.

The story ends with neither truly winning but each gaining a better understanding of the other's perspective, leaving open the question of which path is ultimately more effective in creating lasting change in Gotham.

== Reception ==
The reviews for Batman Prelude to the Wedding: Red Hood vs. Anarky #1 are generally mixed, with both praise and criticism. Bleeding Cool highlights the comic's blend of humor, action, and political commentary, particularly focusing on Red Hood's battle against a group of white supremacist incels orchestrated by Anarky. The review appreciates Jason Todd's attempts to resolve the conflict without excessive violence, and praises the gritty artwork for enhancing the story's tone. Similarly, GeekDad and ComicsVerse commend the pacing and action, noting that while the comic isn't groundbreaking, it's still an enjoyable read.

On the other hand, That's Entertainment and CBR are more critical of Anarky's role, feeling that the character isn't fully utilized and comes across as a minor threat compared to the bigger villains like Ra’s al Ghul and Joker. They also suggest the story misses an opportunity to dive deeper into Jason Todd's complicated relationship with Batman, especially given the importance of Bruce's wedding. Inverse, while appreciating the relevance of the political themes, particularly the fight against incels, notes that this aspect might overshadow deeper character development.

== See also ==
- List of Batman comics
- List of DC Comics publications
- Publication history of Anarky
