= Anarky in Gotham City =

1989 comic book story arc

- Anarky's debut, in Detective Comics #608. Artist Norm Breyfogle later included the cover among a gallery of his favorite works.
- Publisher: DC Comics
- Publication date: November – December 1989
- Genre: Anarchist, detective, philosophical, politicalSuperhero
- Title(s): Detective Comics #608 - #609
- Main characters: Batman; Anarky

Creative team
- Writer: Alan Grant
- Penciller: Norm Breyfogle
- Inker: Steve Mitchell
- Letterer: Todd Klein
- Colorist: Adrienne Roy
- Editors: Denny O'Neil; Dan Raspler (associate editor)

"Anarky in Gotham City" is a two-part comic book story arc which appeared in Detective Comics #608, in November 1989, and was continued the following month in Detective Comics #609. The arc was written by Alan Grant and illustrated by Norm Breyfogle, with editorial oversight by Dennis O'Neil. Coloring by Adrienne Roy and lettering by Todd Klein contributed to the interior artwork.

"Anarky in Gotham City" introduced a character created by Grant, Anarky, as a vehicle for presenting the philosophy of anarchism to the DC Universe. An anarchist himself at the time, Grant was interested in how the philosophy would interact with the world of superheroics he wrote monthly. In the years to follow, Grant would reuse Anarky in Batman-related comic books whenever he desired to make a political point.

Well received at the time of its publication, the story was also praised by comic book contributors, including illustrator Norm Breyfogle, who came to appreciate the character as his favorite of Alan Grant's creations.

== Production ==
=== Conception of Anarky ===
Originally inspired by his personal political leanings, Alan Grant entertained the idea of interjecting anarchist philosophy into Batman comic books. In an attempt to emulate the success of Chopper, a rebellious youth in Judge Dredd, he conceptualized a character as a twelve-year-old anarchist vigilante, who readers would sympathize with despite the character's harsh methods. Creating the character without any consultation from his partner, illustrator Norm Breyfogle, his only instructions to Breyfogle were that Anarky be designed as a cross between V and the black spy from Mad magazine's Spy vs. Spy. Grant also briefly considered incorporating Krazy Kat as a third design suggestion, but decided against the idea. In response to deadline pressures, and not recognizing the character's potential, Breyfogle "made no preliminary sketches, simply draping him in long red sheets". The character was also intended to wear a costume that disguised his youth, and so was fitted with a crude "head extender" that elongated his neck, creating a jarring appearance. While both of these design elements have since been dropped, more enduring aspects of the character have been his golden face mask, "priestly" hat, and his golden sceptre.

=== Script rewrite ===
In Grant's earliest script for the character, Anarky was designed to be far more vicious, and to have killed his first victim. Dennis O'Neil, then editor of Detective Comics, requested that Grant "tone down" the script, as he felt Anarky becoming a murderer at such a young age was morally reprehensible. Grant consented to the request and the script was rewritten. In a 2004 interview, Grant explained the motivation behind this early decision: "I wanted to play it that way because it created incredible tension in Anarky himself. Other heroes might kill—Batman used to, in the early days—but for a teenager to rationally decide to take lives...well, it hadn't been handled in comics before. But Denny was boss, and I respected his opinion and toned things down".

Grant later expressed relief that he had not fully committed to portraying Anarky as a potential murderer, as he felt "Anarky would have compromised his own beliefs if he had taken the route of the criminal-killer". Despite Anarky's non-lethal portrayal, entries for the character in Who's Who in the DC Universe, The DC Comics Encyclopedia, and The Supervillain Book, have falsely referred to Anarky as having killed criminals in early appearances. Norm Breyfogle was also under the false impression that Anarky had killed for several years, having failed to realize the original script for Anarky's debut storyline had been rewritten. Grant eventually explained the situation to Breyfogle in 2006, during a joint interview.

== Story ==
=== Synopsis ===
- "Anarky in Gotham City Part 1: Letters to the Editor"

Anarky assaults a security guard in "Anarky in Gotham City". Dialogue expresses the character's political views: "Running dog lackey of the capitalist conspiracy? Victim of socio-economic forces beyond your control? Whatever—sleep it off!" Illustration by Norm Breyfogle.

During a late night drug raid, Batman, the vigilante protector of Gotham City, discovers that the drug dealer he was tracking has already been assaulted and left for police to find. Next to his unconscious body is a spray painted Circle-A, announcing the arrival of a new vigilante, Anarky. Anarky continues his war against crime by targeting a business owner dumping pollutants in a river. Batman recognizes his M.O. and realizes he is attacking people based on the complaints raised in letters to the editor in a local newspaper. He is established as an uncommonly philosophical and intelligent twelve-year-old.

- "Anarky in Gotham City Part 2: Facts About Bats"

Batman alerts the police, who plan stake-outs at several events based on the letters. When Anarky strikes next, however, it is at a construction site unlisted in the paper. Anarky rallies the homeless to riot in response to the destruction of their "Cardboard City", which has been bulldozed to build a new bank. Batman arrives but is attacked by the homeless mob so that Anarky may flee. The mob includes Legs, a homeless Vietnam veteran who Alan Grant would utilize as a partner for Anarky in future stories.

The narrative climax unfolds as Anarky and Batman come to blows, and during their brief fight, Batman deduces that Anarky is too fragile to be an adult. Homeless rioters come to Anarky's aid, allowing his escape. Fleeing into Mike Machin's workplace, Batman finds Machin holding Anarky's costume. Lonnie's father confesses to being Anarky, but Batman ignores him and tracks Anarky's hidden location, revealing him to be a disguised, twelve-year-old paperboy named Lonnie Machin.

The debut story of the character failed to provide a back story to explain his behavior, but exposition from Batman during the narrative dénouement posits that Anarky is guided by socially consciousness and arrogance. As a child prodigy with extensive knowledge of both radical philosophy and improvised munitions, Lonnie was confident that violent change is necessary to improve social conditions. Convinced that he must accomplish this, he becomes a vigilante and fashions weapons—a stun baton and smoke bombs—in labs at school. Batman ultimately condemns his actions, but expresses admiration for his idealism.

=== Themes ===
Highlighting their political conflict, the cover of Detective Comics #609 contrasts Anarky as a champion of the oppressed, and Batman as a champion of the law; art by Norm Breyfogle.

Lonnie Machin is introduced as "Anarky" as early as his first appearance in Detective Comics #608, withholding his origin story for a later point.

He goes to lengths to disguise his age and appearance by creating a costume with a false head to increase his height. This was in fact intended as a ruse on the part of writer Alan Grant to disguise the character's true identity, and to confuse the reader into believing Anarky to be an adult.

While the story presented Anarky as having a serious perspective, these were occasionally contrasted with moments of comedic levity in the form of youthful sarcasm and rebellion. Anarky's debut in "Anarchy in Gotham City" includes one such example, as Anarky spray paints a circle-A on Batman's cape, in mockery of the dark knight who has just captured him. Comic book industry critic Greg Burgas appreciated the contrasting attitudes presented in this debut, writing that "Lonnie is a fascinating character in that he has a sense of humor... and he's very smart".

=== Characters ===
- Batman: the vigilante protector of Gotham city, billionaire CEO Bruce Wayne investigates Anarky's activity, confronting and apprehending the child as Batman.
- Anarky: a child prodigy, and anarchist vigilante named Lonnie Machin. Anarky uses his intelligence create improvised weapons in school labs, and initiates a populist war on crime. He is stated to be twelve-years-old during the events of the story.
- James Gordon: the police commissioner of Gotham City, who acts as Batman's contact within the Police establishment.
- Legs: a homeless Vietnam veteran, and resident of the streets of Gotham City. Angered by his misfortunes, he and other homeless men support Anarky and are inspired to riot.

== Reception and impact ==
Although Grant had not created the character to be used beyond the two-part debut story, positive reactions from reader letters and his editor caused him to change his mind. He then decided to make Lonnie Machin the third Robin, following Jason Todd, desiring a new sidekick who would act as a foil to Batman, and not have the same motivations for vengeance. This was abandoned when he learned that Tim Drake had already been created to fill the role by Marv Wolfman. Quickly rebounding from this decision, Grant instead used the second appearance of Anarky as the antagonist for Tim Drake's first solo detective case.

=== Impact on DC Comics continuity ===
In the years following Anarky's creation, the character was rarely incorporated into Batman stories by Grant, being reserved for stories in which the author felt the need to make a philosophical point. Throughout the early 90s, Anarky was a lesser known, but established antagonist in the Batman franchise, frequently depicted as escaping from the detention center and peregrinating around Gotham City.

During this first confrontation, Anarky is aided by a band of homeless men, including Legs, a homeless cripple who becomes loyal to him and would assist him in later appearances. After being caught, Lonnie is locked away in a juvenile detention center.

== See also ==
- Anarchism and the arts, the tradition of anarchist influence on art mediums, including comics.
- Anarchy Comics, an underground comic anthology created by anarchist cartoonists.
- The Invisibles, a comic book series featuring anarchist influenced characters and philosophy.
- Trashman (comics), 1960s underground comix character influenced by anarchist and Marxist philosophy.
- List of comic book supervillain debuts
- List of fictional anarchists
