= Integrated Management Associates =

Publisher of books and articles

- Formerly: I & O Publishing; Neo-Tech Publishing; The League; The Secret Society
- Company type: Private
- Industry: Publishing; Direct marketing
- Founded: 1968
- Founder: Wallace Ward (Frank R. Wallace)
- Headquarters: Henderson, Nevada, United States
- Key people: Wallace H. Ward (Mark Hamilton)
- Products: Neo-Tech books; Neothink literature; Twelve Visions Party materials
- Website: neothink.com

Integrated Management Associates (also Neotech or Neothink) is a publisher and distributor of books and articles, based in Henderson, Nevada. It was founded by Wallace Ward, also known as Frank R. Wallace, and is now run by his son Wallace H. Ward under the name Mark Hamilton.

== History ==
The company was founded by Wallace Ward as I & 0 Publishing in 1968 to publish his own work written under a number of pen names, including Frank R. Wallace. Since Ward's death in 2006 the company has been run by his son, Wallace H. Ward, using the trademarked name Mark Hamilton.

== Operations ==
According to the Los Angeles Times IMA's business plan consists of sending advertising mail to hundreds of thousands of people, offering them free pamphlets explaining the "secrets of wealth and power" known to, e.g., Warren Buffett and Sumner Redstone. The ultimate goal is to convince recipients to purchase a copy of a 1200-page work by Hamilton for $135.50.

The book is about a woman, "Miss Annabelle," who has a number of super-intelligent children who manage to solve all the problems facing humanity, including death itself. One of Miss Annabelle's children is elected President of the United States under the aegis of the "Twelve Visions Party." Mark Hamilton is the founder of an actual American political party of the same name.

IMA has operated under a number of different names, including "Neo-Tech Publishing", "The Nouveau Tech Society", "Neothink Society", "The League", "The Secret Society," "The Society of Secrets", "Newly-Forming Neo-Tech/Illuminati Societies", and "The Athenian Secret Society". Authors have included Frank Wallace, Mark Hamilton, Eric Savage, Drew Ellis, Matt Keys, Brett Peters, Neil Lock, Carl Watner, Yasuhiko Kimura, and Ted Nicholas.
