= Adrienne Roy =

American comics colorist (1953–2010)

- Roy circa 2009
- Born: June 28, 1953
- Died: December 14, 2010 (aged 57) Austin, Texas, U.S.
- Area: Colourist
- Notable works: Batman; Detective Comics
- Spouse: Anthony Tollin 1976–19? (divorce)

Adrienne Roy (June 28, 1953 – December 14, 2010) was a comic book color artist who worked mostly for DC Comics. She was largely responsible for coloring the Batman line (Batman and Detective Comics) throughout the 1980s and early 1990s.

== Biography ==
Roy attended an art school in Wayne, New Jersey, where she studied painting techniques. Her first contact with comics was through collecting Marvel Comics' Tomb of Dracula, The Sub-Mariner, and Conan the Barbarian. Roy's first work as a comics colorist was assisting her then-husband Anthony Tollin, who worked for DC Comics at the time. Long-time colorist Jack Adler gave Roy her first job at DC: the cover of DC Special Series #8 (featuring the Batman, Deadman and Sgt. Rock team-up). Roy considered Adler and fellow colorist Sol Harrison her mentors; both trained her in coloring during her first years at DC.

Roy was also responsible for the coloring on many other titles during that time period: The New Teen Titans, The Warlord, Weird War Tales and Madame Xanadu. Nevertheless, she is predominantly known for her work on the Batman books: Batman, Detective Comics, Batman: Shadow of the Bat, Batman: Gotham Knights, and Robin.

When computerized colors arrived to comics, the assignments to classic colorists substantially decreased. By 2000, Roy was largely out of work, despite training herself on the computer. Roy died from cancer in Austin, Texas, at age 57 on December 14, 2010.

== Bibliography ==
Roy's comics work (interior art) include:

=== DC Comics ===
- Action Comics #483, 496, 500, 505-506 (Superman) (1978–1981)
- Action Comics Weekly #611–618 (Catwoman, 627–634 (Nightwing and Speedy) (1988-1989)
- Adventure Comics #459–466 (Aquaman, Green Lantern, Justice Society of America,Wonder Woman), 468–478 (Aquaman, Starman), 491–492 (Captain Marvel) (1978-1982)
- Adventures of the Outsiders #33–38 (1986)
- All-Out War #2 (1979)
- All Star Comics #71–74 (1978)
- All-Star Squadron #27 (1983)
- America vs. the Justice Society #1 (1985)
- Aquaman #61–63 (1978)
- Arak: Son of Thunder #2–50, Annual #1 (1981–1985)
- Armageddon 2001 #2 (1991)
- Atari Force #1-5 (1982–1983)
- Batman #0, 303, 305–306, 325–351, 353–401, 403, 408–421, 423–518, Annual #9-17 (1978–1995)
- Batman and the Outsiders #1–19, 21–32, Annual#1–2 (1983–1986)
- Batman Family #17-20 (1978)
- Batman Forever: The Official Comic Adaptation (1995)
- Batman Special #1 (1984)
- Batman: A Word to the Wise (1992)
- Batman: Gotham Nights #1-4 (1992)
- Batman: Gotham Nights II #1-4 (1995)
- Batman: Shadow of the Bat #0, 1–38, Annual #1 (1992–1995)
- Batman: Vengeance of Bane #1–2 (1993–1995)
- The Brave and the Bold #161, 163–170, 172–178, 180–181, 184–185, 187–189, 192–200 (1980–1983)
- Catwoman #1–4 (1989)
- Damage #18 (1995)
- DC Comics Presents #10–11 (Superman), 26 (New Teen Titans insert preview), 41 (Wonder Woman insert preview) (1979–1982)
- DC Special Series #8 (Batman, Deadman, and Sgt. Rock), 10 (Doctor Fate), 21 (Legion of Super-Heroes), 12, 22 (1978–1980)
- The Demon #1–2 (1987)
- Detective Comics #0, 480–509, 511–553, 555–567, 569–578, 580–587, 589–650, 652–684, Annual #1–3, 5–6 (1978–1995)
- Doorway to Nightmare #3–5 (1978)
- Firebrand #6 (1996)
- Firestorm #1–4 (1978)
- The Flash Annual #6 (1993)
- Fury of Firestorm #20–21 (1984)
- Ghosts #73–80, 82, 84, 86, 97, 104 (1979–1981)
- G.I. Combat #212, 214–224, 226–228, 231, 233–239 (1979–1982)
- Green Lantern #104–125, 134 (1978–1980)
- House of Mystery #259, 266, 282, 287, 290–291, 295, 297, 299–300, 302–304, 306–319 (1978–1983)
- Infinity, Inc. #2–5, 7–15, 18–21, Annual #1 (1984–1985)
- Jonni Thunder #2–4 (1985)
- Justice League of America #161–200 (1978–1982)
- Justice League Task Force #23–37 (1995–1996)
- Madame Xanadu #1 (1981)
- Manhunter #0–12 (1994-1995)
- Masters of the Universe #1–2 (1982–1983)
- Men of War #13 (1979)
- Mystery in Space #112, 115–117 (1980-1981)
- New Teen Titans #1–6, 8–22, 26–40, Annual #2
- New Teen Titans vol. 2 #1–49, Annual #1–4 (1980-1988)
- New Titans #50–71, 73–80, 82–93, 95–113, Annual #5–7 (1988–1994)
- Night Force #2, 4
- Night Force vol. 2 #1-5 (1982–1997)
- Nightwing Secret Files and Origins (1999)
- Nightwing: Alfred's Return (1995)
- Omega Men #10–11, 14, 16, 18, 22, Annual #1 (1984–1985)
- Outsiders #1–24, 26–28, Special (1985–1988)
- Power Lords #1, 3 (1983–1984)
- Ragman #2 (1991)
- Robin #1–5 (1991)
- Robin vol. 2 #0, 1–16, 18–73, 1,000,000, Annual #1–2 (1993–2000)
- Robin II #1–4 (1991–1992)
- Robin III #1–6 (1992–1993)
- Secret Origins #6 (Halo), 15 (Deadman), 46 (The New Teen Titans), 50 (Batman and Robin), Annual #3 (1986–1990)
- Secrets of Haunted House #36–37 (1981)
- Showcase #98–102 (1978)
- Showcase '93 #1–2 (1993)
- Showcase '96 #12 (1996)
- Slash Maraud #1–6 (1987–1988)
- Spectre vol. 2 #1–6, 9–14, 22 (1987–1989)
- Steel #2 (1978)
- Super Friends #19, 21–24, 26–27, 29–30, 32, Special #1 (1979–1981)
- Superboy and the Legion of Super-Heroes #237, 240, 249 (1978–1979)
- Superboy Plus The Power of Shazam! (1997)
- Superman #327–335, 346–359, 361–369 (1978–1982)
- The Superman Family #193,195–202, 204–207, 210–212 (1979–1981)
- Swamp Thing #1–4, 6–9 (Phantom Stranger back-ups), 57, Annual #3 (1982–1987)
- Swordquest #1–3 (1982)
- Tailgunner Jo #1, 3–6 (1988–1989)
- Tales of the New Teen Titans #1–4 (1982)
- Tales of the Teen Titans #41–58 (1984–-1985)
- Team Titans #1–24 (1992–1994)
- Teen Titans Spotlight #1, 3–7, 9–10, 12, 14, 18–20 (1986–1988)
- Time Masters #1–8 (1990)
- Time Warp #1, 4 (1979–1980)
- Titans Sell-Out Special (1992)
- Underworld #1 (1987)
- The Unexpected #199, 216 (1980–1981)
- Warlord #13–50, 52–70, 76, Annual #1 (1978–1983)
- Weird War Tales #74, 86–90, 92–94, 97–100, 102, 105, 108–109, 111–112, 114 (1979–1982)
- Who's Who in the DC Universe #13 (1991)
- Who's Who in the DC Universe Update 1993 #1-–2 (1993)
- Wonder Woman #241–242 (Wonder Woman), 272–287, 289, 296 (The Huntress back-ups) Vol 2 Annual #2 (1978–1989)
- World of Krypton #1 (1979)
- World's Finest Comics #254–270, 272–282 (1979–1982)

== Paintings ==
- "Arizona Desert with Cacti"
- "Grinding Corn"
- "New Jersey Pine Barrens"p7
