= Norm Breyfogle =

American comic artist (1960–2018)

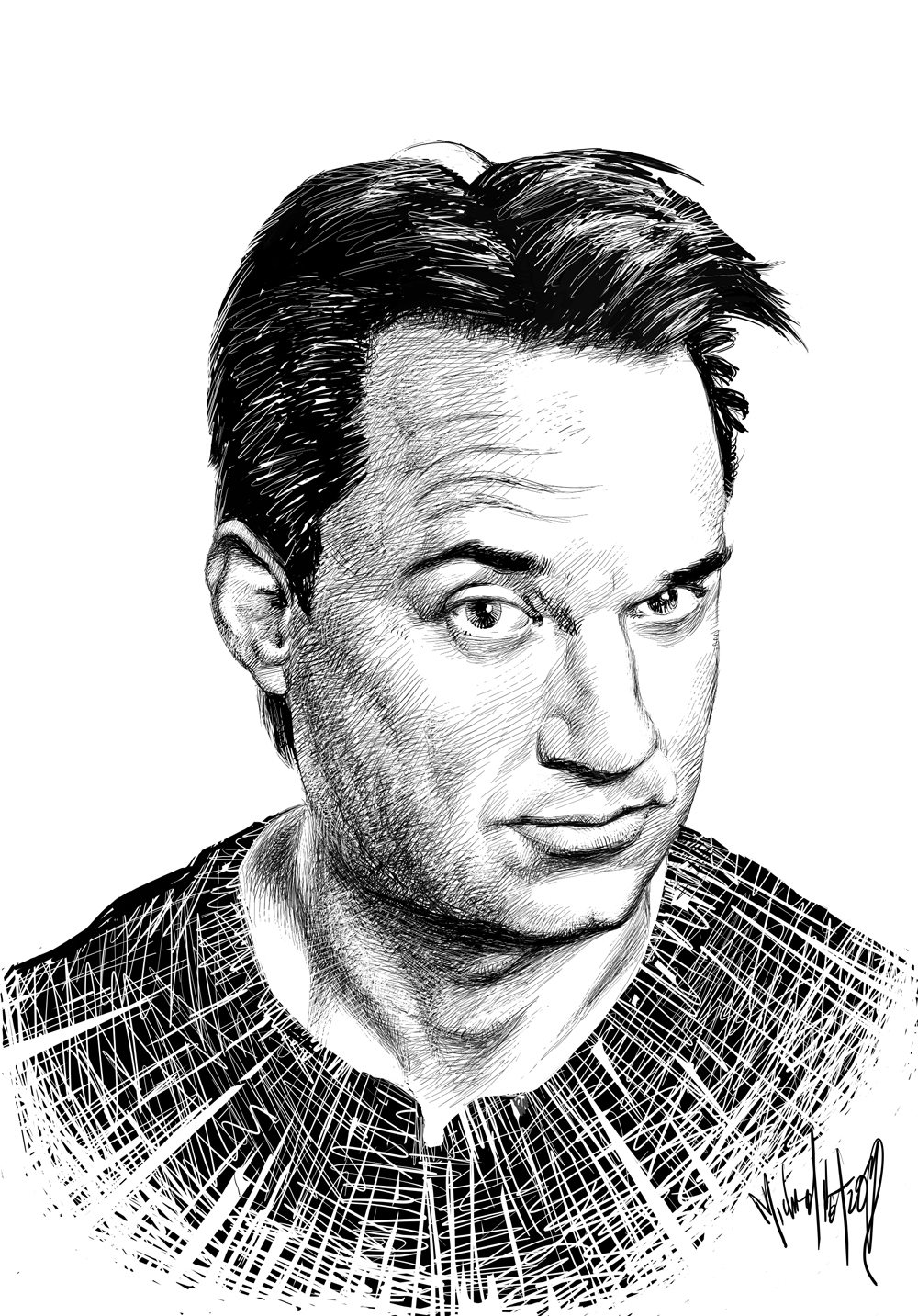
- Norm Breyfogle by Michael Netzer
- Born: Norman Keith Breyfogle; February 27, 1960 Iowa City, Iowa, U.S.
- Died: September 24, 2018 (aged 58) Houghton, Michigan, U.S.
- Areas: Writer, Penciller, Inker
- Notable works: Batman; Detective Comics; Prime

Norman Keith "Norm" Breyfogle (/ˈbreɪfoʊɡəl/; February 27, 1960 – September 24, 2018) was an American artist, best known for his comic book art on DC Comics's Batman franchise from 1987 to 1995. During this time, he co-created the villains Ventriloquist and Ratcatcher with writers Alan Grant and John Wagner, and the characters Anarky, Jeremiah Arkham, Victor Zsasz, and Amygdala with Grant alone. He co-created with writers Gerard Jones and Len Strazewski the Malibu Comics Ultraverse flagship hero Prime, and both wrote and drew the Malibu-published series featuring his original character Metaphysique.

== Early life ==
Norman Keith Breyfogle was born on February 27, 1960, in Iowa City, Iowa to parents Lois (née Roberts) and Gerald Breyfogle. He had a brother Kevin and a sister Penny Duncan.

Breyfogle began taking private art lessons at the age of twelve, and won an award at a local art show. His family subsequently moved to Houghton, Michigan, and the local newspaper The Daily Mining Gazette profiled him in 1976 as "Norm Breyfogle: Near Master Cartoonist at 16". While in high school, he produced Tech-Team, a comic commissioned by local Michigan Technological University. In 1977, he submitted a design for Robin's costume, which was published in Batman Family #13.

Breyfogle attended Northern Michigan University, studying painting and illustration while working as an illustrator for a local magazine and a graphics company. In 1980, he illustrated a book titled Bunyan: Lore's Loggin' Hero, published by Book Concern. He moved to California in 1982. He worked as a draftsman and later as a technical illustrator designing a Space Shuttle training manual for the United Space Boosters.

== Career ==
=== Early comics work ===
In 1984, Breyfogle penciled a six–page story for DC Comics's New Talent Showcase. Mike Friedrich (President of Star Reach, a talent representative agency) saw Breyfogle's work hanging at the 1985 San Diego Comic-Con Art Show and began representing him. This was followed by several issues of First Comics's American Flagg, penciling a back-up story titled "Bob Violence" in 1985. During this time he drew for Tales of Terror, a horror anthology published by Eclipse Comics. Following that, Breyfogle wrote, illustrated, and lettered a Captain America story in Marvel Fanfare #29 (Nov. 1986). He then drew Whisper for First Comics in 1986–1987, his first monthly book, before landing on Detective Comics starring Batman published by DC Comics.

=== Batman ===
Batman and Robin as drawn by Breyfogle. The cover is a modernization of Batman #9 (Feb.–March 1942), drawn by Fred Ray and Jerry Robinson.

Teamed with writer Alan Grant, Breyfogle worked on Detective Comics. They introduced the Ventriloquist in their first Batman story together and the Ratcatcher in their third. During this era, Breyfogle's output was prolific, illustrating an average of 44 pages per month.He drew the Batman for six years (1987–1993), penciling Detective Comics from 1987 to 1990, then moving to Batman to introduce the character Tim Drake as the new Robin from 1990 to 1992, and finally starting a new Batman series for DC titled Batman: Shadow of the Bat from 1992 to 1993 which saw the Grant/Breyfogle team create three new characters, Jeremiah Arkham, Victor Zsasz, and Amygdala. During his six-year run on the Batman character, he drew a few one-shots, two of them being Batman: Holy Terror, the first DC comic book to feature the Elseworlds logo, and Batman: Birth of the Demon, which he hand painted. He provided pencils to a 10-page short story in Superman 80-Page Giant #1 (Feb. 1999).

=== Later work ===
In 2000, Breyfogle drew the Elseworlds three-issue mini-series Flashpoint. In 2001, DC offered him the job of penciling The Spectre monthly, which he drew for one year.

He spent 2003 penciling and inking the title Black Tide, published by Angel Gate Press.

In 2004, Breyfogle began work on an illustrated children's book for the Society of St. John Monastery, finished many commissions for fans, put together a couple printed sketchbooks showcasing his work, and continued writing his novel, getting halfway done, finishing through chapter six. He wrote over forty poems and over 1,300 haikus in a five-month marathon, and a number of short stories.

In February 2005 he accepted an offer to pencil and ink the interiors and covers of the new ongoing monthly title Of Bitter Souls from studio Relative Comics, originally published by Speakeasy Comics. It was written by Chuck Satterlee. Shortly before Speakeasy Comics went out of business, Relative Comics joined with Chimaera Studios and moved to publisher Markosia Comics. Breyfogle produced illustrations for a wide variety of clients outside of the comics industry including Nike, Inc., Mojo, The Red Bulletin, Time Out, Company, Süddeutsche Zeitung Magazin, and various bands such as 12 Stone Toddler, among many others.

In 2007, he provided art for the main story interiors and the covers for the comic book title The Danger's Dozen. He began a professional relationship with the London-based art agency Debut Art.

Starting in 2006, he began a working relationship with Mazz Press, contributing stand-alone illustrations to two novels by Stephen Pytak, The .40 Caliber Mousehunt and The Wild Damned.

In 2008, Breyfogle began drawing Archie's New Look, for Archie's Double Digest, published by Archie Publications. Breyfogle drew two titles for Archie Comics: Archie Loves Betty and Archie Loves Veronica.

He returned to DC to draw DC Retroactive: Batman – The '90s, written by his former Batman collaborator Alan Grant, in October 2011. Breyfogle contributed art to DC's Batman Beyond Unlimited digital comic series from 2012 to 2013; later reprinted as an 18 issue series.

In 2015, DC published Legends of the Dark Knight: Norm Breyfogle Vol. 1, a hardcover collection of Breyfogle's early Batman stories. A second volume was released in late 2018.

== Retirement and death ==
On December 18, 2014, Breyfogle suffered a stroke that cut off blood flow to part of his brain, causing paralysis on his left side. He was left-handed, and although he regained some use of his left side, he was no longer able to draw professionally.

In July 2015 writer/novelist Glenn Hauman and writer/editor Bob Greenberger set up an Indiegogo campaign to raise $10,000 to defray the cost of Breyfogle's therapy, which involved producing a 280-page trade paperback reprinting issues #3–11 of Whisper, a 1986 First Comics series created by Steven Grant, which Breyfogle illustrated. The book also featured original contributions by participating creators, and was issued in hardcover to those donating at least $100.

Breyfogle died of heart failure on September 24, 2018, in Houghton, Michigan.

== Bibliography ==
=== AA2 Entertainment ===
- Agony Acres #1 (illustrations) (1996)

=== Archie Comics ===
- Archie's Double Digest Magazine #200–201, 203, 226 (2009–2012)
- Archie: The Married Life #1–2 (2011–2012)
- Archie Marries Betty #1–12 (covers only) (2011)
- Archie Marries Veronica #1–12 (covers only)
- Best of Archie Comics: Betty and Veronica Vol. 1 TPB (cover only) (2014)
- Life with Archie #1–8 (2010–2011)

=== Avatar Press ===
- Atlas #1 (2002)
- Black Tide #9 (2004)

=== Dark Horse Comics ===
- Eerie #4 (2013)
- G.I. Joe vol. 1 #2 (cover only) (1996)
- G.I. Joe vol. 2 #2 (cover only) (1996)
- Michael Chabon Presents the Amazing Adventures of the Escapist #6 (2005)

=== DC Comics ===
- Anarky #1–4 (1997)
- Anarky vol. 2 #1–8 (1999)
- Aquaman Secret Files and Origins 2003 #1 (2003)
- Aztek: The Ultimate Man #5 (cover only) (1996)
- Batman #455–466, 470–476, 492–493, 556, Annual #11–12 (1990–1998)
- Batman Beyond Unlimited #1–13, 15 (2012–2013)
- Batman: Birth of the Demon HC (1993)
- Batman: Brotherhood of the Bat #1 (1995)
- Batman: Dreamland #1 (2000)
- Batman: Holy Terror #1 (1991)
- Batman: Knight Gallery (1995)
- Batman: Legends of the Dark Knight #59–61 (covers only) (1994)
- Batman: No Man's Land Gallery (1999)
- Batman: Shadow of the Bat #1–5, 13, 50, 65–67, 75 (1992–1998)
- Batman: The Abduction #1 (1998)
- Catwoman #45 (inks over Jim Balent) (1997)
- DC Comics Presents: Green Lantern #1 (2004)
- DC One Million 80-Page Giant #1 (1999)
- DC Retroactive: Batman – The '90s #1 (2011)
- DCU Heroes Secret Files #1 (1999)
- Detective Comics #579, 582–594, 601–621, 627, 659 (1987–1993)
- Detention Comics #1 (1996)
- The Flash 80-Page Giant #2 (1999)
- Flashpoint #1–3 (1999–2000)
- Green Lantern: Circle of Fire #1 (2000)
- Hawkman vol. 3 #33 (cover only) (1996)
- Human Defense Corps #6 (2003)
- Jack Kirby's Fourth World Gallery (1996)
- JLA: Incarnations #5 (2001)
- JLA Secret Files and Origins (2000)
- JLA-Z #3 (2004)
- Legion of Super-Heroes vol. 3 #24 (1986)
- Lobo #51 (1998)
- Lobo's Greatest Hits (1992)
- Robin II #3 (variant cover only) (1992)
- New Talent Showcase #11, 13 (1984–1985)
- Silver Age: Flash #1 (2000)
- Silver Age Secret Files #1 (2000)
- Sins of Youth Secret Files #1 (2000)
- Spectre vol. 4 #15–23, 25–27 (2002–2003)
- Suicide Squad #49 (cover only) (1991)
- Super Heros Stamp Album Celebrate the Century #1–3, 8–9 (1998–2000)
- Superman vol. 2 #130, #1,000,000 (1997–1998)
- Superman 80-Page Giant #1 (1999)
- Superman Forever #1 (1998)
- Supermen of America #1 (1999)
- Talent Showcase #18 (inks over Jack Arata) (1985)
- Trinity of Sin: The Phantom Stranger #18–20 (inks over Fernando Blanco) (2014)
- Who's Who in the DC Universe #2–3, 5, 7–8, 10, 13, 16 (1990–1992)
- Who's Who: The Definitive Directory of the DC Universe #24 (1987)
- Who's Who Update '88 #3–4 (1988)
- Wonder Woman Annual #5 (inks over Dave Cockrum) (1996)

=== Eclipse Comics ===
- Born to Be Wild (1991)
- Metaphysique #1–2 (1992)
- Miracleman: Apocrypha #1 (1991)
- Tales of Terror #6 (inks over Nicholas Koenig), 8 (inks over Bob Orzechowski) (1986)

=== First Comics ===
- American Flagg! #33, 35–38 (1986–1987)
- Whisper #3–11 (1986–1988)

=== First Salvo Productions ===
- The Danger's Dozen #1–3 (2008)
- The Danger Dozen: Interlude #1 (2008)

=== Image Comics ===
- ShadowHawk Gallery (1994)

=== Innovation ===
- The Maze Agency #17 (cover only) (1990)

=== Last Gasp ===
- Strip AIDS U.S.A. (1988)

=== Malibu Comics ===
- Firearm #5 (inks over Jon Bogdanove) (1994)
- Flood Relief #1 (cover only) (1994)
- Hardcase #1 (inks over Jim Callahan) (1993)
- Mantra #7, 10 (covers only) (1994)
- Metaphysique vol. 2 #1–6 (1995)
- Prime #1/2, 1–12 (1993–1994)
- Prime: Gross and Disgusting #1 (1994)
- Ultraverse Premiere #0 (1993)

=== Marvel Comics ===
- The Avengers Annual 2000 #1 (2000)
- Black Panther, vol. 3, #30 (2001)
- Hellcat #1–3 (2000)
- Marc Spector: Moon Knight, vol. 3, #42 (1992)
- Marvel Fanfare #29 (Captain America); #31 (Daredevil); #37 (Fantastic Four); #45 (Pin-up); #57 (Pin-up) (1986–1991)
- Open Space #3 (1990)
- Prime vol, 2 #9–10 (1996)
- Prime/Captain America #1 (1996)
- Thunderbolts 2000 #1 (2000)
- Within Our Reach #1 (1992)

=== Massive Comics Group ===
- Tales from the Aniverse #2 (illustrations) (1991)

=== New Comics Group ===
- Deadtime Stories #1 (1987)

=== Now Comics ===
- The Green Hornet #14 (cover only) (1990)
- Mr. T and the T-Force #3–4 (full art); 5, 7 (covers only) (1993–1994)
- Racer X #10 (cover only) (1989)
- Tales of the Green Hornet #1 (cover only) (1992)
- The Terminator #7–8 (covers only) (1989)

=== Speakeasy Comics ===
- Of Bitter Souls #1–3 (2005)

=== Valiant Comics ===
- Bloodshot #30–31, 34–35 (1995)
- The Outcast #1 (1995)

Preceded by Todd McFarlane	Detective Comics artist 1987–1990	Succeeded by Flint Henry and Mike McKone
Preceded by Kieron Dwyer	Batman artist 1990–1992	Succeeded by Cam Kennedy
Preceded by n/a	Batman: Shadow of the Bat artist 1992	Succeeded by Dan Jurgens
Preceded by n/a	Prime artist 1993–1994	Succeeded by Darick Robertson
Preceded by Craig Hamilton	The Spectre vol. 4 artist 2002–2003	Succeeded by n/a
