= Josef Rubinstein =

American comic book artist

- Rubinstein at Dragon Con in 2026
- Born: June 4, 1958 (age 68) Poland
- Area: Inker
- Notable works: The Official Handbook of the Marvel Universe

Josef "Joe" Rubinstein (born 4 June 1958) is a comic book artist and inker, most associated with inking Marvel Comics' The Official Handbook of the Marvel Universe and the 1982 four-issue Wolverine miniseries by Chris Claremont and Frank Miller. He is also known for giving artist Art Adams his first professional work.

== Early life ==
Josef Rubinstein was born in Wrocław, Poland in 1958. He moved with his family to the United States, where he became a naturalized citizen in 1972.

== Career ==
Rubinstein started his artist career in the early 1970s as a teenager. Primarily working as an inker, his artwork has been published by major U.S. comics publishers including Marvel Comics, DC Comics and Dark Horse Comics. However, he first entered the industry as an office assistant to Neal Adams and Dick Giordano at Continuity Associates. While working this position, he learned how to ink from Giordano.

At age 17, he met Mike Nasser, who had just received his first comics assignment, penciling a backup feature in Kamandi #45-46. Nasser allowed Rubinstein to practice inking on photocopies of his pencils for the story, and afterward showed the results to editor Gerry Conway, who then assigned Rubinstein to inking the story. Rubinstein is grateful that editors assigned him work with Nasser as partners, pairing them with each other on every assignment.

In 1982, Rubinstein inked the acclaimed Wolverine limited series.

One of his most important works has been inking The Official Handbook of the Marvel Universe over a span of twenty years, for which he holds a comic book record of inking more pencilers than any other inker. Rubinstein recounted,

I did an inker's round table for a magazine called Comics Scene, where Klaus Janson, Tom Palmer, Bob Layton and myself all inked a Mike Zeck drawing. Mark Gruenwald saw these and decided that mine was the clearest to understand what the character looked like, not necessarily the best inked, and when I came back from the San Diego con ... Mark said, "We're doing this encyclopedia, and we would like you to ink as many of the figures as you want." And I said, "I'll ink all of them," which turned into a gold mine and a godsend. [laughs] And he picked me because he knew that I would not make a homogenous look of it, and I honestly think I chameleon my style enough ...

Among his extensive inking credits (which include more than 2,500 comic books), were work with Michael Golden on Micronauts, Jim Starlin's Warlock, and Aquaman with Don Newton. Later assignments included a mini-series for Dark Horse Comics called Archenemies and co-inking issues of DC Comics's Ion mini-series and Green Arrow/Black Canary. In 2016 he was inducted into the Joe Sinnott Inkwell Hall of Fame.

== Awards ==
In 2016, Rubinstein won one of the two annual Inkwell Awards Joe Sinnott Hall of Fame Awards. In his acceptance speech, he once again named Dick Giordano as his mentor.
