= Frank R. Wallace =

American writer

- Born: Wallace Ward; 1932
- Died: January 26, 2006 (aged 73–74); Henderson, Nevada
- Education: University of Iowa (doctorate)
- Organization: Integrated Management Associates
- Known for: Social and political writer, philosopher, mail-order entrepreneur
- Movement: Neo-Tech

Frank R. Wallace (1932 – January 26, 2006), born Wallace Ward, was an American writer, publisher and mail-order magnate. Previously a professional poker player, he is originator of the philosophy of Neo-Tech (also referred to as "Neotech" or "Neothink") an offshoot of Ayn Rand's Objectivism. He was convicted of various federal tax crimes in the 1990s. During his trials, he challenged the oath he was required to take before testifying which became the case United States v. Ward in which the Appeals Court upheld his right to recite an alternate oath.

== Education and career ==
Wallace Ward graduated from Colby College in 1954. In 1957 he earned his doctorate in Inorganic and Analytical Chemistry from the State University of Iowa. He then worked for nine years as a research chemist for DuPont. He then turned to philosophy and started I & O Publishing in 1968 and served as president, publisher, and editor, writing books and articles under various pen names. One of his books was about how to win at poker.

== Publishing company ==
Wallace owned the Integrated Management Associates publishing company, a spin-off of I & O that publishes books and articles by various writers (including himself) concerning Neo-Tech.

Australian Fair Trading Minister Margaret Keech criticized Neo-Tech as a group of "con-artists", for claiming to select "a small handful of 'special' individuals" to receive "secret wisdom of ages", and then asking the individuals to pay money to obtain these "secrets". The company was the subject of a 2000 ruling by the Advertising Standards Authority of the UK, in which the Authority claimed Neo-Tech had "not provided evidence, other than anecdotal, to show the guaranteed earnings, improvements to health, and other benefits ... had been, or could be, attained".

== Neo-Tech philosophy ==
Wallace's Neo-Tech philosophy is presented as an offshoot of Objectivist philosophy. In his books, as is the case in Objectivism, Wallace opposed anything considered to be mysticism or supernaturalism, including all forms of religion. Wallace saw scientific research to make ageless biological immortality a reality as an important mission. Another significant influence was the theory of bicameralism of the mind advanced by Julian Jaynes, which Wallace used to explain the persistence of irrationality and mysticism into the present. Additionally, in his book Zonpower, which has been characterized by critics as being inspired by Scientology, Wallace talk about how the human race could join a "Civilization of the Universe" once it "exorcise" the last of its mystical tendencies. Neo-Tech has been described as a scam, a cult, and as not being a genuine philosophical system by critics.

Comic book author Alan Grant wrote a four-part Anarky miniseries in 1997, and an eight-part ongoing series in 1999, for DC Comics based on Wallace's Neo-Tech philosophy. Grant said, "I felt he [Anarky] was the perfect character [to express the Neo-Tech philosophy] because he's human, he has no special powers, the only power he's got is the power of his own rational consciousness." Illustrator and Anarky co-creator Norm Breyfogle viewed Neo-Tech as a "modernized" interpretation of Objectivism.

== Tax evasion and the "fully integrated Honesty" oath ==
On March 29, 1990, Wallace was indicted on three counts of tax evasion and three counts of willful failure to timely file Federal income tax returns or pay taxes. At his trial, Wallace proposed an alternative oath written by him, to be used before testifying, using the phrase "fully integrated Honesty." The court denied his request, insisting on a "standard oath." The court would not allow Wallace to testify in his defense unless he took the standard oath.

Wallace made an opening statement at the trial in February 1991, and cross-examined government witnesses. He also wanted to testify in his own defense, and offered to take both his own oath and the oath prescribed by the U.S. District Court. The District Court refused to allow him to testify unless he used only the oath prescribed by the Court, which he declined to do. He was convicted on all charges. He appealed, in part on the ground that the District Court had violated his freedom of religion, and the United States Court of Appeals for the Ninth Circuit reversed his conviction. The Court of Appeals held that by refusing to allow him to testify unless he used only the oath prescribed by the District Court, the District Court had violated Ward's First Amendment right to freedom of religion.

Wallace used his own wording for the oath in a re-trial. In the re-trial in 1993, a jury found him guilty of tax evasion for years 1983, 1984 and 1985.

== Death ==
On January 26, 2006 while Wallace was jogging in Henderson, Nevada, he was struck and killed by a motorist. He was 73 years old.

== Works ==
- Poker - A Guaranteed Income For Life by using the Advanced Concepts of Poker (1968)

== See also ==
- List of Colby College people
- List of University of Iowa people
