= Batman: Contagion =

Batman storyline

"Contagion"
- Cover of Batman: Contagion (1996), trade paperback collected edition, art by Rodolfo Damaggio
- Publisher: DC Comics
- Publication date: March – April 1996
- Genre: Superhero; Crossover
Title(s)
- Azrael #15-16
- Batman #529-532
- The Batman Chronicles #4
- Batman: Shadow of the Bat #48-49
- Catwoman (vol. 2) #31-32
- Detective Comics #695-696
- Robin (vol. 2) #27-28
- Main character(s): Batman; Robin; Catwoman; Azrael
- Batman: Contagion: ISBN 1-56389-293-6

Contagion is a story arc that ran through the various Batman comic book series. It concerns the outbreak of a lethal disease in Gotham City, and Batman's attempts to combat it. The incident of this story led into Batman: Legacy and Batman: Cataclysm, which itself leads into Batman: No Man's Land. It ran from March through April 1996.

Much of the plot centers around a gated community in the middle of Gotham City, whose wealthy residents believe they can protect themselves from the plague by sealing themselves inside, only to discover that one of their number is the plague's first carrier. In this the story parallels the plot of Edgar Allan Poe's short story The Masque of the Red Death, which one of the community's dying residents mentions.

== Plot ==
Batman: Shadow of the Bat #48

Azrael sends a report to Batman that a plague connected to the Order of St. Dumas is on its way to Gotham City. Robin (Tim Drake) finds that a private plane has just landed in Gotham from Africa. The passenger, Peter Maris, enters his exclusive condominium complex, Babylon Towers. Believing that the plague is about to infect Gotham, he proposes to the other homeowners that they dismiss their servants and seal the building, which is entirely self-sufficient, and they agree. What Maris does not know is that he is already infected, and has passed the infection to his pilot, who joins the servants entering the city. Batman infiltrates a military facility where the Ebola Gulf-A virus, also known as "the Clench", was being studied. The military's head of research, General Derwent, has been accidentally infected and is slowly dying.

Detective Comics #695 / Robin #27 / Catwoman #31

Batman and Robin trace the original source of the outbreak to Babylon Towers, eavesdropping while Peter Maris, now realizing that he is infected, tells the other residents about a survivor from a previous outbreak in Greenland. The residents post an enormous reward for his live capture. As a result, when Robin and Alfred Pennyworth arrive in Canada to find him, Catwoman and a bounty hunter named Tracker are already there. The two pairs' initial clash is halted by Azrael, whom Batman asked to keep an eye on Robin. While they are trying to get the survivor to safety, they are ambushed by gunmen. The survivor dies, but gives Robin a sample of his blood, along with the names of two other possible survivors.

Azrael #15

Azrael joins forces with Tracker and Catwoman, while Robin returns to Gotham City with the blood. They track the second survivor, a Chinese gangster, to a yacht and overpower his guards. The gangster has come to regard his survival of the plague as proof that he is immortal, and demonstrates his immortality by stabbing himself in the throat with a knife, lingering just long enough to realize that he was wrong.

Batman #529

Gotham City has been quarantined. Robin and Azrael deliver blood samples from the two survivors to Batman, who attempts to create an antidote. Believing he has succeeded, Batman has Poison Ivy released from Arkham Asylum to deliver the cure to Babylon Towers, since she is immune to all toxins and diseases. Nightwing and Huntress join forces to try and quell riots outside Babylon Towers, while the Gotham Police Department, completely disgusted with the ineffective leadership of Mayor Krol and his toady, Commissioner Andy Howe, ask James Gordon to resume his old post.

Batman: Shadow of the Bat #49

Inside Babylon Towers, Poison Ivy amuses herself by soliciting bids for the antidote from the richest and most desperate residents. Batman and Gordon both enter the complex to re-capture her and quell the unrest inside, learning that the antidote does not work. Outside, Robin's contact with one of the rioters leads to him being infected.

Detective Comics #696

Nightwing rushes Robin to the Batcave and puts him under Alfred's care. The state governor, fed up with Krol's inaction, declares martial law and sends in the National Guard. Batman re-captures Ivy and escapes Babylon Towers with her and Gordon, before the mob burns it to the ground.

The Batman Chronicles #4

Batman learns of a secret government entity that might be able to provide a cure for the plague, but Hitman kills its agent first. Huntress tries to find one of her students who lost his entire family to the plague, and finds him already dying of it. Delirious from fever, Tim Drake dreams of a life in which his mother is still alive, and his parents and girlfriend know about him being Robin.

Catwoman #32

Catwoman picks up the trail of the third and last survivor from the Greenland outbreak, finding her in Florida and taking her back to Gotham City. She is disappointed to find Babylon Towers has burned to the ground, meaning that there is no one left alive to pay the bounty – and even more disappointed when Batman informs her that a cure cannot be synthesized from any of the survivors' blood.

Azrael #16

Seeing the plague virus through the microscope, Azrael realizes that he has seen it before, meaning it was engineered and unleashed by the Order of St. Dumas. Searching through the texts Brian took from the Order, Lilhy is able to translate the formula for the antidote. Azrael rushes it to Gotham City, evading assassins sent by the Order to stop him, and delivers the formula to a hospital.

Robin #28

Nightwing returns to the Batcave and finds Tim cured. Batman reminds them that they still have to restore order in the city, even after Marion Grange replaces Armand Krol and reinstates Gordon as Police Commissioner. Despite almost dying from the plague, Robin joins Batman and Nightwing in aiding the police against a local gang, trying to hold an infected family for ransom by blocking off the medical authorities. This display of resolve pierces Catwoman's normal cynicism, and she lends a hand as well, after which Tim returns home.

== Collected editions ==
A trade paperback collecting all the issues involved in the crossover was published in 1996, and reprinted in the 2000s. These later printings featured different cover art. In 2016, Batman: Contagion was collected again in a new edition that added Batman #530-532, Batman: Shadow of the Bat #50-52, Robin #29-30, and new cover artwork.
