= Black Mask (character) =

Comic book supervillain

- Cover of Batman #636 (January 2005). Art by Matt Wagner.

Publication information
- Publisher: DC Comics
- First appearance: Batman #386 (August 1985)
- Created by: Doug Moench (writer); Tom Mandrake (artist)

In-story information
- Alter ego: Roman Sionis
- Team affiliations: False Face Society; Gotham Mafia; Secret Society of Super Villains; Black Lantern Corps; Suicide Squad
- Notable aliases: The Crime King, Orpheus, Black Head, Underworld Boss, Ted Kord
- Abilities: Criminal mastermind; Skilled marksman, hand-to-hand combatant, and torturer; Mind control via mask

Black Mask is a supervillain appearing in American comic books published by DC Comics. Created by writer Doug Moench and artist Tom Mandrake, the character first appeared in Batman #386 (1985) and has become one of the superhero Batman's most enduring enemies, belonging to the collective of adversaries that make up his rogues gallery.

Black Mask is the alter ego of Roman Sionis, a ruthless businessman and one of Gotham City's most powerful crime lords with a fixation on masks and torture. Abused and neglected by his wealthy but narcissistic parents as a child, he developed a deep-seated hatred for the "masks" they wore in public and the artificiality of Gotham's social elite. After murdering his parents and carving a black ebony mask from his father's coffin, he formed an organization called the False Face Society and became a brutal and sadistic crime boss vying to take control of Gotham's criminal underworld, bringing him into conflict with Batman. Black Mask also harbors a personal grudge against Batman's alter ego of Bruce Wayne, due to the Wayne family's association to his parents, and his mask was burned onto his face during a battle with Batman, causing him to permanently resemble his namesake. Aside from Batman, Black Mask has also fought Catwoman and the Red Hood.

Black Mask has been adapted in various media incarnations, having been portrayed by Ewan McGregor in the DC Extended Universe film Birds of Prey and Peter Outerbridge in the Arrowverse television series Batwoman. James Remar, Wade Williams and Brian Bloom, among others, have provided the character's voice in animation and video games.

== Fictional character biography ==
=== Origin story ===
Black Mask as depicted in Batman Villains Secret Files & Origins #1 (October 1998). Art by Tom Mandrake.

Black Mask's origin story was established in his first appearance. Roman Sionis was born to wealthy and self-absorbed parents, who cared more about their social status than their own son. Moments after Roman's birth, the doctor carelessly dropped him on his head, and his parents covered up the entire incident so that their high society friends would not find out. Years later, he was attacked by a rabid raccoon at the Sionis family country estate, and his parents forbade him to mention the incident to anyone. Despite their dislike for fellow socialites Thomas and Martha Wayne, Roman's parents continued to associate with them to maintain their social standing, and forced Roman to befriend their son, Bruce. His parents' hypocrisy had a deep impact on Roman, and he grew to resent them and the "masks" that they wore in public.

After graduating from high school, Roman was given a high-ranking position in his father's company, Janus Cosmetics. There, he met and fell in love with working-class model Circe, though his parents did not approve of the relationship and forced him to break it off. Enraged, Roman burned down his family mansion, killing both of his parents and inheriting their fortune and business. Roman lacked his father's business acumen and eventually ruined Janus Cosmetics by funding a failed line of face-paint make-up. Desperate, Roman had the staff chemists create a product that was rushed to the market without proper testing, disfiguring several hundred women. Circe, now Roman's fiancée, then broke up with him in front of his entire staff.

Bruce Wayne, now the head of Wayne Enterprises, offered to bail Janus Cosmetics out on the condition that Roman gave up control and allowed Wayne to appoint his own board of directors. Humiliated and furious, Roman broke into the cemetery where his parents were buried. Before he could unlock the Sionis crypt, a lightning bolt struck him, blasting the door open and hurling Roman head-first into a nearby stone. Roman took the incident as an omen of his "rebirth" and entered the crypt, smashing his father's casket and using its fragments to carve an ebony mask, starting a new life as the crime lord Black Mask.

=== Criminal career ===
Within a month, Black Mask had assembled a group of dozens of criminals, leading to the creation of the Sionis Crime Family, better known as the False Face Society, using the Sionis crypt as their base of operations. Each member of the False Face Society wore a distinctive mask, and the gang's crime spree spread rapidly throughout Gotham, eventually attracting the attentions of the police and Bruce Wayne, now operating as the vigilante Batman. To settle old scores, Black Mask murdered three Wayne Foundation executives and kidnapped Circe, forcing her to don a mask laced with Janus Cosmetics' toxic makeup, sparing her life but permanently disfiguring her face. Black Mask then threatened Circe into rejoining him, giving her a "mannequin" mask intentionally designed to mock her former life.

Batman eventually managed to deduce Black Mask's identity and correctly predicted that Bruce Wayne would be Sionis' next target. To set a trap for Black Mask, Bruce held a masquerade ball at Wayne Manor, and Sionis infiltrated the ball and lured Bruce to the mansion's conservatory to kill him. Bruce disarmed Sionis, forcing the latter to retreat to his hideout with Robin (Jason Todd) secretly following him. While Batman and Robin fought his underlings at the graveyard, Black Mask escaped through a false bottom installed in his father's coffin and headed to his family estate. Black Mask then entered his old bedroom and set fire to the old toys inside, intending to burn the mansion to the ground to symbolically kill his old identity as Sionis. Before Black Mask could escape, Batman flung a Batarang-attached cable around the crime lord's knees, causing him to fall face-first on the burning floor just as the bedroom's rafters began to collapse. The rafters pinned Black Mask's face into the pile of burning toys, and although Batman and Robin were able to tow him out of the fire, Sionis' mask had been burned onto his face. Black Mask was subsequently sent to Arkham Asylum, where he remained behind bars until Ra's al Ghul freed all of its inmates. Black Mask was not amongst the criminals who followed the Joker in searching for the one behind the breakout and thus never took part in the "war" against Batman's allies and loved ones. As this tale was the last "canonical" one to take place on Earth-One, it can be assumed that Black Mask remained at large.

Following Crisis on Infinite Earths, Jeremiah Arkham frees all of Arkham Asylum's inmates, including Black Mask, to attack Batman during the events of "The Last Arkham". Sionis then returns to crime after an unspecified breakout, evidently retaining most of his Pre-Crisis history. He soon begins the False Face Society anew, rising through the ranks of Gotham City's underworld while furthering his vendetta against Bruce Wayne. To stop the False Face Society, Batman poses as a new recruit to their ranks, christened "Skullface" by Black Mask himself. Black Mask later kidnaps Lucius Fox, who had a hand in Bruce Wayne's bailout of Janus Cosmetics. Although Batman is eventually able to save Fox, Black Mask manages to evade capture. Black Mask remains at large throughout the events of "Knightfall" and "Zero Hour", and resurfaces shortly thereafter to kill rival mobster "Dirty Dan" Doyle in an ambush shootout.

Black Mask is later approached by the Black Spider, who wishes to join the False Face Society. Black Mask demands the young man to "make his bones" first by crashing a masquerade ball being held at Wayne Manor. Batman later learns that the Black Spider is a double agent working for mobster "Turk" Ottoman, and tracks him down to an abandoned theater where he prevents him from shooting Black Mask, who subsequently escapes during the chaos. Black Mask reappears as a crime lord in "The Cult" storyline, having given up his vendetta against Bruce Wayne. He controls a large portion of Gotham's criminal underworld until the city is destroyed by an earthquake in the "No Man's Land" story arc.

Black Mask later becomes the leader of a cult, whose trademark is ritual scarring, foregoing his mask and disfiguring his face to resemble a blackened human skull until Batman and Huntress dissolve it by defeating and imprisoning Black Mask in Blackgate Penitentiary, though the crime lord escapes before the city is made a part of the country again.

In Catwoman vol. 3 #16, Black Mask begins a drug trafficking ring and decides to move his organization into Gotham's East End. Catwoman soon begins interfering with Black Mask's plans, stealing money from him and giving it to the poor. Black Mask retaliates by forcing Sylvia Sinclair to reveal Catwoman's secret identity to him. After destroying Catwoman's youth center, Black Mask kidnaps her sister and brother-in-law, the latter of whom he tortures to death with power tools, before forcing the former to eat pieces of her husband's corpse, including his eyeballs. Catwoman arrives to find her brother-in-law dead, her sister insane, and her friend Holly Robinson on the verge of being tortured. Enraged, Catwoman engages Black Mask at his penthouse, where the crime lord falls from the top of the building.

In War Games, Spoiler seeks out hoping to get Batman control of all of Gotham's crime lords. However, Black Mask murders Orpheus by slitting his throat and proceeds to torture Spoiler to obtain information about the rest of her plan. Black Mask assumes Orpheus' identity using face putty and padding, fooling even Batman and Onyx. As Orpheus, he goes on a mission to kill any member or associate of the Batman Family. As Black Mask returns to continue torturing the Spoiler for entertainment, he finds that she has escaped and subsequently tracks her down. Although she escapes his clutches once again, the Spoiler supposedly dies due to the injuries inflicted on her and the willful negligence of Leslie Thompkins.

Black Mask later infiltrates Oracle's Clocktower in an attempt to expose her to the mob, and Batman attacks him in a blind rage. Fearful that Black Mask will kill Batman, Oracle activates a self-destruct device in the tower to get Batman to save her. In the storyline Batman: Under the Hood, Black Mask then becomes the overlord of Gotham's underworld, gathering enough financial resources to purchase an Amazo android and a large supply of kryptonite. Allied with reporter Arturo Rodriguez and later Mr. Freeze, Black Mask begins a campaign to discredit Batman; while Rodriguez slams Batman in the press, Black Mask commits a series of murders disguised as the Dark Knight. The real Batman eventually exposes Rodriguez and captures Black Mask, but the crime lord kills the escorting officer transporting him to jail and escapes again.

Later, a series of attacks by the Red Hood (revealed later as being a resurrected Jason Todd) causes Black Mask to lose power and money to this new rival. The assassin Deathstroke later approaches Black Mask, offering him a place in the Society. Eager to strengthen his increasingly tenuous grip on the underworld, the crime lord accepts. However, the Red Hood eludes the Society's members and dismantles Black Mask's control over organized crime. Black Mask then continues to threaten the most important people in Catwoman's life, prompting her to kill him with her gun. After the shooting, Selina Kyle passes the mantle of Catwoman to her friend Holly, who is arrested for Sionis' murder. In Gotham Underground, dozens of would-be crime bosses attempt to fill the vacancy created by Black Mask's death.

In Blackest Night, Black Mask is resurrected as a Black Lantern and attacks Catwoman. Poison Ivy stops Black Mask by trapping him in a mutated pitcher plant that dissolves his body as fast as he can regenerate.

=== The New 52 ===
In 2011, The New 52 rebooted the DC universe. Roman Sionis is re-established as Black Mask, and his history with the False Face Society remains intact. This version of the character has dissociative identity disorder, with Roman Sionis being one personality and Black Mask being the other, and the technology in his mask grants him the ability to control "the weak minded". Roman Sionis is first seen in Arkham Asylum's infirmary being treated by Dr. Jeremiah Arkham during the Night of the Owls; Sionis attempted a hunger strike to try to regain his mask. When the Talons attack the Asylum, Arkham gives Sionis his mask back to telepathically influence the inmates into attacking the Talons and keep anyone from following Arkham to his safe room. Black Mask then attempts to use his abilities on Batman, but fails and is forced to escape the asylum. Black Mask later resurfaces to re-assemble the False Face Society, coming into conflict with the Mad Hatter while doing so (who considers Black Mask an enemy due to their similar mind control abilities). Batman intervenes and puts an end to their battle and Sionis is sent back to Arkham Asylum. During the Forever Evil storyline, Black Mask appears as a member of the Secret Society of Super Villains when the Crime Syndicate arrive from their Earth. Black Mask and his False Face Society crash the Rogues' battle against Mr. Freeze and Clayface to claim the bounty on the Rogues.

=== DC Rebirth ===
In 2016, DC Comics implemented a relaunch of its books called "DC Rebirth", which restored its continuity to a form much as it was prior to "The New 52". Roman Sionis remains one of Gotham's most powerful crime lords. This version of the character dons a black metallic mask and is allied with the Penguin and Great White Shark in an alliance known as "the Blacks and Whites". Together, they hire KGBeast to kill Batman.

In Doomsday Clock, Black Mask is among the villains who meet with the Riddler to discuss the Superman Theory.

In Teen Titans Rebirth, Damian Wayne imprisons Black Mask in a secret prison after learning about his involvement in the destruction of the Arab restaurant Tarbooshes.

== Powers and abilities ==
Black Mask is a criminal mastermind and tactical analyst with vast wealth and resources at his disposal, making him one of the most powerful crime bosses in Gotham's criminal underbelly. He utilizes his various connections to eliminate opposition and consolidates power using fear and intimidation; he is renowned for his brutally sadistic physical and psychological torture techniques, which he uses either to extract information or simply to torment his enemies for entertainment. Black Mask is an expert marksman with firearms, particularly with his signature twin automatic pistols, although he is proficient with melee weapons such as swords as well. He is a skilled hand-to-hand combatant and has displayed impressive levels of stamina and endurance; his high tolerance for pain has allowed him to hold his own against accomplished fighters such as Batman and Catwoman. Black Mask is also an accomplished businessman, impersonator, actor, and escape artist.

Per the events of The New 52, Roman Sionis' mask possesses hypnotic abilities that extend through the material of the masks that his henchmen wear, rendering them directly under his control. Black Mask has also killed his victims by applying toxin-filled masks to their faces, poisoning them and leaving their faces hideously shriveled and blackened. His mask also allows him to assume the form of other people, from Ted Kord to Superman, though without assuming their powers.

== Other characters named Black Mask ==
=== Jeremiah Arkham ===
In Battle for the Cowl, a second criminal using the Black Mask alias emerges. He is eventually revealed to be Jeremiah Arkham, who took up Roman Sionis' mantle after suffering a psychotic breakdown from exposure to a variety of mind-altering chemicals from various Batman villains.

=== Richard Sionis ===
In the 2016 relaunch DC Rebirth, the character Richard Sionis / The Mask from the television series Gotham was integrated into the comics as Roman Sionis' father and the founder of the False Face Society. Roman kills him to gain control of the Society and leaves his father's mask on his corpse.

== Other versions ==
- An alternate universe version of Black Mask appears in Batman: Crimson Mist as one of several villains killed by a vampiric Batman.
- An alternate universe version of Black Mask appears in Absolute Batman. This version is the leader of a terrorist group called the Party Animals.

== In other media ==
=== Television ===
- Black Mask appears in The Batman, voiced by James Remar. This version is an unidentifiable criminal mastermind as his mask cannot be removed and he has no fingerprints or distinguishing features.
- Black Mask appears in Batman: The Brave and the Bold, voiced by John DiMaggio.
- A character named Richard Sionis appears in Gotham, portrayed by Todd Stashwick. This version is the head of Sionis Investments who secretly hosts a fight club between his employees that is televised for Gotham City's social elite. He is arrested by Jim Gordon and later killed by Theo and Tabitha Galavan. Richard Sionis was later integrated into the comics as Roman Sionis' father during the 2016 relaunch DC Rebirth.
- Roman Sionis / Black Mask appears in the second season of Batwoman, portrayed by Peter Outerbridge. This version is the CEO of Janus Cosmetics who runs a "Snakebite" drug ring and blames the Crows security firm and Kate Kane / Batwoman for the death of his daughter Circe Sionis during a mass breakout at Arkham Asylum caused by Alice.

=== Film ===
Ewan McGregor as Roman Sionis / Black Mask in Birds of Prey

- Black Mask appears in Batman: Under the Red Hood, voiced by Wade Williams. This version is the first crime lord to take complete control of Gotham City in twenty years until his operation comes under attack by the vigilante Red Hood.
- Black Mask appears in Batman: Bad Blood, voiced by Steve Blum.
- Roman Beauvais Sionis / Black Mask appears in Birds of Prey, portrayed by Ewan McGregor. This version is a narcissistic crime lord who masquerades as the charismatic owner of the "Black Mask Club", a popular nightclub in Gotham's criminal underworld. He has his right-hand man Victor Zsasz kill the Bertinelli crime family and pursue a diamond embedded with the account numbers to their fortune.
- Black Mask makes a non-speaking cameo appearance in Batman: Death in the Family. He is killed by Jason Todd in varying manners depending on the viewer's choices.
- Black Mask appears in Catwoman: Hunted, voiced by Jonathan Banks. This version is a member of Leviathan.

=== Video games ===
- Black Mask appears as a boss in Batman: Dark Tomorrow, voiced by Tom McKeon.
- Black Mask appears as a unlockable playable character in the Nintendo DS version of Lego Batman: The Videogame.
- Black Mask appears in the Nintendo 3DS version of Lego Batman 2: DC Super Heroes.
- Black Mask appears as a character summon in Scribblenauts Unmasked: A DC Comics Adventure.
- Black Mask appears in Lego Batman: Legacy of the Dark Knight.

==== Batman: Arkham ====
Black Mask in a promotional image for Batman: Arkham Origins

Roman Sionis / Black Mask appears in the Batman: Arkham video game franchise, voiced by Nolan North in Arkham City and by Brian Bloom in subsequent appearances.

- Black Mask first appears in Batman: Arkham City.
- Black Mask appears in the prequel Batman: Arkham Origins. The Joker captures and poses as Black Mask to hire eight assassins to kill Batman. After being freed by Batman, Black Mask attempts to rebuild his criminal empire by stashing several drug canisters throughout Gotham City, but Batman finds and destroys them before defeating Sionis and his henchmen. Black Mask also appears in a challenge map DLC pack.
  - Black Mask appears in the companion game Batman: Arkham Origins Blackgate, wherein he takes control of Blackgate Penitentiary's Industrial Building. A shootout with prison guards hits a gas main that triggers an explosion and burns Black Mask's mask onto his face.
- Black Mask appears in the Batman: Arkham Knight "Red Hood" DLC, in which Jason Todd tracks him down and throws him out of a window to his apparent death.
- Black Mask makes a cameo appearance in Batman: Arkham Shadow as an inmate placed in solitary confinement at Blackgate Penitentiary.

=== Miscellaneous ===
- Roman Sionis appears in The Batman Adventures vol. 2 #5. This version is a formerly legitimate businessman who turned his company into a corporate juggernaut until Wayne Enterprises cost him his industry. He is later approached by an associate of the Red Hood, who convinces him to become Black Mask and lead the False Face Society, though he is ultimately apprehended by Batman.
- The Batman incarnation of Black Mask appears in The Batman Strikes! tie-in comic.
- The Batman: Arkham incarnation of Black Mask appears in Batman: Arkham Unhinged.
- Black Mask makes minor appearances in the Injustice: Gods Among Us prequel comic.
- Professional wrestler Andrade El Idolo wears attire based on Black Mask as his entrance gear for All Elite Wrestling, which he debuted in AEW Road Rager.
- Black Mask appears in the Harley Quinn tie-in comic, Harley Quinn: The Animated Series: Legion of Bats!.

== See also ==
- List of Batman family enemies
