= Victor Zsasz =

Fictional villain in DC Comics

- Cover art to Batman: Streets of Gotham #4 (November 2009) by Dustin Nguyen

Publication information
- Publisher: DC Comics
- First appearance: Batman: Shadow of the Bat #1 (June 1992)
- Created by: Alan Grant (writer); Norm Breyfogle (artist)

In-story information
- Species: Human
- Team affiliations: Secret Society of Super Villains; Suicide Squad
- Notable aliases: Mr. Zsasz, Bishop
- Abilities: Knife-fighting; Hand-to-hand combat

Victor Zsasz (/ˈʒæʃ/ or /ˈzæz/ or /ˈʒɒs/), also known as Mr. Zsasz or simply Zsasz, is a supervillain appearing in American comic books published by DC Comics. The character first appeared in Batman: Shadow of the Bat #1 (June 1992). He is a sadomasochistic and psychopathic serial killer who carves a tally mark onto himself for each of his victims. A recurring adversary of the superhero Batman, Zsasz belongs to the collective of enemies that make up Batman's rogues gallery.

The character has been featured in various forms of non-comics media. Most notably, Danny Jacobs has voiced Zsasz in the Batman: Arkham video game franchise, and he has been portrayed in live-action by Anthony Carrigan in the television series Gotham, Alex Morf in the Arrowverse series Batwoman, Tim Booth in the film Batman Begins (2005), and Chris Messina in the DC Extended Universe film Birds of Prey (2020).

== Publication history ==
Zsasz first appeared in Batman: Shadow of the Bat #1 (June 1992), as part of the "Batman: The Last Arkham" four-part story arc written by Alan Grant and drawn by Norm Breyfogle. As revealed in the foreword to the trade paperback of "Batman: The Last Arkham", Zsasz's name is derived from that of psychiatrist Thomas Szasz; Grant saw the name while visiting a library.

== Fictional character biography ==
=== Origin story ===
"The First Cut is the Deepest: The Secret Origin of Mr. Zsasz" was part of The Batman Chronicles #3 (December 1996). The origin story was told by Zsasz himself. It is learned that Victor Zsasz was the head of his own international company and had amassed a large personal fortune in addition to his family's wealth(The Bishops, Victors family, are 3rd cousins to the Wayne’s who had dirtier dealings, that ended up in a falling out between the families).At the age of 25, his parents died in a boating accident, sending him into a deep depression. He turned to gambling, losing money in competitions around the world. One night, he ended up in a Gotham City casino known as the Iceberg Lounge, where he gambled everything he owned and ended up losing it all to the Penguin; afterwards he saw that his life was empty, driven by desire, and there was no point to his existence. While Zsasz was attempting to commit suicide by jumping from Gotham Bridge, a homeless man tried to assault him with a knife after Zsasz refused to give him money. Instinctively grabbing the knife, Zsasz saw in the man's eyes that all life is meaningless and that nothing and no one matters. He then proceeded to stab the man to death as a "gift" for saving his life. From then on, he dedicated himself to "liberating" others from their pointless existence (Zsasz often refers to his victims as "zombies"). He usually preys on young women, but has no qualms over whom he murders. He slits his victims' throats and leaves them in lifelike poses, adding a tally mark to himself each time. He has been declared insane and is regularly incarcerated in Arkham Asylum courtesy of Batman, breaking out on occasion to carry on his killing.

=== Later story arcs ===
During his debut appearance in Batman: Shadow of the Bat's opening story arc, Batman: The Last Arkham, Zsasz bribes a contractor to include a secret passage leading out from his cell during the asylum's reconstruction under its new head, Jeremiah Arkham, who inherited the asylum from his uncle, Amadeus Arkham. Although Zsasz is restrained during the daytime when he is being treated personally by Jeremiah Arkham, he is brought back to his cell at night where he would leave the asylum through the secret passage, unbeknownst to the night guards. After murders fitting his modus operandi begin surfacing, Batman and Commissioner James Gordon fake Batman's insanity to get him inside the asylum and investigate Zsasz. Jeremiah Arkham is exceptionally brutal towards Batman, who had supposedly murdered a police officer; over the course of the "treatment", Zsasz had warped Jeremiah's mind and turned him into a mere henchman. Due to these continuous conversations with Jeremiah Arkham, Zsasz realises Batman is a plant and subsequently murders both the contractor and another inmate at Arkham who knows of Zsasz's ploy. Both Nightwing and Batman catch up to Zsasz when he tries to escape for the final time and put him back in Arkham.

Zsasz later appears in Parts 3 and 4 of Knightfall. In Part 3 of Knightfall, Zsasz takes an all-girls boarding school hostage and holds the students at knifepoint until Batman arrives, briefly leaving to kill two police officers who were sent to arrest him. Though weakened both physically and mentally due to the strain of pushing himself for so long to capture the escaped inmates, Batman fights with Zsasz and tries to ignore the lunatic's mockery. He finally snaps, after Zsasz says that they are really one and the same, and administers a savage beating. In Part 4, Zsasz's appearance is a mere cameo, depicting him being led out of the boarding school by police and Harvey Bullock personally threatening him.

During the No Man's Land storyline, Zsasz is a patient in Leslie Thompkins' field hospital for a brief while, proving to be eminently deadly even when unconscious and strapped to a stretcher when he manages to open one of the arteries of a field orderly with his fingernails. Once he wakes up, he is confronted by Thompkins, whose charity contrasts with his total emptiness; she briefly gives him pause, but is repelled by his evil. Zsasz later appears in Detective Comics #796, where he fights Stephanie Brown in her role as Robin. He attempts to slit her throat, but is distracted by her unexpected ferocity and falls back, where he attacks and attempts to kill Batman. However, Stephanie eventually defeats him. Zsasz makes a brief appearance in Infinite Crisis #7. He is part of the Secret Society of Super Villains and is one of the many of their members sent to attack Metropolis before being defeated.

Zsasz is not seen in any major villainous role again until Detective Comics #815, released in March 2006, entitled "Victims". Before a quarterly psychiatric review shortly after Infinite Crisis, Zsasz kills his guards with metal poles attached to his neck bracket and escapes to kill again. Batman hunts for Zsasz, which proves unsuccessful until Zsasz gains access to a charity event (attended by Bruce Wayne) and stabs Wayne's beloved butler, Alfred Pennyworth, in the stomach. Wayne drives Alfred to the hospital, saving his life. To lure Zsasz to him, Wayne holds a press conference in which he announces that Alfred is still alive. Having already made a scar for Alfred, Zsasz realises that his tally is off by one (Zsasz remarks: "My skin...it's crawling...every inch of it feels...wrong.") During the second part of "Victims" (Detective Comics #816), after a fight with Batman, Zsasz proceeds to the hospital to finish off Alfred. Batman catches him off-guard and knocks him unconscious, thus saving Alfred's life and sending Zsasz back to Arkham. Throughout this appearance, Cliff Chiang's artwork portrays Zsasz with visual elements commonly associated with the skinhead subculture, including work boots resembling Doc Martens, tight jeans, a white tank top, suspenders or "braces" and a close-cropped hairstyle. Additionally, Chiang's portrayal of Zsasz is more outwardly physically imposing than the gaunt, wiry physique created by Breyfogle and favored by most subsequent artists. No dialogue in the story arc references Zsasz being a skinhead nor does it explain his increased musculature and it is likely these visual elements were the decision of the artist.

Zsasz is later seen again in the Gotham Underground story arc where, in issue #3, he appears in a disguised Batman's cell at Blackgate Prison and attempts to kill him with a knife. He ends up cutting Batman's arm just as he was waking up and the resulting fight ends with Zsasz being knocked unconscious and Batman being rushed to the hospital. A naked, desperate and totally deranged Zsasz appeared in the first issue of Batman: Cacophony (2008), written by Kevin Smith, killing a young couple and threatening their children before Batman subdues him. His thoughts move so quickly that there are no spaces between the words. In the issue, Batman says that of all the criminals he fights, he hates Zsasz the most.

In the Battle For The Cowl storyline, Zsasz is recruited by a new Black Mask into a group of villains aiming to take over Gotham. This arrangement is explained further in a continuous story arc through the Streets of Gotham series, with Black Mask hiring Zsasz after he saved the former's life following a confrontation with former employee the Firefly. Black Mask presents Zsasz with a briefcase filled with cash and advises him to finally live out his dream, knowing full well any 'dream' of Zsasz's would culminate in mass murder. Apprehensive at first on how to go about this, he eventually decides to take Black Mask up on his offer, dressing in Armani suits (appearing near exactly the image of Woody Harrelson's character in Natural Born Killers) and purchasing a warehouse as his base of operations. During an investigation into several children murdered by Zsasz and their bodies discovered by Humpty Dumpty, Damian Wayne is 'captured' by a man soliciting runaway kids with the promise of a free meal and a place to stay. Damian discovers the man to be a close associate of Victor Zsasz and that Zsasz has been slowly building a financial empire using runaway children and kidnapped orphans in a 'fight to the death' arena where people bet on the winners. The winning child faces a new contestant, and so on, until the last child left fights Zsasz one-on-one, with the promise of freedom for winning (with it clearly evident none have won thus far). Having seen the horrors that Zsasz has left, as well as a haunting memory of seeing the dead bodies of the children he killed, Damian questions why Bruce or Dick have allowed a man like Zsasz to be left alive, despite their moral code against murder. Damian manages to subdue Victor and attack him viciously with a sword, after which he falls into Gotham Harbor. Not wanting to defy his mentor and late father's beliefs, he promises Dick that the blow was not fatal since he "missed Zsasz's spine", but indicated that his chances of survival were slim.

Zsasz is later seen in captivity in Detective Comics #865, after Black Mask's (Jeremiah Arkham) apprehension, in Arkham Asylum. While no reference is made to Zsasz's injury (nor does he appear to be injured), his presence in Arkham alongside Jeremiah strongly suggests the events of this issue take place subsequent to the injury, meaning he did survive the attack.

=== The New 52 ===
Zsasz has appeared various times in The New 52 (a 2011 reboot of the DC Comics universe) as an inmate of Arkham, and he is later seen attacking Batgirl in the Narrows, while on Venom. Zsasz next appears in Detective Comics (vol. 2) #18 written by John Layman. He is released from Arkham Asylum by the Joker prior to the events of Death of the Family. Later, he is hired by Ignatius Ogilvy, the Emperor Penguin, to "leave [his] mark on Gotham City"; he is given a knife with the Emperor Penguin's insignia on it. Zsasz is later instructed to put the Man-Bat serum on the knife, as part of the Emperor Penguin's plan to turn the population of Gotham City into Man-Bats through an airborne virus. Zsasz is temporarily transformed into one. During the Forever Evil storyline, Nightwing had just retrieved Victor Zsasz from Chicago and was bringing him back to Arkham Asylum. Victor Zsasz was then abducted by Superwoman and Owlman.

=== DC Rebirth ===
In the DC Rebirth reboot, Batman and Duke Thomas investigate a series of murders linked to Zsasz. Flashbacks to the 2017 story arc The War of Jokes and Riddles reveals that Zsasz sided with the Riddler in a war against the Joker He briefly joins a gang of villains assembled by Killer Moth. In Doomsday Clock, Zsasz appears as an inmate of Arkham Asylum.

=== All In ===
Victor Zsasz considers his victims, male and female, to be his betrothed. He not only makes a cut in his own skin, but makes one in the skin of each victim as well, as if exchanging rings, "marrying" them in heavenly matrimony by the blade. He finds this romantic, and continues to "speak" to his dead "spouses" through the scars.

== Powers and abilities ==
In addition to his wiry-yet-tall physique, Zsasz is extremely agile and flexible, able to go toe-to-toe with even Batman for brief bouts. Though he favors slitting his victims' throats with knives, he has no reservations about tossing blades at opponents if the occasion calls for it, and even carries several spare knives for this purpose. Though he personally dislikes guns, considering them "unreliable", Zsasz is known to occasionally carry firearms to coerce his selected victims. Even barehanded, Zsasz is a formidable opponent; as he is locked away in an enormous steel containment unit for 16 hours a day, he has made a habit of practicing isometrics in the cramped space to strengthen his body.

Zsasz is incredibly intelligent and is described as having "a brilliant criminal mind". He is constantly thinking quickly both while incarcerated and active, and some of his escapes have been a result of his cunning schemes. Zsasz is completely unpredictable, having no qualms about who he kills, when and where. Thus, he is almost impossible to track, even if signs of his modus operandi appear evident, as there is no motive or clue trail to follow. Such unpredictability also renders him a danger to anyone and everyone who may encounter him.

During the Streets of Gotham story arc, it is learned that Zsasz sees the world as bathed in red, and everyone in it as a victim he has murdered. He envisions both friend (Black Mask) and foe (Dick Grayson) as having died at his hand with their throats slashed. During his battle with Damian, Zsasz begins to lose his composure when he begins to see him as a living human being rather than as a dead body.

== Other versions ==
- An alternate universe variant of Victor Zsasz appears in Batman: Crimson Mist as one of several Arkham Asylum inmates killed by a vampiric Batman.
- An alternate universe variant of Victor Zsasz appears in Flashpoint. This version is an inmate of the military Doom prison before being killed by Heat Wave during a prison break.

== In other media ==
=== Television ===
- Victor Zsasz appears in Gotham, portrayed by Anthony Carrigan. This version works as a hitman for Carmine Falcone and is often accompanied by female contract killers. After Falcone retires and leaves Gotham in the first season finale, Zsasz defects to Oswald Cobblepot and works for other criminals, such as Fish Mooney and Butch Gilzean.
- Victor Zsasz appears in Harley Quinn, voiced by Brad Morris.
- Victor Zsasz appears in the Batwoman episode "Bat Girl Magic!", portrayed by Alex Morf. This version is a hitman who has prior history with Ryan Wilder.

=== Film ===
- Victor Zsasz appears in Batman Begins, portrayed by Tim Booth. This version is an enforcer for Carmine Falcone.
- Victor Zsasz appears in Batman: Assault on Arkham.
- Victor Zsasz appears in Birds of Prey, portrayed by Chris Messina. This version works for Roman Sionis / Black Mask and took part in killing Helena Bertinelli's family years prior, for which she later kills Zsasz in the present.
- Victor Zsasz appears in Injustice, voiced by Reid Scott.
- Victor Zsasz appears in Justice League Dark: Apokolips War.
- Victor Zsasz appears in Batman: Knightfall, voiced by Andrew Morgado.
- Victor Zsasz will appear in The Batman: Part II.

=== Video games ===
- Victor Zsasz appears as a boss in Batman: Dark Tomorrow, voiced by Michael Wright.
- Victor Zsasz appears in the Batman Begins tie-in game, voiced by Tim Booth.
- Victor Zsasz appears in the Nintendo DS version of Lego Batman: The Video Game.
- Victor Zsasz appears as a character summon in Scribblenauts Unmasked: A DC Comics Adventure.
- Victor Zsasz appears as a mini-boss in the Nintendo DS version of Lego Batman 2: DC Super Heroes.
- Victor Zsasz appears in Batman: The Telltale Series, voiced by Kiff VandenHeuvel.
- Victor Zsasz makes a cameo appearance in a flashback depicted in Injustice 2, voiced by Steve Blum. This version was killed by Robin years prior.

==== Batman Arkham ====
Victor Zsasz appears in the Batman: Arkham franchise, voiced by Danny Jacobs.

- Zsasz first appears in Batman: Arkham Asylum as an inmate of the titular asylum who takes part in the Joker's takeover.
- As of Batman: Arkham City, Zsasz was transferred to the eponymous mega-prison. In a side mission, he takes several hostages and forces Batman to find various payphones within a set amount of time or else he will kill them. All throughout, he tells Batman of his backstory, in which he was cheated out of his money by the Penguin and made his first kill shortly afterward. Ever since, he feels his only purpose in life is killing. Eventually, Batman finds and subdues Zsasz and rescues his remaining hostages.
- Zsasz makes a cameo appearance in Batman: Arkham Knight. Audio files of Zsasz were also found inside the game's code, indicating that the character may have had a larger role that was scrapped.

=== Miscellaneous ===
- Victor Zsasz appears in the novelization for Batman Begins.
- Victor Zsasz makes a minor appearance in the Batman: Arkham City prequel comic book.
- The Injustice incarnation of Victor Zsasz appears in Injustice: Gods Among Us: Year Five, in which he kills Alfred Pennyworth before Damian Wayne kills Zsasz in turn.
- The Batman: Arkham incarnation of Victor Zsasz appears in Suicide Squad: Kill Arkham Asylum, where he is killed by King Shark.

== See also ==
- List of Batman family enemies
