= Batman: Cataclysm =

DC Comics crossover story arc

- Cover of Batman: Cataclysm trade paperback. Art by Matt Hollingsworth.
- Publisher: DC Comics
- Publication date: January – March 1998
- Genre: Superhero; Crossover
Title(s)
- Azrael #40
- Batman #553-559
- The Batman Chronicles #12, 14
- Batman: Arkham Asylum - Tales of Madness #1
- Batman: Blackgate - Isle of Men #1
- Batman/Huntress/Spoiler: Blunt Trauma #1
- Batman: Shadow of the Bat #73-79
- Catwoman (vol. 2) #56-57
- Detective Comics #719-722, 724-726
- Nightwing (vol. 2) #19-20
- Robin (vol. 2) #52-54
- Main character(s): Batman; Oracle; Nightwing; Robin; Catwoman; Huntress

Cataclysm is an 18-chapter DC Comics crossover story arc that ran through the various Batman family comics from March to May 1998. The plot of the storyline centers on Gotham City being hit by a powerful earthquake, the epicenter of which is less than a mile from Wayne Manor. In the wake of the destruction, Batman and his allies join the frantic rescue efforts around the devastated city, which soon spirals into chaos. This story arc was a catalyst for the Batman comics and its spin-off titles, signaling the beginning of nearly two years of storylines that arose from the earthquake's aftermath, culminating in the year-long Batman: No Man's Land saga. Cataclysm itself takes place a short time after the events of Batman: Contagion and Batman: Legacy, two previous crises which also nearly resulted in Gotham City's destruction.

== Plot ==
Seismologist Dr. Jolene Relazzo believes the Gotham area is due for a major earthquake as her gear begins registering hits nearing the city. Oracle loses connection with the Batcave at 7:03 p.m. while giving a report when a 7.6 earthquake hits Gotham City. Batman is swept up by the rising currents from an underground stream and Alfred falls into the cave from the crumbling Wayne Manor above. Oracle heads to Gotham City Police Department HQ to find her father and rally the troops.

Shortly after the quake, it appears Wayne-owned buildings are the only ones left without major structural damage. Bruce Wayne had seen to it that all of his buildings were quake-proof up to 8.5. However, unable to quake-proof his own home without exposing his secrets as Batman, Wayne Manor and the Batcave are destroyed. With all the exits blocked, Batman straps on scuba gear and promises Alfred that he will be back soon. Barbara Gordon rallies the police force, and Detective Harvey Bullock finds Commissioner Gordon. At 8:52 p.m., the first aftershock hits.

Dick Grayson (Nightwing) learns of the earthquake from TV while at work. He bolts, grabs a boat, and heads to his former home. Taken aback by the sheer destruction in Gotham City, he begins helping victims trapped under a collapsed highway as soon as he gets ashore.

Azrael and Nomoz arrive in Gotham City by helicopter to deliver Bane to the GCPD. After the quake hits, Bane escapes. Azrael tracks and captures him after he kills two civilians in a bank.

Helena Bertinelli is on the subway when the quake hits. She quickly changes into her Huntress costume and begins getting survivors to safety. Batman surfaces in Gotham Harbor and is horrified by seeing the city he loves in flames.

The Catwoman was stealing night-vision binoculars for an upcoming job when the department store is destroyed by the earthquake. After having a young girl die in her arms, she begins getting the survivors to safety. Later, she starts tracking Poison Ivy and stops her from spreading super-fertilizer into Gotham City's water supply.

Robin (Tim Drake) performs CPR on Lady Shiva as Dava attacks Dorrance and his men. Shiva is revived by the drug still in Robin's system. Dava is shot in the melee and Shiva goes berserk on Dorrance's people. Robin gets Dava to her people and leaves her there. Tim's flight home is diverted to Blüdhaven. He sees Gotham City on fire from the plane. He steals a motorcycle and heads toward his home.

The quake and the ensuing tidal waves hit Blackgate Prison hard. The island and many cells are flooded, and prisoners escape. A land bridge forms from the island all the way to mainland Gotham City. Batman, just surfacing in Gotham Harbor, realizes what is going on and makes his way to the prison. He quiets the rioting prisoners, though many had been killed and others escaped via the land bridge. The aftershocks remove the land bridge as S.W.A.T. helicopters arrive. Batman reaches the mainland and begins helping victims. Later, he speaks with the Penguin about his "enterprises".

At Arkham Asylum, many inmates are freed into the public areas of the facility when the quake hits. The Joker, Killer Croc, the Scarecrow, the Riddler, and others take three guards hostage and kill two of them. They decide to tell stories to the third man, a new guard going to school to become a psychiatrist. They scare him into dementia before Arkham's generator kicks in and they are rounded up.

An odd band of small-time crooks hired by WayneCorp save a group of people trapped in a building. A young boy is convinced that Batman sent them. Penguin, walking through the rubble, decides which people to help based on how they can repay the favor. Robin arrives and helps out in the excavation while thinking of his own family and friends.

Nightwing and Robin meet at the clock tower to see if the Oracle is okay — it is the first time Barbara and Tim meet face-to-face. No one had seen Batman because he was saving victims from rubble in the guise of a police officer. Nightwing and Robin then check out the destruction at Wayne Manor and the cave. Tim rushes off to check on his father, while Dick locates Alfred and Harold.

Batman searches for Dr. Rellazzo, who was abducted earlier. GCPD reviews a videotape delivered to them claiming responsibility for the earthquake: the "Quakemaster" wants $100 million. Barbara Gordon readies a fake ransom payment and Batman stows away on the pick-up helicopter with it. He gathers the henchmen who picked up the ransom, but their boss gets away. Later, he meets with Robin and Nightwing to discuss the situation.

Stephanie Brown, caught in a mall during the earthquake, quickly changes into her Spoiler costume. She slips after rescuing a small child, but the Huntress swoops down and catches her. The Cluemaster, the Ratcatcher, the Firefly, and others make their way to Gotham City after crossing the land bridge from Blackgate. They arrive at the mall and begin looting. The Huntress and the Spoiler battle them, capturing all but the Cluemaster (the Spoiler's father).

Robin continues to investigate the Quakemaster's tape while Nightwing and Batman head out. The Quakemaster's people kidnap Detective "Hardback" Bock and hold Commissioner Gordon and Mayor Marion Grange hostage in the Mayor's office. Believing he has a lead on the Quakemaster, Robin heads out and meets up with Bullock and Renee Montoya. Robin rescues Bock, and together they take down the Quakemaster, who was Arnold Wesker's newest puppet. Nightwing saves Gordon and Grange, while Batman continues helping survivors.

== Collected edition ==
All of the stories (except Robin (vol. 2) #52, Azrael #40, Catwoman (vol. 2) #57, and Batman: Arkham Asylum - Tales of Madness #1) were collected into a trade paperback. A new edition was released in June 2015 which included the issues that were not part of the original release.
