= Batman: Legacy =

Crossover story arc

- Front cover of Batman: Legacy trade paperback
- Publisher: DC Comics
- Publication date: 1996
- Genre: Superhero; Crossover
Title(s)
Batman 533-534
Batman: Bane
Bane of the Demon #1-4
Batman: Shadow of the Bat #53-54
Catwoman #33-36
Detective Comics #700-702
Robin #32-33
- Main character(s): Batman; Robin; Nightwing; Ra's al Ghul; Bane; Oracle; Huntress; Talia al Ghul; Catwoman; Azrael

Creative team
- Writer(s): Chuck Dixon, Doug Moench, Alan Grant
- Penciller(s): Graham Nolan, Jim Aparo, Staz Johnson, Dave Taylor, Jim Balent, Mike Wieringo
- Inker(s): Scott Hanna, Stan Woch, Bill Stenkiewicz, Rob Leigh, Ray McCarthy, Bob Smith
- Letterer(s): John Costanza, Tim Harkins, Todd Klein, Bill Oakley, Albert de Guzman
- Colorist(s): Gloria Vasquez, Adrienne Roy, Pamela Rambo, Lee Loughridge, Buzz Setzer, Greg Wright

Legacy is a crossover story arc in the Batman American comic book series. It is a sequel to another Batman story arc, Contagion, and also serves as a follow-up to the Knightfall story arc.

The tagline is: "The stakes are higher than they've ever been as Batman and his outnumbered forces race to solve a riddle from the distant past that threatens to erase all of mankind's tomorrow".

The story concerns the returning outbreak of a lethal disease in Gotham City, and Batman's attempts to combat it with his closest allies by discovering its origin in the Middle East. The disease is known as the Apocalypse Plague, the Filovirus, Ebola Gulf A, or its more popular nickname: the Clench. The searchers include Batman, Robin, Oracle, Nightwing, Huntress, Azrael, and Catwoman.

There, Batman faces two of his deadliest foes: Ra's al Ghul and Bane. The Gotham Knights travel throughout the world as they race to stop the League of Assassins from releasing the pure strain of the virus around the world, and Gotham itself would be a place for the rematch between the Dark Knight and Bane. Ra's continues his search for the suitable mate for his daughter, Talia al Ghul. Meanwhile, Batman leads the chase for a cure to save the life of Tim Drake (Robin) and prevent the end of the world. The events of this lead into Batman: Cataclysm (though there was a gap of over a year between the two story arcs), which itself leads into Batman: No Man's Land.

1st Edition - 1st printing. Collects Batman (1940-2011) #533-534, Batman: Shadow of the Bat (1992-2000) #53-54, Catwoman (1993-2001 2nd Series) #35-36, Detective Comics (1937-2011 1st Series) #699-702, and Robin (1993-2009) #31-33. Written by Chuck Dixon, Doug Moench, and Alan Grant. Art by Graham Nolan, Jim Aparo, Staz Johnson, Dave Taylor, Jim Balent, and Mike Wieringo. Batman and his small cadre of allies race against the clock to stop a threat from the past that may wipe out mankind's future.

== Reading order ==
Legacy reading order:

- Prequel: Catwoman #33-35
- Prequel: Bane of the Demon #1–4
- Prelude: Shadow of the Bat #53
- Prelude: Batman #533
- Part 1: Detective Comics #700
- Part 2: Catwoman #36
- Part 3: Robin #32
- Part 4: Shadow of the Bat #54
- Part 5: Batman #534
- Part 6: Detective Comics #701
- Part 7: Robin #33
- Epilogue: Detective Comics #702
- Epilogue: Batman: Bane (one-shot)

== Plot ==
Catwoman #33

Catwoman travels to Rheelasia to steal back a microchip before it can be copied and pirated. She obtains the chip easily, but is attacked and abducted by a group led by Hellhound.

Catwoman #34

"The Collector" uncovers an ancient journal describing an underground wheel. It is heavily booby-trapped and Catwoman is to be the front line going in. A former member of the Order of St. Dumas, who had translated much of the journal, accompanies them. He and Catwoman enters the labyrinth as Hellhound's men are attacked.

Catwoman #35

They make it through the traps and to the wheel. Hellhound, Catwoman, and the translator are attacked by a large, unidentified man. Catwoman wakes up in a cell.

Batman: Shadow of the Bat #53

Bruce tells Tim about the new mutation of the Clench. He calls Azrael for more information. Batman, Nightwing, and Robin prepared to leave for Sudan. D.A. Voder reports to Penguin on the city's affairs. Huntress continues taking down looters raiding the homes of Clench victims; Robin informs her that she will be in charge of Gotham City while they are gone. Batman brings Gordon up to speed on the situation.

Batman #533

Batman, Nightwing, and Robin land in the desert and find the entrance point Azrael described. After taking out the guards, Batman finds what appears to be a map, and guides them through the maze. At the end of the tunnel, they are met by three shadows.

Detective Comics #700

Ra's al Ghul, Talia, and Ubu (Ra's servant) stand above Batman, Nightwing, and Robin. Ra's orders them killed. Nightwing is wounded while running for cover. They discover that the ancient wheel beneath the desert has generated a plague virus, part of Ra's' plan to "cleanse" the world of 90% of humanity. His technicians finish digitally rendering the wheel; Ra's orders the entire underground facility, including the wheel, destroyed, so Ubu floods the caves. Batman is able to get himself and Robin to safety, as Nightwing faces off against Ra's. His two partners arrive soon after. Ra's escapes with Talia and Ubu, who takes off his mask to reveal himself as Bane.

Catwoman #36

Catwoman breaks free from her cell and frees Umberto (the translator) and Hellhound, who makes a temporary truce with her. Outside the compound, she defeats Hellhound and ties him up. Catwoman and Umberto set out toward civilization. Batman gets word from Oracle of the three destinations that Ra's has taken; Nightwing and Robin leave for Paris and Batman heads for Edinburgh, agreeing to meet up in Gotham City later.

Robin #32

Nightwing and Robin split up in Paris to cover more ground. Robin meets up with Henri Ducard and tells him what is going on before meeting back up with Nightwing. They find the spot - Nightwing goes into the sewers below the Louvre, while Robin goes into the city's various other tourist attractions. Nightwing takes out the plague spreaders below, while Robin and Ducard take care of Ra's al Ghul's agents inside. Nightwing and Robin then head back to Gotham City.

Batman: Shadow of the Bat #54

Batman is able to stop the dispersion of the virus in Edinburgh. Robin informs him that they were successful in Paris, but Oracle says that Calcutta will be the next target. Batman heads to this new destination.

Batman #534

Oracle contacts Batman in Calcutta and directs him to meet with a contact. While waiting he meets a young boy who offers to help Batman in his "admirable enterprise". Batman tells to him to keep his distance because there could be danger. The contact then arrives and turns out to be Lady Shiva. The duo is attacked by Ra's al Ghul's men shortly after and a brief fight breaks out. After the scuffle, Batman takes a ring from one of the assailants, which he gives to a merchant and tells him to feed the boy well. The pair locate Ra's' agents at the festival of Durga attempting to release the virus into the water supply. Batman and Lady Shiva chase down the men responsible. During the fight, one of the culprits pulls out a gun, and having followed Batman, the boy he met earlier jumps on the back of the man with the gun ruining his aim. The boy is knocked to the ground and shot. Batman disables the shooter and asks him where the virus is. Before killing himself with a poison capsule hidden in a tooth, the man tells Batman that the virus is in a soluble wax container hidden in a statue that was already thrown into the river. Batman jumps from the bridge and manages to reach the container and get back to the surface while it is still intact. He then finds the boy still alive and tells Lady Shiva that, because the boy almost died but killed no one, he chose the path of a hero.

Detective Comics #701

Back in Gotham City, Batman finds Ra's al Ghul's agents at the site of an upcoming grand opening of a casino. Bane is there and attacks him. Batman sabotages the building and it explodes. His rage helps him defeat Bane, but the current from the river below the casino drags him away. Nightwing, Robin, and Huntress pursue Ra's by boat.

Robin #33

Robin, Nightwing, and Huntress make it aboard Ra's al Ghul's yacht as Batman continues to search for Bane. Robin find the computers with the plague information and sends it to Oracle. Nightwing and Huntress put up a fight against Ra's' agents, but he and Talia capture them. They also attack Robin, leading to an explosion. He gets Huntress and Nightwing off the ship before it explodes; Oracle gets the entire program in time. Renee Montoya and Harvey Bullock discover dozens of mobsters who washed ashore from Blüdhaven.

Detective Comics #702

Wayne Pharmaceuticals begins disbursing the antidote to Ra's al Ghul's plague. Ra's' remaining Gotham agents attack GCPD headquarters with a suicide bombing. Gordon and former Commissioner Sarah Essen-Gordon, along with the rest of the force, drive them away. The estranged couple make up and head home.

Batman: Bane

Bane hijacks a mobile nuclear power plant, intending to irradiate Gotham City into a wasteland. With the combined efforts of Batman, Robin, Nightwing and the plant's owner, however, Bane's plan is thwarted.
