= Batman: Shadow of the Bat =

Comic book series by Alan Grant

- Cover of Batman: Shadow of the Bat #1 (June 1992), art by Norm Breyfogle and Brian Stelfreeze.

Publication information
- Publisher: DC Comics
- Schedule: Monthly
- Format: Ongoing series
- Publication date: June 1992 – February 2000
- No. of issues: 96
- Main character: Batman

Creative team
- Written by: Alan Grant
- Artists: Norm Breyfogle; Bret Blevins; Dave Taylor; Mark Buckingham

Batman: Shadow of the Bat is a comic book series featuring Batman, published by the comic book publishing company DC Comics. The series ran for 96 issues, from 1992 to 2000. The stories took place in Batman's then-current continuity along with Detective Comics and Batman, in contrast to Batman: Legends of the Dark Knight, which focused on Batman's early years. Batman: Shadow of the Bat looked into the psyche of the various cast members of the Batman comics. It was also notable for introducing the villain Victor Zsasz into the Batman mythos.

The majority of issues were written by Alan Grant, who had previously been the main writer on Detective Comics from issue #583 to #621 (cover-dated February 1988 to September 1990) and on Batman from issue #455 to #480 (cover-dated October 1990 to Late June 1992).

== Publication history ==
Batman: Shadow of the Bat #1 (cover-dated June 1992) went on sale three weeks after Alan Grant's final issue of Batman. Its first story arc, the four-part storyline "Batman: The Last Arkham", saw the introduction of several new characters such as Jeremiah Arkham and Victor Zsasz.

Fifty of the series' 96 monthly issues were part of various crossovers with other titles. Issues #16-30 tied into the "Batman: Knightfall" storyline. Issues #73 and #74 were a part of the "Batman: Cataclysm" storyline, which was a top vote-getter for the Comics Buyer's Guide Fan Award for Favorite Story for 1999. Issue #80 was part of a special "flip-book" along with Azrael #47, where both issues were part of the same book. The #1,000,000 issue was a part of the "DC One Million" storyline, which was a top vote-getter for the Comics Buyer's Guide Fan Award for Favorite Story for 1999. Issues #83 through #94 were parts of the "No Man's Land" storyline that won the Comics Buyer's Guide Fan Award for Favorite Story of 2000.

Grant's run as writer ended with issue #82, before the series was integrated into the year-long crossover storyline "Batman: No Man's Land". Afterward, the series was written by a variety of writers. Batman: Shadow of the Bat was canceled at the end of "No Man's Land" and was immediately replaced with the new series Batman: Gotham Knights.

== Collected editions ==
The first four issues of the series were collected in Batman: The Last Arkham, and various other issues have been included, among other titles, in a number of trade paperbacks. In more recent times, DC Comics have been publishing this material in new, thicker trade paperbacks. This includes four volumes of Shadow of the Bat, through new editions of No Man's Land. In 2017, DC started publishing oversized hardcover editions of the event Knightfall, in three volumes, which collect many issues of the series.

New edition trade paperback title	Shadow of the Bat material collected	Other material collected	Publication date	ISBN
Shadow of the Bat Vol. 1	Batman: Shadow of the Bat #1-12		June 2016	978-1401263195
Shadow of the Bat Vol. 2	Batman: Shadow of the Bat #13-23, Annual #1		January 2017	978-1401265885
Shadow of the Bat Vol. 3	Batman: Shadow of the Bat #0, 24–31, Annual #2		January 2018	978-1401275204
Shadow of the Bat Vol. 4	Batman: Shadow of the Bat #32-43		March 2019	978-1401288051
Contagion	Batman: Shadow of the Bat #48-52	Azrael #15-16, Batman #529, The Batman Chronicles (1995) #4, Catwoman (1993) #31-32, Detective Comics #695-696, Robin (1993) #27-28	March 2016	978-1401260682
Legacy Vol. 1	Batman: Shadow of the Bat #53	Batman #533, Catwoman (1993) #53-35, Detective Comics #697-700, Robin (1993) #31	April 2017	978-1401272029
Legacy Vol. 2	Batman: Shadow of the Bat #54	Batman #534, Batman: Bane OGN, Batman: Bane of the Demon #1-4, Catwoman (1993) #36, Detective Comics #701-702, Robin (1993) #32-33	February 2018	978-1401277611
Cataclysm	Batman: Shadow of the Bat #73-74	Azrael #40, Batman #553-554, The Batman Chronicles (1995) #12, Batman: Arkham Asylum - Tales of Madness #1, Batman: Blackgate - Isle of Men #1, Batman: Spoiler/Huntress: Blunt Trauma #1, Catwoman (1993) #56-57, Detective Comics #719-721, Nightwing (1996) #19-20, Robin (1993) #52-53	October 2015	978-1401255152
Road to No Man's Land Vol. 1	Batman: Shadow of the Bat #75-79	Batman #555-559, The Batman Chronicles (1995) #16, Detective Comics #722, #724-726, Robin (1993) #54	October 2015	978-1401258276
Road to No Man's Land Vol. 2	Batman: Shadow of the Bat #80-82	Azrael: Agent of the Bat #47-50, Batman #560-562, The Batman Chronicles (1995) #15, Batman: No Man's Land Secret Files (1999) #1, Detective Comics #727-729	July 2016	978-1401232283
No Man's Land Vol. 1	Batman: Shadow of the Bat #83-86	Azrael: Agent of the Bat #51-55, Batman #563-566, The Batman Chronicles (1995) #16, Batman: Legends of the Dark Knight (1989) #116-118, No Man's Land #1, Detective Comics #730-733	December 2011	978-1401232283
No Man's Land Vol. 2	Batman: Shadow of the Bat #87-88	Azrael: Agent of the Bat #56-57, Batman #567-568, The Batman Chronicles (1995) #17, Batman: Legends of the Dark Knight (1989) #119-121, No Man's Land Gallery #1, Catwoman (1993) #72-74, Detective Comics #734-735, Nightwing (1996) #35-37, Robin (1993) #67, Young Justice in No Man's Land #1	April 2012	978-1401233808
No Man's Land Vol. 3	Batman: Shadow of the Bat #89-92	Azrael: Agent of the Bat #58, Batman #569-571, Batman: Legends of the Dark Knight (1989) #122-124, No Man's Land Secret Files #1, Detective Comics #736-738, Robin (1993) #68-72	August 2012	978-1401234560
No Man's Land Vol. 4	Batman: Shadow of the Bat #93-94	Azrael: Agent of the Bat #59-61, Batman #572-574, The Batman Chronicles (1995) #18, Batman: Legends of the Dark Knight (1989) #125-126, No Man's Land #0, No Man's Land Gallery (1999) #1, Catwoman (1993) #75-77, Detective Comics #739-741, Nightwing (1996) #38-39, Robin (1993) #73	December 2012	978-1401235642

Omnibus title	Shadow of the Bat material collected	Other material collected	Publication date	ISBN
Batman: Knightfall Vol. 1 Omnibus	Batman: Shadow of the Bat #16-18	Batman #484-500, Batman Villains Secret Files (1998) #1, Batman: Vengeance of Bane (1993) #1, Detective Comics #654-666, Showcase '93 #7-8	April 2017	978-1401270421
Batman: Knightfall Vol. 2: Knightquest Omnibus	Batman: Shadow of the Bat #19-28	Batman #501-508, Batman: Legends of the Dark Knight (1989) #59-61, Catwoman (1993) #6-7, Detective Comics (1937) #667-675, Justice League Task Force (1993) #5-6, Robin (1993) #1-2, #7, Showcase '94 #7	November 2017	978-1401274368
Batman: Knightfall Vol. 3: Knightsend Omnibus	Batman: Shadow of the Bat #29-35	Batman #509-510, #512-515, Batman: Legends of the Dark Knight #62-63, Batman: Vengeance of Bane II, Catwoman (1993) #12-13, Detective Comics #676-677, #679-682, Nightwing: Alfred's Return #1, Robin (1993) #8-9, #11-14, Showcase '94 #10	May 2018	978-1401278496
Batman: Road to No Man's Land Omnibus	Batman: Shadow of the Bat #73-82	Batman #554-562, Detective Comics #719-722, #724-729, Catwoman #56-57, Robin (1993) #52-54, Azrael: Agent of the Bat #40, #47-50, Nightwing #19-20, The Batman Chronicles #12, #14-15, Batman: Arkham Asylum - Tales of Madness #1, Batman: Blackgate - Isle of Men #1, Batman: Huntress/Spoiler - Blunt Trauma #1	October 2020	9781779506610
Batman: No Man's Land Omnibus volume 1	Batman: Shadow of the Bat #83-88	Batman #563-568, Detective Comics #730-735, Batman: Legends of the Dark Knight #116-121, Catwoman #72-74, Robin (1993) #67, Azrael: Agent of the Bat #51-57, Nightwing #35-37, The Batman Chronicles #16-17, Batman: No Man's Land (Collector's) #1, Batman: No Man's Land Gallery #1, and Young Justice In No Man's Land #1	January 2022	9781779513229
Batman: No Man's Land Omnibus volume 2	Batman: Shadow of the Bat #89-94	Batman #569-574, Detective Comics #736-741, Batman: Legends of the Dark Knight #122-126, Catwoman #75-77, Robin (1993) #68-73, Azrael: Agent of the Bat #58-61, Nightwing #38-39, The Batman Chronicles #18, Batman No Man's Land #0; and Batman: No Man's Land Secret Files #1	September 2022	9781779517142

Trade paperback title	Material collected	Publication date	ISBN
Batman: The Last Arkham	Batman: Shadow of the Bat #1-4	October 1995	978-1563891908
Batman: Knightfall, Part Two: Who Rules the Night	Batman: Shadow of the Bat #16-18, Batman #498-500, Detective Comics #664-666, Showcase '93 #7-8	September 1993	978-1563891489
Batman: Knightfall, Part Three: KnightsEnd	Batman: Shadow of the Bat #29-30,Batman #509-510, Batman: Legends of the Dark Knight #62-63, Catwoman #12-13, Detective Comics #676-677, Robin #8-9	June 1995	978-1563891915
Tales of the Batman: Tim Sale	Batman: Legends of the Dark Knight #32-34, Batman: Shadow of the Bat #7-9, Showcase '94 #3-4, Solo #1	January 2009	978-1401217358
Batman: Prodigal	Batman: Shadow of the Bat #32-34,Batman #512-514, Detective Comics #679-681, Robin #11-13	January 1998	978-1563893346
Batman: Anarky	Batman: Shadow of the Bat #40-41, Anarky #1-4, The Batman Chronicles #1, Detective Comics #608-609	February 1999	978-1563894374
Batman: Contagion	Batman: Shadow of the Bat #48-49, Azrael #15-16, Batman #529, The Batman Chronicles #4, Catwoman #31-32, Detective Comics #695-696, Robin #27-28	April 1996	978-1563892936
Batman: Legacy	Batman: Shadow of the Bat #53-54, Batman #533-534, Catwoman #35-36, Detective Comics #699-702, Robin #31-33	February 1997	978-1563893377
Batman: Cataclysm	Batman: Shadow of the Bat #73-74 Batman #553-554, The Batman Chronicles #12, Batman: Blackgate - Isle of Men #1, Batman/Spoiler/Huntress: Blunt Trauma #1, Catwoman #56, Detective Comics #719-721, Nightwing #19-20, Robin #53	June 1999	978-1563895272
Batman: No Man's Land, Vol. 1	Batman: Shadow of the Bat #83-84, Batman #563-564, Batman: Legends of the Dark Knight #116, Batman: No Man's Land #1, Detective Comics #730-731	September 1999	978-1563895647
Batman: No Man's Land Vol. 2	Batman: Shadow of the Bat #85-87, Batman #565, The Batman Chronicles #16, Batman: Legends of the Dark Knight #117, #119, Detective Comics #732-733	February 2000	978-1563895999
Batman: No Man's Land Vol. 3	Batman: Shadow of the Bat #88, Batman #566-569, Batman: Legends of the Dark Knight #120-121, Detective Comics #734-735	October 2000	978-1563896347
Batman: No Man's Land Vol. 4	Batman: Shadow of the Bat #92-93, Batman #571-572, The Batman Chronicles #18, Batman: Legends of the Dark Knight #125, Detective Comics #736, #738-739	December 2000	978-1563896989
Batman: No Man's Land Vol. 5	Batman: Shadow of the Bat #94, Batman #573-574, Batman: Legends of the Dark Knight #126, No Man's Land #0, Detective Comics #740-741	April 2001	978-1563897092
