= The Batman: Part II =

Upcoming superhero film

- Official logo
- Directed by: Matt Reeves (Note: Steven Soderbergh joined to oversee the remainder of physical production on Reeves's behalf after he had to step away from set to focus on a personal family matter. It remains unclear what credit Soderbergh will receive for his contributions.)
- Written by: Matt Reeves; Mattson Tomlin
- Based on: Characters from DC
- Produced by: Dylan Clark; Matt Reeves; Lynn Harris; James Gunn; Peter Safran
- Starring: Robert Pattinson; Jeffrey Wright; Andy Serkis; Colin Farrell; Sebastian Stan; Scarlett Johansson; Charles Dance
- Cinematography: Erik Messerschmidt
- Music by: Michael Giacchino
- Production companies: DC Studios; 6th & Idaho; Dylan Clark Productions
- Distributed by: Warner Bros. Pictures
- Release date: February 18, 2028
- Country: United States
- Language: English

The Batman: Part II is an upcoming American superhero film directed by Matt Reeves from a screenplay he wrote with Mattson Tomlin. Based on the DC Comics character Batman, it is the sequel to The Batman (2022). Robert Pattinson stars as Bruce Wayne / Batman alongside Jeffrey Wright, Andy Serkis, Colin Farrell, Sebastian Stan, Scarlett Johansson, and Charles Dance. Set during the winter, Batman investigates further corruption after the flooding of Gotham City. Warner Bros. Pictures will distribute the film, which Reeves also produces with Lynn Harris and Dylan Clark, alongside James Gunn and Peter Safran of DC Studios.

A sequel to The Batman was announced in April 2022, with Reeves and Pattinson set to return. DC Studios inherited the film later that year, but it remained separate from its main franchise, the DC Universe (DCU). Reeves wrote the script with Tomlin, his uncredited writing partner on The Batman, from late 2022 to June 2025. The lengthy and meticulous writing process contributed to multiple production delays, which were also attributed to the effects of the 2023 Hollywood strikes and Reeves's personal issues. Part II focuses more on Batman's Bruce Wayne alter ego than previous Batman films due to its mystery storyline, which Reeves sought to elevate from the first film and keep secret during production, and is set up by the events of the spin-off television series The Penguin (2024).

Pre-production commenced in August 2025, with some crew changes from the first film due to other commitments, particularly Erik Messerschmidt taking over as cinematographer. New cast members joined from December to May 2026, before filming started the following month, taking place primarily on soundstages at Warner Bros. Studios Leavesden, with location shooting in England and Scotland. After Reeves stepped away from physical production in October for a family matter, Steven Soderbergh joined to help direct the remainder of principal photography on his behalf. Filming was extended until early 2027. Michael Giacchino was expected to return to compose the musical score.

The Batman: Part II is scheduled to be theatrically released in the United States on February 18, 2028, following several delays. A third film is planned to conclude an intended trilogy.

== Premise ==
Set during the winter after the flooding of Gotham City, the vigilante Bruce Wayne / Batman investigates another case that further explores the corruption and division within the city.

== Cast ==
- Robert Pattinson as Bruce Wayne / Batman:
  A reclusive billionaire who obsessively protects Gotham City as a masked vigilante to cope with his traumatic past. Director Matt Reeves said Bruce is entering a challenging new phase as he finds it "very hard to be Batman" because he now views things as more morally grey rather than black-and-white, and that he blames himself for the city's desperation in the aftermath of its flooding.
- Jeffrey Wright as Jim Gordon: An ally of Batman in the Gotham City Police Department (GCPD)
- Andy Serkis as Alfred Pennyworth: Batman's butler, mentor, and father figure. Serkis said Alfred and Batman remain "slightly at odds" but are closer.
- Colin Farrell as Oz Cobb / The Penguin: A disfigured crime boss who rose to power following the death of kingpin Carmine Falcone
- Sebastian Stan as Harvey Dent:
  Gotham's district attorney. Stan described portraying the character as having "many roles", indicating that this was due to his disfigured alter ego, Two-Face. Despite this, Stan has not confirmed his role, but called it ambitious and different from his earlier roles.
- Scarlett Johansson as Gilda Dent: Harvey's wife. Johansson found her role particularly difficult to figure out and said it gave her "existential angst".
- Charles Dance as Charles Dent: Harvey's abusive and alcoholic father

Supporting cast members returning from The Batman include Jayme Lawson as Bella Reál, the new mayor of Gotham City, and Gil Perez-Abraham as Martinez, a GCPD officer. Sebastian Koch and Brian Tyree Henry have also been cast in undisclosed roles. Barry Keoghan is also expected to reprise his role as the Joker, an enemy of Batman who is incarcerated in Arkham State Hospital. Other characters reported to appear include Batman's sidekick Robin, Doctor Arkham, and the serial killer Victor Zsasz, as well as the Court of Owls organization.

== Production ==
=== Development ===
==== Early work and announcement ====
"I had a lot of ideas, and then Mattson Tomlin, who's my writing partner, we began the process of this by doing another deep dive into the comics, exploring the ideas that I had had. He gave me some ideas that he had had. And we sat together and we watched a lot of movies, honestly, and not all movies that are from the realm of Gotham, just to explore where this story [goes]... because I knew that the way the [first] movie ended it was leaving us on the precipice, and also the way events sort of happen within the show [The Penguin], that there is an exploration to be had. And one of the explorations for me was to do something that pushes even further into the character of Bruce Wayne, because the first story is so much about the Batman. [...] I always wanted the movies to be focused on his character. Once you get past the origin tale, which we didn't quite do but we did something that referred to his origins, then you start telling the rogues' gallery story and that character's arc. And I never wanted to lose Rob [Pattinson] at the center of these stories. And so that is really what we set our aim on. And so picking the right villain that digs into what that does, that goes into his past and his life, that was what drove that discussion."

— Director Matt Reeves on determining the story and antagonist of Part II

Warner Bros. Pictures intended for the standalone DC Comics–based film The Batman (2022) to start a new trilogy of Batman films by May 2019. Some cast members were signed on for future installments by that November, including Colin Farrell, who was attached to portray the Penguin in three Batman films. By September 2021, The Batman co-writer and director Matt Reeves and his producing partner Dylan Clark had plans for that film to start its own shared universe focused on the character Batman, which they referred to as the "Batman Epic Crime Saga". This would remain separated from the concurrent DC Extended Universe (DCEU) franchise and its version of the character, portrayed by Ben Affleck. Reeves had suggested to studio executives during production of The Batman that a sequel could further explore the Penguin, but they instead wanted to use that idea for a spin-off television series, The Penguin (2024), which would set up a sequel. Leading up to The Batman's release, Clark said it would establish what potential sequels could expand upon, while Reeves and star Robert Pattinson expressed interest in a sequel introducing Batman's sidekick Robin and featuring supervillains such as the Court of Owls, Calendar Man, Mr. Freeze, or Hush.

In April 2022, Discovery, Inc. merged with WarnerMedia, the owner of DC and Warner Bros., to form Warner Bros. Discovery (WBD), led by president and CEO David Zaslav. The new company was expected to restructure DC Entertainment, and Zaslav began searching for an equivalent to Marvel Studios president Kevin Feige to lead the new subsidiary. A sequel to The Batman was announced to be in development at the Warner Bros. CinemaCon panel later that month, when Warner Bros. Pictures Group chairman Toby Emmerich said the "entire team" would return from the first film, including Reeves as writer and director and Pattinson as the star. Negotiations for Reeves's return had lasted longer than expected because a deal was not guaranteed under the new Warner Bros. Discovery leadership, but he signed his production company 6th & Idaho Productions to an overall film production deal with Warner Bros. Pictures in August that included his work on the sequel to The Batman. This deal was seen as a reassurance that the studio was committed to supporting filmmakers, following the shelving of the nearly completed DCEU film Batgirl. Clark and Mattson Tomlin, an uncredited writer on The Batman, returned to work with Reeves on the sequel as a producer and co-writer, respectively. Reeves and Tomlin wanted to elevate the sequel from the first film and were expected to start writing in the following weeks.

In October 2022, Reeves was meeting with writers and directors for several film and television series spin-offs from The Batman that were in early development alongside the sequel and centered on members of Batman's rogues gallery, such as Scarecrow, Clayface, and Professor Pyg. Later that month, writer and director James Gunn and producer Peter Safran, who had both worked on multiple DCEU projects, were hired to serve as the co-chairmen and co-CEOs of the new subsidiary DC Studios. They began overseeing all DC Comics adaptations moving forward, including Reeves's The Batman sequel, which was not expected to be released until 2025 at the earliest, while Reeves continued work on the script. In November, Zaslav said there would not be multiple versions of Batman moving forward, while Reeves, Gunn, and Safran subsequently discussed how they could avoid their plans from clashing. The latter two briefly considered integrating Pattinson's Batman into DC Studio's main franchise, the DC Universe (DCU), which Gunn initially denied, but they respected Reeves's decision to keep his plans separate from the DCU.

Reeves confirmed that he and Tomlin were writing the script by January 2023. At the end of that month, DC Studios announced that the sequel was titled The Batman – Part II and set a release date of October 3, 2025. It was set under the "DC Elseworlds" label, which is for projects that do not fit into the main DCU continuity. At the same time, a separate DCU Batman film was announced as The Brave and the Bold, which features a different version of Batman from Pattinson's portrayal. In February 2023, filming was scheduled to start that November at DC Studios's production hub at Warner Bros. Studios Leavesden in England, and Reeves confirmed that Andy Serkis would reprise his role as Alfred Pennyworth. By March, Clayface was reported to have a major role in the film, which Gunn later debunked; Reeves was subsequently attached to produce DC Studios projects for the "Crime Saga" and the DCU, including the DCU film Clayface (2026).

==== Extensive writing process and production delays ====
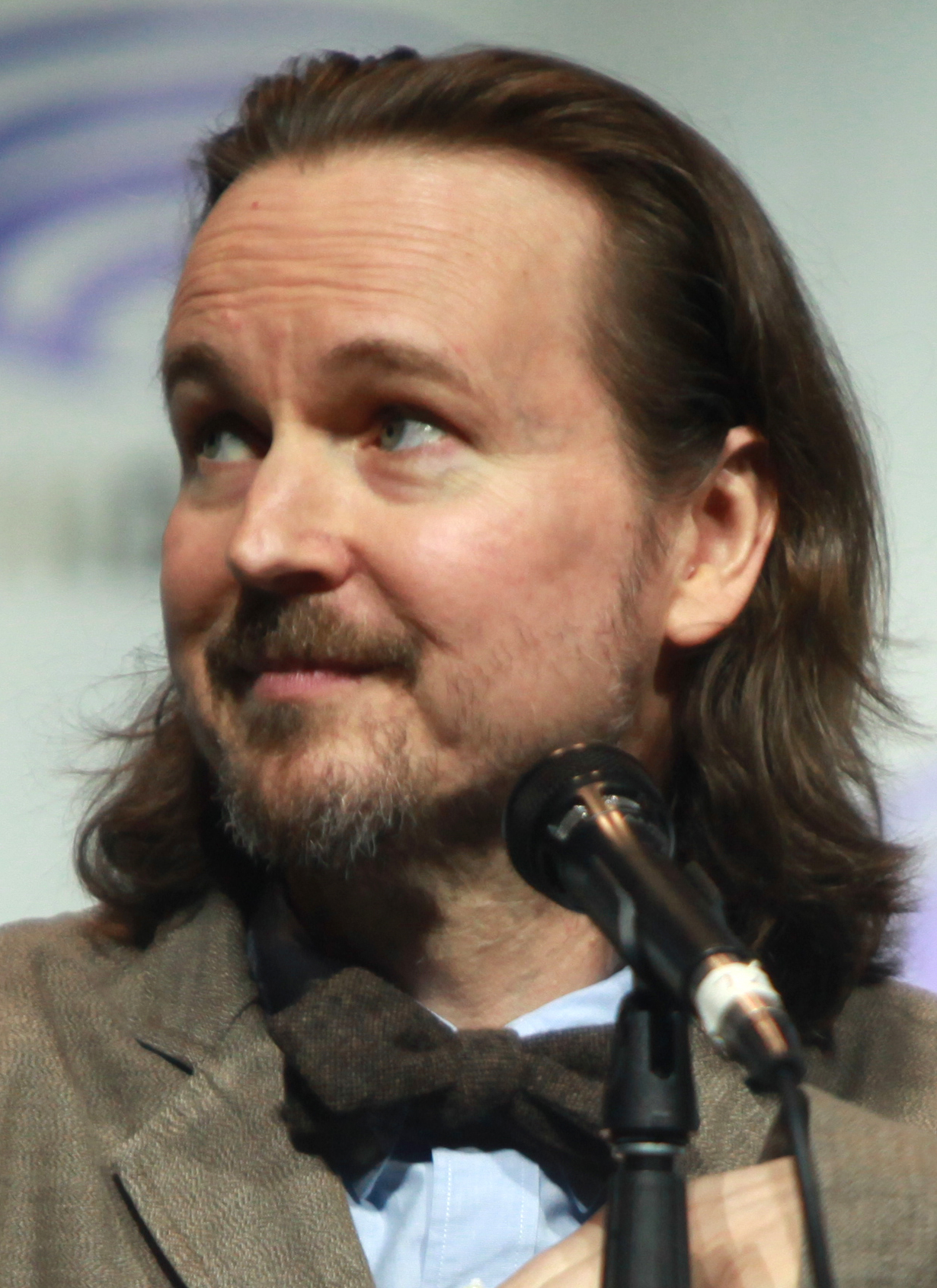
Director Matt Reeves was committed to meticulously perfecting the script, which contributed to multiple delays.

By June 2023, the start of filming was delayed until March 2024 due to the 2023 Writers Guild of America strike, but the release date was not expected to be affected. Reeves and The Batman cinematographer Greig Fraser had discussed working on the sequel, but pre-production was put on hold until the writers' strike ended in late September, when work was expected to resume imminently. Gunn heard a pitch for the film by December, and Reeves was expected to turn in a draft of the script by early February 2024, ahead of casting and a filming start scheduled between August and October 2024. In February 2024, Jeffrey Wright said he would reprise his role as Jim Gordon, after indicating that the character would be elevated from a Gotham City Police Department (GCPD) lieutenant. In March, the film's release date was delayed to October 2, 2026, due to the wider 2023 Hollywood labor disputes, which had caused several central sound stages intended for the production to be reserved through the end of 2024. Consequently, filming was not expected to begin until April 2025, but the delay gave Reeves more time to write. He confirmed in July that Farrell would return as the Penguin. Farrell initially said he would appear in five or six scenes, but later said he had only two.

Due to Reeves's meticulous filmmaking process, he was committed to perfecting the script, which he consequently described as being slow. He had shared parts of the script with DC Studios between the middle and end of 2024, but would not submit a first draft or full script until he believed it was ready. Reeves said the sequel would follow Batman investigating another case that further explores the corruption and division within Gotham City in the aftermath of its flooding. Part II occurs a few weeks after The Penguin. Reeves said he was finishing the script in September but was uncertain whether Fraser would return due to his busy schedule. Production was still expected to start in 2025. At the end of December 2024, the film's release date was delayed to October 1, 2027, to allow more time for writing the full script. The film was reportedly left untitled, but Reeves and DC Studios still referred to it as The Batman Part II. At that time, filming was expected to start in the third quarter of 2025 and rely heavily on visual effects. Zoë Kravitz was also indicated to be reprising her role as Catwoman, but she was later not expected to return. Following rumors that Pattinson's portrayal of Batman could be integrated into the DCU, Reeves stated in January 2025 that this was not planned and that he was focused on making Part II and his "Crime Saga", but was receptive to the idea if it was reasonable to do. Gunn stated that such an integration had not been seriously discussed and was unlikely to happen, and he did not expect Reeves's sequel to be released in the same calendar year as The Brave and the Bold. That film's director Andy Muschietti said DC Studios had a strategy to ensure that the two films did not conflict with each other.

By February 2025, filming for Part II was expected to start at the end of 2025, before it was pushed back in the following months until January or March 2026, scheduled after Pattinson's commitments to the 2026 films The Odyssey and Dune: Part Three. Reeves had submitted several pages of the script for over half a year by the middle of May, when the first full draft was reportedly expected to be delivered by the end of that month. The script was subsequently expected by late June, over a year after Gunn and Safran's original expectation. Gunn defended the delays, citing Reeves's meticulous writing process and the sufficient time provided, similar to The Batman. Gunn also debunked further rumors of the sequel being canceled and reaffirmed that Reeves's "Crime Saga" was important to DC Studios. Matthew Belloni at Puck reported that the film's delays had frustrated some executives, including Zaslav, yet he debunked rumors that the studio was prepared to "move on" from Reeves if he did not soon finish writing. Belloni noted that Reeves had been dealing with personal issues during the sequel's development, but that the film was still intended to make its release date, as long as production proceeded smoothly. Reeves and Tomlin announced that the script was completed at the end of June, when the film was titled The Batman: Part II. The script was submitted to DC Studios by the middle of July. Reeves soon explained that the production of Part II took longer than he wanted due to various factors, including personal reasons, and that he wanted to ensure the script had reached a point where he and Tomlin were proud of it. Because Reeves sought to keep the film's mystery plot secret, he sent the script to the cast and crew in a highly secure, locked pouch accessible only via a code.

=== Pre-production ===
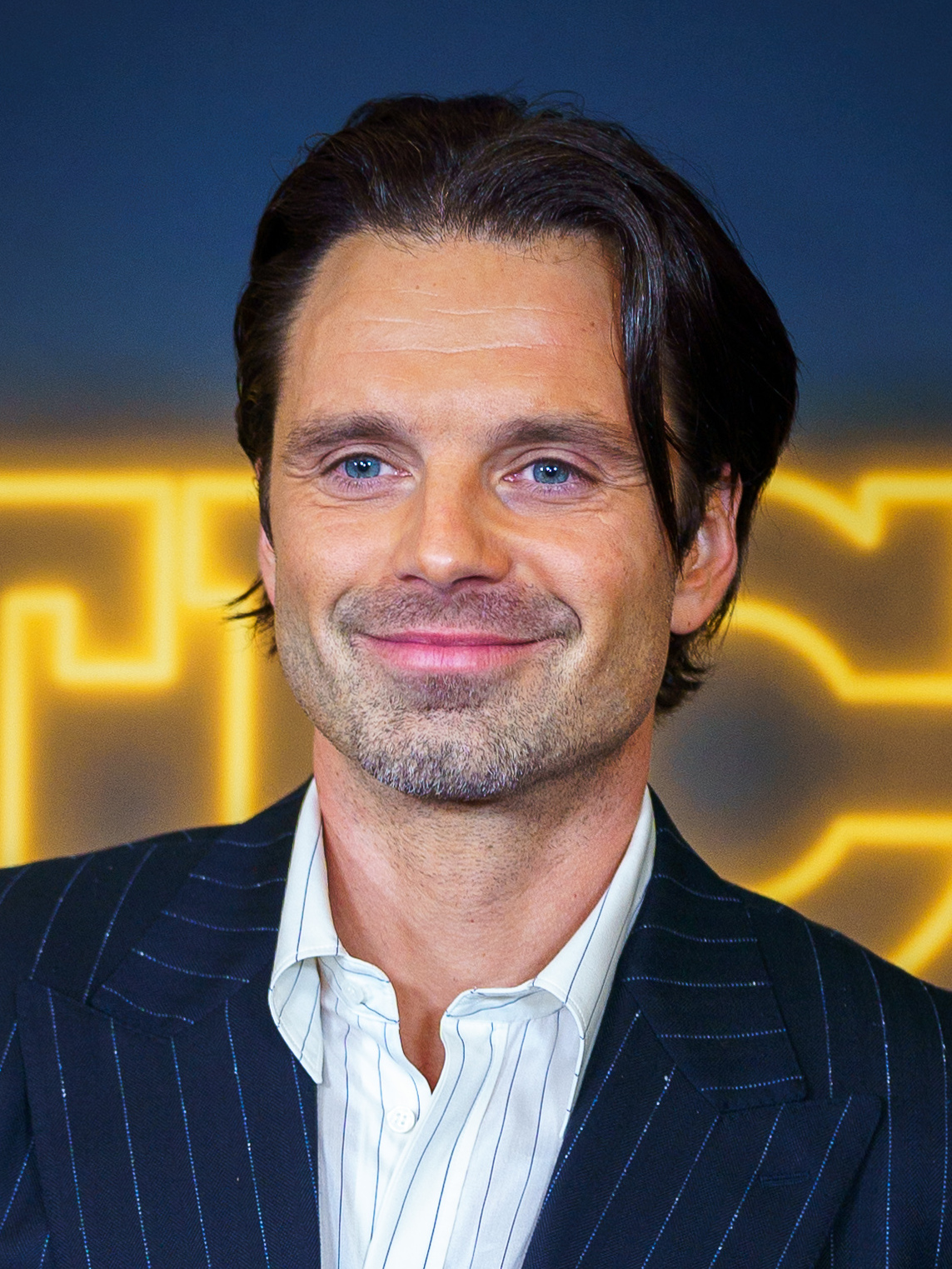
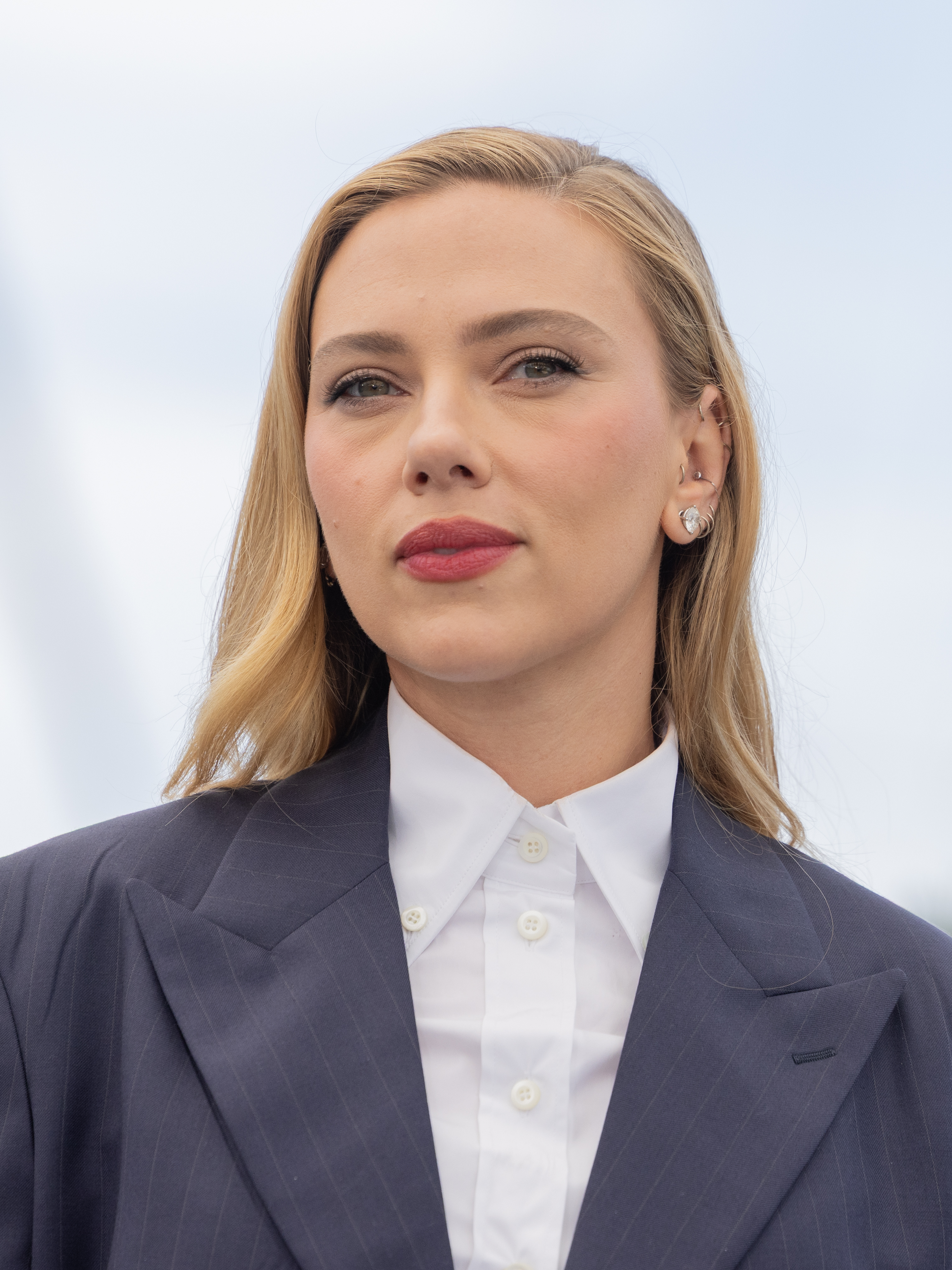
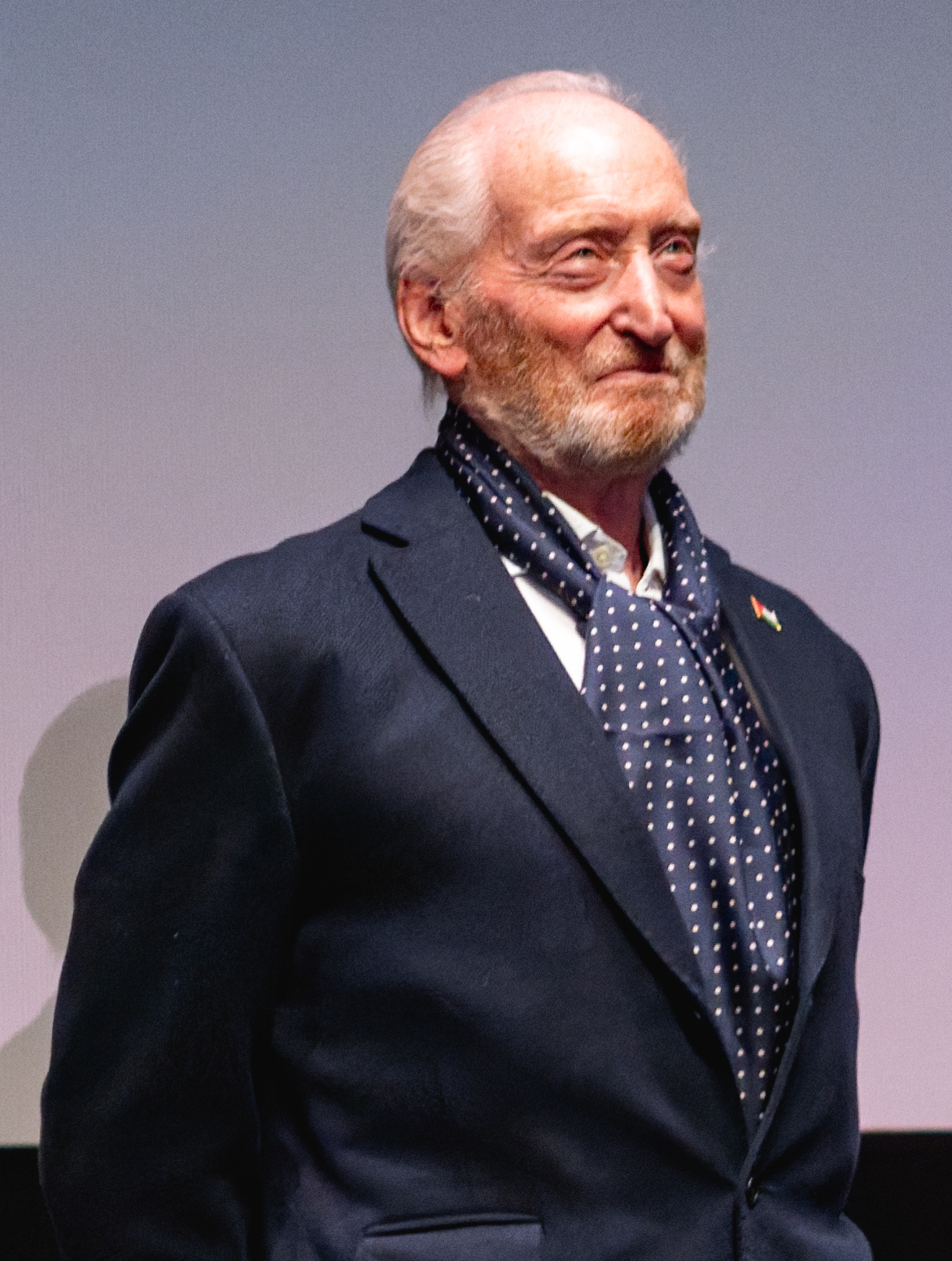
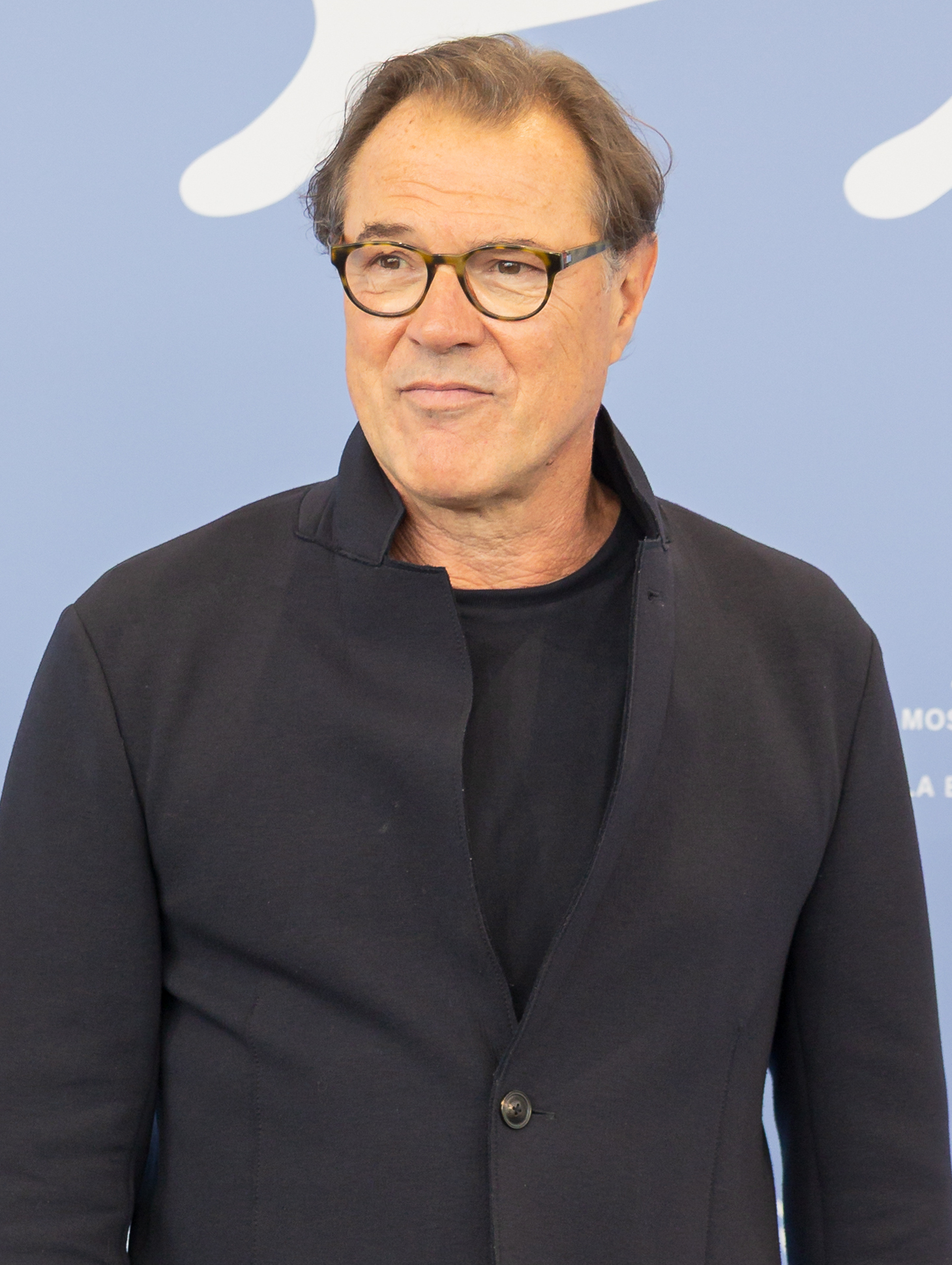
Sebastian Stan and Scarlett Johansson were the first new additions to the cast, portraying Harvey Dent and his wife, Gilda. Both joined after starring in the rivaling Marvel Cinematic Universe (MCU) franchise. Charles Dance and Sebastian Koch subsequently joined them in additional roles.

In August 2025, Warner Bros. Discovery announced the start of pre-production on The Batman: Part II, and that filming would commence within the first few months of 2026, while casting was scheduled to start in late 2025. Journalist Jeff Sneider reported that the character Robin was featured in the script, which Gunn denied. Reeves stated in September that he expected to start filming around the end of April or the beginning of May 2026. He added that while The Batman was focused on Batman's vigilante identity, Part II would center on his Bruce Wayne alter ego more than prior Batman films because of the mystery and detective story, for which Reeves decided to feature an antagonist that had not been used in previous live-action feature films. Production designer Luke Hull was hired at the end of October. He was location scouting by late November, particularly at Glasgow Cathedral and Anderston railway station in Glasgow, Scotland. Cinematographer Erik Messerschmidt, who previously shot an advertisement for the virtual reality game Batman: Arkham Shadow (2024), was hired in early December, after Fraser was unable to return due to his commitments to The Beatles – A Four-Film Cinematic Event (2028). Gunn and Safran were also attatched to produce the film for DC Studios, alongside Reeves's 6th & Idaho partner, Lynn Harris.

Scarlett Johansson entered final negotiations to join the cast in early December 2025. Due to her busy schedule, she first adjusted her earlier commitments to the film The Exorcist: Martyrs (2027) to accommodate the schedule for The Batman: Part II. The start of filming was pushed back to the end of May 2026. Johansson was reported to be portraying Gilda Gold, the wife of Harvey Dent, who was expected to be a love interest or an antagonist of Batman. Johansson had reportedly been looking for a darker role after portraying typically heroic characters—such as Natasha Romanoff / Black Widow in the rivaling Marvel Cinematic Universe (MCU) franchise from 2010 to 2021—and she began vigorously pursuing the part after Emma Stone declined an offer. Johansson had potentially agreed to a reduced salary upfront in exchange for back-end compensation based on the film's financial performance. Casting was underway for the major roles of Harvey Dent and his abusive and alcoholic father Christopher Dent, while the character Doctor Arkham was also reported to have a small role. Reeves had reportedly approached Brad Pitt to portray Harvey's father before a scheduling conflict arose with his commitments to the film The Riders. Sebastian Stan, who portrayed Bucky Barnes / Winter Soldier in the MCU alongside Johansson, entered negotiations to portray Harvey Dent in January 2026. Stan said he did not expect to join a DC film due to his long career in the MCU and jokingly approached Gunn about it around the same time that Reeves had watched the film The Apprentice (2024) and was impressed by Stan's performance in it. At this point, Barry Keoghan was expected to reprise his role as the Joker, after briefly appearing in The Batman.

Later in January 2026, Justin Kroll of Deadline Hollywood reported that the production had one major role left to cast, which was for an older character who was believed to be Harvey Dent's father. After several actors, including Stellan Skarsgård, had reportedly declined the role, Charles Dance entered negotiations in the middle of April to portray the character, who would instead be named Charles Dent. Kroll reported that Skarsgård was the only actor seriously considered for the role before Dance, while Johansson was reiterated to be portraying Harvey's wife. Serkis was also reaffirmed to be returning as Alfred, working around his commitments to directing and starring in his film The Lord of the Rings: The Hunt for Gollum (2027). He was expected to start shooting his scenes by the end of 2026, after filming The Hunt for Gollum. At that point, principal photography was scheduled to start in June, after it had been delayed by five months. Reeves started camera tests in May and confirmed the return of several cast members from The Batman, including Wright, Serkis, Farrell, Jayme Lawson as Mayor Bella Reál, and Gil Perez-Abraham as GCPD officer Martinez. He also announced the castings of Stan, Johansson, and Dance, along with Sebastian Koch and Brian Tyree Henry in undisclosed roles, the latter of whom briefly appeared in the standalone DC film Joker (2019). Sneider subsequently reported the following month that Stan was portraying the serial killer Victor Zsasz instead of Harvey Dent, whom he stated Henry would portray. He also reported that the Court of Owls would appear and that Johansson and Dance's roles were composite interpretations of lesser-known Batman characters associated with that organization, indicating they were not members of the Dent family. TheWrap reported in August that Stan had not confirmed he was portraying Harvey Dent and that he had been misquoted when interviewed about the film. Stan described keeping his role a secret as "one of the most challenging situations" for him because of the speculation surrounding it. Judah Carroll at Men's Journal stated that "suspicion [was] beginning to build that Stan is not playing the role fans are being led to believe", adding that this would not be the first time that Reeves had intentionally misled fans about a role, after doing so for Keoghan's role in The Batman.

=== Filming ===
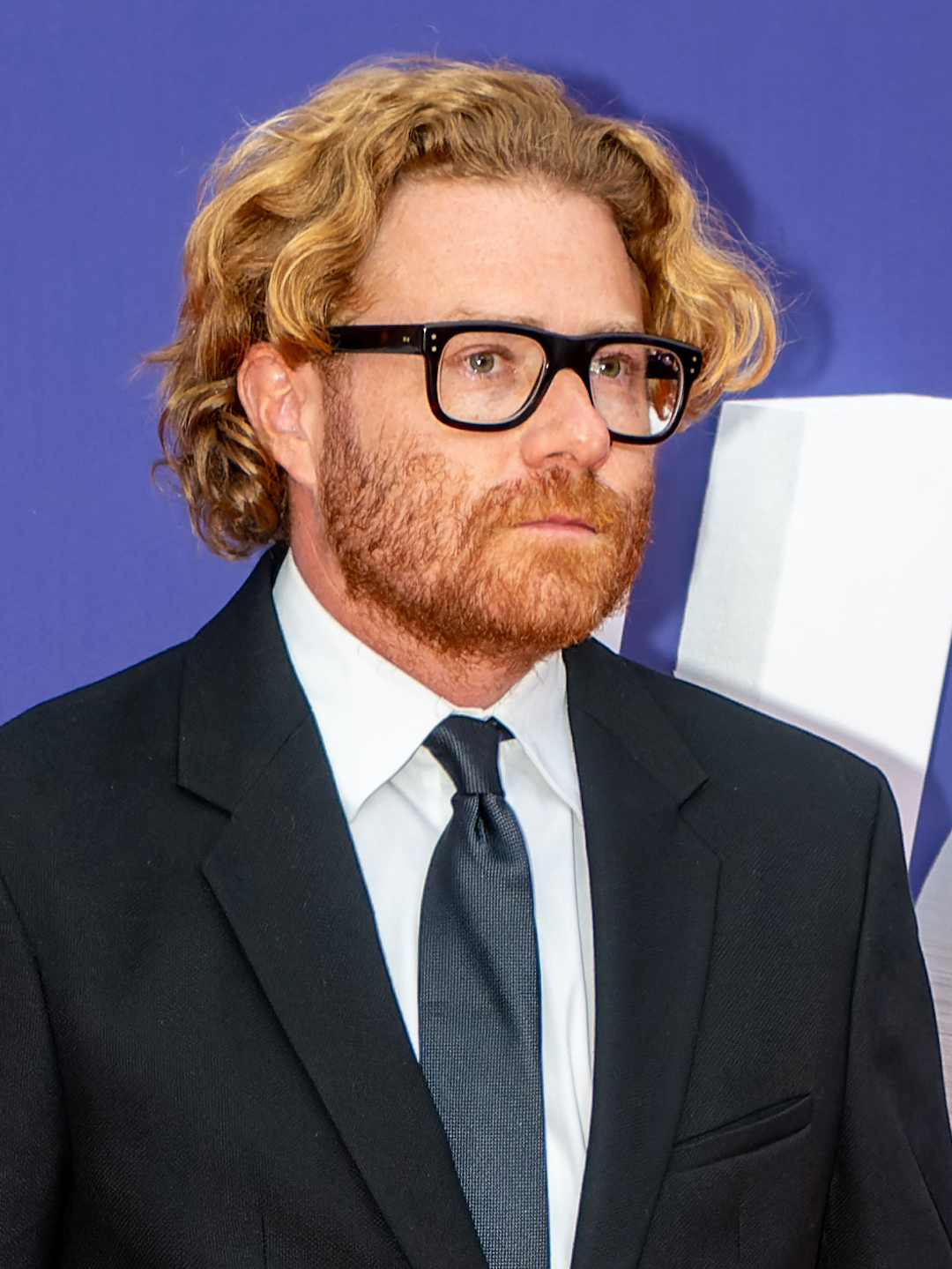
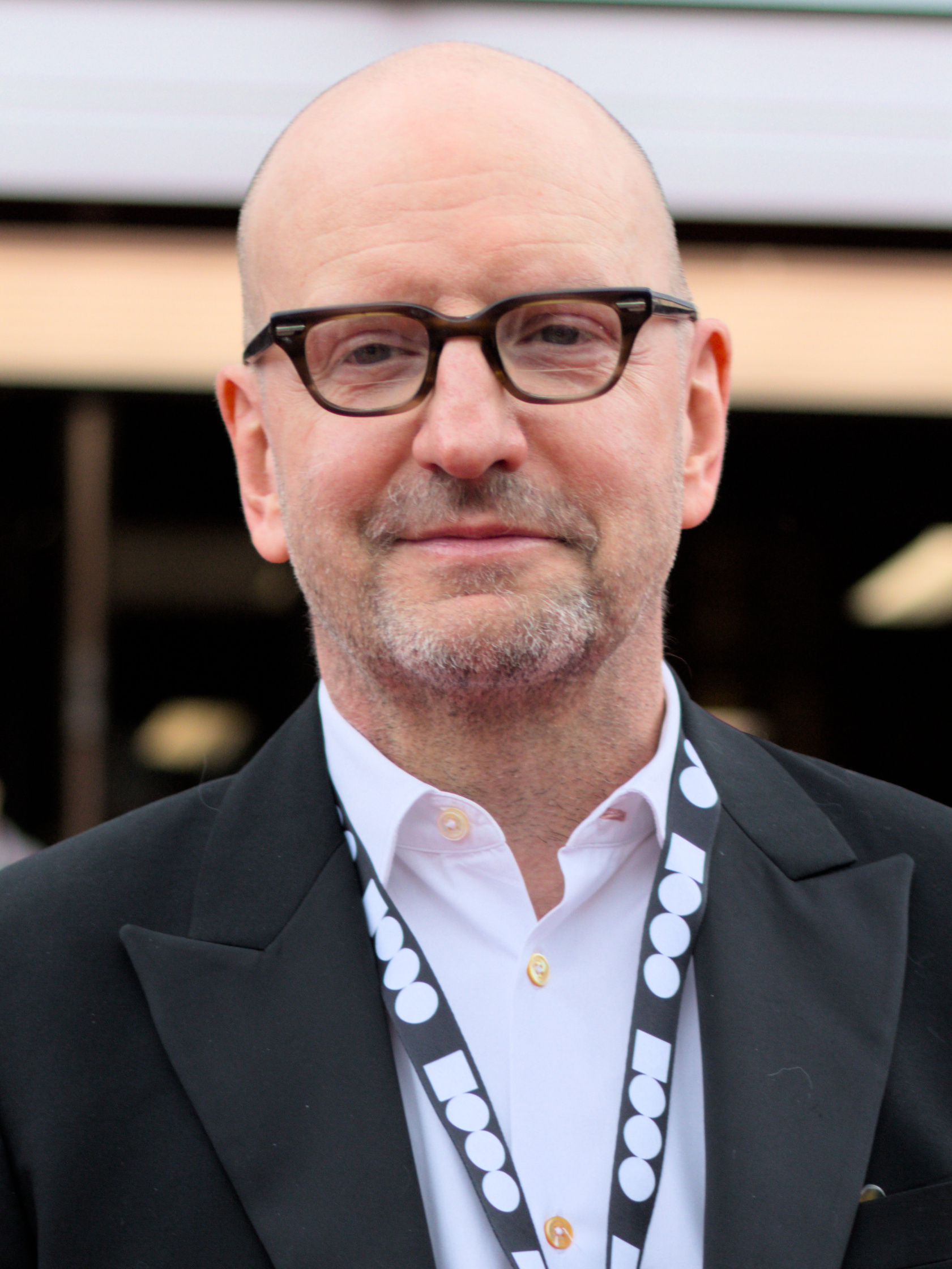
Cinematographer Erik Messerschmidt took over from Greig Fraser after he could not return due to scheduling conflicts, while filmmaker Steven Soderbergh approached Reeves to help direct the remainder of principal photography while he focused on a personal family matter.

Second unit filming and a technical recce took place at the old Birkenhead Tunnel and St George's Hall, Liverpool, starting on May 20, 2026, featuring vehicles with GCPD decals and yellow taxi cabs. Principal photography commenced on June 12, following multiple delays while Reeves meticulously worked on the script. Filming is primarily taking place on sound stages at Warner Bros. Studios Leavesden, with cinematographer Erik Messerschmidt, while exterior location shooting occurs throughout London and Liverpool, England, as well as in Glasgow, Scotland. The production uses the working title Semper Vigilans, which was believed to be a reference to the Court of Owls. Eleven weeks of filming were scheduled to take place at night. Farrell was set to film his scenes during the first two weeks in July.

In the middle of July, the release date was further delayed to February 18, 2028, to allow more time for the post-production process. Filming took place around the old Birkenhead Tunnel and within the Liverpool City Region during the week of July 20, before shooting on the Silver Jubilee Bridge in Runcorn, Cheshire. Three weeks of filming commenced on August 18 in the Glasgow city centre, taking place at the Broomielaw, the Glasgow Bridge, the Kingston Bridge, North Street, and the National Cycle Route 75 along the River Clyde. 23 bridge pillar murals painted through the arts venue SWG3 and funded by the Glasgow City Council were covered for filming, with the production expected to coordinate with SWG3 and cover the costs for their reinstatement after filming concluded In September, filming took place at St Paul's Cathedral to stand in for the Gotham Bar Association and street protest scenes, and at the Bank tube station for the Gotham Transit Authority.

In early October, Warner Bros. and DC Studios announced that filming had been temporarily halted while Reeves stepped away from on-set physical production to focus on a personal family matter. Filmmaker Steven Soderbergh, who admired Reeves's work on The Batman, subsequently approached Reeves about helping him complete work on the film, and he was hired later that month to direct the remaining weeks of principal photography. The pair would closely collaborate to ensure Soderbergh's new footage could be seamlessly integrated with the previously filmed material. Reeves was expected to oversee post-production once he was ready. Second unit filming had continued by that point, and filming was set to take place the following week at Central Hall Westminster near Parliament Square in London. In November, Serkis said that he would start filming his scenes after Christmas, with filming extended into early 2027, due to the continued production delays.

== Music ==
Reeves confirmed in July 2026 that he intended for Michael Giacchino to return from The Batman to compose the score for Part II.

== Marketing ==
On May 7, 2026, Reeves released two camera test photos featuring the Batmobile in winter conditions. Casey Loving at TheWrap highlighted the change in setting from The Batman, which he likened to the Christmas setting of Batman Returns (1992), and noted the Batmobile's design upgrades. Reeves engaged with fans responding to the photos and reposted Tony S. Daniel and Tomeu Morey's cover art for the "Beasts of Burden" storyline from Batman vol. 3 #57, depicting Batman trekking through snow and covered in blood. That storyline features the KGBeast and the apparent death of Batman's sidekick, Dick Grayson. The winter setting and comic art led to speculation that the characters Mr. Freeze and Robin could appear. Kennedy French of Variety stated that while the context of the test photos "remain[ed] murky", they made it "clear that the long-gestating sequel is finally moving [forward]". Over the course of two days later that month, Reeves announced the cast members through various social media posts, featuring GIFs of the returning actors from The Batman and of the new cast using footage from some of their earlier film appearances. The social media rollout drew comparisons to the similarly hours-long cast announcement livestream for the MCU film Avengers: Doomsday (2026), though William Goodman at GQ felt it was "less arduous". Nick Romano at Entertainment Weekly noted that the use of GIFs was a "very Reeves move, coming with individually wrapped notes for each star". Justin Carter at Gizmodo felt Reeves's "more down-to-earth approach" allowed him to directly communicate with fans while alleviating concerns about the film's long development. Consequence's Ben Kaye speculated that Reeves's GIF choices indicated which roles the actors were portraying. When the delayed February 2028 release date was announced in July, Reeves released a camera test video with a first look at Pattinson in the film's Batsuit. Loving again highlighted the winter aesthetics.

== Release ==
The Batman: Part II is scheduled to be theatrically released by Warner Bros. Pictures in the United States on February 18, 2028, in IMAX, as part of the "DC Elseworlds" label. The film was originally scheduled for release on October 3, 2025, but was delayed multiple times. After an initial delay to October 2, 2026, due to the 2023 Hollywood strikes, it was further shifted to October 1, 2027, to allow more time for writing, before settling on the February 2028 date to allocate additional time during post-production.

== Future ==
In September 2024, Reeves reiterated his earlier plans to develop a The Batman film trilogy. After Pattinson was cast as James Bond for the film Bond 26 (2028) in November 2026, TheWrap reported that Part II's prolonged production had allowed him to exit early from his contract, which committed him to a third and final The Batman film. This would allow Pattinson to commit to three Bond films that he was reportedly obligated to. Writing for The Hollywood Reporter, James Hibberd reported that some industry observers were skeptical about a third The Batman film eventuating due to Part II's extensive schedule and depending on Pattinson's involvement, while others believed Pattinson could still work around his Bond commitments because his frequently busy schedule was often divided between independent arthouse films and major studio tentpoles. Hibberd noted that some commentators expected then-incoming DC Studios president Jeremy Latcham to prioritize casting a different actor for the DCU version who could be available for further standalone films and crossovers, rather than integrating Pattinson's portrayal. Hibberd concluded that Pattinson was unlikely to simultaneously portray both title roles. Converely, Ben Child at The Guardian believed Pattinson could continue playing Batman alongside Bond and compared this to Harrison Ford concurrently portraying Han Solo in the Star Wars films (1977–2019) and the title role in the Indiana Jones film series (1981–2023). However, while Child noted that the character had been reinvented by numerous directors with their own vision over the years while remaining largely standalone, he opined that Skydance and Latcham could determine that maintaining a Batman portrayal separate from their attempts to rapidly expand the DC shared universe would be an "unnecessary complication" because some believed the character's grounded and gritty approach made him "apparently incompatible" with the wider franchise. He questioned whether integrating Pattinson's Batman into the DCU would "risk puncturing the film's carefully constructed atmosphere". Child concluded, "It would be ironic if Warner Bros ended up sacrificing one of its few genuinely distinctive superhero franchises just as the wider DC universe was beginning to find its feet."
