= Batman: The Last Arkham =

1992 DC Comics storyline

"The Last Arkham"
- Cover of Batman: The Last Arkham trade paperback, art by Brian Stelfreeze
- Publisher: DC Comics
- Publication date: June – September 1992
- Genre: Superhero
- Title(s): Batman: Shadow of the Bat #1-4
- Main character(s): Batman; Victor Zsasz; Jeremiah Arkham

Creative team
- Writer: Alan Grant
- Artist: Norm Breyfogle
- Letterer: Todd Klein
- Colorist: Adrienne Roy
- Editor: Bob Kahan
- Batman: The Last Arkham: ISBN 1-56389-190-5

"The Last Arkham" is a four-part Batman story arc that started the Batman: Shadow of the Bat comic book series in mid-1992. The storyline began in Batman: Shadow of the Bat #1 (June 1992), and finished in Batman: Shadow of the Bat #4 (Sept. 1992). DC Comics later compiled the four issues into a trade paperback in 1995. The comic was written by Alan Grant and drawn by Norm Breyfogle and was responsible for the introduction of several new characters into the Batman universe.

== Plot ==
"The Last Arkham" begins with the destruction of the old Arkham Asylum at the hands of its new administrator, Jeremiah Arkham, who inherited it from his deceased uncle, Amadeus Arkham. The asylum is revamped and fitted with numerous new security measures.

When Batman stumbles upon a series of murders, resembling the serial killer Victor Zsasz's MO, Batman begins to investigate only to find Zsasz has been imprisoned in Arkham Asylum during the course of the murders. Determined to prove Zsasz guilty, Batman and Commissioner Gordon stage Batman's insanity in order to get him committed to Arkham and further investigate. However, Jeremiah Arkham is unaware of this plot and begins to break down Batman mentally and physically. Learning of Batman's incarceration through private talk with Jeremiah, Zsasz guesses Batman's insanity is obviously a ploy and begins to plant seeds of hatred towards Batman in Jeremiah's mind. This explodes when Jeremiah forces Batman to fight Amygdala and other inmates from the asylum, including the Joker, the Mad Hatter, and Egghead.

Whilst this continues, Zsasz escapes through the tunnels which he had purchased and kills the builder and another inmate in order to cover his tracks. Batman defeats all the inmates and begins to wonder about Jeremiah Arkham's sanity, as Amadeus Arkham was in fact the asylum's first inmate. Batman is put back into holding, but is freed by Nightwing, who had come to investigate. The pair split up and Nightwing encounters Zsasz in the tunnels below the building. Zsasz collapses the tunnel in on Nightwing, but is stopped by Batman who had made the agonizing journey through a microwave sensor to stop him. The pair fight in the sewer and Commissioner Gordon arrives in time to arrest Zsasz.

== Character introductions ==
"The Last Arkham" launched three new characters into the Batman universe; Victor Zsasz, Jeremiah Arkham, and Amygdala, who were reunited in a story arc during the "Knightfall" story arc.

Zsasz was originally created by Alan Grant and was named after psychiatrist Thomas Szasz when Grant saw the name while visiting his girlfriend in her university library. Despite getting complaints that the character was similar to Hannibal Lecter, Grant thought that Zsasz and Arkham Asylum would be able to start off a successful comic book series.

Alan Grant drew Jeremiah Arkham's personality from another book from his girlfriend's library; the biology book Superstition in the Common Pigeon by B. F. Skinner. Throughout the comic book, Jeremiah Arkham states that "if you change the behavior, the mind will follow". This line was drawn from that book and gives light to Jeremiah's sadistic methods of dealing with the inmates. In the Last Arkham, Jeremiah's background is touched upon during a flashback and explains that his understanding of the human mind comes from one instance when he was 16 and a store was being held up by a maniac from Arkham Asylum. Jeremiah coolly calms the gunman when he goes to shoot him, and watches him take his own life.

== In other media ==
=== Television ===
"The Last Arkham" is adapted in the Batman: The Animated Series episode "Dreams in Darkness" with the substitutions of Scarecrow for Victor Zsasz and Dr. Bartholomew for Jeremiah Arkham..

=== Video games ===
"The Last Arkham"'s core premise heavily influenced the Batman: Arkham Asylum and Batman: Arkham Knight games.

== Collected editions ==
The storyline has been collected into a trade paperback:

- Batman: The Last Arkham (DC Comics, October 1995, ISBN 1-56389-190-5; also published in the U.K. by Titan Books, 1996, ISBN 1-85286-665-9)
- Batman: Shadow of the Bat Volume 1 (DC Comics, June 2016, ISBN 1-40126319-4)
