= Jeremiah Arkham =

DC Comics supervillain

Publication information
- Publisher: DC Comics
- First appearance: Batman: Shadow of the Bat #1 (June, 1992)
- Created by: Alan Grant; Norm Breyfogle

In-story information
- Species: Human
- Place of origin: Gotham City
- Notable aliases: Black Mask

Jeremiah Arkham is a supervillain and the head of the Arkham Asylum in DC Comics, created by Alan Grant. Arkham was created in 1992, and slowly "lost his mind" during his time in the Arkham Asylum, the fictional psychiatric hospital for the criminally insane, subsequently becoming the second Black Mask. Though described as a sadist, Arkham seems to believe his intentions are for the benefit of his patients.

== Publication history ==
Jeremiah Arkham was created by Alan Grant and Norm Breyfogle and first appeared in Batman: Shadow of the Bat #1 in 1992. In the issue, Arkham is shown to believe he can convince Batman to willingly reveal his identity to him. Over time, Arkham went from being depicted as a compassionate doctor who believed he could cure any patient to an "obsessed manic wreck".

== Fictional character biography ==
Shadow of the Bat is the first appearance of Jeremiah. In the story, a contractor releases Victor Zsasz, enabling Zsasz's murder spree shortly after. When Batman discovers the bodies, he recognizes Zsasz's killing pattern, although it was known that Zsasz was in Arkham Asylum. Eventually, Batman finds the contractor who let Zsasz escape and captures him. When Jeremiah discovers Batman had not only feigned insanity but also stopped Zsasz's 'exposure therapy', he is enraged and releases patients on Batman, most notably Amygdala (who Jeremiah was manipulating) and Riddler.

In Knightfall, Bane breaks into Arkham Asylum and frees the inmates as Joker holds Jeremiah at gunpoint. Joker drives Jeremiah to near insanity until Batman saves him.

In Batman: No Man's Land, Jeremiah heads to the ruins of Arkham and finds his late uncle Amadeus' journal. Jeremiah decides to rebuild Arkham Asylum in his uncle's image. While the asylum is finishing renovations, workplace accidents begin to pile up, including Killer Croc's tank filtration rupturing, Mr. Freeze's room increasing in temperature, and Raggedy Man being freed. Later on, Alyce Sinner is shown to be having sexual relations with Black Mask (Roman Sionis). Alyce returns to the asylum and projects Amadeus Arkham's voice to incite a riot with the inmates. After Batman returns the inmates to their cells, Raggedy Man is found dead, which upsets Jeremiah deeply. Later, it is revealed that this is part of Black Mask's plan to defeat Jeremiah. Jeremiah is imprisoned and it is revealed that his personal patients like Hamburger Lady and No Face were all figments of his imaginations.

In "Battle for the Cowl", Jeremiah Arkham is causing mass-destruction in Gotham, culminating in him destroying Arkham Asylum. This is his first appearance as Black Mask as it activated after hearing of Batman's death and threatened escapees with acidic nanites of Blackgate Penitentiary to join him as he raised chaos in Gotham. His scheme of forming a new False Face Society did not last after Firefly found out about the nanites and burned them out, forcing Black Mask to flee.

In 2016, DC Comics implemented a relaunch of its books called "DC Rebirth", which restored its continuity to a form much as it was prior to "The New 52". Jeremiah at one point had sexual relations with Dr. Ingrid Karlsson who gave birth to their child. Karlsson later died during a riot in Arkham Asylum. To keep his daughter Astrid Arkham safe, Jeremiah raised her within the walls of Arkham Asylum, where she developed a hatred for Batman. This resulted in Astrid becoming the Arkham Knight.

== In other media ==
=== Television ===
Jeremiah Arkham appears in the Batwoman episode "We're All Mad Here", portrayed by Glen Ferguson. This version is a member of Black Glove. He and the other members of Black Glove are kidnapped by Marquis Jet, who kills Arkham offscreen.

=== Video games ===
- Jeremiah Arkham appears in Batman: Dark Tomorrow, voiced by Ron McLarty.
- Jeremiah Arkham appears in Lego Batman: The Videogame.
