= Batman: No Man's Land =

American comic book crossover storyline

- Cover of Batman: No Man's Land #1 (March 1999). Art by Alex Ross.
- Publisher: DC Comics
- Publication date: January – December 1999
- Genre: Superhero; Crossover
Title(s)
Azrael: Agent of the Bat #47-61
Batman #560-574
Batman: Harley Quinn
Batman: Legends of the Dark Knight #116-126
Batman: No Man's Land #1-0
Batman: No Man's Land Secret Files and Origins #1
Batman: Day of Judgment #1
Batman: Shadow of the Bat #80-94
The Batman Chronicles #16-18
Catwoman (vol. 2) #72-77
Detective Comics #727-741
JLA #32
Nightwing #35-39
Nightwing Secret Files and Origins #1
Robin (vol. 4) #67-73
Young Justice In No Man's Land #1
- Main character(s): Batman; Nightwing; Robin; Oracle; Batgirl; Huntress

Creative team
- Writer(s): Jordan B. Gorfinkel; Greg Rucka; Chuck Dixon; Scott Beatty; Paul Dini; Bob Gale; Devin K. Grayson; Kelley Puckett; Larry Hama; Bronwyn Carlton
- Penciller(s): Greg Land; Andy Kuhn; Yvel Guichet; Alex Maleev; Dale Eaglesham; Frank Teran; Phil Winslade; Damion Scott; Dan Jurgens; Mike Deodato; Tom Morgan; Mat Broome; Sergio Cariello
- Inker(s): Drew Geraci; Chris Ivy; Aaron Sowd; Wayne Faucher; Sean Parsons; Frank Teran; Phil Winslade; Sal Buscema; John Floyd; Bill Sienkiewicz; Sean Parsons; David Roach; Mark Pennington; Rob Hunter
- Volume One: ISBN 1-56389-564-1
- Volume Two: ISBN 1563895994
- Volume Three: ISBN 1563896346
- Volume Four: ISBN 1563896982
- Volume Five: ISBN 1563897091

"Batman: No Man's Land" is an American comic book crossover storyline that ran for almost all of 1999 through the Batman comic book titles published by DC Comics. The story architecture for "No Man's Land" and the outline of all the Batman continuity titles for 1999 were written by cartoonist Jordan B. Gorfinkel.

The lead-up story began with the Cataclysm story arc, which described a major earthquake hitting Gotham City. This was followed by the storylines Aftershock and then Road to No Man's Land, which resulted in the U.S. government officially evacuating Gotham and then abandoning and isolating those who chose to remain in the city. "No Man's Land" covered, in detail, a period in the lives of the residents of the city, explaining all events from the time of isolation, until its time of re-opening and the beginning of rebuilding.

== Publication history ==
The main storyline ran through the monthly Batman titles Detective Comics, Batman, Batman: Shadow of the Bat, and Batman: Legends of the Dark Knight with other spin-offs serving as tie-ins. In all, "No Man's Land" encompassed 80 regular monthly issues, four specials, and the Batman: Harley Quinn graphic novel.

The storyline is divided into several arcs. A part of the story would continue from one Batman title and then to the next Batman title that would come the following week, much like the same format that was being used in the Superman comics at that time. Unlike the Superman comics, where a creative team is maintained for one monthly title, the same creative team is maintained for the duration of the story arc.

The core storyline was originally collected as trade paperbacks in five volumes. However, because of the large number of issues that were devoted to "No Man's Land", only 40 of them made it into the original collections. DC has since released a new collection of "No Man's Land" volumes that includes issues previously uncollected.

A novelization of the story line was also written by Greg Rucka and released in hardcover in January 2000.

== Plot ==
Gotham City suffers the results of a magnitude 7.6 earthquake in the Cataclysm storyline. In response, the US government evacuates most of the civilian population, then declares Gotham a "no man's land", destroys all bridges leading to the island, and sets up a military blockade to prevent people from entering or exiting. Gangs and various supervillains Batman had battled over the years swiftly carve up the city. The city's police's commissioner, James Gordon, and several members of his department, who dub their gang the Blue Boys, stay behind to protect civilians. Oracle and Huntress also end up on the inside. Bruce Wayne leaves the city to lobby the government to continue aid to Gotham, but fails. Gordon and his men wait for Batman's return, but he disappears for months, leading the police to believe that he has abandoned Gotham. A bitterly disappointed Gordon denounces Batman and refuses to even speak his name. Huntress attempts to keep order, fashioning a Batgirl costume. She soon discovers that criminals fear her more as Batgirl than they do as Huntress and succeeds in holding territory of her own.

As Penguin continues his trading operation, Joker takes control of an area of Gotham City and dubs it "Jokerville." Commissioner Gordon and three police officers enter the Street Demonz territory to deface their logo with the Lo Boyz logo, only to be caught leaving by three Street Demonz members.

Before the Street Demonz can kill Commissioner Gordon and the police officers with him, they are saved by SWAT Lieutenant William "Billy" Pettit. On Day 98, Oracle chronicles the gang war between the Street Demonz and the Lo Boyz. Batman returns and rescues Alfred Pennyworth from some thugs. One of them falls into the river and sets off some mines. On Day 102, the Blue Boys managed to take over the Street Demonz' territory. Batman finds Huntress operating as Batgirl and allows her to continue to use the costume.

Batman and Alfred activate satellite Batcaves to begin actions to protect the city. Then he takes over Ventriloquist's territory and drives him and Scarface away after briefly holding him captive. Then he tells Rhino and the rest of Ventriloquist's gang that they work for him now.

When Huntress fails to hold off Two-Face and his army of men and loses Batman's territory, she abandons the Batgirl costume.

Batman and the police work separately to reclaim Gotham, piece by piece, by battling and subduing the gang leaders and then marking the reclaimed territory with graffiti. However, a schism erupts between Gordon and Lt. Pettit, whose militaristic, take-no-prisoners methods shock and outrage Gordon; the Blue Boys subsequently break into two separate factions, with most of Pettit's officers siding with him to form the Strong Men.

Poison Ivy takes up residence in Robinson Park, and Batman — after helping her defeat Clayface's attempts to control the park and thus Gotham's fresh fruit supply — allows her to remain there as long as she cares for various orphans who had retreated to the park, as well as distributing food to the rest of the city. Victor Zsasz claimed a territory in Gotham City as he contends with Leslie Thompkins. Mr. Freeze did the same thing where he even competed against Gearhead, whose armless and legless body was being carried around by the thuggish Tommy Mangles. Superman briefly visits the city to restore some degree of order, but quickly realizes that the city's current state of anarchy and 'might-makes-right' requires a greater effort than the 'quick-fix' he had been expecting and departs. He later returns as Clark Kent to visit Batman and advise locals on how to improve their burgeoning agriculture.

A simultaneous story in JLA reveals that the Justice League keeps an eye on Gotham during this time by preventing various villains from claiming the territory for themselves. Robin's father, Jack, discovers that his son is in Gotham, and believing Tim entered the city for some sort of dare, petitions the government for a search and rescue for Tim, which inadvertently attracts media attention and further public support for the city's revival.

Gordon briefly allies himself with Two-Face to reclaim vital territory, but Two-Face betrays the alliance to claim a greater amount of land for himself. Two-Face also hires David Cain to kill Gordon, but his mute daughter Cassandra, who has become one of Oracle's agents, thwarts Cain. Cassandra later becomes the second Batgirl to help clean up No Man's Land. Later, Two-Face kidnaps Gordon and puts him on trial for breaking the alliance. Police officer Renee Montoya reaches out to Two-Face's Harvey Dent persona, whose defense leads to Gordon's acquittal. While cross-examining himself, Dent concludes that Two-Face had essentially blackmailed Gordon into the alliance; hence, any agreement between them is null and void.

Gordon is tending to the garden at his apartment when Batman comes to visit. Gordon vents about the many frustrations of working with Batman, who had at first disappeared and left Gordon to fight alone. To regain his trust, Batman removes his cowl, only to find Gordon has turned away, insisting that he put the mask back on. Thus, Batman and Gordon make amends.

Through the efforts of Lucius Fox, Batman succeeds in getting the attention of Lex Luthor, who arrives in Gotham with plans to completely rebuild the city. Attempts by the Joker to disrupt construction are thwarted by Bane, who has been hired by Luthor in exchange for his own private country. Bane, who has been causing trouble in No Man's Land before, is looking to get revenge on Batman, who convinces him to leave and claim his payment before Luthor reneges on their deal.

Bowing to intense pressure from the people and the media, the government reverses the No Man's Land order and allows Gotham to rejoin the United States. Gordon and his surviving officers are promoted. On Christmas Day, Joker attacks Pettit's compound. Pettit is killed and the Huntress barely survives a battle with the Joker's men.

The Joker later kidnaps all of Gotham's babies, hiding them in the police station. When Sarah Essen Gordon stumbles upon the scene, the Joker shoots her in the head as she scrambles to catch a baby he dropped. Incredibly, the Joker finds no humor in Sarah's death and stoically surrenders to the police. Batman convinces a grief-stricken Gordon to refrain from killing the Joker, in order to prove that their city can still maintain its morale. When the Joker, who in the course of the Post-Crisis narrative has harmed Gordon's entire family, mockingly asks Gordon if he has a son, Gordon shoots the Joker through the kneecap instead; the Joker laments that he may never walk again, but then laughs hysterically upon realizing that he did the same thing to Gordon's daughter Barbara. Gordon then breaks down as Batman comforts him.

Luthor's philanthropy is revealed to be a cover for his true intentions: to destroy the deeds to much of the property in Gotham and claim it for himself under false names. Lucius Fox, acting on a tip, discovers copies of the original documents and notifies Luthor. Luthor, feigning ignorance, attempts to kill Fox, but Batman intervenes and reveals that he is the one who anonymously tipped the Wayne Enterprises' CEO. He tells Luthor that Gotham is not for sale and warns him to leave while he still can.

The story ends with the citizens of Gotham ringing in the New Year and fireworks exploded, while Gordon says his last goodbyes to his wife. Batman, placing roses at his parents' grave, prepares to spend another year as Gotham City's protector.

== Issues ==
The story ran through the following issues:

- Azrael: Agent of the Bat #50-61
- Batman #563-574
- Batman: Harley Quinn (graphic novel)
- The Batman Chronicles #16-18
- Batman: Day of Judgment (also part of Day of Judgment)
- Batman: Legends of the Dark Knight #116-126
- Batman: No Man's Land #1-0
- Batman: No Man's Land Secret Files and Origins #1
- Batman: Shadow of the Bat #83-94
- Catwoman #72-77
- Detective Comics #730-741
- Nightwing #35-39
- Robin #67-73
- Young Justice in No Man's Land #1

== New Gotham ==
Two of the storylines immediately following "No Man's Land" were collected as trade paperbacks with the subtitles New Gotham 1 and New Gotham 2, respectively, playing up the fact that they were set in the rebuilt Gotham City following "No Man's Land". These were Batman: Evolution from Detective Comics #743-750 and Batman: Officer Down, collecting the story from Batman #587, Robin #86, Birds of Prey #27, Catwoman #90, Nightwing #53, Detective Comics #754, and Gotham Knights #13.

== Collected editions ==
Of the 80 issues under the "No Man's Land" banner, 40 were collected into trade paperbacks:

=== Batman ===
- Volume One (ISBN 1563895641)
  - Batman: No Man's Land #1
  - Batman #563-564
  - Batman: Shadow of the Bat #83-84
  - Detective Comics #730-731
  - Batman: Legends of the Dark Knight #116
- Volume Two (ISBN 1563895994)
  - Batman: Legends of the Dark Knight #117, #119
  - Batman: Shadow of the Bat #85-87
  - Batman #565
  - Detective Comics #732-733
  - The Batman Chronicles #16
- Volume Three (ISBN 1563896346)
  - Batman #566-569
  - Batman: Legends of the Dark Knight #120-121
  - Batman: Shadow of the Bat #88
  - Detective Comics #734-735
  - The Batman Chronicles #17
- Volume Four (ISBN 1563896982)
  - Batman #570-572
  - The Batman Chronicles #18
  - Batman: Legends of the Dark Knight #125
  - Batman: Shadow of the Bat #92-93
  - Detective Comics #736, #738-739
- Volume Five (ISBN 1563897091)
  - Batman: No Man's Land #0
  - Batman #573-574
  - Batman: Legends of the Dark Knight #126
  - Batman: Shadow of the Bat #94
  - Detective Comics #740-741

=== Supporting cast ===
- Nightwing: A Darker Shade of Justice (ISBN 978-1563897030)
  - Nightwing #30-39, Nightwing Secret Files & Origins #1

=== Modern "complete" editions ===
In December 2011, DC started re-issuing the storyline in "complete" editions that collect all of the comics involved. The four comprehensive volumes were followed in 2015 by two prequel "Road to" volumes.

- Batman: Road to No Man's Land Volume 1 (ISBN 9781401258276)
  - Batman #555-559
  - Batman: Shadow of the Bat #75-79
  - Detective Comics #722,724-726
  - Robin #54
  - Batman Chronicles #14
- Batman: Road to No Man's Land Volume 2 (ISBN 9781401260637)
  - Batman #560-562
  - Detective Comics #727-729
  - Batman: Shadow of the Bat #80-82
  - Batman Chronicles #15
  - Azrael: Agent of the Bat #47-50
  - Batman: No Man's Land Secret Files #1
- Batman: No Man's Land Volume 1 (ISBN 1401232280)
  - Batman: No Man's Land #1
  - Batman: Shadow of the Bat #83-86
  - Batman #563-566
  - Detective Comics #730-733
  - Azrael: Agent of the Bat #51-55
  - Batman: Legends of the Dark Knight #116-118
  - Batman Chronicles #16
- Batman: No Man's Land Volume 2 (ISBN 1401233805)
  - Batman: Legends of the Dark Knight #119-121
  - Batman: Shadow of the Bat #87-88
  - Batman #567-568
  - Detective Comics #734-735
  - Young Justice in No Man's Land #1
  - Robin #67
  - Azrael: Agent of the Bat #56-57
  - Batman Chronicles #17
  - Nightwing #35-37
  - Catwoman #72-74
  - part of Batman: No Man's Land Gallery #1 (10 of the 32 pinups)
- Batman: No Man's Land Volume 3 (ISBN 1401234569)
  - Batman #569-571
  - Detective Comics #736-738
  - Azrael: Agent of the Bat #58
  - Batman: Legends of the Dark Knight #122-124
  - Batman: Shadow of the Bat #89-92
  - Robin #68-72
  - Batman: No Man's Land Secret Files and Origins #1
  - part of Batman: No Man's Land Gallery #1 (12 of the 32 pinups)
- Batman: No Man's Land Volume 4 (ISBN 1401235646)
  - Batman #572-574
  - Detective Comics #739-741
  - Azrael: Agent of the Bat #59-61
  - Batman: Legends of the Dark Knight #125-126
  - Batman: Shadow of the Bat #93-94
  - Robin #73
  - Batman Chronicles #18
  - Catwoman #75-77
  - Nightwing #38-39
  - Batman: No Man's Land #0.
  - part of Batman: No Man's Land Gallery #1 (4 of the 32 pinups)

=== Omnibus editions ===
DC released the Omnibus version of Road to No Man's Land in November, 2020 (which expanded on the contents of the two trade collections), and followed up with the first volume of the full No Man's Land Omnibus in January 2022. The second comprehensive volume followed in September, 2022. Volume 1 collects all the comics previously collected in Volumes 1 and 2 of the 2011 "complete" editions, and additionally the Batman: Harley Quinn one-shot as well as JLA #32.

- Batman: Road to No Man's Land Omnibus (ISBN 9781779506610)
  - Detective Comics #719-722, 724–729
  - Batman:Shadow of the Bat #73-82
  - Nightwing #19-20
  - Batman #553-562
  - Azrael #40, 47–50
  - Catwoman #56-57
  - Robin #52-54
  - Batman:Blackgate Isle of Men #1
  - Batman Chronicles #12, 14–15
  - Batman:Huntress/Spoiler #1
  - Batman:Arkham Asylum - Tales of Madness #1
  - Batman:No Man's Land Secret Files #1
- Batman: No Man's Land Omnibus Vol. 1 (ISBN 1779513224)
  - Batman: No Man's Land #1
  - Batman: Shadow of the Bat #83-88
  - Batman #563-568
  - Detective Comics #730-735
  - Azrael: Agent of the Bat #51-57
  - Batman: Legends of the Dark Knight #116-121
  - Batman Chronicles #16-17
  - Young Justice In No Man's Land #1
  - Robin #67
  - JLA #32
  - Nightwing #35-37
  - Batman: Harley Quinn #1
  - Catwoman #72-74
  - part of Batman: No Man's Land Gallery #1 (10 of the 32 pinups)
- Batman: No Man's Land Omnibus Vol. 2 (ISBN 1779517149)
  - Batman: Legends of the Dark Knight #122-126
  - Azrael: Agent of the Bat #58-61
  - Batman #569-574
  - Batman: Shadow of the Bat #89-94
  - Detective Comics #736-741
  - Catwoman #75-77
  - Robin #68-73
  - The Batman Chronicles #18
  - Nightwing #38-39
  - Batman No Man's Land #0
  - Batman: No Man's Land Secret Files #1

== In other media ==
=== Television ===
- In the mid-2000s, an animated TV show based on the "No Man's Land" storyline was put in development by producer James Tucker. Character designer Coran Stone worked on the project and made designs, but the project was ultimately scrapped for being "too dark", which led to Warner Bros. Animation and Cartoon Network focusing on Batman: The Brave and the Bold instead.
- In the late 2000s, Tucker made another attempt to adapt the "No Man's Land" storyline into a TV series. Some artwork was made, but the project was also cancelled for having a dark premise like the previous attempt.
- The fourth and fifth season of the live-action series Gotham adapted some plot elements of the "No Man's Land" storyline. In addition, the season four finale was named after the comic. Jeremiah Valeska allied himself with Ra's al Ghul and the League of Shadows before planting generator bombs at Gotham City's bridges. When Barbara Kean forced Bruce Wayne into stabbing Ra's, the bombs exploded. While most of Gotham's citizens were evacuated by boat, Bruce stayed behind to help James Gordon, Harvey Bullock, Lucius Fox, and the remaining members of the GCPD. As a result of the governor declaring Gotham a "no man's land", the GCPD and various criminal gangs claimed territories across the city. Nyssa al Ghul disguised Delta Force as a relief group to infiltrate Gotham and destroy it in retaliation for what happened to Ra's. However, Gotham's remaining citizens and the U.S. military thwarted her plans. While she escaped, Gotham began restoration efforts.
- In the season one finale of the animated series Harley Quinn, the Joker detonates a tower in an attempt to kill the titular character, setting off an 8.6 earthquake that devastates Gotham in the process. In the aftermath, the President of the United States isolated Gotham from the rest of the country and surviving villains Bane, the Riddler, Two-Face, Penguin, and Mr. Freeze formed the Injustice League to take over and divide the ruins amongst themselves while Harley Quinn and her crew celebrate in the resulting anarchy. After learning of the Injustice League however, Harley makes it her mission to take them down. Penguin is killed by Harley, Riddler is captured and used to power Harley's hideout, and Mr. Freeze sacrifices his life to save his wife, Nora Fries. These losses force Bane and Two-Face to work together to maintain control. While he is recuperating after being injured during the earthquake, Batman has Commissioner Gordon work with Batgirl to take back Gotham. Eventually, Gordon is able to defeat and incarcerate Two-Face while Harley and Poison Ivy defeats Bane, leading to the Injustice League's dissolution. Afterwards, the President tasks Gordon with killing Harley before he can allow Gotham to rejoin the U.S. Following a battle between Gotham's citizens who were rallied by Gordon and an army of Parademons led by Harley, which leaves most of the city in ruins again, the latter realizes she went too far and surrenders, letting Gordon win. Following this, Gotham eventually returns to normal and rejoins the U.S.

=== Films ===
The second act of the 2012 live-action film The Dark Knight Rises is inspired by "No Man's Land", which depicts Gotham City being cut off from the rest of the world and placed under criminal control due to the efforts of the League of Shadows, led by Bane and Talia al Ghul.

=== Video games ===
- Elements of "No Man's Land" are also used in the video game Batman: Arkham City, such as an ongoing turf war between members of Batman's rogues gallery after being closed off from the rest of civilization by a heavily enforced quarantine (although in this case only a single district of Gotham City has been closed off). Also, an earthquake is said to have taken place before the game's events, leading to the collapse and flooding of the "Amusement Mile" section of the penal colony. It is implied that this may have been caused by Ra's al Ghul's digging through the old, dilapidated sections of East Gotham in order to find his old "Wonder City" project and its Lazarus Pit located in the 'Old Gotham' ruins beneath Arkham City.
- In Batman: Arkham Knight, much of Gotham is evacuated after a bomb threat by Scarecrow and separated from the mainland, similar to the comic, although the supervillains are loosely working together, in contrast to Arkham City.
- Elements of Batman: No Man's Land are used for the plot of the first inFamous game. After a catastrophic disaster called "The Blast" and the resulting plague outbreak, Empire City is cut off from the rest of the country by a militarily enforced quarantine. Due to the lack of outside intervention and a severely diminished police presence, society within the city begins to collapse. In the anarchy, gang leaders take over the three districts before starting a massive gang war with each other for total control of the city, marking their territories with posters with their gang insignia's on them similar to the symbol tagging done by Batman and his enemies. Protagonist Cole McGrath, a bicycle messenger turned superhuman by The Blast, is forced to fight through and reclaim the city districts while looking for the Ray Sphere - the device responsible for the Blast - and uncovering the conspiracy surrounding it and the subsequent quarantine.

=== Prose novel and audiobook ===
Cover of the hardcover by Greg Rucka. Art by Joe DeVito.

In 2000, DC Comics published a novelization of "No Man's Land" written by Greg Rucka. The story features many of the same characters as the comic book arc. It also describes other members of the GCPD. The book omits the characters of Azrael and Superman, who were present throughout in the comics. Rucka had to deliver the novel to the publisher approximately two to three months before the comics version of No Man's Land finished, meaning that the novelization's ending was finished before the final scripts for the comics storyline were even written.

There is also a shorter junior novel written by Alan Grant.

GraphicAudio produced an audiobook of the novelization which spans two volumes and features a full cast, music and sound effects. The first part was released in October and the second part in November 2011.
