= The Batman Chronicles =

Comic book series by DC Comics

- Cover of The Batman Chronicles #1 (May 1995), art by Bill Sienkiewicz and Lee Weeks

Publication information
- Publisher: DC Comics
- Schedule: Quarterly
- Format: Ongoing series
- Publication date: July 1995 - Winter 2001
- No. of issues: 23

The Batman Chronicles is a series of comics published by DC Comics from 1995 to 2001, which lasted 23 quarterly issues.

== Publication history ==
With a larger page count than typical comics of the time, most issues contained three separate stories, with Batman usually featuring in at least one of them, and others featuring Batman's friends and foes. The additional four issues of a quarterly title allowed DC to, along with the four existent monthly titles, publish a Batman comic every week of the year.

== Collected editions ==
- Batman: Anarky (The Batman Chronicles #1)
- Batman: Contagion (The Batman Chronicles #4)
- Batman: Arkham - Two-Face (The Batman Chronicles #8)
- Batgirl: The Greatest Stories Ever Told (The Batman Chronicles #9)
- Batman: Year 100 (The Batman Chronicles #11)
- Batman: Cataclysm (The Batman Chronicles #12)
- Batman: Road to No Man's Land Vol. 1 (The Batman Chronicles #14)
- Batman: Road to No Man's Land Vol. 2 (The Batman Chronicles #15-16)
- Batman: No Man's Land Vol. 1 (The Batman Chronicles #16)
- Batman: No Man's Land Vol. 2 (The Batman Chronicles #17)
- Batman: No Man's Land Vol. 4 (The Batman Chronicles #18)
