= Red Robin (identity) =

Superhero in DC Comics

- Tim Drake as Red Robin on the cover of Red Robin #19 (March 2011). Art by Marcus To
- Publisher: DC Comics
- First appearance: Kingdom Come #2 (June 1996)
- Created by: Mark Waid; Alex Ross
- Characters: Dick Grayson; Jason Todd; Ulysses Hadrian Armstrong; Tim Drake

Red Robin

Series publication information
- Publisher: DC Comics
- Schedule: Monthly
- Format: Ongoing series
- Genre: Superhero
- Publication date: August 2009 – August 2011
- Number of issues: 26
- Main character(s): Tim Drake; Dick Grayson

Creative team
- Writer(s): Chris Yost
- Penciller(s): Ramon Bachs; Marcus To

Red Robin is a name that has been used by several superheroes appearing in American comic books published by DC Comics. The identity was first used in the future timeline of the 1996 miniseries Kingdom Come, where a middle-aged Dick Grayson reclaims the Robin mantle and becomes Red Robin. His uniform is closer to Batman's in design than any previous Robin uniform. Red Robin reappeared in promotional material for the DC Countdown miniseries and was later revealed to be Jason Todd. This was the first time the identity had been used in the main DC Universe reality. During the "Scattered Pieces" tie-in to the "Batman R.I.P." storyline, Ulysses Armstrong briefly appears as Red Robin. In 2009, a new ongoing series was introduced titled Red Robin starring Tim Drake (then under the name Tim Wayne) in the role. Drake was the third Robin before assuming the Red Robin persona.

== Main continuity incarnations ==
=== Jason Todd ===
In Countdown to Final Crisis #14, Jason dons the outfit in the "Bat Bunker" (Earth-51's equivalent to the Batcave) as he and Earth-51 Batman join the fight raging on Earth above the bunker. Jason keeps his new suit and identity for the rest of his tenure as a "Challenger of the Unknown", only to discard it on his return to New Earth. At the start of Countdown, Jason Todd resumes the Red Hood persona and rescues a woman from Duela Dent.

A teaser image released to promote Countdown showed a figure resembling Red Robin among assembled heroes in poses symbolic of their roles in the series. After a series of contradictory statements about this figure, executive editor Dan DiDio stated that Red Robin was Jason Todd. In issue #14 of Countdown, Jason dons the Red Robin suit and goes into battle alongside Earth-51's Batman. During a battle with a group of Monarch's soldiers, Earth-51 Batman is killed by Ultraman, with Earth-51 being destroyed shortly afterwards as Jason, Donna Troy, Ray Palmer, and Kyle Rayner escape. When the Challengers return to their Earth, Jason disposes of his Red Robin costume and abandons the group.

=== Ulysses Armstrong ===
During the Scattered Pieces tie in to the Batman R.I.P. storyline, a new Red Robin appears, at first only as a glimmering image following Robin (Tim Drake) and suspected to have stolen a briefcase of money from the Penguin. Tim initially suspects Jason Todd of reprising his Red Robin persona. However, Jason claims innocence, supposing that someone may have stolen his suit when he discarded it earlier. The new Red Robin breaks up a scuffle between Tim and Jason, and is later revealed to be Ulysses Armstrong, who is using Jason's Red Robin suit as part of a campaign of psychological warfare against Tim Drake. Armstrong later changes costumes when he reveals himself to be the new Anarky. After being severely burned in an explosion, Tim Drake takes the Red Robin suit to hide his wounds.

=== Tim Drake ===
After Dick Grayson takes up the mantle of Batman, he gives the title of Robin to Damian Wayne, claiming that Robin is a student of Batman and that he sees Tim as an equal. Tim begrudgingly accepts. Tim is now the new Red Robin—an identity that is already tarnished and independent of the Bat-family—traveling the world searching for Bruce Wayne.

Alfred Pennyworth altered the costume while mending it after the uniform sustained significant damage during Tim's confrontation with Ra's al Ghul. The new features include a bulkier utility belt and a "paracape" with gliding capabilities.

== Alternative versions ==
=== Kingdom Come ===
In Kingdom Come, a middle-aged Dick Grayson reclaims the Robin mantle and becomes Red Robin, not at the side of his former mentor Batman, but rather with Superman's League. His uniform is closer to Batman's in design than any previous Robin uniform.

== Ongoing series ==
With writers Chris Yost on the first three arcs and Fabian Nicieza on the rest and primary pencils by Marcus To, Red Robin features former Robin Tim Drake under the identity of Red Robin. The debut of the series follows the events of Batman R.I.P., Final Crisis, and Battle for the Cowl in which the original Batman, Bruce Wayne, apparently died at the hands of DC Comics villain Darkseid. Of all the characters in the so-called "Batman family", Tim (now technically a Wayne after his adoption by Bruce) is the only one that believes Bruce Wayne is still alive and leaves Gotham City to begin a global search for evidence supporting his theory and hope.

== In other media ==
=== Film ===
- The Tim Drake incarnation of Red Robin appears in Batman Unlimited, voiced by Yuri Lowenthal.
- The Tim Drake incarnation of Red Robin appears in Batman Ninja, voiced by Will Friedle.
- The Jason Todd incarnation of Red Robin appears in Batman: Death in the Family, voiced by Vincent Martella.
- The Tim Drake incarnation of Red Robin appears in Batman Ninja vs. Yakuza League, voiced by Nathan Wilson.

=== Video games ===
- Red Robin appears as a skin for Tim Drake in Batman: Arkham City.
- The Tim Drake incarnation of Red Robin appears in Lego Batman 2: DC Super Heroes, voiced by Charlie Schlatter.
- The Tim Drake incarnation of Red Robin appears as a character summon in Scribblenauts Unmasked: A DC Comics Adventure.
- The Tim Drake incarnation of Red Robin appears in the mobile version of Injustice: Gods Among Us.
- Red Robin appears as a skin for Tim Drake in Young Justice: Legacy.
- The Tim Drake incarnation of Red Robin appears as a playable character in Lego DC Super-Villains, voiced by Cameron Bowen.

=== Miscellaneous ===
- Red Robin appears in Teen Titans Go! #48. This version is an evil alternate universe counterpart of Robin.
- The Tim Drake incarnation of Red Robin appears in the Injustice: Gods Among Us prequel comic.
- The Tim Drake incarnation of Red Robin appears in the Injustice 2 prequel comic.
