= Faces of Evil =

2009 DC Comics event

"Faces of Evil" thematic stories
- Image promoting the "Faces of Evil" event

Publication information
- Publisher: DC Comics
Title(s)
Faces of Evil: Deathstroke
Faces of Evil: Grundy
Faces of Evil: Kobra
Faces of Evil: Prometheus
- Formats: Multiple, thematically linked individual issues from multiple ongoing series and one-shot titles.
- Publication date: March 2009
- Main character(s): DC Universe

Creative team
- Writer(s): Various
- Artist(s): Various

"Faces of Evil" is a DC Comics "event" in January 2009, that editor Dan DiDio described as "inspirationally tied to Final Crisis," with focus placed on the villains of the particular titles involved in and associated with the event. Numerous monthly books had villains displayed on their covers while four additional one-shots were published.

== Titles ==
The full list of issues is:

Title	Depicted cover villain	Author	Cover artist(s)
Action Comics #873	Lex Luthor	Geoff Johns	José Ladrönn
Batman #685	Catwoman	Paul Dini	Alex Ross
Birds of Prey #126	Calculator	Tony Bedard	Stephane Roux
Booster Gold #16	Enemy Ace	Dan Jurgens	Dan Jurgens
Detective Comics #852	Hush	Paul Dini	Andrew Robinson
Faces of Evil: Deathstroke	Deathstroke	David Hine	José Ladrönn
Faces of Evil: Grundy	Solomon Grundy	Scott Kolins and Geoff Johns	Shane Davis
Faces of Evil: Kobra	Kobra	Ivan Brandon	Andrew Robinson
Faces of Evil: Prometheus	Prometheus	Sterling Gates	Mauro Cascioli
Green Arrow/Black Canary #16	Merlyn	Andrew Kreisberg	José Ladrönn
Green Lantern #37	Laira	Geoff Johns	Shane Davis
Green Lantern Corps #32	Kryb	Peter Tomasi	Patrick Gleason
Justice League of America #29	Starbreaker	Len Wein	Ed Benes
Justice Society of America #23	Black Adam	Geoff Johns	Alex Ross
Nightwing #152	Ra's al Ghul	Peter Tomasi	Brian Stelfreeze
Robin #182	Anarky (Ulysses H. Armstrong)	Fabian Nicieza	Brian Stelfreeze
Secret Six #5	Deadshot	Gail Simone	Nicola Scott
Supergirl #37	Superwoman	Sterling Gates	Joshua Middleton
Superman #684	Parasite	James Robinson	Alex Ross
Teen Titans #67	Brother Blood	Sean McKeever	Eddy Barrows
Titans #9	Jericho	Judd Winick	Tony Daniel
Vigilante #2	Vigilante	Marv Wolfman	Andrew Robinson
Wonder Woman #28	Cheetah	Gail Simone	Aaron Lopresti

The kids-friendly book Tiny Titans also featured a "Faces of Mischief" issue around the same time, written by Art Baltazar and Franco Aureliani, and illustrated by Baltazar.

The issues of Superman and Action Comics are epilogues to the Superman: New Krypton crossover series. Nightwing is a continuation of the "Batman R.I.P." aftermath storyline, "Last Rites". Detective Comics and Batman comprise a self-contained storyline dependent on each other.

The Faces of Evil event continued in the storyline "Deathtrap", that focuses on Jericho, which starts in Teen Titans Annual 2009, and then carries on in a crossover between Teen Titans #70-71, Titans #12-13 and Vigilante #5.

A seven-part Solomon Grundy miniseries, by Johns and Kolins, picked up where Faces of Evil: Grundy left off.
