= General (comics) =

General, in comics, may refer to:

- General (DC Comics), a Batman villain
- General Wade Eiling, who has gone by the alias The General
- General, a Marvel Comics supervillain and opponent of Sentry

It may also refer to:

- August General in Iron, a DC Comics Chinese superhero and member of the Great Ten
- General Glory, two DC Comics characters
- General Ross, a Marvel Comics character and opponent of the Hulk
- General Zahl, a DC Comics supervillain
- General Zod, a DC Comics supervillain and enemy of Superman

== See also ==
- General (disambiguation)
