= José Ladrönn =

Mexican comics artist

- Born: José Omar Ladrönn; 1967 (age 58–59) Minatitlán, Veracruz, Mexico
- Areas: Penciller, Inker
- Pseudonym: Ladrönn
- Notable works: Hip Flask, Inhumans, Final Incal
- Awards: Best Painter/Multimedia Artist Eisner (2006)

José Omar Ladrönn (born 1967) is a comic book penciller and inker, born in Mexico.

== Biography ==
Comic book titles he has contributed to include Cable, Spider-Boy Team-Up, Superman Transilvane and Inhumans. In the 2006 he received an Eisner Award (Best Painter/Multimedia Artist) for his work with writer and publisher Richard Starkings on Hip Flask: Mystery City, one of a series of Hip Flask one-shots published by Active Images.

In 2004, he worked with the Chilean author Alejandro Jodorowsky in the story Tears of gold published in the U.S. by Metal Hurlant magazine.

Prior to 2010, he also regularly contributed covers for various titles such as Marvel's Incredible Hulk and DC Comics' Countdown to Infinite Crisis: The OMAC Project.

He is currently working on Hip Flask volume 5 as well The Sons of El Topo with Alejandro Jodorowsky.

== Bibliography ==
Interior comic work includes:

- Cable #-1, 48-70 (with James Robinson and Joe Casey, Marvel Comics, 1997–1999)
- Final Incal (with Alejandro Jodorowsky, Humanoids Publishing, 2014)
- Sons of El Topo - "Les Fils d'El Topo - Tome 1 - Caïn" (with Alejandro Jodorowsky, 2016)
- Thor Annual 2000 (with Dan Jurgens, Marvel Comics, 2000)

=== Covers only ===
- Uncanny X-Men #-1 (Marvel, 1997)
- Cable #46, 56–57, 63 (Marvel, 1997–1999)
- Thor #14 (Marvel, 1999)
- X-51 #2 (Marvel, 1999)
- The New Eternals: Apocalypse Now #1 (Marvel, 2000)
- The Jack Kirby Collector #32 (TwoMorrows, 2001)
- The Incal #1-3, 10-11 (Humanoids Publishing, 2001–2002)
- Alter Nation #2 (Image, 2004)
- The OMAC Project #1-6, Infinite Crisis Special (DC Comics, 2005–2006)
- Conan #20-22 (Dark Horse, 2005)
- Wonder Woman v2 #219 (DC Comics, 2005)
- The Flash v2 #226 (DC Comics, 2005)
- Incredible Hulk v2 #92-105 (Marvel, 2006–2007)
- Elephantmen #1-13, 20, 22, The Pilot (Image, 2006–2009)
- The All-New Atom #5-25 (DC Comics, 2007–2008)
- Fantastic Four Omnibus Volume 2 hc (Marvel, 2007)
- Elephantmen: War Toys #1-3 (Image, 2007–2008)
- Green Arrow/Black Canary #15-29 (DC Comics, 2009–2010)
- The War That Time Forgot #9 (DC Comics, 2009)
- Faces of Evil: Deathstroke #1 (DC Comics, 2009)
- Action Comics #873 (DC Comics, 2009)
- Superman: World of New Krypton #1, 12 (DC Comics, 2009–2010)
- Batman: Battle for the Cowl: Commissioner Gordon #1 (DC Comics, 2009)
- Batman: Battle for the Cowl: Arkham Asylum #1 (DC Comics, 2009)
- Batman: Battle for the Cowl: Man-Bat #1 (DC Comics, 2009)
- Batman: Battle for the Cowl: The Underground #1 (DC Comics, 2009)
- Batman: Battle for the Cowl: The Network #1 (DC Comics, 2009)
- Green Lantern Corps #43 (DC Comics, 2010)
- The Spirit #1-17 (DC Comics, 2010–2011)
- Incredible Hulk v3 #1 (Marvel, 2011)
- All-Star Western v3 #4-10 (DC Comics, 2012)
- Monster Matador: Once Upon Some Monsters in Mexico #4 (2510 Press, 2024)

== Awards ==
- 2006: Won "Best Painter/Multimedia Artist (Interior)" Eisner Award, for Hip Flask: Mystery City
