= Red Robin (disambiguation) =

Red Robin is an American restaurant chain. The title may also refer to:

== Flora and fauna ==
- American robin (Turdus migratorius), a common species of bird
- Geranium robertianum (herb-Robert), a plant species
- Silene chalcedonica (nonesuch), a plant species
- Red Robin (Photinia x fraseri), a popular cultivar of the small tree and large shrub genus Photinia

== Comics ==
- Red Robin (comic book), the ongoing monthly comic featuring the pre-Flashpoint incarnation of Red Robin
  - Red Robin (identity), several characters in the DC Comics universe

== Music ==
- Red Robin Records, record label
- "When the Red, Red Robin (Comes Bob, Bob, Bobbin' Along)", a song
