= The General =

The General or The Generals may refer to:

== Film and television ==
- The General (1926 film), a Buster Keaton film
- The General (1992 film), a Russian war film
- The General (1998 film), a John Boorman drama about Dublin criminal Martin Cahill
- The General (TV series), a British TV fly-on-the-wall documentary series about a hospital
- "The General" (The Prisoner), an episode of The Prisoner
- "The General", an episode of Spyforce
- "The General" (Star Wars: The Clone Wars)

== Literature ==
=== Fictional works ===
- The General (poem), a 1917 poem by Siegfried Sassoon
- The General (Forester novel), a work about a World War I general by C. S. Forester
- The General (Muchamore novel), a novel in the CHERUB book series by Robert Muchamore
- The General (series), a series of science fiction novels by S. M. Stirling
- The General (Sillitoe novel), a World War II novel by Alan Sillitoe
- The Generals (novel), a 2007 novel by Simon Scarrow
- The Generals, a novel in the series Brotherhood of War by W. E. B. Griffin

=== Fictional characters ===
- General (DC Comics), an enemy of Batman and other DC superheroes
- General Wade Eiling, another DC Comics supervillain, sometimes known as simply "The General"
- The General, an enemy found in Marvel's Sentry

=== Non-fiction works ===
- The General (Fenby book), a biography of Charles de Gaulle by Jonathan Fenby
- The General (Bilby book), a biography of David Sarnoff by Kenneth W. Bilby

== Music ==
- "The General" (Dispatch song), 1998
- The General (Guns N' Roses song), 2023
- "The General", a song by The Rifles from Great Escape

== Other uses ==
- The General (horse), a horse owned by American President John Tyler
- The General (Idaho), a mountain in the United States
- The General (locomotive), a locomotive commandeered in the Great Locomotive Chase of the American Civil War
- The General (insurance), an insurance agency specializing in automobile insurance, formerly Permanent General
- The General (magazine), a wargaming magazine published by Avalon Hill
- The Generals (game), a strategy game published in 1980
- The General, a nickname for US automobile manufacturer General Motors

== People with the nickname ==
- Martin Cahill (1949-1994), Dublin criminal
- Sherman Douglas (born 1966), American retired National Basketball Association player
- Charles de Gaulle (1890–1970), French statesman and general
- Horace Grant (born 1965), American retired National Basketball Association player
- Les Keiter, American newscaster and sports director
- Bob Knight (1940-2023), American college basketball coach and TV analyst
- Mark Lee (Australian rules footballer) (born 1959), Richmond ruckman of the 1980s
- Rinus Michels (1928-2005), Dutch football player and manager

== See also ==
- El General, Panamanian reggaeton artist born Edgardo Franco in 1964
- General (disambiguation)
