= Generalate =

Generalate may refer to:

- Generalate (office), the office, rank, or position of a general
- Karlovac Generalate, a section of the Habsburg Military Frontier
- Varaždin Generalate, a section of the Habsburg Military Frontier
- colloquial term for a building hosting a General Staff

== See also ==
- General (disambiguation)
- Palace of Slavonian General Command
