= General (disambiguation) =

A general is a high-ranking military officer.

General(s) may also refer to:

== Companies ==
- General Airconditioners, a Japanese air-conditioning company
- London General, a bus operating company in London
- General Records, an American record label

== Sports teams ==
- Washington Generals, an American exhibition basketball team, known for opposing the Harlem Globetrotters
- New Jersey Generals, a franchise in the defunct United States Football League
- Greensboro Generals, a minor league ice hockey team from Greensboro, North Carolina
- Oshawa Generals, a junior ice hockey team in the Ontario Hockey League
- EAC Generals, varsity teams of Emilio Aguinaldo College in the Philippines
- Washington and Lee Generals, the athletics teams of Washington and Lee University, Lexington, Virginia
- Generals, mascot and athletics teams of Washington-Lee High School in Arlington, Virginia
- The Generals, the athletic teams of SUNY Sullivan, a community college in Loch Sheldrake, New York

== Arts and entertainment ==
=== Games ===
- General (video game), a turn-based strategic game developed by NewGame Software
- Command & Conquer: Generals, a real-time strategy computer game by Electronic Arts
- General, a character in the Mega Man X4 video game

=== Music ===
- General (musician) (1976-2024), South African kwaito musician
- Generals (album), an album by The Mynabirds
- General, an album by Circle (Finnish band)
- "General", a song by Jay Chou from the 2004 album Common Jasmine Orange
- "General", a song by JID from the 2017 album The Never Story

=== Other arts and entertainment ===
- General (DC Comics), or The General, a comic book character
- General (G.I. Joe), the G.I. Joe team's mobile strike headquarters
- General (2019 film), a biopic by Croatian film director Antun Vrdoljak

== Other uses ==
- General (newspaper), a Malayalam-language daily newspaper in Kerala, India
- NHK General TV, a Japanese television channel
- General (train), a passenger train operated by the Pennsylvania Railroad
- General hospital, or simply "general", a common type of hospital
- General of The Salvation Army, the international leader of a Christian denomination
- General, the middle of three standard grade tiers of the Scottish Qualifications Authority's National Qualifications

== See also ==
- General Dynamics, an American defence conglomerate
- General Electric, an American multinational conglomerate company founded in 1892
- General Mills, an American manufacturer and marketer of consumer foods
- General Motors, an American automotive manufacturer
- General snus, a popular brand of Swedish snuff
- General Tire, a tire manufacturer
- The General (disambiguation)
