= Gotham City Sirens =

American comic book series published by DC Comics

- Cover of Gotham City Sirens #1 (August 2009). Art by Guillem March.

Publication information
- Publisher: DC Comics
- Schedule: Monthly
- Format: Finished
- Publication date: June 2009 – August 2011
- No. of issues: 26
- Main character(s): Catwoman; Harley Quinn; Poison Ivy

Creative team
- Created by: Paul Dini; Guillem March
- Written by: Paul Dini (#1, 2, 4–7, 9–11); Tony Bedard (#12–15); Peter Calloway (#16–26)
- Artist(s): Guillem March (#1–6, 8–9); David López (#7); Andres Guinaldo (#10–11, 13–17, 19–26); Peter Nguyen (#12–13); Jeremy Haun (#18); Ramon Bachs (#20)
- Letterer: Steve Wands
- Colorist: José Villarrubia
- Editor(s): Mike Marts; Janelle Siegel

Gotham City Sirens was an American comic book series that was written by Paul Dini with art by Guillem March and published by the comic book publishing company DC Comics. The term Gotham City Sirens refers to three of the most popular female villains inhabiting Gotham City: Catwoman, Harley Quinn, and Poison Ivy.

The first issue of the series was released in June 2009, as a part of the Batman: Reborn relaunch of DC's entire line of comic book titles featuring the superhero Batman.

== Plot ==
=== Setting ===
Shortly after the events of the Heart of Hush, Batman R.I.P., Final Crisis, and Battle for the Cowl storylines, Hush cuts out Catwoman's heart, Batman retrieves it, and Zatanna heals her. Catwoman gets her revenge by stealing all of Hush's money and giving it to Gotham City's female criminals, Harley Quinn and Poison Ivy, as well as Holly Robinson. Bruce Wayne is thought to be dead and is replaced by Dick Grayson.

=== "Union" ===
When Catwoman fights a new villain named "Boneblaster", it is revealed she still has physical limitations from her ordeal in "Heart of Hush" and is nearly easily beaten by the two-bit thug. However, Poison Ivy arrives to save Catwoman and offers her to return to her new hideout, which is actually the hideout of the Riddler, whom Poison Ivy has seduced and drugged. Catwoman discovers Harley Quinn is also living with them, and proposes that the three women join together to protect one another as a team, but first Harley Quinn and Poison Ivy want to know who Batman really is.

When Poison Ivy uses a truth serum powder derived from plants, Catwoman reveals that she cannot because Talia, Ra's al Ghul's daughter and leader of the League of Assassins, used mind control techniques to prevent Catwoman from being forced to reveal his identity as Bruce Wayne. Talia taught Catwoman a meditation technique so that any sort of mind-control, such as Ivy's spores, will not affect her.

Harley Quinn leaves Poison Ivy's hideout, while Grayson, who is acting as Batman, and the "reformed" Riddler solve a coinciding case that leads to Quinn encountering Bruce Wayne. Unbeknownst to her, he is actually Hush, who had reconstructed his face to be that of Wayne so he could control Wayne Enterprises. Hush plans to kill Quinn, but when footage of the two together reaches Joker, he decides to kill Harley since he cannot have her. The Joker is revealed to not be himself at all, but an old sidekick of his named Gaggy, who is angered at Harley for replacing him. Poison Ivy and Catwoman manage to save Harley and escape.

The three Sirens take separate holidays during Christmas time. After Catwoman fights a gang of "knife-wielding Santas" who had been attacking people, she joins Dick Grayson and Damian Wayne for Christmas before Damian has the duo leave to catch a murderer. Poison Ivy visits the South American jungles where she pauses her holiday to save a few tourists who stumbled into a drug lord's processing plant. After defeating the drug soldiers, Poison Ivy deduces that she needs to spend time in both the plant and human worlds and returns to Gotham. Harley Quinn visits her dysfunctional family with rocky results. Harley then decides to return home to the Sirens' shared Gotham City hideout where the three women spend the rest of Christmas together.

=== "Songs of the Sirens" ===
Poison Ivy is framed for a series of murders on serial arsonists in Robinson Park. After investigating the murders herself, Poison Ivy is kidnapped by a renegade police officer, who believes her to be the murderer, and left in a hole to die without food, water or sunlight. Catwoman and Harley Quinn work together to save Poison Ivy and find a corrupt cop and the real murderer with James Gordon's help. When they find Poison Ivy's hidden and shrivelled up body without a pulse, Catwoman saves her by tossing her into water, claiming that when your plants seem dead, you water them. With Poison Ivy revived, the Sirens find the real murderer and kill him themselves, making it look like he was just another victim.

Catwoman, Poison Ivy and Harley Quinn discover a body literally dropped into their lap and previously planted with evidence that it was the Sirens that killed her. Together, the girls enlist the help of the Riddler once again to find the real person trying to frame them, who is actually Doctor Aesop, wanting to take back Catwoman's hideout as his own. Around the same time, wanting to establish herself as something other than a villain, Poison Ivy takes a job at the Gotham City branch of S.T.A.R. Labs, under an assumed identity "Paula Irving" due to her criminal history. She is soon discovered by one of the scientists whom she had fired on her first day, but rather than killing them Ivy instead renews their contract, impressed with the worker's intelligence and deductive skills. Also, Harley Quinn and Catwoman discover Harley's pet hyenas have been escaping at night and hunting and eating local dogs, prompting Catwoman to tell Harley to give the hyenas away to a zoo, which Harley is against.

=== "Sister Zero" ===
While Catwoman is on a private caper trying to discover information on her escaped and mentally unstable sister, Maggie Kyle, finds the home of a renowned exorcist looking for help in saving her sister. Incorrectly thinking the exorcist is also in league with Selina's "cat demon", Maggie kills her and steals her exorcism equipment, discovering a container with a supernatural substance in the guise of an angel. This substance bestows her with supernatural strength and speed and a warped perception of reality. She gets Catwoman, who brings Harley Quinn with her, to meet her and proceeds to attack Harley and Catwoman. During the fight Harley attacks Maggie and calls her "Sister Zero" as an insult, but Maggie likes this name and uses it. The fight continues until Catwoman can show Maggie she's not possessed, breaking the spell on her momentarily before the "angel" regains control. In that time Maggie decides not to kill Catwoman and leaves. The arc ends with Maggie proclaiming things weren't over and that she now knew she could save her sister through exorcism instead of killing her.

=== "Strange Fruit" ===
Ivy confesses to Ms. Adams, that her main reason why she wants to work in S.T.A.R. labs is that she is looking for a certain chemical that has the ability to grow a forest overnight. In her search, what she encounters is an alien life form which is an intelligent plant, who was captured by the doctor. Seemingly coming under the plant's control and being promised to be its queen, Ivy aids its escape from the lab, battling Catwoman and Harley Quinn on her way to Gotham Park, where the entity plans on spreading her spores in an attempt to take over the planet. When her friends intervene, stopping the plant creature's plan, Ivy turns on him, helping to stop the propagation of his flower bulbs and killing him while telling him that she was used by a man she loves before, and that it will never happen again.

Catwoman is abducted by a villain named Senpai for her invaluable information of Batman's real identity, and Ivy and Harley team up with Talia and Zatanna to rescue her. When they defeated the villain, Zatanna and Talia realize that Catwoman is in great danger because of her knowledge, and Talia convinces Zatanna to use her magic to erase it. Talia manages to distract Harley and Ivy as Zatanna scans Selina's memories, but she eventually realizes that Talia only wants to erase Selina's memory of Batman's identity because she cannot bear that another woman whom Batman also loves has this information. Zatanna leaves Selina's memories untouched, then confronts Talia and tells her that she now knows that she set up everything. They briefly fight, but Talia decides she does not want to fight anymore and fires at Selina instead, prompting Zatanna to rescue her. Zatanna asks forgiveness from Selina and still offers her to remove her memories of Batman to ease her burden, but she turns the offer down.

=== "Division" ===
Shortly thereafter all three women feel spurned and neglected by their men of choice, and Harley seeks out Catwoman to console her about her loving Batman, making an equivalence to her feelings for Joker, but Catwoman's discontent stirs anger in Harley, who goes to seek out vengeance on her ex-boyfriend.

Harley betrays her two friends and breaks into Arkham with the goal of killing the Joker for abusing her as often as he did. Harley ultimately chooses to instead release Joker from his cell, and together the two orchestrate a violent takeover of the facility that results in most of the guards and staff members either being killed or taken hostage by the inmates. Harley and the Joker are eventually defeated by Batman and Catwoman, and Harley is last seen being wheeled away while bound in a straitjacket and muzzle. Shortly after this, Poison Ivy breaks into Harley's cell and attempts to kill her for her betrayal, but instead pities her and offers to free her if she helps kill Catwoman, who had left both of her fellow Sirens behind in Arkham to be captured. Harley and Ivy subsequently escape and try to exact revenge on Selina. A massive fight ensues, which ends with Catwoman revealing that since the group first came together, she had been using her connections with Batman to keep Harley and Ivy from being arrested and that she saw good in them and only wanted to help. Harley and Ivy allow Catwoman to go free. Just as Batman is about to arrest them, Catwoman helps the two of them escape and the series ends with all three members of the group going their separate ways.

== Aftermath ==
In The New 52 reboot of DC's continuity, the Gotham City Sirens do not exist and are never mentioned as a group. In the new continuity, Catwoman received a new ongoing title written by Judd Winick and drawn by Gotham City Sirens artist Guillem March, Harley Quinn was now a member of the revamped Suicide Squad series, and Poison Ivy is featured in the new Birds of Prey.

== Revival ==
In May 2024, DC Comics announced a four-issued weekly revival comic series of Gotham City Sirens coming out in August 2024, written by Leah Williams and pencilled by Matteo Lolli. It will feature Catwoman, Harley Quinn and Poison Ivy back as the members of the title team, along with Punchline appearing in it as the series's main antagonist.

== Collected editions ==
Title	Issues collected	Publication date	ISBN
Original trade paperbacks
Vol. 1: Union	Gotham City Sirens #1-7	April 2010	978-1401225704
Vol. 2: Songs of the Sirens	Gotham City Sirens #8-13, Catwoman #83	November 2010	978-1401229078
Vol. 3: Strange Fruit	Gotham City Sirens #14-19	August 2011	978-1401231378
Vol. 4: Division	Gotham City Sirens #20-21, 23-26	March 2012	978-1401233938
Batman: Gotham Shall Be Judged	Azrael #14-18; Batman #708-709; Gotham City Sirens #22; Red Robin #22	March 2012	978-1401233785
Trade paperback reprints
Gotham City Sirens: Book One	Gotham City Sirens #1-13	28 October 2014	978-1401251758
Gotham City Sirens: Book Two	Gotham City Sirens #14-26	5 May 2015	978-1401254124
Omnibus
Harley Quinn & the Gotham City Sirens Omnibus	Gotham City Sirens #1-26; Catwoman #83	24 April 2018	978-1401278397
DC Compact Comics
Harley Quinn & the Gotham City Sirens	Gotham City Sirens #1-13	3 September 2024	978-1401251758

== In other media ==
=== Television ===
- A loose depiction of the Gotham City Sirens appears in the fourth season of Gotham, consisting of Selina Kyle, Tabitha Galavan, and Barbara Kean.
- The Gotham City Sirens appears in the Teen Titans Go! episode "Jam", consisting of Harley Quinn, Poison Ivy, and Catwoman. Additionally, Starfire and Raven appear as temporary members. This version of the group is a roller derby team.
- The Gotham City Sirens make a cameo appearance in Harley Quinn. In the episode "Killer's Block", Catwoman, Harley Quinn, Poison Ivy, and Barbara Gordon form the eponymous group. However, as of the episode "The Big Apricot", they disbanded due to in-fighting and lack of teamwork.

=== Film ===
A Gotham City Sirens film entered development as part of the DC Extended Universe (DCEU) as a spin-off of Suicide Squad (2016) with David Ayer directing and set to feature Harley Quinn, Catwoman, and Poison Ivy. However, the film was delayed, replaced with Birds of Prey, and eventually cancelled.
