= Scudder Klyce =

American philosopher, scientist, and naval officer (1879–1933)

Scudder Klyce (November 7, 1879 in Friendship, Tennessee – January 28, 1933 in Winchester, Massachusetts) was an American philosopher, scientist and naval officer. He is known for his work, Universe, which attempted to accumulate the knowledge of mankind into a single book to collect and deliver a solution for all the problems of humanity.

== Life ==
Klyce studied at the University of Arkansas. In his youth, he served in the Spanish–American War, and participated in the Philippine campaign. In 1902 he graduated from the U.S. Naval Academy in Annapolis, Maryland, where he later filed a post-graduate study for engineering. In 1908 he married Etheldreda Hovey († 1917). They had one son, Stephen Klyce. His second, (1917) closed marriage was with Laura Tilden Kent. They had two children, William and Dorothy Klyce Klyce.

His service in the Navy involved protecting shipping interests during the Honduras–Nicaragua War of 1907. On May 2, 1907, Klyce was promoted to Commander. On February 15, 1912, he resigned to devote himself to the study of the foundations of science ( "investigation of foundations of science").

== Estate ==
Klyce's estate was passed by his widow to the Library of Congress in 1933, where it is still available. It includes 16 boxes with 4800 items and is located in the Manuscript Division at the Library of Congress. The deposit includes published and unpublished scripts, magazine articles, and Klyce correspondence with contemporaries such as Robert Daniel Carmichael, James McKeen Cattell, Clarence Day, John Dewey, Waldo Frank, Dorothy Canfield Fisher, David Starr Jordan, Robert Andrews Taylor, Theodore William Richards, William Emerson Ritter and Upton Sinclair. Klyce is also known to have corresponded with Frederick W. Taylor.

== Klyce's philosophical work ==
Universe is Klyce's main work which he self-published in 1921.

Universe claims to solve all issues related to the "why, how and what to solve" in science, religion, and philosophy. Issues with which the book is involved include astronomy, light, electricity, heat, chemicals, the spiritual union of the humanities; which unzutreffendheit Newton's laws of biology, psychology, the correlation between ethics and economics, sociology, the various theories of language in relation to physics, cosmology, energy, matter.

Largely obscure after its publication, despite the inclusion of an introduction by popular American philosopher John Dewey, Universe managed to capture brief notability in 1989. In that year, Alan Grant, a regular author of Detective Comics for DC Comics, made reference to Universe within the comic book. In the story, the character Anarky, a creation of Grant's, drew heavy influence from Klyce, and the author made some of Klyce's philosophy a part of Anarky's characteristics. In another reference, Grant wrote a book (Batman: The Stone King) in which Batman owns a personally signed edition with notes, but exchanges it with Scarecrow for some information.

Klyce's second work, Sins of Science was published 1925. In it, Klyce says that the basics of science and religion should be separated. His chief concern of the book is to show how a man should be able to obtain happiness and success.

== Works ==
- Universe, 1921. (with three discharges of David Starr Jordan, John Dewey and Morris Llewellyn Cooke) (available online at https://archive.org/details/cu31924029066343 )
- Sins of Science, 1925.
- Dewey's Suppressed Psychology, 1928. (Correspondence with John Dewey)
- Outline of Basic Mathematics, 1932
