= General Records =

Small American record label

General Records was a small American record label during the late 1930s and early 1940s. Its most notable releases are piano solos recorded by Jelly Roll Morton in December 1939 late in his career.

== History ==
Established around 1939, General Records was a division of Consolidated Records, Inc., of New York City. The label was owned by pioneering sound engineer Hazard E. Reeves, of Reeves Sound Studios (1939–1944) in Manhattan.

The audio fidelity is above average for the era, and most General discs were pressed in good quality shellac, although the quality declined as good shellac became scarce with the start of World War II.

The most famous General Records are a series of recordings by Jelly Roll Morton. The recording sessions in December 1939 and January 1940 were the last in Morton's career.

In 1946 Milt Gabler of Commodore Records purchased the stock, masters and rights of General Records when the company went out of production. Morton's solo piano album, New Orleans Memories, and his "Tavern Tunes" series (recorded with the Morton Sextet and the Morton Seven) were included in the purchase. The out-of-print recordings were re-released on the Commodore label.

"Recorded late in his career, the General records caught Jelly Roll at perhaps the peak of his ability, and many of these records, particularly Mamie's Blues and Don't You Leave Me Here, are regarded as blues classics," " wrote The Jazz Record in August 1946. "Half the series are straight old ragtime piano, which ties in nicely with the present day revival of interest in old piano rags."

== Select discography ==
The most notable General Records releases were piano solos by Jelly Roll Morton. General Records 4001–4005 were reissued by Commodore Records in August 1946 in a set titled New Orleans Memories.

- General 4001
  Jelly Roll Morton
  "Mamie's Blues" (Jelly Roll Morton), recorded in New York, December 16, 1939
  "Original Piano Rags" (Scott Joplin), recorded in New York, December 16, 1939
- General 4002
  Jelly Roll Morton
  "Michigan Water Blues" (Clarence Williams), recorded in New York, December 18, 1939
  "The Naked Dance" (Jelly Roll Morton), recorded in New York, December 14, 1939
- General 4003
  Jelly Roll Morton
  "Buddy Bolden's Blues" (Traditional), recorded in New York, December 16, 1939
  "The Crave" (Jelly Roll Morton), recorded in New York, December 14, 1939
- General 4004
  Jelly Roll Morton
  "Winin' Boy Blues" (Jelly Roll Morton), recorded in New York, December 14, 1939
  "Mister Joe" (Jelly Roll Morton), recorded in New York, December 14, 1939
- General 4005
  Jelly Roll Morton
  "Don't You Leave Me Here" (Jelly Roll Morton), recorded in New York, December 16, 1939
  "King Porter Stomp" (Jelly Roll Morton), recorded in New York, December 14, 1939

== See also ==
- List of record labels
