= Simon Hurt =

Doctor Hurt
- Simon Hurt as depicted in Batman and Robin #14 (October 2010). Art by Frank Quitely.

Publication information
- Publisher: DC Comics
- First appearance: Unnamed: Batman #156 (June 1963); As Simon Hurt: Batman #673 (June 2008)
- Created by: Sheldon Moldoff (writer); Charles Paris (artist); 2008 revision by Grant Morrison

In-story information
- Alter ego: Simon Hurt
- Species: Human
- Team affiliations: Black Glove; Club of Villains; Religion of Crime
- Notable aliases: The Hole in Things, Mangrove Pierce, Dr. Hurt, El Penitente, Thomas Wayne, Barbatos
- Abilities: Possible immortality Master of psychology Highly intelligent Expert strategist and tactician

Dr. Simon Hurt, commonly known simply as Doctor Hurt, is a fictional character who appears in American comic books published by DC Comics. First appearing as an unnamed character in Batman #156 (June 1963), the character was retroactively revived in 2008 by writer Grant Morrison and established as Thomas Wayne, a distant relative of Bruce Wayne (the alter-ego of Batman) and his father Thomas Wayne.

== Publication history ==
Visually, Doctor Hurt is based on an unnamed scientist who first appeared in Batman #156 (June 1963), in a story titled "Robin Dies at Dawn". In that story, Batman participated in an experiment for NASA that caused him to hallucinate that Robin (Dick Grayson) was in constant danger; the story itself is referenced many times in Morrison's run on Batman. The character made behind-the-scenes appearances throughout Morrison's run before actually appearing fully in the first chapter of "Batman R.I.P."

The character was first called "Doctor Simon Hurt" in Batman #674. He is a brilliant psychologist whose true identity and nature is an enigma; over the course of Morrison's run he has been strongly implied at times to be the devil, the demon Barbatos, a supernaturally-empowered ancestor of Bruce Wayne, Bruce Wayne's long-lost evil twin brother, Bruce Wayne's father, an instrument of Darkseid, and perhaps even Darkseid himself. Hurt is dedicated to completely destroying Batman in body, mind, and soul, and replacing him with a corrupted, evil counterpart.

Hurt led both the Black Glove and the Club of Villains against Batman in "Batman R.I.P." Hurt was the main antagonist of Morrison's run on Batman titles from 2007 to 2011, appearing in Batman, The Return of Bruce Wayne, and Batman and Robin, as well as behind-the-scenes in Final Crisis.

== Fictional character biography ==
A psychiatrist, Simon Hurt is involved in a program which creates three "replacement Batmen" with the participation of the Gotham City Police Department. Sometime after the replacements are trained, Hurt is hired by the Defense Department to oversee an isolation experiment. During this process, he gives Batman a post-hypnotic trigger connected to the phrase "Zur-En-Arrh". Going over his notes on Batman's psychology, Hurt realizes that Batman was "powered by tragedy" and set about traumatizing the three replacements, ostensibly to make them better crimefighters.

Many years later, Hurt is working with the Black Glove when they decided to target Batman and his allies. Their first attack consists of character assassination on the Wayne family, by spreading information to suggest that Thomas Wayne somehow survived his murder by Joe Chill. Using the Zur-En-Arrh trigger in conjunction with drugs, Hurt sends the dazed and confused Bruce Wayne onto the streets of Gotham City with no memory.

Batman survives thanks to his years of preparation, culminating in a confrontation with Hurt on Arkham Asylum's roof. He accuses Hurt of being Mangrove Pierce, an actor, acquaintance, and occasional impersonator of Thomas. However, Hurt claims to have been a separate person from Pierce and was responsible for his death.

Hurt is presumed dead after a helicopter explosion, but survives and reappears six months later in Mexico, disguised as drug lord El Penitente. With Joker working as an unreliable ally, Hurt releases an airborne drug into Gotham City with the intention of driving the city mad, subsequently making a public return as Thomas with the intention of setting up his headquarters in the Batcave. Hurt shoots Dick Grayson in the head and attempts to force Damian Wayne to swear allegiance to him to save Dick's life.

Hurt is revealed to be Thomas Wayne, a distant relative of the Wayne family who originates from the 17th century and prolonged his life through a series of occult rituals. Having escaped to a graveyard, Hurt is confronted and defeated by the Joker when he slips on a banana peel and breaks his neck. The Joker doses Hurt with Joker venom and buries him alive, claiming that he proved to be a disappointment as a "new" arch-enemy. It is revealed that Dick has survived the injuries, despite Hurt's intent to render him comatose and nearly brain dead. Joker claims that he has "taken care" of Hurt, but Bruce is not willing to believe that Hurt is dead.

Hurt appears in the storyline Convergence, where a group of pre-Flashpoint Batman villains, including Riddler and Professor Pyg, attempt to confront the Batman of Earth-Two (a version of Thomas Wayne). Hurt is eventually killed when Batman blows himself up as a delaying tactic.

=== DC Rebirth ===
In 2016, DC Comics implemented a relaunch of its books called "DC Rebirth", which restored its continuity to a form much as it was prior to The New 52 reboot. Hurt is depicted as deriving his immortality from the Hyper-Adapter that is fused to him. Hurt recruits Professor Pyg and has him create Dollotrons of Robin and Nightwing, one of which becomes known as Deathwing. Deathwing brings him Robin, who he plans to kill at dawn. Hurt is apparently killed when Deathwing stabs him, but manages to stab Deathwing in return.

== Character overview ==
Hurt claims to be Thomas Wayne, the name being shared with a devil-worshiping ancestor back in the 18th century. Batman initially suspects him to be the actor Mangrove Pierce, dismissing the belief of the third replacement Batman and the Joker that Hurt is the devil; Hurt alludes to this possibility several times using metaphor only, claiming "I am the hole in things..."the enemy", "the piece that can never fit, there since the beginning", all cryptic statements that relate to the mythology of a demonic figure. Near the end of "Batman R.I.P.", however, Batman begins to wonder whether Hurt really is the devil. Batman states that Darkseid is attempting to "incarnate" in Hurt.

Following numerous hints and plot threads throughout Batman and Robin and Batman: The Return of Bruce Wayne, the mystery of Hurt's identity was seemingly resolved in Batman and Robin #16, in which he was identified as a devil-worshipping ancestor of Bruce Wayne's named Thomas Wayne (first mentioned in Batman and Robin #10 and appearing in Batman: The Return of Bruce Wayne #4). The issue reveals that, centuries beforehand, Hurt attempted to summon the demon Barbatos, but instead was confronted by the Hyper-Adapter, a hyper-dimensional creature tasked by Darkseid with overseeing Batman's voyage through history after he was struck by the villain's Omega Effect. Corrupted — or perhaps possessed — by the Hyper-Adapter's energies, this Thomas Wayne became extremely long-lived (potentially immortal), living until the present day, when he was taken in by Batman's parents, Thomas and Martha Wayne. Wishing to help him, the Waynes send him to Willowood Asylum, a reference to a pre-Crisis story in which Bruce had a mentally damaged brother who was sent to the same facility. This was previously referenced in Morrison's Batman #702, which showed the asylum as the same hospital to which Thomas Wayne Jr. was sent. Batman and Dick Grayson conclude this reading of events to be the truth, and impartial flashbacks in the issue appear to confirm it as accurate, though the insane Hurt continues to claim throughout the issue that he is both Thomas Wayne and the devil. However, since Hurt was already an adult man when the Waynes met him, it seems unlikely that they would have claimed him to be their son, Thomas Jr. As Bruce Wayne travels through time as a result of the Omega Effect, Hurt is seen as a doctor in Willowood, rather than a patient. Grant Morrison explained the ambiguity during an interview in Wizard Magazine:

There's a doctor who's got some good lines in the original story Robin Dies At Dawn, and he's never named. I thought, "What if he's a bad guy?" That became Dr. Hurt. I thought, "Wow...there was a guy who had access to Batman's psychology for 10 days. That's my villain!" I also thought it was a way to sort of reinvigorate those old stories, as a service to DC, to sell some more of the older books and collections.

The minute I say who he is...it will stop people talking. I was trying to do a definitive Batman story. Batman's stories tend to put Batman against a diabolical mastermind. I thought, "Who's the ultimate diabolical mastermind?" This is a story about Batman's Black Casebook which is all the mysterious cases, the ones that are supernatural or bizarre. So for me, this is the ultimate supernatural Batman story. There are clues, there are places in fact, where they actually state who's he up against in the story. But people don't want to accept the supernatural explanation. But yes: This is the story of how Batman cheats The Devil.

— Grant Morrison, "Batman: RIP Director's Commentary", Wizard #211 (May 2009)

== Other versions ==
Simon Hurt appears in "Batman in Bethlehem", which depicts an alternate future where Damian Wayne became Batman. Hurt, having become a personal advisor to the President of the United States, convinces the president to destroy Gotham City with a nuclear weapon.

== See also ==
- List of Batman family enemies
