= General (DC Comics) =

- An older version of The General, as depicted in Robin #17, art by Freddie Williams II.

Publication information
- Publisher: DC Comics
- First appearance: Detective Comics #654 (Dec. 1992)
- Created by: Chuck Dixon (writer); Michael Netzer (artist)

In-story information
- Alter ego: Ulysses Hadrian Armstrong
- Notable aliases: Anarky, Red Robin
- Abilities: Military tactician; Skilled hand-to-hand combatant; Skilled in firearms and explosives

General (Ulysses Hadrian Armstrong) is a fictional character appearing in American comic books published by DC Comics. Created by Chuck Dixon as an adversary of Batman, the character first appeared in Detective Comics #654, published in December 1992. Named for the character's gimmick for military strategy and prowess with small arms, stories involving the character often include historic military references and themes.

Initially portrayed as a dangerously psychopathic, murderous child, the tone of the General was changed by Dixon himself for later appearances. Return appearances featured the character in issues of Robin during the mid-1990s, in which Dixon portrayed the character as pompous and childish, rather than maliciously insane. Although still occasionally dangerous and lethal, the graphic violence of the character's criminal behavior was also toned down.

The character experienced a prolonged period of obscurity after 1997, lasting over ten years, until Fabian Nicieza chose to revamp the character for the concluding story arc of the Robin comic book series in the final months of 2008. With Nicieza's intention being to establish the character as an archenemy for Tim Drake, the General was once again characterized as a major threat in the "Batman family" pantheon of villains. Recast as a new version of another obscure character, Anarky, Armstrong was also re-characterized with a new "Anarky" themed costume.

== Publication history ==
=== Creation and first appearance ===
The General was created by Chuck Dixon in 1992. Ulysses Hadrian Armstrong is a psychotic child with the mind of a military genius. Bored with his life at a military school, he reads books about military history. Ulysses later escapes his school, burning down the school and killing everyone inside; these are acts of arson and mass murder, committed to avoid alerting authorities to his escape. He goes to Gotham City to recruit small-time gang members into a makeshift "army". Utilizing military skills, Armstrong's reputation gains him the nickname "the General". Continuing a campaign to become a powerful crime boss of Gotham, the General conquers and absorbs enemy gangs into a sizable force. Laying siege to a police station with the intent of capturing the storage room full of guns and illegal drugs, with which to fund future activities, he is confronted by Batman. Once captured by Batman, the General's undisciplined army scatters in fear, and the General himself is sent to a youth detention center.

=== Mid 1990s appearances in Robin ===
Between 1995 and 1997, the General appeared in a total of three story arcs in issues of the Robin comic book series.

The General manipulated delusional homeless derelict, Julie Caesar, who believed himself to be the historical Julius Caesar.

The General teamed up with Toyman, but this partnership ended in mutual betrayal.

The General was given control as commander-in-chief of a country's military.

=== 2008 revamp as "Anarky" ===
The costume design for the new Ulysses H. Armstrong version of Anarky, as depicted on promotional art for Robin #182, part of the "Faces of Evil" event, art by Brian Stelfreeze.

The General appeared at the end of 2008 in Robin #177, the "Search for a Hero" storyline that deals with the Batman R.I.P. aftermath, Battle for the Cowl. Within the storyline, he is revealed to be disguised as Red Robin.

After a very long absence, the General has returned to Gotham City, having aged several years, grown several feet and has become a more formidable hand-to-hand combatant. He physically appears closer in age to Robin and Spoiler. He has for reasons yet unknown been hired by Spoiler to gather information about the Gang Wars, and find a possible solution to them. He continues to hold a grudge against Robin and betrays Spoiler. Spoiler survives a gunshot to the shoulder, and then distracts him long enough to get the drop on him and escape.

He comes into possession of the Red Robin costume worn by Jason Todd, and uses it as part of a campaign of psychological warfare against Tim Drake. More formidable than ever, he is revealed to be holding Lonnie Machin hostage and to have commandeered the latter's identity as Anarky. Where Machin's approach as Anarky had been to cause social change, Armstrong's approach bordered more on psychotic and meaningless acts of chaos and destruction.

Armstrong manages to catch Robin in his warehouse, yet Robin escapes through unknown means, but not without sustaining serious burns to his head. Soon after, a final confrontation ensues, where Anarky attempts to kill all of Gotham City's gangs, so as to create more violence. The combined efforts of Robin, Spoiler, Commissioner Gordon, Officer Harper and the Gotham gangs results in Armstrong's defeat, but not without a price. In order to take the edge off of Armstrong, Robin asked Officer Harper to bring the Armstrong family to confront Ulysses. While the action worked, Armstrong caused a bomb to explode, killing his brother and sister in the blast. Armstrong blames Robin for their deaths.

=== Rebirth ===
Ulysses returns to continuity after Flashpoint event during the Detective Comics storyline "Rise of the Batmen", a part of DC's Rebirth relaunch. This version of the character is a teenage genius who works for a military organization known as The Colony, which models itself after Batman and his methods. Ulysses' job within the Colony is to reverse engineer Batman's equipment, as well as observe the Bat-Family. This version of the character is shown to be cheerful yet sociopathic, gleefully offering to show Batman footage of the more gruesome missions that the Colony has undertaken.

== Skills and resources ==
=== Military strategy and deception ===
The General is a military and strategic genius. He has vast knowledge of military history, and his careful planning are what earned him the respect of his henchmen. Sometimes he fools adults into false senses of security in order to attack them and also tricks adults into letting him control armies.

=== Armed and unarmed combat ===
Growing up, he gains a muscular build and a lesser degree of martial arts knowledge, not nearly enough to best seasoned fighters like Robin, but quite formidable nevertheless. He retains his penchant for historical weapons, and in his brief stint as the Red Robin he is shown using a Mauser as his sidearm of preference.

=== Costumes ===
He likes to play dress up, changing several costumes and identities in his career. Starting from a simple military themed garb, he then adopted the Red Robin suit, discarded from a dimension hopping Jason Todd, using the Bat-Family themed identity to pave off for his return as the new Anarchy.

As Anarchy he uses a modified version of the original Anarky suit, adapted to fit his broader and sturdier physical build and with an angrier mask.

=== Explosives expertise ===
Both as Red Robin and as Anarky, Armstrong is shown able to create and set complex explosive traps, drawing Tim Drake in a mined warehouse and managing to wound him seriously. As Anarky he wears a special cane with a remote-controlled trigger, making him able to detonate explosives carefully hidden through the battlefield.

== Other versions ==
Legends of the Dark Knight #55–57, set in the near-future, features an adult Ulysses Armstrong as one of a number of crime bosses contacted by Vigil, Inc., a corrupt private police force which is actually a protection racket for criminals. This adult version of the General wears modern military gear, rather than the historic costumes of his younger self, and surrounds himself with women who have general's stars tattooed on their foreheads.

== In other media ==
The General was considered to appear in The New Batman Adventures, with producer Paul Dini stating "maybe" when asked about the character's chances of appearing. Ultimately, the General did not feature in the series.

== See also ==
- List of Batman family enemies
- List of comic book supervillains
- List of DC Comics characters
