= Batman: Battle for the Cowl =

2009 Batman comic book story arc

- Cover of the trade paperback of Batman: Battle for the Cowl story arc, art by Tony Daniel.

Publication information
- Publisher: DC Comics
- Schedule: Monthly
- Format: Limited series
- Genre: Superhero
- Publication date: March – May 2009
- No. of issues: 3
- Main characters: Dick Grayson; Jason Todd; Tim Drake; Damian Wayne; Black Mask; Batman Family; Club of Heroes

Creative team
- Written by: Tony Daniel
- Penciller: Tony Daniel
- Inker: Sandu Florea
- Letterer: Jared Fletcher
- Colorist: Ian Hannin
- Editor(s): Mike Marts; Janelle Siegel

Collected editions
- Battle for the Cowl: ISBN 1-4012-2416-4
- Battle for the Cowl Companion: ISBN 1-4012-2495-4

"Batman: Battle for the Cowl" is a 2009 comic book storyline published by the comic book publishing company DC Comics, consisting of an eponymous, three-issue miniseries written and penciled by Tony Daniel, as well as a number of tie-in books. The central story details the chaos in Gotham City following the "Batman R.I.P." and "Final Crisis" story arcs, due to Batman's absence. His disappearance is caused by the character's apparent death at the hands of Darkseid in Final Crisis, which causes dissension in the ranks of his allies and enemies who fight for the right to become the new Batman.

== Publication history ==
While the core story is presented as self-contained within the limited series, DC has published a group of related stories in various one-shot issues and limited series.

The comic titles Nightwing, Robin, and Birds of Prey were cancelled and Batman and Detective Comics went on hiatus for three months beginning in March 2009. The Battle for the Cowl plot focuses on the aftermath of Final Crisis and Batman: R.I.P. and the battle for Gotham.

Other publications tied into this storyline are a three-part Oracle miniseries, a three-part Azrael miniseries, and two bookends titled Gotham Gazette that encompass the changes in all of those series. In addition, DC published five one-shots focusing on key characters in subsequent story lines featuring the Man-Bat, Commissioner Gordon, the Network, the Underground and Arkham Asylum.

At New York Comic Con 2009, DC Comics' creative personnel announced the launch of several new series to coincide with the new Batman and Robin adjusting to Gotham City's altered status quo.

== Plot summary ==
=== Prelude ===
The prelude to the story begins with Grant Morrison's Batman and Son, which starts off with the Joker being shot by a man pretending to be Batman. Batman then realizes that since his return after a one year absence, he has eliminated all supercrime in the city. Talia al Ghul then wrests the Man-Bat formula from Kirk Langstrom, leading to Batman confronting Talia. Talia reveals that Bruce is the father of her son, named Damian Wayne. Damian then tries to replace Tim Drake as Robin. After a confrontation with Talia on a boat ends with Talia and Damian getting hit by a torpedo, Bruce simply leaves. Damian then returns to Bruce in The Resurrection of Ra's al Ghul, though Ra's's resurrection cannot be stopped, Damian learns about the rest of Bruce Wayne's sons. In Batman R.I.P, Bruce confronts the Black Glove and attacks Simon Hurt in a helicopter that explodes. Bruce survives and spends some time looking for Hurt, but is called away by Superman to investigate the death of Orion. In Final Crisis, Bruce is captured by Granny Goodness and cloned by Darkseid's minions. Batman ultimately escapes, his clone commits suicide, and Bruce takes the bullet used to kill Orion and shoots Darkseid with it. Darkseid simultaneously hits Bruce with the Omega Sanction, sending him to the past. Superman takes Bruce's body, actually that of Bruce's clone, to Nightwing. Chaos breaks out in Gotham as Batman is no longer operational and Dick refuses to become Batman because Bruce told him not to in his will.

=== Central storyline ===
Due to his involvement in Hurt's plan to kill Batman, Michael Lane believes himself to be responsible for the crime and trauma brought to Gotham City. He confesses this to his priest who takes him in to the Order of Purity to become the next Azrael. In his first act as Azrael, Lane defends the properties of the Azrael suit from Talia al Ghul, in turn preventing her from giving it to Damian Wayne. Azrael then manages to not only defeat Talia, but also retrieve the Sword of Salvation from her. Azrael is then attacked by Nightwing, believing him to be responsible for the death of a police official. Azrael manages to convince Nightwing that he is not responsible for the murder.

Nightwing becomes as cold as Bruce had. Despite Tim's requests, he refuses to take up the mantle of the Bat. This leads to an impostor taking up the mantle, but this one uses brute force and shoots his victims to death. Black Mask takes control of Arkham's inmates with implants that will kill them if they do not obey him. Among his recruits are Scarecrow, Jane Doe, Firefly, Poison Ivy, Killer Croc, and Victor Zsasz.

After Damian is attacked by Killer Croc, Nightwing rescues him, but is in turn attacked by the imposter Batman, Jason Todd. When Damian attempts to prove himself to Dick by attacking Jason, he is shot by the latter and severely wounded, saved only by Alfred. This leads to Tim Drake assuming the mantle of Batman and tracking Jason to the Batcave. There he too is attacked and severely wounded by Jason, who awaits the arrival of Nightwing.

Damian is then sent by Alfred to find and rescue Tim, though to make sure that he does not get further injured, he is sent with Squire. The two of them rescue Tim together. Meanwhile, Dick enters an all out brawl with Jason which leads to a fight on top of Gotham's sky train system. Dick manages to defeat Jason, but the latter falls into Gotham River telling Dick that they will meet again. Dick then returns to the Batcave and assumes the mantle of Batman.

== Checklist ==
=== Main books ===
- Batman: Battle for the Cowl #1-3
- Battle for the Cowl: Commissioner Gordon (written by Royal McGraw, with art by Tom Mandrake, May 2009)
- Gotham Gazette: Batman Dead? (May 2009)
- Azrael: Death's Dark Knight #1-3 (written by Fabian Nicieza, with art by Frazer Irving, May - July 2009)
- Oracle: The Cure #1-3 (May - July 2009)
- Battle for the Cowl: Arkham Asylum (June 2009)
- Battle for the Cowl: The Underground (June 2009)
- Battle for the Cowl: Man-Bat (June 2009)
- Battle for the Cowl: The Network (July 2009)
- Gotham Gazette: Batman Alive? (July 2009)
- Secret Six #9 (July 2009)
- Batman #687 (August 2009) - aftermath, with the logo of Batman: Reborn story-arc in the cover

=== Aftermath ===
- Detective Comics #854–863 (written by Greg Rucka and penciled by J. H. Williams III). It follows the adventures of Batwoman along with a Question co-feature.
- Batman #687–713 (written by Judd Winick and penciled by Ed Benes on the first issue, Mark Bagley on the next four and Tony Daniel after that)
- Batman and Robin #1-26 (written by Grant Morrison and penciled by Frank Quitely). This series focuses on Dick Grayson and Damian Wayne as a light-hearted and spontaneous Batman and brooding and violent Robin respectively. The book contains an overarching story split across several smaller stories.
- Red Robin #1-26 (written by Christopher Yost and penciled by Ramon Bachs). The story revolves around Tim Drake's quest to find Bruce Wayne. The title follows his journey throughout the DCU and is divided into mini-arcs under one major story. The first four issue arc is titled "The Grail".
- Batman: Streets of Gotham #1-21 (written by Paul Dini and penciled by Dustin Nguyen) focuses on the GCPD, as well as the Gotham Underground. It stars the new Batman. Starting with issue #1, Manhunter is attached in a co-feature.
- Gotham City Sirens #1-26 (written by Paul Dini and penciled by Guillem March) focuses on female rogues the Catwoman, Poison Ivy and Harley Quinn.
- Superman/Batman #76 looks at Superman's reaction to Dick Grayson assuming the role of Batman; initially angry at this perceived 'disrespect' to his friend's memory (regarding it as essentially Dick wearing Bruce's skin as Batman was the true identity), a talk with Wonder Woman helps Superman realise that he is simply lashing out over his grief at his friend's loss, and he later acknowledges Dick as the new Batman.

== Collected editions ==
The series and its secondary titles are being collected into four individual trade paperbacks:

- Battle for the Cowl (160 pages, hardcover, November 2009, ISBN 1-4012-2416-4) - collects the three issues of the story and the two issues of Gotham Gazette
- Battle for the Cowl Companion (128 pages, softcover, November 2009, ISBN 1-4012-2495-4) - collects the five one-shots
- Azrael: Death's Dark Knight (144 pages, softcover, September 2010, ISBN 1-4012-2707-4) - collects the three issues
- Oracle: The Cure (March 2010, ISBN 1-4012-2603-5) - collects the three issues and Birds of Prey #126-127 (the last two issues of (vol. 1) of this comic book series)
