= Red Robin (comic book) =

American comic book series

- Variant incentive cover for Red Robin #1, art by J. G. Jones.

Publication information
- Publisher: DC Comics
- Schedule: Monthly
- Format: Ongoing series
- Genre: Superhero
- Publication date: August 2009 – August 2011
- No. of issues: 26
- Main character: Tim Drake

Creative team
- Created by: Chris Yost; Ramon Bachs
- Written by: Chris Yost; Fabian Nicieza
- Artist(s): Ramon Bachs; Marcus To
- Letterer: Sal Cipriano
- Colorist: Guy Major
- Editor(s): Mike Marts; Janelle Siegel

Red Robin is an American comic book ongoing series published by the comic book publishing company DC Comics that was written by Chris Yost, with art by Ramon Bachs, featuring Batman's former accomplice, Robin (Tim Drake). The debut of the series follows the events of Batman R.I.P., Final Crisis, and Battle for the Cowl in which the original Batman, Bruce Wayne, apparently died at the hands of DC Comics villain Darkseid. Of all the characters in the so-called "Bat-family", Drake (now using his legal name, Tim Wayne) is the only one who believes Bruce Wayne is still alive and leaves Gotham City to begin a global search for evidence supporting his theory and hope.

== Characters ==
DC Comics Batman line editor Mike Marts revealed characters that appear in Red Robin by showing his "wall" of character thumbnails underneath the various Batman titles. Characters who appear in Red Robin other than Tim Drake include Gotham City reporter Vicki Vale and one of Bruce Wayne's longtime enemies, Ra's al Ghul.

=== Azrael ===
In October 2010, Red Robin tied in indirectly to an Azrael comic by using Ra's al Ghul, who tested those involved with Bruce Wayne to become his ultimate warrior.

Red Robin artist Ramon Bachs left Red Robin to take on Azrael with Fabian Nicieza, in turn, he finished "The Grail" and gave Marcus his debut in DC to draw the next four-issue arc "Council of Spiders".

Despite the backstories of both comics relying heavily on the League of Assassins and both stories converging at times, the initial run of Batman: Reborn did not have an official tie-in between the two comics. The two eventually crossed-over in the overarching "Gotham Shall Be Judged" storyline when Red Robin would have faced Azrael's Angels of Death.

== Plot ==
=== The Grail ===
With Bruce Wayne's apparent death, Tim Drake takes on the costumed identity of Red Robin. He is convinced that Bruce Wayne is alive, and sets out to locate him.

Drake travels around the world, looking for clues as to Bruce Wayne's location. After rescuing a hostage, he retires to his hotel room, frustrated. A flashback is shown of Drake leaving Wayne Manor after losing the Robin mantle to Damian Wayne. Outside his window, Z, Owens, and Prudence watch and aim at him with a sniper rifle. The three assassins are in league with Ra's al Ghul, who gives the order to assassinate Drake.

The hotel room explodes from the shot, but Red Robin (Drake) appears and attacks the three. Drake demonstrates his new fighting style and deduces the identities of the assassins before they disappear. Soon after, Red Robin comes into contact with Ra's al Ghul, who is interested to learn what has happened to Bruce Wayne. Red Robin #3 begins when Drake attempts to steal what appears to be a fossilized Batarang while consulting with Ra's. Another flashback is shown, with Drake standing in front of Bruce Wayne's grave when Wonder Girl approaches to console him and persuade him to return home. Tim, however, deduces that Dick Grayson sent her to check on him and makes her leave him alone.

The last issue of the first arc alternates between Red Robin and Batman fighting each other and Drake's discovery of Bruce Wayne's cave painting at the end of Final Crisis. At the end of the first arc, Red Robin is stabbed by a villain named the Widower, leaving him and Prudence for dead and setting the stage for the second story arc.

=== Council of Spiders ===
The second story arc, Council of Spiders, deals with Red Robin having to face off against the Council of Spiders, a group of assassins who have made it their goal to destroy the League of Assassins. Red Robin makes a shaky alliance with the League, and after they have dealt with the council, he destroys the League's global computer system, earning the ire of Ra's al Ghul.

=== Collision ===
The third story arc, entitled Collision, sees Red Robin enlisting the help of the new Batman (Dick Grayson), Robin (Damian Wayne), and Batgirl (Stephanie Brown), to stop Ra's al Ghul from destroying the Wayne Family legacy, in which Drake succeeds. Drake is nearly killed by Ra's when he confronts him, who, after seeing that his plan has failed, addresses Red Robin as "detective", a title of respect that he had reserved for Bruce Wayne alone. Ra's throws Red Robin off a building, but Red Robin is saved by the timely arrival of Dick Grayson as Batman.

=== The Hit List ===
The next story arc, entitled The Hit List, sees Red Robin working alongside the new Batman and Robin to fight crime in Gotham, but he does it his way. He sets up a list of people he suspects are the biggest threats on both sides. This causes even more tension in the relationship between him and the new Robin. He is seen taking down a new gang leader named Lynx. The reporter Vicky Vale is on his toes as Tim Drake seems to know what the Bat-families' real identities are. He works hard to fake being shot and now being unable to walk properly simply to put her off his trail. He also has a brush with Anarky and some other low-class villains. He also visits Cassandra Cain. This is also an opening to Batman Inc. showing his involvement in it.

=== Gotham Shall Be Judged ===
Following the invasion of Gotham City via Azrael and his Angels of Death, Red Robin teams up with the new Batman, Dick Grayson to fight against Azrael. Drake is tested by Azrael to see if he can save the lives of innocents, a test which he, like Dick, ends up failing. In the end, it is revealed that in revenge for destroying the base of the League of Assassins, Ra's al Ghul was manipulating Azrael to get him to face off with Red Robin.

Despite the Azrael and Red Robin books heavily referencing each other during Batman: Reborn (even having the same backplot involving the League of Assassins), it was not until near the end of the latter's comic that they officially tied in, and the former's was already ended.

== Outfit ==
Red Robin's outfit from comics #1-12 was a black cape and cowl over a red shirt with two bands running diagonally across his chest, containing his symbol in the middle. His belt ran over his shirt and he had black gloves on. He also wore long black pants with black boots. At the end of Red Robin #12, Alfred made some slight changes to his outfit to make it more his own. Alfred updated the gloves and boots and gave him a cape he could glide with alongside a new belt. He also took the ends of the shirt off. After DC Comics rebooted the main universe in 2011, Tim Drake became the leader of the Teen Titans. His symbol is now on his left shoulder, and he has a wing-like cape to help him glide. He now wears a domino mask instead of a cowl.

== Collected editions ==
Title	Material collected	Published date	ISBN
Red Robin: The Grail	Red Robin #1-5	May 2010	ISBN 978-1-4012-2619-0
Red Robin: Collision	Red Robin #6-12, Batgirl (vol. 3) #8	September 2010	ISBN 978-1-4012-2883-5
Red Robin: The Hit List	Red Robin #13-17	June 2011	ISBN 978-1-4012-3165-1
Red Robin: Seven Days of Death	Red Robin #18-21, 23-26, Teen Titans (vol. 3) #92	March 2012	ISBN 978-1-4012-3364-8
Batman: Gotham Shall Be Judged	Red Robin #22 and Azrael (vol. 2) #14-18, Batman #708-709, Gotham City Sirens #22	April 2012	ISBN 978-1-4012-3378-5

== See also ==
- Batman: Reborn
