= Batman R.I.P. =

2008 story arc in Batman comic book series

- Cover of Batman #676, the first issue of the arc, art by Alex Ross.

Publication information
- Publisher: DC Comics
- Publication date: May – November 2008
- Main characters: Batman; Dr. Hurt; Black Glove; Joker; Club of Villains

Creative team
- Written by: Grant Morrison
- Artist: Tony Daniel

Collected editions
- Hardcover: ISBN 1401220908
- Trade Paperback: ISBN 1401225764
- Unwrapped: ISBN 1401261892
- Absolute Edition: ISBN 1799507602

"Batman R.I.P." is an American comic book story arc published in Batman #676–681 by DC Comics. Written by Grant Morrison, penciled by Tony Daniel, and with covers by Alex Ross, the story pits the superhero Batman against the Black Glove organization as they attempt to destroy everything that he stands for. It has a number of tie-ins in other DC Comics titles describing events not told in the main story.

== Plot ==
=== The Batman of Zur-en-arrh ===
The story begins with Batman and Robin perched onto a gothic building lit by lightning, where the former defiantly proclaims, "Batman and Robin will never die!". Events then flash back to Gotham City six months earlier, where Simon Hurt announces Black Glove's next venture: the destruction of Batman.

Bruce Wayne is dating Jezebel Jet, a model who is very influential in her home country. Jezebel discovers Bruce was Batman relatively early in their relationship, and the revelation makes the relationship easier for Bruce to handle. He lets Jezebel so deep into his life that he even introduces her to the Batcave. Meanwhile, Black Glove member Le Bossu contacts the Joker in Arkham Asylum and offers him a role in their assault on Batman.

Jezebel tries to convince Batman that he is simply living a life he has fabricated in his own head as a child to cope with the death of his parents. This suggestion begins to affect Batman's already-strained psyche, and he passes out when Jezebel says aloud a word that was on all the Bat-computer's screens: Zur-En-Arrh. As he passes out, Hurt and minions of his diabolical club, Black Glove, infiltrate the Batcave. They drug Batman, beat Alfred, and wreak havoc upon the cave.

When Bruce Wayne is seen next, he wakes up in a pile of garbage with no memory of himself. He meets a homeless man named Honor Jackson, who recognizes that Bruce is going through drug withdrawal and helps him. As the two spend time together, traveling in what Honor calls an "odyssey" across the city, Bruce sees more evidence of his forgotten life. The two reflect on the day, and Honor gives Bruce an old broken radio as a sentimental gift. Abruptly, Bruce finds that Honor is no longer sitting next to him and learns from a local dealer that Honor had blown two hundred dollars on heroin and overdosed the previous day. This statement devastates Bruce and further confuses his sense of reality. At this point, Bruce seems to snap. He makes himself a costume out of red, yellow, and purple rags, and begins referring to the broken radio as the "Bat-radia". He then calls himself the "Batman of Zur-En-Arrh" and begins taking advice from Bat-Mite.

=== The Black Glove is taking hold ===
The Batman of Zur-En-Arrh hunts down and dispatches two small-time members of Black Glove, and finds that his next destination is Arkham Asylum, armed with nothing but a baseball bat, his Bat-radia, and miscellaneous bits of junk that serve in place of his utility belt. Batman and Bat-Mite ultimately make it to Arkham, where Bat-Mite says he cannot follow. Inside, Batman is confronted by Joker, who holds Jezebel Jet captive and kills her in front of him using the flowers that make up Joker's laughing gas.

As Batman regains his sanity and loses consciousness from the same poisonous flowers, Jezebel appears to be okay, the Joker is smiling, Hurt is there, and everyone is asking Batman "Now do you get it?" It is revealed that Jezebel Jet has been a part of Black Glove all along.

The term "Zur-En-Arrh" was written all over the city by Hurt as a subliminal trigger to be used when the time was right to break Batman's mind. Hurt calls off Joker, referring to him as "my good and faithful servant". The straitjacketed Batman is buried in a shallow grave, Hurt's intention being to exhume him once oxygen deprivation has permanently damaged his mind. Back in the asylum, Joker murders a Black Glove member and places a bet with those who remain: that Batman will emerge from the grave undamaged and hunt them down, as he always does. While the now mentally stable Batman escapes the shallow grave that Black Glove put him in, Joker points out that no one has investigated Batman's "Bat-radia". When they do, they activate a transmitter that brings Nightwing, Robin, Damian, and the League of Assassins right to them. Before Joker flees in an ambulance, he promises the remaining Black Glove members that he will collect his winnings from them soon and tells Hurt that he should not have called him his servant. Batman hunts down Hurt, who tries to convince Bruce that he is his father, but Batman believes him to be Mangrove Pierce, an actor who had once been his father's double. As Hurt tries to escape, Batman infiltrates his escaping helicopter, causing it to crash in a blazing explosion. Flying back to her own country, Jezebel Jet's plane is ambushed by Talia al Ghul's Man-Bat Commandos. Back in present-day Gotham, Le Bossu tells his henchmen that Batman has not been seen in months and that they are free to commit crimes unmolested, when suddenly a Bat-signal-like light comes on above them, bringing the story full circle to its opening image.

In the epilogue, young Bruce Wayne is walking home with his parents after seeing a Zorro movie. Bruce wonders what it would be like if Zorro showed up. Thomas Wayne responds, "The sad truth is, they'd probably throw someone like Zorro in Arkham", as he notices someone in front of them.

== Outline ==
Discussing the genesis of the storyline and its linkage to the rest of their run, Morrison commented:

I can tell you this much—this is the first story I had planned when Peter Tomasi, the editor at the time, asked me to do Batman, which must have been two years ago now…or longer. And the very first story title I noted down was "Batman R.I.P." I had a particular image for the cover, which Alex Ross has done a bang-zoom, thousand-times-better version of for the second part of the story. So it came from there…and out of that notion came the idea for the big overarching story I've been telling since I first came on the book. Everything…the "Zur-En-Arrh" graffiti, the Joker prose story, the Club of Heroes…every detail that's been in the book for the last couple of years is significant, everything is a clue to the grand design that's unfolding.

In an interview with Comic Book Resources, Grant Morrison explained that Batman's fate in the story is "so much better than death. People have killed characters in the past, but to me, that kind of ends the story! I like to keep the story twisting and turning. So what I am doing is a fate worse than death. Things that no one would expect to happen to these guys at all. This is the end of Bruce Wayne as Batman".

Morrison talked about "Batman R.I.P." at the April 2008 New York Comic Con "Spotlight on Grant Morrison" panel: "When we begin to suspect the identity of the villain, I think it's the most, like I said the other day, it's possibly the most shocking Batman revelation in 70 years".

DC Universe #0 shed some light on the potential plot of the series, with a scene between Batman and the Joker written as a prelude to the upcoming storyline. In the sequence, Batman confronts the Joker about the mysterious "Black Glove", villains who were behind the attempt to kill Batman during Morrison's "The Black Glove" (International Club of Heroes) arc in Batman #667–669. The Joker, nonchalantly dealing out a "dead man's hand" from a deck of cards, taunts Batman regarding his fear of the mystery villain and how Black Glove intends on destroying him.

== Related titles ==
Each title involved in "Batman R.I.P." has its own story that relates to the other titles, especially the main one of Batman, but the timelines of each do not coincide with the order in which they are published. For instance, the Detective Comics story occurs a few nights prior to the main story in the flagship Batman.

Likely part of the "R.I.P." aftermath, the ongoing Nightwing, Robin, and Birds of Prey titles ended in February 2009. No specific reason was given.

A portion of the storyline runs through Batman #682–683, and is intertwined with Final Crisis, in which Batman is Bruce Wayne. Writer Grant Morrison, in regards to the chronology of "R.I.P." and Final Crisis (because they were both being published simultaneously), said: "First it's 'R.I.P.'. Then the two-parter (#682–683) goes through Batman's whole career, in a big summing up of everything that also ties and leads directly into Final Crisis (Final Crisis #5 is where 'R.I.P.' resumes), and the final fate of Batman (Final Crisis #6)".

In Paul Dini's Heart of Hush storyline that ran in Detective Comics #846–850, parallel to the main story in Batman (but actually a prologue to it), Thomas Elliot returns to Gotham City to enact a plan to kill Batman before Black Glove. Also explored in this arc is his connection to the Gotham underworld, and how his family history helped transform Elliot into Hush. This story continues into Detective Comics #852 and Batman #685, a two-part "Faces of Evil" storyline that is also labeled as "Last Rites". In "The Great Leap" storyline that ran in Nightwing #147–150, Two-Face tasks Nightwing to protect an old flame of Harvey Dent's, Carol Bermingham, a witness in a high-profile mob trial. Nightwing is protecting Carol from Two-Face. In "Scattered Pieces", which ran in Robin #175–176, also parallel to the main story, Batman is missing and rampaging through the city in a delusional state. Nightwing is imprisoned in Arkham Asylum and Robin, fearing that Batman could have lost his sanity and gone rogue, tasks himself with finding his mentor and stopping him if necessary. In "Outsiders No More", which ran in Batman and the Outsiders #11–13, Batgirl, having a reduced roster, takes command and comes to the conclusion that no one can replace Batman. She starts seeking out a group of new Outsiders whose combined skills could match Batman's.

== Aftermath ==
Batman #683 reveals that Batman survives the explosion and returns to the Batcave to examine the gathered evidence on the Black Glove, but the events of Final Crisis draw his attention elsewhere. The events between R.I.P. and Final Crisis are covered in greater detail in Batman #701 and #702, which are presented as a missing chapter of R.I.P.

In the crossover story Final Crisis, Darkseid attempts to mind-control Batman, capturing him while he is investigating the death of the New God Orion and attempting to create an army of clones based on him, but cannot, and only manages to make imperfect copies of him, the clones being unable to cope with the psychological stress of being Batman. After escaping, Batman uses the same bullet that killed Orion to shoot Darkseid. At the same time, Darkseid strikes him with the Omega Sanction. Superman is later seen holding Batman's charred body, which is later revealed to be a clone. The Batman is now presumed dead and the Bat-Family and all of Gotham must figure out what will happen without him. In the end of Final Crisis #7, Anthro dies of old age and someone wearing Batman's pants, trunks, and boots places a utility belt over the dead body and then draws the Batman logo on a wall of the cave.

The main Batman title featured several months of retrospective stories that showcase the legacy of the Batman. Those were followed by a two-part story by Neil Gaiman called "Batman: Whatever Happened to the Caped Crusader?", a play on the Superman story, "Superman: Whatever Happened to the Man of Tomorrow?" by Alan Moore, which was also the last story before major changes in that character. According to DC Senior Vice President and executive editor, Dan DiDio, Bruce Wayne does not really die in the storyline, although it leads to his absence. Part of the aftermath later plays out in Blackest Night: Batman.

The titles Nightwing, Robin, and Birds of Prey were canceled, and both Batman and Detective Comics went on hiatus for three months in March 2009. In March, April, and May, a three-part series titled Batman: Battle for the Cowl, written and illustrated by Tony Daniel, focused on the aftermath of the series and the battle for Gotham. Tied to this was a three-part Oracle mini-series, a three-part Azrael mini-series, and two bookends titled Gotham City Gazette that encompassed the changes in all of those series. In addition, five one-shots were published focusing on key characters in upcoming storylines. These featured Man-Bat, Commissioner Gordon, the Network, the Underground, and Arkham Asylum.

Bruce Wayne returned in Batman: The Return of Bruce Wayne, which shows him trying to regain his memory and making his way back from the distant past, to the present, and to the end of time.

It was not until after Bruce Wayne's return in Batman and Robin #16 that the true meaning of the R.I.P. acronym was revealed as Rot In Purgatory.

== Publication ==
=== Collected editions ===
- Hardcover (ISBN 1401220908), DC Comics, 2009.
- Trade paperback (ISBN 1401225764), DC Comics, 2010.
- Unwrapped, hardcover (ISBN 1401261892), DC Comics, 2015.
- Absolute Edition, hardcover (ISBN 1799507602), DC Comics, 2026.

=== Main storyline ===
Pre-"R.I.P."

The "Batman R.I.P." storyline is the aftermath of "The Black Glove" storyline told in the following comics:

- Batman #667–669 "The Black Glove" (first mention and solo appearance of a Black Glove member); reprinted in both The Black Glove and Batman and Son
- Batman #672–675 "Space Medicine" (concludes "The Three Ghosts of Batman" storyline, mentioned earlier in Batman #664–666); reprinted in both The Black Glove and Batman and Son
- DC Universe #0 (three-page interior prelude to "Batman R.I.P."); reprinted in Batman R.I.P.
- Batman #676–681; reprinted in Batman R.I.P.

Last Rites

- Batman #682–683 (expands on the events in the bunker in Bludhaven in Final Crisis); reprinted in Batman R.I.P.

R.I.P. – The Missing Chapter

- Batman #701–702 (expands on the events that take place between "Batman R.I.P." and Final Crisis); reprinted in Time and the Batman

Final Crisis

- Final Crisis #1–2, 5–7 (resumes from "Batman R.I.P." with the fate of Batman); reprinted in Final Crisis

All of the above are included in the four trade paperbacks Batman and Son, Batman R.I.P., Final Crisis and Time and the Batman.

=== Tie-ins (not written by Grant Morrison) ===
"R.I.P."

- Detective Comics #846–850 "Heart of Hush" (takes place immediately before Morrison's officially titled main "Batman R.I.P." storyline)
- Nightwing (vol. 2) #147–150 "The Great Leap" (epilogued in Nightwing (vol. 2) #151; labeled "Last Rites")
- Robin (vol. 4) #175–182
- Batman and the Outsiders (vol. 2) #11–13 (takes place in accordance with Batman #680–681)

Last Rites

- Detective Comics #851 "The Last Days of Gotham" (Part 1 of 2)
- Batman #684 "The Last Days of Gotham" (Part 2 of 2)
- Detective Comics #852 "Faces of Evil" (Hush) ("Heart of Hush" epilogue, part 1 of 2)
- Batman #685 "Faces of Evil" (Catwoman) ("Heart of Hush" epilogue, part 2 of 2)
- Nightwing (vol. 2) #151 (although labeled "Last Rites", it is the epilogue to the Nightwing "R.I.P." storyline)
- Nightwing (vol. 2) #152 "Faces of Evil" (Ra's al Ghul) (Ra's reflects on Bruce's death)
- Nightwing (vol. 2) #153 (the last issue of Nightwing (vol. 2))
- Robin (vol. 4) #183 (the last issue of Robin (vol. 4); later relaunched as Red Robin)

=== References to earlier comics ===
The "Batman R.I.P." storyline references earlier comics involving The Black Casebook and the Club of Heroes. The following comics are referenced:

- Detective Comics #121 "Commissioner Gordon Walks a Beat"
- Batman #47 "The Origin of the Batman"
- Batman #62 "The Batman of England"
- Batman #65 "A Partner for Batman!"
- Batman #86 "Batman – Indian Chief"
- Detective Comics #215 "The Batmen of All Nations!"
- World's Finest Comics #89 "The Club of Heroes"
- Detective Comics #235 "The First Batman"
- Detective Comics #241 "The Rainbow Batman"
- Detective Comics #247 "The Man Who Ended Batman's Career"
- Batman #112 "Am I Really Batman?"
- Batman #113 "The Superman of Planet-X!"
- Detective Comics #267 "Batman Meets Bat-Mite"
- Batman #134 "The Rainbow Creature"
- Batman #153 "Prisoners of Three Worlds"
- Batman #156 "Robin Dies at Dawn" (first appearance of Doctor Hurt)
- Batman #162 "The Batman Creature"
- Batman: The Killing Joke
- 52 #30 (Week 30) and #47 (Week 47)

== Promotion ==
At New York Comic Con 2008, DC Comics gave away pins featuring Nightwing, Tim Drake, Jason Todd, and Hush with the words "I Am Batman" beneath them. The pins were also being given away at the Newsarama booth by DC's executive editor, Dan DiDio, during HeroesCon 2008 in Charlotte, North Carolina, and again by DiDio at Emerald City Comic-Con in Seattle.

Comics across the DC Universe also featured a checklist of the related issues, alongside a picture featuring Batman's empty cowl hanging on a cross-shaped tombstone.

== Critical reception ==
Popcultureshock wrote that the story was "a creative and intriguing Batman tale", but that elements of the story were repetitive of earlier ones and that "some readers will likely feel cheated that the real conclusion to what happens to Batman will occur in Final Crisis and not R.I.P." A popular Batman website, Batman-On-Film.com, posted a review that gave the series positive marks: "Does [the series'] sentiment not reflect who and what Batman is all about? How, even with all of the restrictions that come with humanity, we are still capable of superhuman achievement?"

The deluxe edition hardcover of the series made the New York Times Graphic Books Best Seller List in May 2009.

Cody Walker writing for Sequart Organization, called the story a "psychological deconstruction of the Dark Knight". He noted the repeated use of the colors red and black: "The Joker sees his world in black and red, and through the use of black and red imagery, Dr. Hurt is transforming Batman's mind so he can break the hero and transform his mind into a psychotic mess much like the Joker". He compares the Batman of Zur-En-Arrh persona's ridiculousness to the Joker, and notes the theme of identity in the story. Both Walker and Thom Dunn writing for Tor.com mentioned how the Batman of Zur-En-Arrh persona is Batman without Bruce Wayne. According to Dunn, the Batman of Zur-En-Arrh persona is "essentially, the pure id of Batman, reverting him to a primal, almost childlike state".

== In other media ==
- Bruce Timm expressed interest in an animated adaptation of Batman R.I.P. in an interview at Comic Con.
- Several members of the Black Glove appear in the "What If" Batman: The Brave and the Bold episode "The Knights of Tomorrow!"
