= Black Canary in other media =

Adaptations of Black Canary in other media
- Created by: Robert Kanigher; Carmine Infantino
- Original source: Comics published by DC Comics
- First appearance: Flash Comics #86 (August 1947)

Films and television
- Film(s): Justice League: The New Frontier (cameo); Justice League: Crisis on Two Earths (2010); DC Showcase: Green Arrow (2010); The Lego Batman Movie (2017); Scooby-Doo! & Batman: The Brave and the Bold (2018); Birds of Prey (2020)
- Television show(s): Legends of the Superheroes (1979); Smallville (2001); Birds of Prey (2002); Justice League Unlimited (2004); Batman: The Brave and the Bold (2008); Young Justice (2010); Arrow (2012); The Flash (2014); Legends of Tomorrow (2016); Vixen (2015)

Black Canary is a DC Comics superhero who has appeared across a range of live-action and animated television shows, as well as in several video games. Originally the pseudonym of the character Dinah Drake, the mantle was later passed on to her daughter, Dinah Laurel Lance. Both characters have appeared in different comic continuations and in other media, but the character has also been known by other names. She is usually portrayed as a proficient fighter, using martial arts as well as her trademark sonic scream or "Canary cry".

== Television ==
=== Live-action ===
- The Dinah Laurel Lance incarnation of Black Canary appears in Legends of the Superheroes, portrayed by Danuta Wesley.
- Characters based on Dinah Laurel Lance and Dinah Drake named Dinah Redmond and Carolyn Lance appear in Birds of Prey (2002), with Redmond portrayed by Rachel Skarsten as a teenager and AJ Michalka as a young girl and Carolyn portrayed by Lori Loughlin. Redmond is a resident of Gotham City who possesses psychic powers, is a founding member of the titular Birds of Prey, and the estranged daughter of Carolyn, who previously operated as Black Canary before retiring. Additionally, only the latter possesses the "Canary Cry", which is activated through whistling instead.
- The Dinah Lance incarnation of Black Canary appears in Smallville, portrayed by Alaina Huffman. This version is a vigilante and mercenary who moonlights as a controversial, brunette conservative columnist and talk show host for the Daily Planet in Metropolis. Introduced in the seventh season, she is hired by Lex Luthor to capture Green Arrow under the belief that the latter is a terrorist. After being convinced otherwise, the Green Arrow recruits her into his Justice League. In subsequent appearances, she would help Clark Kent defeat Doomsday, battle an army of Kandorian clones, and help the Green Arrow and Chloe Sullivan free their allies from virtual reality-induced stasis.
  - Additionally, the Dinah Drake incarnation of Black Canary appears in a painting of the Justice Society of America depicted in the two-part episode "Absolute Justice".
- Several characters based on Dinah Laurel Lance, Dinah Drake, and Black Canary appear in TV series set in the Arrowverse.
  - Sara Lance (initially portrayed by Jacqueline MacInnes Wood and by Caity Lotz in subsequent appearances) debuts in Arrow as a former lover of Oliver Queen, younger sister of Laurel Lance (see below), and youngest daughter of Quentin and Dinah Lance who operates as a vigilante simply called the "Canary" via a sonic device that enhances her screams. After being murdered and resurrected by Malcolm Merlyn, she is recruited by Rip Hunter to join his Legends in the spin-off series Legends of Tomorrow, during which she adopts the alias of the "White Canary" and eventually becomes the group's leader.
  - Dinah Laurel Lance, or simply "Laurel Lance" (portrayed by Katie Cassidy), debuts and primarily appears in Arrow as an attorney, Sara's older sister, Quentin and Dinah Lance's eldest daughter, and Oliver Queen's ex-girlfriend. Following Sara's death, Laurel undergoes training with Ted Grant and Nyssa al Ghul, asks Cisco Ramon to upgrade her sister's sonic device, and joins Queen in his vigilantism as Black Canary, wielding a black side-handle baton as her primary weapon, until she is killed by Damien Darhk in the fourth season. Additionally, Laurel makes guest appearances in The Flash and Legends of Tomorrow.
    - A villainous Earth-2 metahuman incarnation of Laurel Lance called Black Siren (also portrayed by Cassidy) debuts in The Flash episode "Invincible" as an enforcer for Zoom until she is captured by Team Flash and imprisoned in S.T.A.R. Labs' pipeline. She later appears in Arrow, having been broken out by Prometheus to help him seek revenge on Oliver. In time, she would eventually defect to the latter's side and become Black Canary of Earth-2.
    - A villainous Earth-X incarnation of Laurel Lance called Siren-X (also portrayed by Cassidy) appears in The Flash episode "Fury Rogue" as a Nazi and a member of the New Reichsmen.
  - Sara and Laurel's mother, Dinah Lance, appears in the first four seasons of Arrow, portrayed by Alex Kingston.
  - Following Laurel's death, a teenage orphan named Evelyn Crawford Sharp (portrayed by Madison McLaughlin) briefly takes up the mantle of Black Canary in the Arrow episode "Canary Cry" to avenge her family's deaths by seeking violent revenge against H.I.V.E. until Oliver and his team talk her out of it. By the fifth season, she joins Oliver as Artemis, though she is swayed by Prometheus into helping him.
  - Dinah Drake (portrayed by Juliana Harkavy) debuts in the fifth season of Arrow as a former undercover Central City Police Department detective unrelated to the Lance family who became a metahuman with a sonic scream after being exposed to dark matter when Harrison Wells' particle accelerator exploded. Team Arrow discover her in Hub City and aid her in apprehending her partner and lover Vincent Sobel's apparent killer before joining them as the new Black Canary. Subsequently, she transfers to the Star City Police Department (SCPD), but learns Sobel also became a metahuman as well as the murderous Vigilante. Throughout the seventh season, Drake is promoted to captain, but her secret identity is exposed and she loses her ability to perform the Canary Cry after being injured by Stanley Dover, forcing her to use Laurel and Sara's sonic device. As of flash-forwards to 2040 depicted in the eighth season, her injury has healed. Furthermore, the present Drake turns down a promotion in favor of relocating to Metropolis.
    - An Earth-2 incarnation of Dinah Drake (also portrayed by Harkavy) makes a minor appearance in the episode "Starling City" as a corrupt SCPD sergeant who works for her version of Tommy Merlyn until she and her Earth are destroyed by an anti-matter wave.

=== Animation ===
- A character based on Dinah Drake / Black Canary called Donna Nance / Black Siren appears in the Justice League two-part episode "Legends", voiced by Jennifer Hale. She is a member of the Justice Guild of America who hails from an alternate universe that is viewed as fiction by inhabitants of the "prime" universe and died amidst a nuclear war.
- The Dinah Laurel Lance incarnation of Black Canary appears in Justice League Unlimited, voiced by Morena Baccarin. This version is a member of the Justice League, student of Wildcat, lover of Green Arrow, and rival of Huntress.
- The Dinah Laurel Lance incarnation of Black Canary appears in Batman: The Brave and the Bold, voiced by Grey DeLisle. This version is a member of the Birds of Prey and an associate of the Justice Society of America (JSA) through Wildcat and her mother Dinah Drake / Black Canary (also voiced by DeLisle). Additionally, the latter appears in flashbacks depicted in the episode "The Golden Age of Justice!", in which she fought alongside the JSA until she was killed in action while saving people from a burning building. Before she died, she asked Wildcat to take care of her daughter for her.
- The Dinah Lance incarnation of Black Canary appears in Young Justice, voiced by Vanessa Marshall. Series co-creator Greg Weisman has said her role in the series was in part because she is his favorite DC Comics character. This version is a member of the Justice League who serves as a combat trainer and counselor for the Team. In the second season, she becomes chairwoman of the League.
- The Dinah Laurel Lance incarnation of Black Canary appears in the "Green Arrow" segment of DC Nation Shorts, voiced by Kari Wahlgren. This version's design is based on the Smallville incarnation.
- The Dinah Laurel Lance incarnation of Black Canary appears in the Mad segment "That's What Super Friends are For", voiced by Tara Strong.
- The Dinah Laurel Lance incarnation of Black Canary makes non-speaking cameo appearances in Justice League Action.

== Film ==
- The Dinah Drake and Dinah Laurel Lance incarnations of Black Canary make non-speaking cameo appearances in Justice League: The New Frontier, with the former appearing as a member of the Justice Society of America and the latter as a part of the next generation of heroes.
- The Dinah Laurel Lance incarnation of Black Canary appears in DC Showcase: Green Arrow, voiced again by Grey DeLisle. This version is the girlfriend, later fiancée, of Green Arrow.
- The Dinah Laurel Lance incarnation of Black Canary appears in Justice League: Crisis on Two Earths, voiced by Kari Wührer. This version is an associate of the Justice League. Additionally, a villainous alternate universe incarnation of Lance named Scream Queen makes a minor appearance as a member of the Crime Syndicate under Johnny Quick's command.
- The Dinah Laurel Lance incarnation of Black Canary makes a non-speaking cameo appearance in The Lego Batman Movie.
- The Dinah Laurel Lance incarnation of Black Canary appears in Teen Titans Go! To the Movies.
- The Dinah Laurel Lance incarnation of Black Canary appears in Scooby-Doo! & Batman: The Brave and the Bold, voiced again by Grey DeLisle.
- The Dinah Laurel Lance incarnation of Black Canary appears in Birds of Prey (2020), portrayed by Jurnee Smollett. In referencing her take on the "Canary Cry", Smollett likened it to Black Canary's attacks in Injustice 2. This version initially works for Roman Sionis as a nightclub singer before becoming a vigilante to prevent him from killing Cassandra Cain. Additionally, Lance's mother was a member of the Gotham City Police Department who worked with Renee Montoya before dying in the line of duty, which made Lance reluctant to fight crime. After helping defeat Sionis, Lance, Montoya, and Helena Bertinelli found the titular Birds of Prey.
- An alternate universe incarnation of Dinah Drake / Black Canary appears in Justice Society: World War II, voiced by Elysia Rotaru. This version is a member of the Justice Society of America from Earth-2 who was active during her Earth's version of the titular war, was previously in a relationship with Larry Lance, and displays an attraction toward teammate Hawkman until he is killed in action.
- The Dinah Laurel Lance incarnation of Black Canary appears in Justice League x RWBY: Super Heroes & Huntsmen: Part Two, voiced by Jamie Chung.
- The Dinah Drake incarnation of Black Canary appears in Justice League: Crisis on Infinite Earths - Part Three, voiced again by Elysia Rotaru.

== Video games ==
- The Dinah Laurel Lance incarnation of Black Canary appears as a playable character in the PSP version of Justice League Heroes, voiced by Jennifer Hale.
- The Dinah Laurel Lance incarnation of Black Canary appears as a playable character in Batman: The Brave and the Bold – The Videogame, voiced again by Grey DeLisle.
- The Dinah Laurel Lance incarnation of Black Canary appears in DC Universe Online, voiced by Kelley Huston.
- The Dinah Laurel Lance incarnation of Black Canary appears in Lego Batman 2: DC Super Heroes, voiced again by Kari Wahlgren.
- The Dinah Laurel Lance incarnation of Black Canary appears in Young Justice: Legacy, voiced again by Vanessa Marshall.
- The Dinah Laurel Lance incarnation of Black Canary appears as a support card in the mobile version of Injustice: Gods Among Us.
- The Dinah Laurel Lance incarnation of Black Canary appears as a character summon in Scribblenauts Unmasked: A DC Comics Adventure.
- The Dinah Laurel Lance incarnation of Black Canary appears in Lego Batman 3: Beyond Gotham, voiced again by Kari Wahlgren. Additionally, Sara Lance / Canary appears as a downloadable playable character.
- The Dinah Laurel Lance incarnation of Black Canary appears as a playable character in Injustice 2, voiced again by Vanessa Marshall. This version is the mother of Connor and a member of Batman's Insurgency. Additionally, Sara Lance / White Canary appears as a "Premier Skin" for Lance in the mobile version of Injustice 2.
- The Dinah Laurel Lance incarnation of Black Canary appears as a playable character in Lego DC Super-Villains, voiced again by Vanessa Marshall.

== Miscellaneous ==
- The Dinah Laurel Lance incarnation of Black Canary appears in the Justice League Unlimited tie-in comic book.
- The Arrowverse incarnation of Laurel Lance / Black Canary appears in Vixen, voiced by Katie Cassidy.
- The Dinah Drake incarnation of Black Canary appears in the DC Super Hero Girls episode "Welcome to Super Hero High" as a graduate of the titular school.
- In 2016, DC Comics released a three-track EP called EP 1 to promote the Black Canary comic book, in which the titular character becomes the lead singer of a band that shares her name.
- The Dinah Laurel Lance incarnation of Black Canary appears in the DC Icons novel Black Canary: Breaking Silence, by Alexandra Monir. This version is a resident of a Court of Owls-controlled Gotham City.
- An unidentified Black Canary is referenced in Eben Brooks' song "Dinah Was Never", which was released as part of the album Heroes.
- The Dinah Laurel Lance incarnation of Black Canary appears in the DC Heroes United interactive series and mobile game, voiced by Amanda Lee.
- Black Canary appears as part of Lego Minifigures Series 2 of the LEGO Batman Movie.
