= Harley Quinn (DC Extended Universe) =

Fictional character in DC Extended Universe

- DC Extended Universe character
- Margot Robbie as Harley Quinn in Suicide Squad (2016)
- First appearance: Suicide Squad (2016)
- Last appearance: The Suicide Squad (2021)
- Based on: Harley Quinn by: Paul Dini; Bruce Timm
- Adapted by: David Ayer
- Portrayed by: Margot Robbie

In-universe information
- Full name: Harleen Frances Quinzel
- Title: Doctor
- Occupation: Former psychiatrist; Criminal; Vigilante
- Affiliation: Suicide Squad
- Significant others: Joker (ex-partner); Silvio Luna (ex-fiancé)
- Origin: Gotham City, New Jersey, United States
- Nationality: American

Dr. Harleen Frances Quinzel, later known as Harley Quinn, is a fictional character in the DC Extended Universe (DCEU), based on the character of the same name created by Paul Dini and Bruce Timm as a comic relief henchwoman for the supervillain Joker in the DC Animated Universe (DCAU) animated series Batman: The Animated Series (1992–1995) and later adapted to the DC Universe. Portrayed by actress Margot Robbie, she first appears in film in Suicide Squad (2016), playing a major role, and also stars in the spin-off solo film Birds of Prey (and the Fantabulous Emancipation of One Harley Quinn) (2020) and standalone sequel film The Suicide Squad (2021).

She is first depicted as Joker's psychiatrist in prison, then later his lover and partner in crime, before going off on her own misadventures in her DCEU appearances. Her introduction sequence in Suicide Squad mentions her as an accomplice and directly responsible for the murder of Batman's sidekick Robin. Robbie's portrayal of Harley Quinn has received widespread critical acclaim.

== Development and portrayal ==
=== Origins, casting and execution ===
Harley Quinn was a late addition to the lineup of DC Entertainment supervillains, making her debut in the 1990s as a love interest to the Joker in Batman: The Animated Series. Nonetheless, she has become one of DC's most popular characters, especially as she has become an additional foil to Joker's character aside from Batman, and she later became a full-fledged character in the comics. Though originating as a supervillain, Harley, much like Catwoman, has been gradually developed as an antiheroine in later comic storylines. She has appeared in numerous adaptations of DC Comics storylines, being voiced by Arleen Sorkin in the DC Animated Universe (DCAU) and other actresses such as Tara Strong and Kaley Cuoco in the adult animated series based on the character.

Australian actress Margot Robbie was cast to portray Harley Quinn in the DC Extended Universe (DCEU), beginning with 2016's Suicide Squad, first being offered the role in October 2014. Robbie stated that it took three hours to prepare her hair, makeup and costume for the role and "at least 45 minutes" to take it off. In addition, Joker actor Jared Leto surprised Robbie by gifting her a black rat during filming. Despite her initial shock, Robbie kept the rat as a pet, according to Amanda Waller actress Viola Davis.

Following the financial success of the film, Warner Bros. announced a female-centered spinoff of the film which would eventually become 2020's Birds of Prey, with Robbie reprising her role for that film and serving as a producer. Robbie had pitched the film to Warner Bros. in 2015 as "an R-rated girl gang film including Harley, because I was like, 'Harley needs friends.' Harley loves interacting with people, so don't ever make her do a standalone film." Robbie felt it was important for the film to have a female director. While Warner Bros. and DC Films had various other Harley Quinn-oriented films in development, Birds of Prey was the only one with whose development Robbie was directly involved.

Robbie reprised her role as Harley Quinn in 2021's The Suicide Squad, a standalone sequel to the 2016 film. She was one of four actors from the original film to reprise their roles.

=== Themes and characterization ===
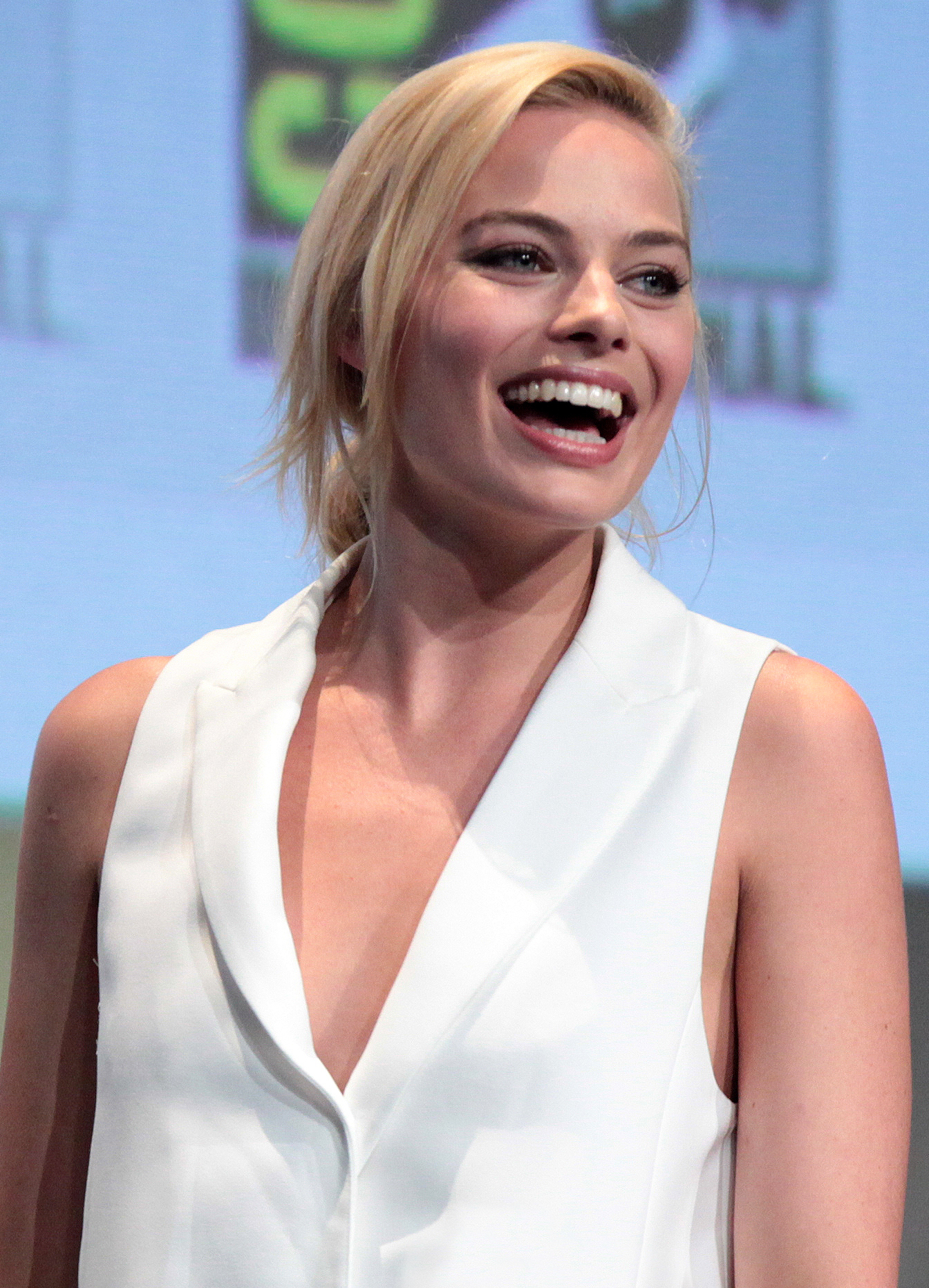
Margot Robbie in 2015

In an analysis of the character by The Perspective, Harley Quinn is seen as both a ruthless villain undeserving of sympathy and a tragic character. While some of her deeds, such as murdering Jason Todd with Joker and the lawyers that put her boyfriend in prison, torturing Batman, and robbing a store "just for fun" in Suicide Squad, are inexcusable, Harley is also constantly manipulated by Joker, with many of her crimes serving simply to get Joker to "love" her, a hallmark of one-sided, abusive relationships. In addition, Harley is arguably objectified in the film, with many of her outfits being extremely revealing. While being interviewed on her role in Suicide Squad, Robbie described Quinn as one of the Squad's most manipulative members, and her relationship with Joker as "incredibly dysfunctional", adding that Quinn is, "mad about him—like, literally, mad. She's crazy. But she loves him. And it's a really unhealthy, dysfunctional relationship. But an addictive one." David Ayer's original version of Suicide Squad would have shown more of Joker and Harley's abusive relationship and contrasted it with a budding, healthier romance with Task Force X teammate Floyd Lawton / Deadshot.

Harley's portrayal in Birds of Prey was designed to further develop her character independently of the Joker's influence, as mentioned by screenwriter Christina Hodson. Hodson called Harley the character she enjoyed developing most due to her unpredictable personality. The film also reveals Harley was abandoned by her alcoholic father, has had malevolent tendencies even before her encounter with Joker, and that she has had her "heart broken by both men and women" in the film's introduction, confirming her bisexuality as in the original comics.

Quinn has also been noted for her use of a baseball bat as a weapon throughout the films, with some outlets even referring to it as a trademark of the character. During the filming of Suicide Squad, Robbie accidentally hit herself in the face with a prop baseball bat, with the actress also keeping one of the bats after filming ended. Quinn also fights with a mallet throughout Suicide Squad.

== Fictional character biography ==
=== Early life and meeting the Joker ===
Harleen Quinzel was abandoned by her alcoholic father at a young age and frequently got in trouble with the law. She later became a psychiatrist and, as one of her first cases, works with the Joker (Jared Leto) during his incarceration in Arkham Asylum. The Joker gradually seduces Quinzel and gets her to fall madly in love with him. He later persuades her to release him, subjecting her to shock therapy in retaliation for her using it on him, and manipulating her into jumping into a vat of the same chemicals that disfigured him to prove her love for him. The chemicals bleach her skin and dye her hair just as they did the Joker's, and drive her just as insane as he is. The duo become partners in crime and, as Amanda Waller (Viola Davis) puts it, the "King and Queen of Gotham City".

Harley and Joker carry out numerous crimes, such as murdering Batman's (Ben Affleck) protégé, Robin. Soon afterwards, Batman tracks down the couple in the Joker's Lamborghini, causing them to crash, and he captures Harley while Joker escapes.

=== Capture and enlistment into Task Force X ===
Now imprisoned in an electrified cage at Belle Reve Penitentiary, Harley regularly antagonizes and attacks the prison guards. Waller recruits Harley and several other incarcerated metahumans and criminals, including Deadshot (Will Smith), Captain Boomerang (Jai Courtney), Killer Croc (Adewale Akinnuoye-Agbaje), El Diablo (Jay Hernandez), and Slipknot (Adam Beach), into a task force called the Suicide Squad after the U.S. government reluctantly gives her permission. The squad is quickly put to use after one of Waller's intended recruits, Enchantress (Cara Delevingne), goes rogue, and are put under the command of Rick Flag (Joel Kinnaman) and his bodyguard, Katana (Karen Fukuhara). The squad's members do not get along at first and are reluctant to go along with orders until Slipknot is executed by a bomb planted in his neck for trying to escape.

The Joker discovers Harley's predicament and blackmails a prison guard into revealing her location, in addition to forcing an A.R.G.U.S. scientist to disable her bomb. Meanwhile, Harley bonds with Deadshot and annoys Flag with her antics while fighting Enchantress's minions in Midway City. The Joker then arrives in a helicopter to rescue Harley, but one of Waller's guards shoots down the chopper. Harley jumps out of the aircraft before it crashes, leading to the Joker's apparent death. After Waller is captured by Enchantress's minions and Deadshot discovers the true reason for the mission, the squad realizes they must face Enchantress and her brother Incubus (Alain Chanoine) alone and head to a bar to drown their sorrows. Flag reveals that Enchantress's human alter ego, Dr. June Moon, was his girlfriend prior to being possessed, and frees the convicts, but they decide to help him after bonding over drinks.

The squad locates Enchantress and Incubus at a partially flooded subway station. Killer Croc and several Navy SEALs plant a bomb underneath Incubus, while El Diablo sacrifices himself to detonate it, destroying Incubus. Enchantress defeats the remaining squad members and entices them to join her in exchange for granting them their deepest desires; Harley's desire is for the Joker to settle down and start a family with her. Harley feigns interest in order to get close enough to cut out Enchantress's heart with Katana's sword, then aids Deadshot and Flag in defeating Enchantress and freeing June. Waller rewards Harley with 10 years off her life sentence and an espresso machine. Shortly afterward, the Joker, who survived the crash, breaks into Belle Reve with his henchmen and frees Harley.

=== Breakup with Joker and "emancipation" ===
Four years after the events of Suicide Squad, the Joker breaks up with Harley and leaves her in the streets of Gotham City. After she finds refuge with Doc (Dana Lee), a restaurant owner, she copes with the breakup by cutting her hair, picking up roller derby, and adopting a spotted hyena which she names after Bruce Wayne. After getting drunk at a bar and encountering Roman Sionis / Black Mask (Ewan McGregor) and Dinah Lance (Jurnee Smollett), the latter of whom rescues her from abduction, Harley goes to Ace Chemicals to blow up the facility as a way to publicly announce her separation from the Joker. GCPD detective Renee Montoya (Rosie Perez) arrives at the scene while investigating mob killings, finding Harley's necklace and noting her vulnerability without the Joker's protection. Soon enough, Harley finds herself constantly under attack from people she and/or the Joker had wronged in the past.

Upon pickpocket Cassandra Cain (Ella Jay Basco) stealing a diamond embedded with the account numbers to the fortune of the massacred Bertinelli crime family, Sionis kidnaps Harley and forces her to track down Cassandra in exchange for her life. Harley locates Cassandra in GCPD custody and breaks her out using a variety of fireworks, and the two later bond while hiding in Doc's restaurant. However, the apartment is bombed by a criminal resentful of Harley. Doc, who had been contacted by assassin Helena Bertinelli / Huntress (Mary Elizabeth Winstead) for information on Cassandra, tells Harley that he had sold her out for a large sum of money, forcing her to flee with Cassandra. Harley renegotiates her deal with Sionis, offering to turn Cassandra and the diamond (which the latter had swallowed) over in exchange for his protection and agreeing to meet at an abandoned amusement park.

After tying Cassandra up and having her ingest greasy food and laxatives to try and extract the diamond painlessly, Harley is confronted by Montoya, who is building a case against Sionis, while Sionis's right-hand man Victor Zsasz (Chris Messina) arrives with Dinah, who had informed Montoya, in tow. Before Zsasz can inflict harm on Dinah and take Cassandra, Helena arrives and kills Zsasz, who was the last of her family's killers. Harley, Montoya, Helena, and Dinah have a standoff before more of Sionis's men arrive. Realizing they all have reasons to hate Sionis, the group decides to team up and defend themselves from Sionis's men using the weapons Harley had brought. Sionis captures Cassandra in the resulting melee and Harley gives chase on roller blades with help from Helena. As Harley confronts Sionis at a nearby pier, he prepares to kill Cassandra, who plants a live grenade in his jacket while he is distracted. Harley pushes Sionis off the pier just before the grenade explodes, killing him.

In the aftermath of destroying Sionis's criminal empire, Montoya quits the GCPD. Using the money within the accounts hidden inside the diamond, Helena joins with Dinah and Montoya in establishing a team of vigilantes called the Birds of Prey. Harley and Cassandra escape, selling the diamond itself to a pawn shop and starting their own business.

=== Reincarceration and Corto Maltese mission ===
Some time after being re-incarcerated at Belle Reve penitentiary for crashing her car into a bank due to road rage, Harley is sent with other inmates from Belle Reve to the South American island nation of Corto Maltese after its government is overthrown by an anti-American regime. Under orders from Amanda Waller, in exchange for shortened sentences, the squad is tasked with destroying Jötunheim, a local Nazi-era research facility tower that holds a secretive experiment known as "Project Starfish", which the new regime plans to weaponize it against other nations. The team, led once again by Colonel Rick Flag Jr. and consisting of Harley, Captain Boomerang, Brian Durlin / Savant (Michael Rooker), Richard "Dick" Hertz / Blackguard (Pete Davidson), Gunter Braun / Javelin (Flula Borg), Cory Pitzner / T.D.K. (Nathan Fillion), Mongal (Mayling Ng) and "John Doe" / Weasel (Sean Gunn), is almost entirely wiped out by the Corto Maltesean military upon landing, and Harley is taken prisoner by the local government. She is courted by the current Corto Maltesean dictator, Silvio Luna (Juan Diego Botto), who admires her "resistance to the American regime". Harley spends a romantic day with Luna and agrees to marry him, but after he reveals his intention to use Project Starfish to punish political dissidents, Harley, still haunted by her past dating mistakes and considering his willingness to kill children a "red flag", kills him. She is then put back into custody and tortured for interrogation.

Due to the first team being largely a decoy, a second team, both neither knew about, enters the country undetected and finds a recovered Flag among Corto Maltesean rebels, while Harley escapes the local government and reunites with Flag and the team, which includes Robert DuBois / Bloodsport (Idris Elba), Christopher "Chris" Smith / Peacemaker (John Cena), Nanaue / King Shark (voice of Sylvester Stallone), Cleo Cazo / Ratcatcher 2 (Daniela Melchior) and her pet rat Sebastian (voice of Dee Bradley Baker), and Abner Krill / Polka-Dot Man (David Dastmalchian). The new squad captures Project Starfish's head geneticist Dr. Gaius Grieves / Thinker (Peter Capaldi) and blackmails him to entering them into Jötunheim in exchange of sparing his life, where they encounter the said project's asset, the starfish-like alien creature, Starro the Conqueror.

The team learns that not only has, for 30 years, the previous Corto Maltesean government been subjecting both its own citizens and political enemies to torture to death and tests by the alien, but that Starro was captured by American astronauts and that Thinker's experiments had been financed by the U.S. government after making a secret deal with the said previous regime, information Waller seeks to have buried. The team accidentally detonates the explosives early, damaging the tower, and Starro breaks out, kills Thinker, and begins to wreak havoc and control the island's population. After Peacemaker, who was secretly under orders by Waller to keep the information secret, kills a turned rogue Flag before being wounded by Bloodsport and left for dead, the team defies Waller's orders of leaving the island to fight the colossal alien. Harley pokes a hole in Starro's eye with a javelin previously bequeathed to her by a dying Javelin, allowing Ratcatcher 2's summoned army of the island's rats to chew Starro to death from the inside. The island is saved and the rebels take over, and Harley and her remaining teammates – Bloodsport, King Shark, Ratcatcher 2, and Sebastian – are airlifted to safety after Bloodsport blackmails Waller with the information of Project Starfish into releasing them all from prison and dropping his daughter Tyla's (Storm Reid) court trial. As they leave, Harley proposing to Bloodsport to become friends with each other, in honor of their late common friend Flag.

== Alternate version ==
=== Knightmare timeline ===
In a flashforward "Knightmare" scene to a post-apocalyptic reality, where Darkseid (Ray Porter) and a mind-controlled Superman (Henry Cavill) conquer Earth, (Note: As depicted in Zack Snyder's Justice League) after Joker taunts Batman (who is reluctantly allied with him) about the deaths of his parents and Robin, Batman reveals that Harley had died in his arms and that he made her a promise to "slowly kill" Joker, which he intends to do when he no longer has use for him. In a deleted scene, Joker asks Batman, "Who do you think screamed the loudest? The girl, or the boy?" in reference to both his and Harley's own murder of Robin and Harley's death, before laughing in Batman's face.

== Reception ==
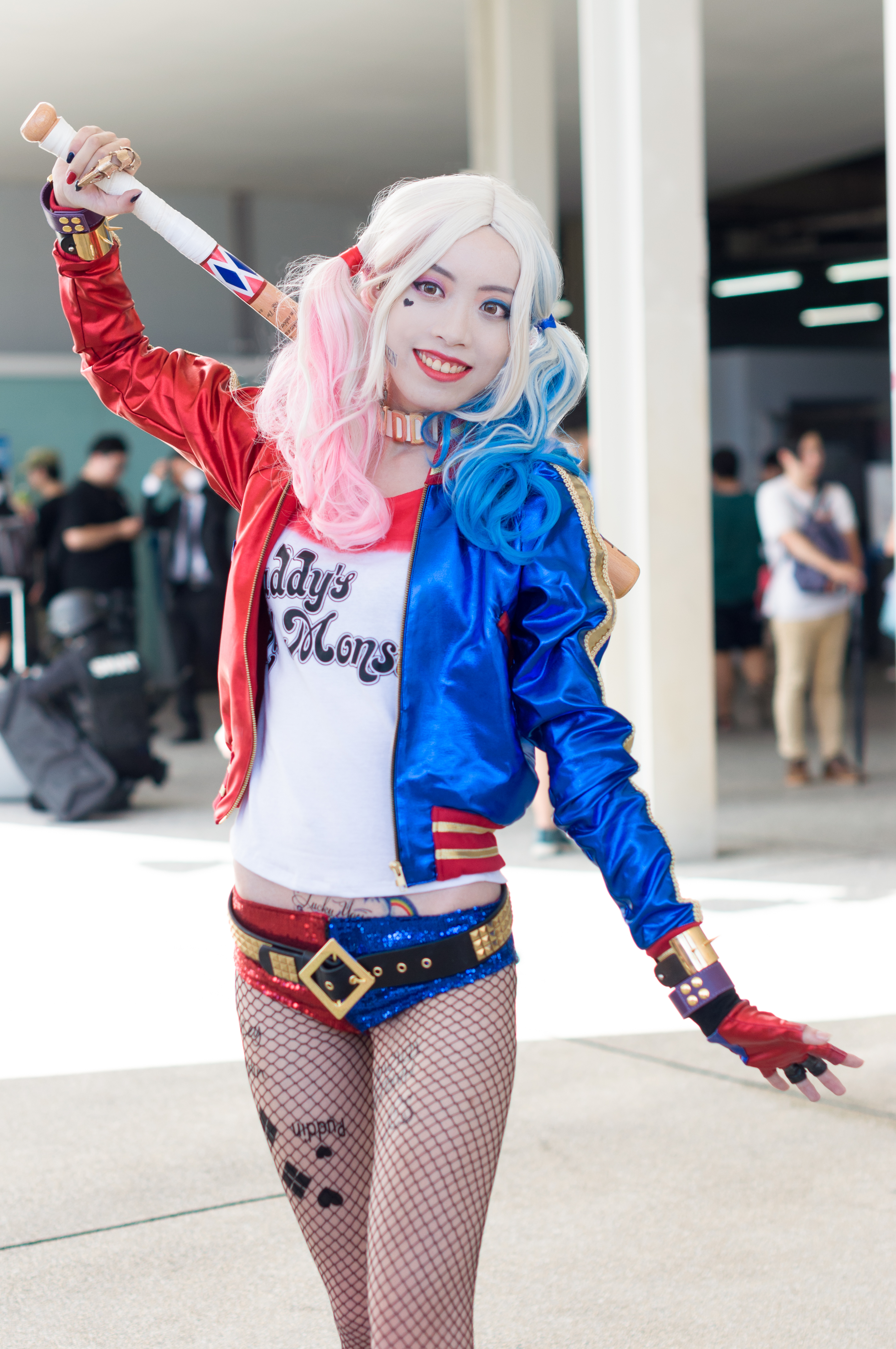
Cosplayer wearing Harley Quinn's costume from Suicide Squad (2016).

After the release of Suicide Squad in 2016, Margot Robbie's performance as Harley Quinn was well received, with many critics considering her performance the film's biggest highlight and eager to see more of the character in future films. Robbie's performance in Birds of Prey similarly received acclaim. Rotten Tomatoes summarized its review of the film: "With a fresh perspective, some new friends, and loads of fast-paced action, Birds of Prey captures the colorfully anarchic spirit of Margot Robbie's Harley Quinn." In addition, Richard Roeper of the Chicago Sun-Times wrote in his positive review of the film that "Robbie turns in a much richer and funnier and layered performance as Harley this time around, thanks in large part to the stiletto-sharp screenplay by Christina Hodson."

=== Reaction of creators ===
==== Suicide Squad ====
After seeing Harley Quinn's design from Suicide Squad for the first time before the release of the film, Bruce Timm said that she "looks actually pretty cute!", while Paul Dini commented "It's a rougher, more street look. I think it works fine." Later after its release, Dini talked about Robbie's portrayal of the character in the movie, saying "I thought Margot did a really terrific job and I loved all the nods to her origin such as the elements of Mad Love that were alluded to in the therapy session with her and The Joker, some of their relationship and of course the brief flash of her in the Bruce Timm costume as interpreted by Alex Ross in the dance sequence they did. I felt she had a really good sense of humour about capturing the character and there are moments where you see her mind is always working. She really captured the kinetic energy of the character. If anything, it proved to me that character has enough to support her own movie."

==== Birds of Prey ====
On Birds of Prey, Dini stated: "Oh I loved it. I thought it was great. I thought it was a blast. This movie would not have gotten made at all without Margot Robbie's passion and involvement, and she was campaigning for a Harley movie very strongly, I think before they even started shooting Suicide Squad. She recognized the value in the character and knew audiences were going to enjoy her in Suicide Squad. She and Christina Hodson worked together on it, and they brought in Cathy Yan as the director. This was a passion project for all of them, and I think they really got the essence of the character down, and they made her quite a lot of fun and appealing in so many ways. She's not totally the animated version, and it's not totally the Jimmy [Palmiotti] and Amanda [Conner] version, but it kind of borrows from all of them and creates its own reality and its own fun. There are so many moments in that movie that I just think are wonderful. Yes and sharing hair ties! [Laughs.] I have one wish from Birds of Prey: I hope everybody has someone in their life that gets looked at the way that Harley looks at her breakfast sandwich. She stares at it with abject adoration. At the [premiere] party Robbie asked, "Was there anything wrong in the movie?" I said, "It was the breakfast sandwich. It was so good I wanted to leave and have one. And I mourned its death." One other thing I said to her... When I saw her running, laughing hysterically, pushing a shopping cart full of Peeps, I said, "That's my girl." All those little impish things that she did in the movie—sitting down eating cereal, watching Tweety Bird cartoons, and just kind of skipping through life cheerfully oblivious of the devastation she's caused—that's Harley."

== See also ==
- Harley Quinn
- Characters of the DC Extended Universe
