= Bertinelli =

Bertinelli is a surname of Italian origin. Notable people with the surname include:

- Valerie Bertinelli (born 1960), American actress
- Samuele Bertinelli (born 1976), Italian politician
- Helena Bertinelli, a fictional character
