= Savant (DC Comics) =

DC Comics character

- Savant, art by Joe Bennett.

Publication information
- Publisher: DC Comics
- First appearance: Birds of Prey #56 (August 2003)
- Created by: Gail Simone; Ed Benes

In-story information
- Alter ego: Brian Durlin
- Team affiliations: Birds of Prey; Suicide Squad
- Partnerships: Creote
- Abilities: Genius level intellect; Master martial artist; Computer operation; Multilingualism

Savant (Brian Durlin) is a superhero appearing in American comic books published by DC Comics, depicted as a member of the Birds of Prey and the Suicide Squad.

The character made his cinematic debut in the DC Extended Universe film The Suicide Squad, portrayed by Michael Rooker.

== Fictional character biography ==
Brian Durlin is the spoiled heir to an enormous fortune who moves to Gotham City to become a vigilante. After Batman discourages him because of his lack of care to protect others, Durlin becomes a blackmailer known as Savant. He is assisted by ex-KGB agent Aleksandr Creote.

As part of a plan by Calculator to get to Oracle, Savant is kidnapped and tortured by agents of the Secret Society of Super Villains before being rescued by the Birds of Prey. Two years later, Savant's non-linear memory causes him to believe that his torture had occurred only minutes prior, leaving him in mental agony. He attempts to commit suicide, but is saved by Barbara Gordon. Barbara tells Savant that Creote is in love with him, which he eventually reciprocates. The two join the Birds of Prey as a technician and bodyguard respectively.

In The New 52 continuity reboot, Savant is a member of Amanda Waller's Suicide Squad.

== Powers and abilities ==
Savant possesses genius-level intellect and is an expert at martial arts, computer operation, and multilingualism. However, he also exhibits non-linear memory due to a neuro-chemical imbalance, which causes his recollection of events to occur out of order and leaves him with a distorted sense of time. While this has allowed him to resist an interrogation attempt, making it appear to last hours instead of days for him, he was left believing it happened five minutes prior and was in constant agony for two years afterward.

== In other media ==
- Savant appears in The Suicide Squad, portrayed by Michael Rooker. This version is a war veteran who was convicted of blackmail. Amanda Waller recruits him into the eponymous team for a mission to Corto Maltese before killing him after he attempts to leave the group.
- Savant appears as a character summon in Scribblenauts Unmasked: A DC Comics Adventure.
