= Birds of Prey (team) =

American comic series and superhero team

- Textless cover of Birds of Prey #8 (March 2011). Art by Stanley “Artgerm” Lau.

Group publication information
- Publisher: DC Comics
- First appearance: Black Canary/Oracle: Birds of Prey #1 (January 1996)
- Created by: Chuck Dixon

In-story information
- Base(s): Clocktower; Aerie One
- Member(s): Current: Barbara Gordon; Black Canary; Cassandra Cain; Big Barda; Zealot; Harley Quinn; Grace Choi; Meridian (Maps Mizoguchi); Onyx; Sin; Vixen; Former: Oracle (Gus Yale); Batwoman; Jade Canary; Gypsy; Hawkgirl (Kendra Saunders); Judomaster; Manhunter (Kate Spencer); Misfit; Hawk; Dove (Dawn Granger); Black Alice; Power Girl; Starling; Katana; Strix; Condor; Catwoman; Poison Ivy; Huntress; Lady Blackhawk

Birds of Prey
- : Cover of Black Canary/Oracle: Birds of Prey #1 (1996), art by Gary Frank.

Series publication information
- Schedule: Monthly
- Format: Ongoing series
- Genre: Superhero
- Publication date: List: (vol. 1) January 1999 – April 2009 (vol. 2) July 2010 – August 2011 (vol. 3) September 2011 – October 2014 (Batgirl and the Birds of Prey) July 2016 – May 2018 (vol 4) September 2023 – December 2025
- Number of issues: List: (vol. 1): 127 (vol. 2): 15 (vol. 3): 34 Batgirl and the Birds of Prey: 22 and a Rebirth one-shot (vol. 4): 28

Creative team
- Writer(s): Chuck Dixon; Terry Moore; Gilbert Hernandez; Gail Simone; Tony Bedard; Sean McKeever; Duane Swierczynski; Shawna Benson; Julie Benson; Kelly Thompson
- Artist(s): Greg Land; Butch Guice; Rick Leonardi; Amanda Conner; Casey Jones; Ed Benes; Joe Bennett; Paulo Siqueira; Nicola Scott; Michael O'Hare; Claude St. Aubin; Jesus Saiz; Claire Roe; Roge Antonio; Leonardo Romero
- Creator(s): Chuck Dixon

The Birds of Prey are a superhero team featured in American comic books published by DC Comics. The book's premise originated as a partnership between Black Canary and Barbara Gordon, who had adopted the codename Oracle at the time, but has expanded to include additional superheroines. The team name "Birds of Prey" was attributed to DC assistant editor Frank Pittarese in the text page of the first issue. The group is initially based in Gotham City and later operates in Metropolis and then relocates once more to "Platinum Flats", California, a new locale introduced in Birds of Prey in 2008.

The series was conceived by Jordan B. Gorfinkel and originally written by Chuck Dixon. Gail Simone scripted the comic from issue #56 to #108. Sean McKeever was originally set to replace Simone, but McKeever subsequently decided to leave the project and only wrote issues #113–117; Tony Bedard, who wrote issues #109–112, briefly took over the title at issue #118. Artists have included Butch Guice, Greg Land, Ed Benes and Joe Bennett; Nicola Scott began a stint as artist with issue #100. In 2011, the title was relaunched under writer Duane Swierczynski and artist Jesus Saiz. With the 2016 company-wide soft relaunch DC Rebirth, the Birds of Prey are re-introduced in the new title Batgirl and the Birds of Prey, featuring a team consisting of Batgirl, Black Canary and Huntress.

The core of the team is made up of Oracle, who serves as the leader of the group, Huntress and Black Canary, with other heroines forming a rotating roster sometimes for extended periods, sometimes for merely one adventure. After Black Canary's departure, Huntress remained as the staple member and field leader, alongside new "core members". Following the events of Flashpoint (2011) and the company-wide relaunch as part of The New 52, Oracle recovers her mobility and reclaims her former Batgirl identity, taking a brief hiatus from the team in the process. Despite the previously all-female central roster, male allies such as Nightwing, Wildcat, Savant and Creote frequently assist missions.

== Publication history ==
=== One-shots and initial series by Chuck Dixon ===
The title series began with Chuck Dixon's one shot Black Canary/Oracle: Birds of Prey (cover date 1996 / published December 1995). Initially, the two heroines featured were Barbara Gordon (formerly "Batgirl") and Dinah Lance (currently "Black Canary"). From the beginning, Canary was written as passionate and idealistic. In an interview with Comics Bulletin, Dixon described this choice as a fertile clash of values: "Dinah's more idealistic approach is at the heart of this book".

=== Gail Simone era ===
When Gail Simone took over the series in 2003, she added the Huntress to the lineup. In the first arc, entitled "Of Like Minds", Black Canary walks into a trap set by Brian Durlin, known as Savant, and his assistant Creote. With Black Canary now critically injured and chained, Savant begins listing demands, the most significant of which is the true identity of Batman. In the end, Huntress and Canary defeat their enemies, and form a team. Additionally, the Twelve Brothers in Silk, a group of martial artists themed after the twelve signs of the Chinese zodiac, are introduced as enemies of the Birds of Prey.

Author Simone commented on the new lineup, saying that each character provided a foil for the two others: "In this case, Babs and Dinah respect each other tremendously, and each is capable of great things the other is not. Dinah's not just Oracle's legs, sometimes, she's her conscience, or her muse, or just her best friend. And Oracle is far more to Dinah than just the mission controller. They trust each other, and out of that, there's a friendship that they believe in. Huntress...I see Helena as someone who is not a loner completely by choice. Dinah is so accepting and so open that Helena sees an opportunity to be part of something without having to force her way in. There's friction, because once Helena puts the mask on, she's really not very good fitting in. But she likes that they're giving her a chance. Whether she blows it or not, you'll have to keep reading".

Detail from the cover for Birds of Prey #80, art by Ed Benes.

Simone was appreciative of her work, saying Birds of Prey editor Lysa Hawkins "was looking for a slightly tougher Birds of Prey and asked me to submit a proposal. I have a huge fondness for Babs and Dinah both, so it's a bit of a dream come true. I'm really excited by the art, which is very sleek and sexy, with a nice dark tone, by Supergirl star Ed Benes".

The Huntress later meets Oracle in person for the first time while rescuing her from a potentially life threatening situation during the "Sensei & Student" storyline. The US government had become aware of the existence of Oracle and formatted a list of suspects to interrogate, one of whom was Barbara. Without any form of due process, two federal agents imply they believe she is the Oracle and that if any evidence is brought to light she will be tried for treason against the United States of America. Once again, Oracle relies on the Huntress when no other allies are available.

While Oracle and Huntress share a long history of animosity with one another, Black Canary eventually persuades Oracle to employ Huntress as a full-time agent. The budding friendship is cut short during the "Hero Hunters" arc. In the final issue of the storyline, the Huntress realizes Oracle has been manipulating her psychologically to make her "behave" properly, in the same way a teacher attempts to reform a troubled child. Despite Oracle's remorse for her actions, Huntress temporarily departs from the group. She later rejoins the team, once again as a full-time agent along with newcomer Lady Blackhawk. Although the personnel on Oracle's team grows and changes, Huntress and Lady Blackhawk remain core agents.

As Birds of Prey approached its hundredth issue, Simone used issues #99 and #100 to shake up the lineup. She let Black Canary leave the team with her ward, a little girl called "Sin", and used a prison break arc to introduce superhumanly strong Big Barda, pacifist Judomaster and rascally Misfit into the new squad, and with the new Spy Smasher as an ambiguous Jack Bauer-like anti-heroine and Lois Lane cornering Oracle into almost giving away her secret identity. Again, the characters were chosen to provide a foil for each other, and affirmed her love for her characters: "The team is a group of individuals, quite unlike the friendship between Dinah, Helena and Babs. And any team with Barda on it automatically has a certain bull in a China shop tremble, and I love that... The characters don't apologize for being asskickers, nor for being smart, nor for being sexy, nor for being sexual, for that matter. There are always going to be some people who find that not to their taste, but at the same time, Birds of Prey regularly brings in people who don't otherwise read mainstream comics, a whole audience that may not pick up any other superhero titles, and I love that niche, that little area between good taste and utter shamelessness". Finally, Simone stated her agony of leaving the book: "I miss the characters in all the books I've worked on. Writing the last issue of Birds of Prey I'm doing was actually physically painful".

=== Cancellation ===
After Simone's departure to sister title Wonder Woman, Sean McKeever wrote Birds of Prey from issues #113 to #117. McKeever used his short stint to pit a new incarnation of "Blackhawk" villain Killer Shark against ex-Blackhawk Zinda Blake and to introduce the location of Platinum Flats, called by IGN "the Silicon Valley of the DC universe and a hotbed of white-collar crime committed by mysterious villain 'The Visionary'". IGN called his short stint "enjoyable and creative". His writing deeds were taken over by Tony Bedard, who stated in a Comic Book Resources interview that he liked the concept of Platinum Flats. Bedard wanted to mix the concept of 21st century white collar crime with 1930s mob families and said that Oracle is his favorite Birds of Prey character.

DC canceled the series in February 2009, with the Oracle: The Cure mini-series beginning publication the following month as part of a company-wide reorganization of Batman-related titles.

=== Relaunch ===
Birds of Prey returned under the Brightest Day banner in 2010. Gail Simone returned to write series with Ed Benes providing the artwork. Hawk and Dove were brought as new members of the team as well, with Oracle playing a strictly supporting role.

The title was eventually cancelled along with every other DC book as part of The New 52, a company-wide relaunch following the Flashpoint event. Two months prior to the title's cancellation, Simone left the book after issue #13.

In July, writer Marc Andreyko and artist Billy Tucci took over the title for the final story-arc, which featured the original Black Canary and Phantom Lady. Manhunter, a former Birds of Prey member created by Andreyko, appeared as well.

=== Rebooted universe ===
DC Comics relaunched Birds of Prey with issue #1 in September 2011 for The New 52 relaunch with the new series having some similar characters which existed in a different universe than the previous DC titles. Novelist Duane Swierczynski replaced Andreyko as the writer, with Jesus Saiz handling the art. Noted Batman villain Poison Ivy was one of the new characters joining the team.

The book's first storyline begins shortly after Barbara regains the use of her legs after the events of Flashpoint. However, she still has been paralyzed by the Joker, but thanks to a new kind of implant, she can walk again. She has to deal with some PTSD, though. Dinah approaches her old friend with an offer to join the new Birds of Prey team she is putting together, but she declines, instead suggesting that Katana take her place. The gun-toting vigilante Starling is also recruited into the team, along with Poison Ivy.

Following the departure of Poison Ivy after issue #12, the team roster changed again when Katana spun off into her own solo book along with providing her services to the Justice League of America. With occasional help from Condor and a former Talon (an assassin of the Court of Owls), named Mary Turner, a young African-American woman who became mute after being injured by a Japanese Fu-Go balloon bomb attack when she was a little girl whilst the rest of her family was killed from the bombing during World War II and was recruited into the Court. In Batgirl Annual #1, Catwoman freed Mary from Blackgate Penitentiary, and Batgirl chose her to replace Katana after she left. The Birds of Prey gave her the codename Strix (Latin for Owl). The Birds of Prey moved on with writer Christy Marx in issue #18.

=== Batgirl and the Birds of Prey ===
DC Comics reconfigured the continuity of their shared universe again in 2016 with DC Rebirth. The Birds of Prey had their own title once again, now called Batgirl and the Birds of Prey. Huntress is aware of Batgirl and Black Canary's secret identities, but they do not seem to be aware of hers. The three women form an uneasy alliance to take down mutual foes. Batgirl and Black Canary are attempting to find yet another villain who is using the name "Oracle". Issue #4 is essentially Huntress's origin story, showing why she is waging war against certain mob families.

Brian Azzarello wrote a one-shot graphic novel, DC Black Label, in 2020, titled "Birds of Prey 1". Harley Quinn, who is just freed from prison after "serving" out her Suicide Squad time, encounters Black Canary and Huntress, who are battling The Word of the Lord Mexican drug cartel. The Joker's Gang is also looking for Harley.

=== Dawn of DC ===
In June 2023, it was announced that a new Birds of Prey ongoing series would launch on September 6, 2023 as a part of the Dawn of DC relaunch initiative. The series is written by Kelly Thompson, drawn by Leonardo Romero, colored by Jordie Bellaire, and lettered by Clayton Cowles. The initial line up for the first arc consists of Black Canary, Cassandra Cain / Batgirl, Big Barda, Zealot, and Harley Quinn.

== Membership ==
Birds of Prey team members from Birds of Prey volume 2 #1 by Ed Benes. From left to right: Huntress, Hawk and Dove, Lady Blackhawk, Black Canary, Oracle.

=== Main characters ===
Oracle/Batgirl (Barbara Gordon)
Barbara is the leader of the Birds of Prey. The former Batgirl and daughter of Batman's closest ally Jim Gordon, she was rendered paraplegic after being shot by Joker in Batman: The Killing Joke and reinvented herself as the hacker Oracle. In The New 52 reboot, Barbara regains the use of her legs and returns to the Batgirl identity, taking a temporary hiatus from the team in the process.
Black Canary (Dinah Lance)
A tough but good-natured and idealistic streetfighter who is the Birds of Prey's star martial artist. Barbara and Dinah are close friends, Barbara having helped Dinah through low periods in Dinah's life. In addition to her superpower, an ultrasonic attack known as the "Canary Cry", she is also a highly skilled martial artist. She departed the team in issue #99, and returned in issue #1 of volume 2.
Huntress (Helena Bertinelli)
A vigilante who declared war on the mafia after her family was killed in a mob hit when she was young. Following Black Canary's departure, Huntress became the team's field commander..
Lady Blackhawk (Zinda Blake)
A time-displaced 1940s character, Zinda served as the team's aviatrix and pilot of the Aerie One and Two. She is an expert sharpshooter and highly trained with various types of firearms.

=== Recurring characters ===
Big Barda (Barda Free)
A New God from the planet Apokolips and a former member of the Female Furies.
Black Alice (Lori Zechlin)
A magically powered anti-heroine who can temporarily borrow the powers of other magic users.
Blue Beetle (Ted Kord)
A former Justice Leaguer with a crush on Barbara. Kord is murdered in Countdown to Infinite Crisis, and the main characters visit his grave in Birds of Prey #96.
Catwoman (Selina Kyle)
A feline-styled anti-heroine, Selina has cooperated with the team on several operations, the most notable of which was a starring role in the Birds of Prey: Manhunt mini-series.
Cassandra Cain
The daughter of assassin David Cain and Lady Shiva, In pre-Flashpoint DC continuity, Cain was the third Batgirl.
Cheshire
An expert martial artist and toxicologist who is a recurring enemy of the Birds of Prey. Despite this, she has worked with the group on several occasions.
Condor (Benjamin Reyes)
A male vigilante who opposed the Birds of Prey before joining the team in a 2012 story. A former National Security Agency analyst, Benjamin Reyes later manifested telekinetic abilities, which he learned to use to control a set of mechanical wings.
Creote
A former KGB agent, Creote is a devoted servant and only friend to Savant. The two are later revealed to be in a gay relationship.
Dove (Dawn Granger)
A strong-willed but calm young woman, and the avatar of peace. A former member of the Teen Titans, Dove was granted superhuman strength, durability, and reflexes by the Lords of Chaos and Order, and used them to fight alongside Hank Hall. Following the events of the Blackest Night crossover, Dawn was invited to join the Birds.
Gypsy (Cindy Reynolds)
Once a member of Justice League Detroit, Gypsy debuts as an agent for Oracle at the end of Birds of Prey #92. She is a metahuman whose powers include creating illusions, camouflaging herself and others near her to blend into any background.
Hawk (Hank Hall)
A violent and conservative young man, and the avatar of war. Granted superhuman abilities by the Lords of Chaos and Order, Hawk fought crime alongside his brother Don and later Dawn, before being driven insane by the wizard Mordru and becoming the villain Extant. After his murder at the hands of Atom Smasher, Hank was resurrected in Blackest Night. During the Brightest Day follow-up crossover, he was offered an invitation to join the team.
Hawkgirl (Kendra Saunders)
Oracle first solicits her assistance in issue #104 in dealing with the Secret Six, for which Oracle rewards her with a car. Throughout the Russian arc, Hawkgirl serves as a team member and develops a rivalry with Secret Six member Scandal Savage.
Ice (Tora Olafsdotter)
A Nordic metahuman with ice-related abilities and a former Justice League International member, who was believed dead until discovered by the team in Russia.
Infinity
A new character who appeared towards near the end of Volume One, Infinity debuted in Birds of Prey #120, and was described by Oracle as a "new operative" in #121, though it is implied she may have worked for Oracle in the past as well. Infinity has the ability to make her body intangible, but little else is known about her. In issue #125, Infinity reveals to Huntress that she can read the residual memory of a corpse as long as its brain is intact, and that she has to make physical contact for that power to operate. Huntress asked where her phasing ability originated, and was told it was due to a curse.
Jade Canary (Sandra Wu-San)
The assassin more commonly known as Lady Shiva took Dinah's spot on the Birds of Prey team as of "One Year Later", calling herself the Jade Canary. After the conditions behind the switch she arranged with the Black Canary were met, she left the team. In a final act, she acquired a new apprentice to train in the form of Bethany Thorne, Crime Doctor's daughter.
Josh
A rental car agent who bargained with Huntress for information in exchange for a date. After reluctantly agreeing and (surprisingly) sleeping with him, Huntress has used Josh as an agent in some of her easier tasks against the mob.
Judomaster (Sonia Sato)
In issue #100, a new female Judomaster joins the Birds of Prey after being invited by Oracle. This character would be expanded on by later writers, starting with Justice Society of America.
Katana (Tatsu Yamashiro)
A skilled swordswoman and martial artist from Japan, who wields the enchanted Soultaker Sword. She first assisted the team in rescuing Oracle from Senator Pullman, after which Oracle gave her a card and the promise of a favor if ever required. After Oracle returned to the Batgirl identity, she suggested Katana as a full-time recruit.
Manhunter (Kate Spencer)
In issue #100, Manhunter joins the Birds of Prey after being invited by Oracle, following Canary's resignation. She has stayed on as a core member. Kate Spencer is a vigilante of a more violent sort than her teammates. In her civilian identity, she is a federal prosecutor who became sickened to see criminals escape punishment via the judicial system. Using stolen weapons, Manhunter elects to hunt down and if necessary kill supervillains herself.
Misfit (Charlotte Gage-Radcliffe)
A teenage orphan with teleportation powers, her persistent appearances (first as a wannabe Batgirl and then as Misfit) are initially a nuisance to Oracle, although Barbara's attitude gradually softens. After Barbara discovers her homelessness and personal tragedy, she formally invites her to become a member of the Birds. As of Birds of Prey vol. 2, #1, she is no longer a member of the team and now lives with a foster family.
Nightwing (Dick Grayson)
A dashing crimefighter and the original Robin, Dick enjoyed a mutual teenage crush on Barbara that once blossomed into a steamy romance, but has crumbled despite continued strong feelings on both sides. Barbara and Dick later reconciled.
Poison Ivy (Pamela Isley)
A noted eco-terrorist and enemy of Batman. She was recruited to the team by Black Canary early in the series' New 52 run, a decision that did not sit well with the other members. She possesses powerful pheromones that make people susceptible to mind control, as well as the ability to conjure sentient plants that can attack and restrain enemies. Eventually, it was revealed that she only joined the group to manipulate them into fulfilling her own dark agenda, and she left upon being exposed and defeated by the other members.
Power Girl (Karen Starr/Kara Zor-L)
Power Girl was Oracle's first operative, before she took in Black Canary. This first partnership was doomed, since Power Girl was unable to save a shipload of people. She has worked occasionally with Oracle in subsequent episodes but the two have a very poor relationship; she was invited to return to the team in issue #100, but stated she would do so "when Hell freezes over", despite begrudgingly appearing before and since to assist Oracle. The animosity between them is the opposite of the traditional Batgirl/Supergirl friendship.
Savant (Brian Durlin)
The spoiled heir to an enormous fortune, Savant moved to Gotham to become a self-styled vigilante. After kidnapping and brutally torturing Black Canary, he was defeated by the Birds. Oracle made the questionable decision to rehabilitate him, mainly to keep his data files on hundreds of real villains. As his name would suggest, he is a genius, but due to a chemical imbalance he exhibits a non-linear memory. Savant has also exhibited feelings for Oracle, probably rooted in his envy of her computer skills. Later, however, he is shown to reciprocate Creote's romantic feelings for him as well.
Secret Six
Following their initial appearance, members of the Secret Six have appeared repeatedly in Birds of Prey. The team composed of Catman, Deadshot, Rag Doll, Scandal Savage, Knockout, and Harley Quinn act as foils to the Birds on one shared mission. Catman and Huntress are potential romantic interests, Scandal finds an enemy in Hawkgirl, and Barda and Knockout have a longstanding rivalry.
Strix (Mary Turner)
Originally known as Mary Turner, Strix is a former Talon—a member of the Court of Owls, a clandestine order of reanimated assassins based in Gotham City—who first appeared in the Batgirl series. Deadly, mute, and endearing, Strix replaced Batgirl on the team at Batgirl's direction in a 2012 story.
Spy Smasher (Katarina Armstrong)
An old college rival of Oracle's, Spy Smasher boasts a significant number of government and intelligence connections which she uses to manipulate Barbara. Trying to usurp Oracle's team, the two come to confrontation over the status of the Birds of Prey. She is also an expert sharpshooter.
Starling (Ev Crawford)
A spirited, gun-toting vigilante introduced at the start of volume 2, following DC's 2011 reboot. Not much is known about her backstory, other than that she is a close friend of Black Canary and the first recruit added to the new team. She later betrayed the team to Mr. Freeze.
Vixen (Mari Jiwe McCabe)
An international supermodel and former Justice League and Suicide Squad member, Mari was born in Africa. She inherited her family's "Tantu" totem, a necklace granting the wearer the ability to channel the skills/abilities of any animal. Vixen has been a field agent for Oracle, accompanying Huntress to the Pacific Northwest to stop a metahuman-worshipping cult.
Wildcat (Ted Grant)
A former professional boxer and current member of the Justice Society, Ted serves as a mentor to Dinah and has helped her on several missions.
Zealot (Zannah of Khera)
A warrior of the Coda Sisterhood and member of the WildC.A.T.s, Zealot joins the team in the Dawn of DC to assist in the rescue of Cynthia Lance.

== Collected editions ==
The series has been collected into a number of trade paperbacks published by DC Comics.

Title	Material collected	Publication date	ISBN
Birds of Prey	Black Canary/Oracle: Birds of Prey #1, Birds of Prey: Manhunt #1–4, Birds of Prey: Revolution #1, a story from Showcase '96 #3	2002	978-1563894848
Birds of Prey: Old Friends, New Enemies	Birds of Prey: Wolves #1, Bird of Prey: Batgirl #1, Birds of Prey #1–6	2003	978-1563899393
Nightwing: The Hunt for Oracle	Birds of Prey #20–21	2003	978-1563899409
Batman: New Gotham, Vol. 2: Officer Down	Birds of Prey #27	2001	978-1563897870
Batman: Bruce Wayne – Murderer?	Birds of Prey #39–40	2002	978-1563899133
Batman: Bruce Wayne – Fugitive, Vol. 1	Birds of Prey #41, 43	2002	978-1563899331
Birds of Prey: Of Like Minds	Birds of Prey #56–61	2004	978-1401201920
Birds of Prey: Sensei and Student	Birds of Prey #62–68	2005	978-1401204341
Birds of Prey: Between Dark and Dawn	Birds of Prey #69–75	2006	978-1401209407
Birds of Prey: The Battle Within	Birds of Prey #76–85	2006	978-1401210960
Birds of Prey: Perfect Pitch	Birds of Prey #86–90, #92–95	2007	978-1401211912
Birds of Prey: Blood and Circuits	Birds of Prey #96–103	2007	978-1401213718
Birds of Prey: Dead of Winter	Birds of Prey #104–108	2008	978-1401216412
Birds of Prey: Club Kids	Birds of Prey #109–112, #118	2009	978-1401221751
Birds of Prey: Metropolis or Dust	Birds of Prey #113–117	2009	978-1401219628
Birds of Prey: Platinum Flats	Birds of Prey #119–124	2009	978-1401222932
Oracle: The Cure	Birds of Prey #126–127, Oracle: The Cure #1–3	2010	978-1401226039
Birds of Prey: End Run	Birds of Prey Vol. 2 #1–6	2011	978-1401231316
Birds of Prey: The Death of Oracle	Birds of Prey Vol. 2 #7–15	2011	978-1401232757
DC Comics: The Sequential Art of Amanda Conner	Birds of Prey Vol. 1 #47–49	2012	978-1401237400
Birds of Prey Vol. 1	Black Canary/Oracle: Birds of Prey #1, Birds of Prey: Manhunt #1–4, Birds of Prey: Revolution #1, a story from Showcase '96 #3, Birds of Prey: Wolves #1, Bird of Prey: Batgirl #1	2015	978-1401258160
Birds of Prey Vol. 2	Birds of Prey Vol. 1 #1–11, Birds of Prey: Ravens #1	2016	978-1401260958
Nightwing Vol. 5	Birds of Prey Vol. 1 #20–21, Nightwing #35–46	2016	978-1401264543
Birds of Prey Vol. 3	Birds of Prey Vol. 1 #12–21, Nightwing #45–46	2017	978-1401264543
Batman: Bruce Wayne – Murderer?	Birds of Prey Vol. 1 #39–41	2014	978-1401246839
Batman: Bruce Wayne – Fugitive	Birds of Prey Vol. 1 #43	2014	978-1401246822
Birds of Prey: Murder and Mystery	Birds of Prey Vol. 1 #56–67	2020	978-1401295844
Birds of Prey: Hero Hunters	Batgirl #57, Batman #633, Birds of Prey Vol. 1 #68–80	2021	978-1779503046
Birds of Prey: Fighters by Trade	Birds of Prey Vol. 1 #81-91	2021	978-1779508027
Birds of Prey: Progeny	Birds of Prey Vol. 1 #92-103	2024	978-1779525765
Birds of Prey: Whitewater	Birds of Prey Vol. 1 #104-112	2022	978-1779515766
Birds of Prey: The End of the Beginning	Birds of Prey Vol. 1 #113-127	2023	978-1779521521
The New 52
Birds of Prey Vol. 1: Trouble in Mind	Birds of Prey Vol. 3 #1–7	2012	978-1401236991
Birds of Prey Vol. 2: Your Kiss Might Kill	Birds of Prey Vol. 3 #8–12, #0	2013	978-1401238131
Birds of Prey Vol. 3: A Clash of Daggers	Birds of Prey Vol. 3 #13–17; Batgirl Annual Vol. 4 #1	2013	978-1401244040
Birds of Prey Vol. 4: The Cruelest Cut	Birds of Prey Vol. 3 #18–24, 26, Talon #9	2014	978-1401246358
Birds of Prey Vol. 5: Soul Crisis	Birds of Prey Vol. 3 #25, 27–34	2015	978-1401250836
DC Rebirth
Batgirl and the Birds of Prey Vol. 1: Who Is Oracle?	Batgirl and the Birds of Prey: Rebirth #1, Batgirl and the Birds of Prey #1–6	2017	978-1401268671
Batgirl and the Birds of Prey Vol. 2: Source Code	Batgirl and the Birds of Prey #7–13	2017	978-1401273804
Batgirl and the Birds of Prey Vol. 3: Full Circle	Batgirl and the Birds of Prey #14–22	2018	978-1401277819
DC All In
Birds of Prey Vol. 1: Megadeath	Birds of Prey Vol. 4 #1–6	2024	978-1779525581
Birds of Prey Vol. 2: Worlds Without End	Birds of Prey Vol. 4 #7–13	2025	978-1779528575
Birds of Prey Vol. 3: Bird Undercover	Birds of Prey Vol. 4 #14–19	2025	978-1799501190
Birds of Prey Vol. 4: On the Run	Birds of Prey Vol. 4 #20-28	2026	978-1799505693

- Issues #22–26, #28–38, #42, #44–46 and #50–55 of volume 1 have yet to be collected into volumes.

== In other media ==
=== Television ===
- The Birds of Prey appear in a self-titled TV series, consisting of Helena Kyle / Huntress (portrayed by Ashley Scott), Barbara Gordon / Oracle (portrayed by Dina Meyer), and Dinah Redmond (portrayed by Rachel Skarsten).
- The Birds of Prey were intended to appear in the Justice League Unlimited episode "Double Date", consisting of Barbara Gordon / Batgirl, Huntress, and Black Canary. However, a character rights issue necessitated Gordon being removed and Huntress and Black Canary instead working separately with the Question and Green Arrow respectively.
- The Birds of Prey appear in the Batman: The Brave and the Bold episode "The Mask of Matches Malone!", consisting of the Huntress, Black Canary, and Catwoman. The episode attracted controversy after airing in Australia due to the song "Birds of Prey", which contained suggestive lyrics. As a result, the episode's U.S. airing was delayed so that it could edited to meet Broadcast Standards and Practices. Executive producer James Tucker described the number as a "Cole Porter-type song... fun, sophisticated and with clever wordplay" and stated that ultimately, he was pleased with the edit.
- The Birds of Prey TV series incarnations of Helena Kyle and Barbara Gordon make cameo appearances in "Crisis on Infinite Earths", portrayed again by Ashley Scott while Dina Meyer provides uncredited vocals.

=== Film ===
Screenshot of the Birds of Prey from the 2020 film (L-R: Rosie Perez as Renee Montoya, Mary Elizabeth Winstead as Huntress, Margot Robbie as Harley Quinn, Ella Jay Basco as Cassandra Cain and Jurnee Smollett-Bell as Black Canary.

The Birds of Prey appear in a self-titled film, consisting of Dinah Lance (portrayed by Jurnee Smollett-Bell), Helena Bertinelli / Huntress (Mary Elizabeth Winstead), and Renee Montoya (Rosie Perez). Additionally, Harley Quinn (portrayed by Margot Robbie) and Cassandra Cain (Ella Jay Basco) appear as temporary allies before they part ways with the trio on good terms.
