= Lady Blackhawk =

- Lady Blackhawk as seen in Birds of Prey #75 (December 2004)

Publication information
- Publisher: DC Comics
- First appearance: Blackhawk #133 (February 1959)
- Created by: Jack Schiff; Dick Dillin

In-story information
- Alter ego: Zinda Blake
- Species: Human
- Team affiliations: Blackhawks; United Nations; Birds of Prey
- Partnerships: Huntress (Helena Bertinelli); Oracle (Barbara Gordon)
- Supporting character of: Guy Gardner
- Notable aliases: Queen Killer Shark
- Abilities: Ace pilot; Skilled hand-to-hand combatant and marksman

Lady Blackhawk is a codename used by various female characters appearing in American comic books published by DC Comics. Throughout the publication history of the character, the original and subsequent versions served under different incarnations of the Blackhawks team, differing in objective and background but are notable women within the team.

The original and primary version is Zinda Blake, who trained herself in aviation and combat to become the first enlisted member of the Blackhawk Squadron, despite their prohibition against females, as an honorary member. Following Zero Hour, the character is displaced through time from 1959 to the 21st century, eventually serving as a member of the Birds of Prey, an all-female crime-fighting team. Several others have used the codename, including Captain Natalie Reed, the retroactive original and flight engineer who helped design their trademark fighter plane. An unnamed Lady Blackhawk appeared as a field team leader of the Blackhawks Program, a covert black-ops unit and modern iteration of the team. Kendra Saunders would be the fourth version of the character, serving in an iteration of the team that acted as a covert anti-apocalypse team as the team leader years before becoming the hero Hawkgirl.

== Publication history ==
Sometime after acquiring the Blackhawk title from Quiality Comics, Jack Schiff and Dick Dillin created the Zinda Blake version of Lady Blackhawk to add a female character to the Blackhawk cast. Since her inception, the character made sporadic appearances in Blackhawk, which became one of the best-selling DC Comics titles not related to Superman or Batman. In 2004, Lady Blackhawk began appearing as a reoccurring character in the series Birds of Prey.

== Characterization ==
=== Description and motivation ===
During her native time period in World War II, the characters' motivation was to join the famous Blackhawk Squadron (or the Blackhawks) as its first female member.

=== Fictional character biography ===
Zinda Blake, the first Lady Blackhawk, was introduced in Blackhawk #133 (February 1959). Blake, determined to become the first female member of the famed World War II unit known as the Blackhawks, trained herself in aviation and combat. However, she is told that the Blackhawk codes forbid women from joining the team. Despite this, Blake is made an honorary member of the Blackhawks after rescuing them from the Scavenger, a pirate-themed criminal.

After a number of adventures with the Blackhawks, Blake is brainwashed by Nazi operative Killer Shark, forcing her to take up the identity of Queen Killer Shark. Blake battles the Blackhawks a number of times as Killer Shark's accomplice before she is freed of the effects of the potion.

During the storyline Zero Hour: Crisis in Time!, Blake is transported to the present day, looking as she did in 1959. Blake and Guy Gardner have adventures in various time periods, such as the Wild West and far future. Blake is later transported to Warrior's, a nightclub that serves as a front for Gardner's latest heroic endeavors. Blake is instantly accepted by Gardner and offered a place to live. She appears as a supporting character in the series Guy Gardner, Warrior, often serving as a pilot for Gardner's team.

In 2004, Blake is recruited into the Birds of Prey as a pilot. Flashbacks reveal that the other Blackhawks have died and that Blake has been struggling with Blackhawk Inc. an international shipping company which she owns one-eighth of. Blake accepts the job with Black Canary's unofficial group on the grounds she is in full control of any flying duties. Blake resigns from the Birds of Prey in the issue #107 rather than see Barbara Gordon forced to dismiss her under orders from the group's new leader, Spy Smasher. She later comes to Gordon's aid and rejoins the team, which is restored to Gordon's command.

=== Skills and abilities ===
The characters' official abilities and background define her as a self-trained ace pilot able to handle any form of aircraft, a capable markswoman with a variety of weaponry, and is a superior hand-to-hand combatant.

== Reception ==
Lady Blackhawk was ranked 48th in Comics Buyer's Guide's "100 Sexiest Women in Comics" list, although the list does not specify which version of the character was chosen.

== Other versions ==
- An alternate timeline version of Zinda Blake appears in Flashpoint: Lois Lane and the Resistance as a member of Team-7 who is later killed.
- A team of Lady Blackhawks appear in Multiversity: Society of Super-Heroes #1, consisting of Lena, Killah, Pixie, Red, Monkey, and Princess.

=== Other Lady Blackhawks ===
Other Lady Blackhawks in DC Comcs. Left to right: Natalie Reed, unnamed Lady Blackhawk, and Kendra Saunders.

- Natalie Reed (born Natalie Gurdin), the second Lady Blackhawk, was introduced in the 1988 miniseries Blackhawk, which was written and drawn by Howard Chaykin. Within the DC Comics universe, Reed is retroactively the first Lady Blackhawk, having worked with the Blackhawks since 1943. Natalie Gurdin is the daughter of Benjamin and Lucille Gurdin, members of the Communist Party USA. She later changed her surname to Reed in honor of John Reed, a journalist who supported the Communist cause. Reed emigrated to Russia in 1940, becoming an aeronautical engineer. Reed contributed to the creation of the modified Grumman XF5F Skyrocket used by the Blackhawks. Later, while working with Soviet intelligence, she helps defeat Death Mayhew in his plot to destroy Manhattan. During this period, Reed is dubbed "Lady Blackhawk" by the U.S. press. As a result of internal strife in the 1950s within the ranks of the CIA, which the Blackhawk Squadron was informally allied with, Reed is surgically altered and forced to assume the identity of Constance Darabont.
- A new version of Lady Blackhawk debuted in September 2011's Blackhawks #1 as part of DC's The New 52 initiative.
- Kendra Saunders temporarily assumes the identity of Lady Blackhawk in Dark Nights: Metal #1, where she is the leader of the Blackhawks, an anti-apocalyptic team that wants to prevent the Dark Multiverse from rising.

== In other media ==
A group of Lady Blackhawks appear in Batman: The Brave and the Bold #21.
