= Huntress (Helena Bertinelli) =

DC Comics antiheroine

The Huntress
- Helena Bertinelli as depicted in Nightwing (2016) #26. Art by Javi Fernandez and Chris Sotomayor.

Publication information
- Publisher: DC Comics
- First appearance: As Huntress: The Huntress #1 (April 1989); As Batgirl: Batman: Shadow of the Bat #83 (March 1999); As Matron: Nightwing (vol. 3) #30 (July 2014)
- Created by: Joey Cavalieri; Joe Staton

In-story information
- Alter ego: Helena Rosa Bertinelli
- Species: Human
- Team affiliations: Justice League; Birds of Prey; Bertinelli Crime Family; Batman Family; Justice League; Outsiders; Spyral
- Partnerships: Barbara Gordon; Black Canary; Dick Grayson; The Question (various)
- Notable aliases: Batgirl; Matron; Helena Janice Bertinelli; The Crossbow Killer
- Abilities: Expert martial artist and markswoman with proficiency in a range of weaponry, including a crossbow; Expert in espionage, acrobatics, stealth, and disguise; Can see precognitive vision of violent crimes

Helena Rosa Bertinelli is an antiheroine appearing in American comic books published by DC Comics. The third character to use the Huntress codename and once a claimant to Batgirl, she was introduced as a new interpretation of Helena Wayne as part of DC's post-Crisis on Infinite Earths relaunch. She was later established to be the modern-day equivalent, namesake, and predecessor of Helena Wayne. Originally sharing a similar design to Wayne, the character's look was later updated in 2014 to give her a darker skin tone to differentiate the two characters.

A Sicilian-descended teacher and vigilante whose origins mirrors those of Batman but utilizes lethal force; the daughter of an infamous Mafia boss in Gotham City, her parents and brothers are gunned down by a rival family with her as the sole survivor. She is then trained in martial arts and archery by other relatives and allies in Sicily. As an adult and desiring revenge, she begins her career as a vigilante first targeting mafia mobsters and then super-villains, clashing with Batman and various allies due to her lethal methods. While a reluctant ally of the Batman Family, the character has also served in several teams such as the Justice League International, Outsiders, and serves as a reoccurring member of the Birds of Prey. After the New 52, the character also once served as the high-ranking super-spy codenamed Matron, a field operative, partner to Agent 37 (Dick Grayson), and instructor in Spyral until Minos' corrupt leadership became apparent, leading her to take command of the organization for a time until she parted ways and returned to her vigilante life.

Huntress has been adapted into numerous media outside comics, including television series and films. Tara Strong and Amy Acker voice the character in Batman: The Brave and the Bold and Justice League Unlimited respectively, while Jessica De Gouw and Mary Elizabeth Winstead portray Huntress in Arrow and Birds of Prey (and the Fantabulous Emancipation of One Harley Quinn) respectively.

== Publication history ==
Helena Bertinelli was introduced in The Huntress #1 (April 1989), written by Joey Cavalieri and drawn by Joe Staton, co-creator and long-time artist of the Helena Wayne Huntress. Staton recalled, "I think Paul [Levitz] realized that I felt my involvement with Helena had been abruptly cut short [by the events of Crisis on Infinite Earths], so I was always in line to be a part of any reworking of the character. I don't recall how Joey Cavalieri came to be the writer on the Helena Bertinelli version, but I think we did some nice work on that run. Helena Bertinelli could never have the deep resonance of Helena Wayne, because she didn't have the whole Batman/Catwoman backstory at her command, but Joey worked her into a different mythos, that of the mob, also dark, noirish".

== Fictional character biography ==
=== Origin ===
==== Huntress series ====
Helena Bertinelli as the Huntress, in her original costume, as she appeared on a panel from a page of The Huntress #9 (October 1989). Art by the character's co-creator Joe Staton (pencils) and Bob Smith (inks), and Robbie Busch (colors).

In the 1989 Huntress series, Helena Bertinelli was born into one of New York City's most prominent mafia families. In this iteration of the character, she was kidnapped as a child (aged 6) by a rival mafia Don purely to psychologically torture her father. Her parents, Guido and Carmela, send her to a boarding school and assign a bodyguard for her protection where she learns all forms of combat. After she witnesses the mob-ordered murder of her parents at the age of 19, she crusades to put an end to the Mafia. She travels, accompanied and trained by her bodyguard Sal, before returning to New York to make her debut as the Huntress.

==== Cry for Blood ====
Huntress' origin was revised in 2000 in the six-issue Batman/Huntress: Cry for Blood limited series written by Greg Rucka, art by Rick Burchett and Terry Beatty. Helena Rosa Bertinelli witnesses the murder of her entire family in their home when she is aged 8; a young Helena believes Franco Bertinelli to be her father, but her father is actually Santo Casamento, the don of a rival mafia family, who was carrying on an affair with Helena's mother, Maria. Helena is framed for two murders, which puts her in direct conflict with Batman and Nightwing. In an extended retreat with Richard Dragon and Vic Sage (Question), she tries to achieve better emotional balance, returning to Gotham City to confront her true father and learn more about her family's murder. She faces a choice between the more ethical woman she is becoming and the earlier Helena, who still hears the vengeance call as "blood cries for blood".

==== Huntress: Year One ====
Huntress starred in her own six-issue biweekly Year One miniseries from May to July 2008 by Ivory Madison and Cliff Richards. The story recounts and expands upon the beginning of Helena's vigilante career. She is in Sicily, days from turning 21 and receiving the inheritance from the murder of her family, which occurred before her eyes when she was eight years old. Learning more about her family's murder at the hands of boss Stefano Mandragora, Helena adopts a costume disguise and weaponry to seek revenge, confronting not only the men who ordered her family's death but the assassin himself.

In the process, she establishes herself as angrier and more violent than a standard costumed hero, foreshadowing the conflicts with more mainstream heroes, predominantly Batman. She crosses paths with Barbara Gordon (destined, like Oracle, to be a close friend and colleague), Catwoman, and Batman, who will become partial mentor, partial antagonist during her subsequent career as a Gotham superhero. She states that her compulsion derives from the moment before her family was murdered when she believes she could have acted to save them. The story ends with her renouncing the Bertinelli legacy of crime and "baptizing" herself as Huntress.

=== Relationship with Batman ===
Batman rarely accepts the Huntress, regarding her as unpredictable and violent. However, when Commissioner Gordon questions Batman about his attitude towards the Huntress, Batman replies, "You know exactly why I don't approve...You're not the only one she reminds of Barbara", in reference to Barbara Gordon, who had previously fought crime as Batgirl. Others in the Batman family feel differently; for instance, Tim Drake has a good relationship with her. Early in his career, he works with the female vigilante and later clears her name in a murder case.

Huntress is briefly involved with the Justice League International when she happens upon a brainwashed Blue Beetle attempting to murder Maxwell Lord. The League is impressed and asks her to join. Although League members help her on one of her own cases and she gets a tour of the group's New York City embassy, she never officially joins the team.

During the League's restructuring following the Rock of Ages crisis, Batman sponsors Huntress' membership in the Justice League, hoping that the influence of other heroes will mellow the Huntress, and for some time, Huntress is a respected member of the League. Under the guidance of heroes such as Superman, Helena grows in confidence, even playing a key role in defeating Solaris during the DC One Million storyline; inspired by the time capsules students in her class had been making, she realizes they had over 800 centuries to set up a plan that would result in Solaris's defeat in the future. She also helps the League defeat foes like Prometheus and encourages Green Lantern to fight Queen Bee's hypno-pollen during her invasion of Earth. She is later forced to resign after Batman stops her from killing Prometheus while he is incapacitated.

=== Career in Gotham ===
==== No Man's Land ====
In the 1999 No Man's Land storyline, an earthquake levels Gotham City. The United States government declares Gotham a "No Man's Land" and Batman disappears. To bring order to the city, Huntress assumes the mantle of Batgirl, and she discovers criminals fear her more as Batgirl than they do as Huntress. Batgirl fails to protect Batman's territory from Two-Face and his gang, leading to an argument between her and Batman. Huntress refuses to follow Batman's exact orders and gives up the Batgirl costume.

Huntress teams with former police officer Petit and his men, who had broken off from the group led by former commissioner James Gordon. Petit believed that extreme force was the only way to survive No Man's Land. Batman intentionally drove Huntress to join Petit, knowing she could keep Petit in line and prevent him from hurting innocent people. On Christmas Eve, Joker attacks Petit's compound. Petit is killed and Huntress stands her ground, barely surviving the attack as the Joker and his men overrun the compound. Batman and Nightwing intervene in time and Huntress is taken to a field hospital operated by forces who want to rebuild Gotham City.

==== Birds of Prey and the Outsiders ====
The Huntress, on the cover of Birds of Prey #57 (September 2003). Art by Ed Benes.

Huntress becomes involved with Oracle and Black Canary in the comic series Birds of Prey. She bonds with Black Canary when they oppose a man called Braun, who had seduced and left them both. Huntress continues to work with the group, although her relationship with Oracle is strained and sometimes antagonistic due to Huntress' recklessness and Barbara's controlling nature.

She is made one of Oracle's full-time agents in Birds of Prey #68, after responding immediately to Barbara's intercepted call for help (intended for Dinah Lance). With two active agents on rotation, the lighter workload allows for Oracle to set up day jobs for Huntress and Black Canary; as an elementary school teacher and florist, respectively. The realization of her childhood dream of teaching gives Helena a great sense of fulfillment and inspires her stronger sense of protectiveness. For a time her straightforwardness continues to put her at odds with Barbara and even the accommodating Dinah, but eventually, her selflessness and desire to help her colleagues without hesitation win their trust, and she becomes a valued and integral member of the team.

During the Birds of Prey "Hero Hunters" arc, Huntress realizes Oracle has been manipulating her psychologically to make her "behave" properly, in the same way, a teacher attempts to reform a troubled child and leaves the group. She later rejoins along with newcomer Lady Blackhawk who becomes another core member for the team. Upon Black Canary's departure of the team in Birds of Prey #99, Huntress becomes Oracle's most senior and trusted operative and field commander.

Huntress appeared in the Hush storyline. She saves Batman's life from a criminal gang after he suffers a fractured skull in a fall. Batman realizes that she is "so much like I was when I started out", and "she's better than she knows..." In the story, Huntress continues a feud with The Scarecrow. She later appears with a new costume and equipment, paid for by Thomas Elliot. While under the influence of Scarecrow's fear toxin, she fights Catwoman, thinking her to be her old self and wants to be more like the Dark Knight.

Huntress is asked to fill in an empty spot for the Outsiders after Arsenal sustains major injuries on a mission. She leaves the team after just one mission.

==== One Year Later ====
Huntress, as she appeared on the cover of Birds of Prey. #123 (December 2008); art by Rafael Albuquerque

In 2006, the narratives of most DC Comics superhero series skipped one year. In the One Year Later stories, Huntress works with Oracle's group. With Black Canary's departure from the team (issue #99), in issue #100 Huntress becomes the team's field commander.

Huntress later returns to Gotham after the Birds disband, aiding Cassandra Cain in maintaining order after Gotham descends into chaos during the midst of the Battle for the Cowl event.

Joined by Lady Blackhawk and Grace Choi, Huntress later assists her then love interest Catman and his team the Secret Six in a massive supervillain battle to steal Neron's Get Out of Hell Free Card.

==== Brightest Day ====
In Brightest Day, Oracle gathers the Birds of Prey back together in Gotham. In addition to getting the band back together, Oracle adds Hawk and Dove to the team. Huntress aids Black Canary (who had now left the Justice League), in a battle against a new villainess calling herself the White Canary. The Birds soon strike up an uneasy alliance with the Penguin, who ultimately betrays them and severely injures Zinda and Hawk. He attempts to kill Huntress as well, but she and Dove easily defeat him. While Dove takes Hawk and Zinda to a hospital, Huntress binds and gags the Penguin with duct tape, intending to take the villain prisoner to interrogate him. After being informed by Oracle that she has to leave the Penguin behind, Huntress considers murdering him in cold blood, but instead opts to leave him alive.

==== Convergence ====
During the Convergence event, Helena Bertinelli is featured as a main character in a story set in a Gotham City that has been trapped under a mysterious dome for a year. She stars alongside the Renee Montoya version of the Question and Batwoman (Kate Kane).

Helena is living in a shared apartment with Renee. She expresses worry and suspicion when Renee works with Harvey Dent (Two-Face) to acquire medical supplies, reminding Renee that Two-Face is not to be trusted. At the end of the series, when Renee's father dies (after they reconcile), Helena and Kate are there to comfort her.

Kate feels a pang of jealousy upon noticing that Helena and Renee, her ex-girlfriend, are in a relationship, which is fully confirmed some time later, outside the Convergence storyline, when Helena and Renee share a passionate kiss.

=== The New 52 ===
In September 2011, The New 52 rebooted DC's continuity. In the relaunch issue of Worlds' Finest, the Huntress is Helena Wayne from Earth 2. The Helena Bertinelli existed, but was believed dead, with Helena Wayne taking on the supposedly-deceased Bertinelli's identity.

Helena Bertinelli of Earth Prime on the cover of Grayson Annual #1 (February 2015), art by Mikel Janín.

The series Grayson, written by Tim Seeley and Tom King and released in 2014 revealed a new Prime Earth Helena Bertinelli in The New 52 continuity, appearing in the series as a spy and partner of Dick Grayson. Prime Earth's Helena Bertinelli is revealed to be an agent of the organization Spyral, who is presumed dead by the outside world. This incarnation of the character is a dark skinned Italian-American woman to keep readers from confusing her with Helena Wayne of Earth 2 according to Grayson series writer Tim Seeley. Her origin is expanded on in Grayson Annual #1 (February 2015). Helena is described as "the most wanted woman in the world", the granddaughter of Frank Bertinelli and the heir to "the entire Sicilian mob", who "disappeared" five years ago; her disappearance is legendary among criminals.

In the Agent of Spyral storyline she is the Matron of St. Hadrian's Boarding School for girls and a teacher herself. She rescues Leslie Thompsons from a raid by the Der Faust Die Kane (translating to "The Fist of Cain"), a depopulation terrorist cult made up of serial killers and hitmen. During an interrogation, both the director of Spyral Minos and Helena learn of Batman's secret identity. Later, she is the individual that picks Dick Grayson as a candidate to join Spyral. Minos then enlists Dick Grayson as Agent 37 and Helena's partner. Both are tasked with the duty of retrieving the Paragon Organs, which formerly belonged to Paragon. Each organ grants a different power of the Justice League, but these organs are also highly sought by other intelligence organizations such as A.R.G.U.S and Checkmate. Both she and her partner encounter Midnighter, who attempts to foil Spyral's current agenda.

Minos sends Helena and Dick to retrieve Paragon's brain, which holds Martian Manhunter's telepathic abilities, but they are too late. Dick later disappears and Helena learns that the Fist of Cain took the Brain and plans to attack a peace rally in Tel Aviv and force people to kill each other. As she makes her way to Tel Aviv, she later learns of her partner's fate with the use of Spyral's immense technological capabilities with Hypnos and informs them to send the current plans to Midnighter. As she arrives, she finds herself under psychic attack and due to the stress of previously using Hypnos to interrogate and locate her lost partner, she overworks herself. Dick and Midnighter assist. As Helena does her best to stop the crowd from killing each other, she ends up nearly killed by the Fist of Cain's leader, Christian Fleisher. She is saved by what appears to be Mister Minos. After the plan is foiled and Spyral retrieves the brain, she comments that she had various memory gaps from overworking herself mentally. Later, as part of Minos's endgame to out the secrets of Spyral, he shoots her with her own crossbow in an attempt to kill her. She survives and informs Grayson of Minos's plan to kill fellow Spyral Agent 1 (also "Tiger"). After Grayson rescues Agent 1, she reappears and seemingly kills the Minos, unaware that she actually killed a light composite of the real thing.

Helena Bertinelli as Huntress on the cover of Batgirl and the Birds of Prey #6, art by Yanick Paquette.

In the aftermath of Minos's betrayal of Spyral and death at the hands of Agent Zero, Helena became the new Director of Spyral. This however put her at odds with Grayson, who after Batman's disappearance after his battle with the Joker in "Endgame", began dismantling Spyral with the help of Agent 1, the Tiger. Grayson and Bertinelli were pawns in the twisted mind of Dr. Otto Netz, who used his two daughters to play the world's super-espionage agencies against each other in a bid to take over the body of someone he considered a worthy receptacle. Initially choosing Bertinelli, Netz then attacked Grayson's mind, but Grayson destroyed the villain mentally. In the aftermath, and as part of the DC Rebirth event, Helena left Spyral and assumed the mantle of Huntress, appearing in Batgirl and the Birds of Prey.

=== DC Rebirth ===
At the beginning of the DC Rebirth era, Helena takes the name of Huntress and crosses paths with Batgirl (Barbara Gordon) and Black Canary (Dinah Lance) in Gotham City. Issue #4 details her origin story as a mafia princess seeking revenge for her family's murders, and she is now tracking Santo Cassamento, who masterminded the murders. She works with the Birds of Prey to track down an impostor who is masquerading as Oracle, Batgirl's former hacker alias. Soon after, she discovers her mother, Maria Bertinelli has survived that fateful night and was now in charge of the operation, who tells her what had really happened: Maria had fallen in love with Santo, and wanting to get away from her husband, she and Santo organized his murder, but Santo went ahead and killed Helena's older brother as well, much to Maria's grief, and she also vowed revenge. Upon hearing this, Helena decides not to kill Santo, but arrests him and Maria, who had become a powerful crime boss. After the arrest, Helena joins the Birds of Prey, and becomes a new teacher at a local school.

== Skills, abilities, and resources ==
Like Batman, Huntress typically has no super-powers and instead relies on natural abilities; an expert martial artist, Bertinelli was trained in Sicily and later by Richard Dragon, having mastered several martial arts styles drawn from European martial styles and others, in which has included kung-fu, muay thai, boxing, and karate. Bertinelli is also well versed on weapons and marksmanship, able to use variety in which has included bullwhip, crossbows, and throwing weapons (blades, darts, boomerangs, arrows, etc.). Huntress is also noted for her high pain tolerance.

In addition to her physical abilities, Betinelli is an expert at disguise, able to convincingly portray herself as a wide-range of people and personalities. After the New 52, she is also highly-trained in espionage and has ties to a network of spies and information at her disposal while also being a capable pilot and motorcyclist. In recent times, after being infected by a parasitic organism, she first saw visions of other carriers, allowing her to track them. After Vile's defeat, she retained an ability to see visions of violent crimes. Among the weaponry Helena possess is a customized crossbow, her preferred weapon of choice. She also utilizes a customized motorcycle as her main mode of transportation.

== Other versions ==
=== Flashpoint ===
In the alternate timeline of the Flashpoint event, Huntress is a member of the Amazons' Furies.

== Collected editions ==
Solo collected editions
Title	Material collected	Published date	ISBN
Nightwing/Huntress	Nightwing/Huntress #1-4	March 2008	978-1401201272
Batman/Huntress - Cry for Blood	Batman/Huntress: Cry for Blood #1-6	March 2002	978-1840233957
Huntress: Cry for Blood	Batman/Huntress: Cry for Blood #1-6	April 2008	978-1563898013
Birds of Prey: Huntress	Batman/Huntress: Cry for Blood #1-6	Januar 2020	978-1401298906
Batman: Huntress - Cry for Blood	Batman/Huntress: Cry for Blood #1-6	August 2025	978-1799512547
Huntress: Year One	Huntress: Year One #1-6	February 2009	978-1401221263

Appearances in collected editions of other titles
Title	Material collected	Published date	ISBN
Nightwing Vol. 3: False Starts	Nightwing/Huntress #1-4, Nightwing #19-25, Nightwing #1/2	January 2016	978-1401258559
Robin Vol. 2: Triumphant	Robin III: Cry of the Huntress #1-6 and Batman #465, 467–469, Robin II: The Jokers Wild #1-4	March 2016	978-1401260897
Robin Vol. 4: Turning Points	Robin (vol. 2) #6-13, Showcase ’94 #5-6	July 2017	978-1401265878
Robin Vol. 5: War of the Dragons	Robin (vol. 2) #14-22, Detective Comics #685-686, Robin Annual #3	January 2018	978-1401275129
Batman: Cataclysm	Batman: Huntress/Spoiler - Blunt Trauma #1 and Batman #553-554, Detective Comics #719-721, Batman Shadow of the Bat #73-74, Nightwing (vol. 2) #19-20, Catwoman (vol. 2) #56-57, Robin (vol. 2) #52-53, Azrael #40, Batman Chronicles #12, Batman Blackgate #1, Batman Arkham Asylum Tales of Madness #1	June 1999	978-1563895272

== In other media ==
=== Television ===
- Helena Bertinelli / Huntress appears in Justice League Unlimited, voiced by Amy Acker. This version displays a rivalry with Black Canary and is initially a member of the Justice League before being ousted for focusing on seeking revenge against Steven Mandragora for killing her family. She later gains assistance from the Question in exchange for helping him investigate Project Cadmus and enters a relationship with him.
- Helena Bertinelli / Huntress appears in Batman: The Brave and the Bold, voiced by Tara Strong. This version is a professor at Gotham University.
- Helena Bertinelli / Huntress appears in the first two seasons of Arrow, portrayed by Jessica De Gouw. This version is the daughter of high-profile mobster Frank Bertinelli. At a young age, she was engaged to Michael Staton, who had been negotiating with the FBI to bring her father to justice. She put the information she collected for him on a laptop, but Frank found it, believed it belonged to Michael, and had him killed. Ever since, Helena works to systematically destroy her father's organization. In doing so, she encounters and temporarily dates Oliver Queen. Upon learning of his interest in Laurel Lance, Helena becomes the Huntress and starts a war between Frank's mob and a Chinese Triad before mounting an attempt on Frank's life, only for Queen to intervene and see him arrested instead. Helena leaves Starling City, vowing revenge. She returns twice to mount renewed attempts on Frank's life, who is eventually killed in the chaos of a renegade SWAT member's attack. Despite this, Helena realizes his death did not change anything. The series' executive producer Marc Guggenheim revealed on his Tumblr page that De Gouw would return as Helena, but she did not appear after the second season.

=== Film ===
- Helena Bertinelli / Huntress appears in Birds of Prey, portrayed by Mary Elizabeth Winstead. Similarly to the Batman/Huntress: Cry for Blood limited series incarnation, this version is the sole survivor of an attack on the Bertinelli crime family carried out by a rival mob led by Roman Sionis, though she initially believes the culprit was Stefano Galante. A gangster took her to safety in Italy, where she was raised by her father and brother and dedicated herself to becoming an assassin to avenge her family. As an adult, Helena returns to Gotham City to eliminate Stefano and his hitmen, encountering Dinah Lance, Renee Montoya, and Harley Quinn and learning the truth behind her family's deaths along the way. Following Sionis' death, Helena uses her family's old bank accounts to fund the creation of the Birds of Prey with herself, Lance, and Montoya as its founding members.
- Helena Bertinelli / Huntress makes a non-speaking appearance in Injustice.

=== Video games ===
- Helena Bertinelli / Huntress appears as an unlockable playable character in Justice League Heroes, voiced by Vanessa Marshall.
- Helena Bertinelli / Huntress appears as an unlockable playable character in the Nintendo DS version of Lego Batman: The Videogame.
- Helena Bertinelli / Huntress appears as a boss and playable character in DC Universe Online, voiced by Claire Hamilton. This version is the daughter of Santo Cassamento.
- Helena Bertinelli / Huntress appears as an unlockable playable character in Lego Batman 2: DC Super Heroes.
- Helena Bertinelli / Huntress appears as a character summon in Scribblenauts Unmasked: A DC Comics Adventure.
- Helena Bertinelli / Huntress, based on the Arrow incarnation, appears as a playable DLC character in Lego Batman 3: Beyond Gotham.
- Helena Bertinelli / Huntress appears in Lego DC Super-Villains, voiced by Sumalee Montano.

=== Miscellaneous ===
- Helena Bertinelli / Huntress appears in The Batman and Robin Adventures #19.
- Helena Bertinelli / Huntress appears in issue #2 of the Justice League Unlimited tie-in comic.
- The Arrow incarnation of Helena Bertinelli / Huntress appears in the non-canonical Arrow: Season 2.5 tie-in comic book. In flashbacks, following Michael's death, she traveled to Sicily, where she joined La Morte Sussurrata ("The Whispered Death"), an organization of killers trained by the Hashshashins of Persia before migrating to Italy to learn their ways and become a more effective killer. In the present, she is incarcerated before being temporarily released by Lyla Michaels and Roy Harper to help rescue Felicity Smoak from the Renegades.
- Helena Bertinelli / Huntress appears in the Injustice: Gods Among Us prequel comic as a member of Batman's Insurgency and a close friend of Batwoman and Renee Montoya before she is killed by Wonder Woman.

== Reception and analysis ==
In the view of Michael Eury and Gina Misiroglu, the character of Helena Bertinelli was introduced and given her own series to capitalize on the popularity of the previous Huntress, Helena Wayne, after that character was eliminated in DC's Crisis on Infinite Earths series. While The Huntress was cancelled after 19 issues, "the heroine has maintained a profile through numerous guest appearances in other Batman titles", as well as in a number of other media.

Sophie Bonadè characterized Helena Bertinelli is an ambiguous female character since, unlike the other members of the Bat-Family, she does not hesitate to kill. Together with her predecessor Helena Wayne she is at the forefront of a very marked increase in the number of female characters in the catalog of the publisher DC Comics in the second half of the 1980s. She is a typical character of "Bad Girl Art": She is a woman of action, has an ambiguous morality and is scantily clothed. Among the new characters appearing in the Batman universe during that time, the Huntress is the only superheroine, and the second female character in the Bat family to get her own comic series.

Marc DiPaolo called Helena Bertinelli's story a "retreat from psychological darkness into the light" and saw her "as a commentary on the Punisher" and "corrective to his pernicious influence": While she was initially also motivated by revenge, "she was ultimately rehabilitated" and "renounced murder" as a means in her crime fighting.
