= Birds of Prey (2020 film) =

Film by Cathy Yan

Birds of Prey (and the Fantabulous Emancipation of One Harley Quinn)
- Theatrical release poster
- Directed by: Cathy Yan
- Written by: Christina Hodson
- Based on: Characters from DC
- Produced by: Margot Robbie; Bryan Unkeless; Sue Kroll
- Starring: Margot Robbie; Mary Elizabeth Winstead; Jurnee Smollett-Bell; Rosie Perez; Chris Messina; Ella Jay Basco; Ali Wong; Ewan McGregor
- Cinematography: Matthew Libatique
- Edited by: Jay Cassidy; Evan Schiff
- Music by: Daniel Pemberton
- Production companies: Warner Bros. Pictures; DC Films; LuckyChap Entertainment; Clubhouse Pictures; Kroll & Co. Entertainment
- Distributed by: Warner Bros. Pictures
- Release dates: January 25, 2020 (Mexico City); February 7, 2020 (United States)
- Running time: 109 minutes
- Country: United States
- Language: English
- Budget: $82–100 million
- Box office: $205.5 million

Birds of Prey (and the Fantabulous Emancipation of One Harley Quinn) (also known as Harley Quinn: Birds of Prey, or simply Birds of Prey) is a 2020 American superhero film based on the DC Comics team the Birds of Prey. Directed by Cathy Yan and written by Christina Hodson, it is the eighth installment in the DC Extended Universe (DCEU) and serves as a spin-off of Suicide Squad (2016). The film stars Margot Robbie as Harley Quinn alongside Mary Elizabeth Winstead, Jurnee Smollett-Bell, Rosie Perez, Chris Messina, Ella Jay Basco, Ali Wong, and Ewan McGregor. It follows Harley Quinn, who, after breaking up with the Joker, is threatened by Gotham City crime lord Roman Sionis and joins forces with Helena Bertinelli, Dinah Lance, and Renee Montoya (who form the Birds of Prey) to save Cassandra Cain.

Robbie, who also served as producer, pitched the idea for Birds of Prey to Warner Bros. Pictures in 2015. The film was announced in May 2016, with Hodson being hired to write the script that November, followed by Yan signing on to direct in April 2018. The majority of the cast and crew were confirmed by December 2018. Principal photography lasted from January to April 2019 in Downtown Los Angeles, parts of the Los Angeles Arts District, and soundstages at Warner Bros. Studios in Burbank, California. Additional filming took place in September 2019.

Birds of Prey had its world premiere in Mexico City on January 25, 2020, and was released in the United States in IMAX, Dolby Cinema, ScreenX and 4DX on February 7. The film received generally positive reviews from critics, but it underperformed at the box office, grossing $205.5 million worldwide, falling short of its reported break-even point of $250–300 million. As of November 2020, Birds of Prey earned $31.2 million in total domestic video sales.

== Plot ==
4 years after the defeat of the Enchantress, (Note: As depicted in Suicide Squad (2016).) the Joker breaks up with Harley Quinn, throwing her out on the Gotham City streets. She is taken in by Doc, the owner of a Taiwanese restaurant, and recovers from her relationship by cutting her hair, adopting a spotted hyena, and taking up roller derby.

Harley gets drunk at a nightclub owned by ruthless crime lord Roman Sionis, and cripples his driver after he insults her. She meets burlesque singer Dinah Lance, who later rescues an intoxicated Harley from an attempted abduction. Impressed by Dinah's fighting skills, Roman appoints her as his new driver. The next night, Harley gets drunk again, and, overhearing some of her drinking buddies debating over whether she has actually broken up with the Joker, blows up the Ace Chemicals plant to publicly announce their breakup. When everyone finds out she is not under the Joker's protection anymore, Harley starts getting attacked by every criminal that holds a grudge against her.

Meanwhile, GCPD Detective Renee Montoya investigates a series of mob killings carried out by a crossbow-wielding vigilante. She tries to recruit Dinah as an informant, but she rejects the offer, as the GCPD wasn't there to prevent her mother's death. Roman sends Dinah and his sadistic right-hand-man Victor Zsasz to retrieve a diamond embedded with the account numbers to the fortune of the Bertinelli crime family, who were massacred years ago. Young pickpocket Cassandra "Cass" Cain steals the diamond from Zsasz and swallows it after she is arrested.

Harley, after ordering an egg sandwich from an Armenian deli, begins getting chased by Montoya and several others. Although she successfully gets away, she ends up captured by Roman's men instead. Roman sends Harley to recover the diamond for him, under the threat of death, and also places a bounty on Cass. Breaking into the GCPD with a grenade launcher filled with paint and sparkle rounds, Harley frees Cass and the pair escape. While hiding out at Harley's apartment, they bond. Doc is approached for information by the "crossbow killer", who is revealed to be Helena Bertinelli. Having survived her family's massacre and becoming trained as an assassin, Helena has been targeting each of the gangsters responsible for her family's murders, preferring the moniker "Huntress". Harley's place is later bombed by criminals looking for Cass, and Doc admits that he sold Harley out. Harley calls Roman and offers to turn her over in exchange for his protection, agreeing to meet at an abandoned amusement park. Dinah notifies Montoya of the rendezvous, but her betrayal is noticed by Zsasz, who informs Roman. A devastated Roman dons his ritualistic mask from which he gets his nickname, "Black Mask".

At the park, Montoya confronts Harley, but is kicked out of a window. Zsasz arrives and tranquilizes Harley before holding Dinah at gunpoint, but he is killed by Helena, who reveals he was the last of her family's killers. Montoya returns and reveals that Roman was the true mastermind behind the Bertinellis’ massacre. He had them killed trying to get the diamond. A stand-off ensues until they realize Roman has arrived with a small army of masked criminals. Using Harley's old gear, the makeshift team of five women withstand and repel the attack. During the battle, Cass is captured by Roman, while Dinah reveals her metahuman ability of supersonic-level screaming, defeating several of the mobsters. Harley gives chase on roller skates, and with assistance from Helena, the pair pursue Roman. At a nearby pier, Roman prepares to kill Cass, who pulls the ring from a grenade that she took from Harley's weapons chest. Harley throws him off the pier just before the grenade detonates, tearing him apart and killing him.

In the aftermath of destroying Roman's criminal empire, Montoya quits the GCPD. Using the money from the accounts hidden inside the diamond, Helena joins Dinah and Montoya in establishing a team of vigilantes called the Birds of Prey. Harley and Cass escape, selling the diamond itself to a pawn shop and starting their own business.

== Cast ==
- Margot Robbie as Dr. Harleen Quinzel / Harley Quinn: A former certified psychiatrist, who became a crazed criminal and the Joker's accomplice/girlfriend, and later a part of the Suicide Squad. She has since cut ties with the Joker after the pair broke up. Screenwriter Christina Hodson sought to reinvent Harley, wanting to expand on the character following her departure from the Joker's circle of friends. Hodson called Harley the character she enjoyed developing most due to her unpredictable personality.
- Mary Elizabeth Winstead as Helena Bertinelli / The Huntress: A vigilante who is the orphaned daughter of gangster Franco Bertinelli. Ella Mika portrays a young Helena during flashback scenes.
- Jurnee Smollett-Bell as Dinah Lance / Black Canary: A vigilante with the metahuman ability of hypersonic screams, which she inherited genetically from her mother. She is a singer in a club that Sionis owns. Smollett-Bell described Dinah as "disenfranchised and disconnected from the world" and someone who "doesn't really want to have anything to do with crime fighting or being a good-doer, which is so against her nature because we know Dinah to be all heart." The actress added she became a fan of Black Canary by playing with the character in the video game Injustice 2, which also influenced how she physically portrayed the hypersonic screams.
- Rosie Perez as Renee Montoya: An alcoholic, cynical detective in the Gotham City Police Department (GCPD), who is building a case against Sionis.
- Chris Messina as Victor Zsasz: A deranged mob killer and dedicated henchman of Sionis who carves a tally mark on his skin for each victim he claims.
- Ella Jay Basco as Cassandra Cain: A young pickpocket who has a bounty placed upon her head by Sionis after she steals a valuable diamond from him.
- Ali Wong as Ellen Yee: Montoya's ex-girlfriend and Gotham City district attorney.
- Ewan McGregor as Roman Sionis / Black Mask: A brutal, self-obsessed crime lord and head of the Sionis Crime Family who threatens Cassandra and Harley. McGregor described the character as "an absolute narcissist".

Additionally, Steven Williams portrays Captain Patrick Erickson, Montoya's superior at the GCPD; Dana Lee portrays Doc, Quinn's friend who owns a Taiwanese restaurant; François Chau portrays Mr. Keo, a rival crime boss of Sionis; Derek Wilson portrays Tim Munroe, a GCPD detective; Matt Willig portrays Happy, previously a henchman who worked for the Joker and Stefano Galante and whose face was tattooed by Quinn and the Joker; and Bojana Novakovic portrays Erika, a night club patron who is the victim of sexual violence by Sionis. Charlene Amoia and Paul Lasa respectively portray Maria and Franco Bertinelli, the mother and father of Helena; Robert Catrini portrays Stefano Galante, the mob boss who killed the Bertinelli family; Daniel Bernhardt portrays Sionis' chauffeur.

The Joker appears in the film through animated special effects during a flashback sequence, and the combined use of an archived back shot of Jared Leto from Suicide Squad and rock musician Johnny Goth doubling for Leto in a brief flashback sequence. These techniques were used because Leto was not available during filming. A still photograph of Jai Courtney as George "Digger" Harkness / Captain Boomerang also appears on a wall in the Gotham City Police Department.

== Production ==
=== Development ===
In May 2016, ahead of the release of Suicide Squad, Warner Bros. Pictures announced a spin-off film focusing on Harley Quinn and several other female DC Comics heroes and villains, such as Batgirl and the Birds of Prey. Margot Robbie was attached to reprise her role as Harley Quinn and would also serve as producer. British screenwriter Christina Hodson was announced to be writing the film in November. Robbie had pitched the film to Warner Bros. in 2015 as "an R-rated girl gang film including Harley because I was like, 'Harley needs friends.' Harley loves interacting with people, so don't ever make her do a standalone film". Robbie felt it was important for the film to have a female director. While Warner Bros. and DC Films had various other Harley Quinn-oriented films in development, Birds of Prey was the only one in whose development Robbie was directly involved.

Robbie spent three years working on Birds of Prey and continued to present it to Warner Bros. until the studio felt the project was at the point it could be made. By April 2018, Warner Bros. and DC Films had finalized a deal with Cathy Yan to direct, making her the first female Asian director to direct a superhero film. Yan pitched for the job as "wanting to smash the patriarchy." Robbie was confirmed to be producing the film under her LuckyChap Entertainment banner as part of a first-look deal with the studio; Sue Kroll and Bryan Unkless were also announced to serve as producers through their companies Kroll & Co. Entertainment and Clubhouse Pictures, respectively. Production was scheduled to begin by late 2018 or early 2019. The Penguin was intended to appear in the script at one point but was dropped to preserve his appearance in The Batman. Barbara Gordon (also known as Batgirl), is founding member of the team in the comics, but was removed from Birds of Prey due to the then planned Batgirl film, also written by Christina Hodson.

=== Pre-production ===
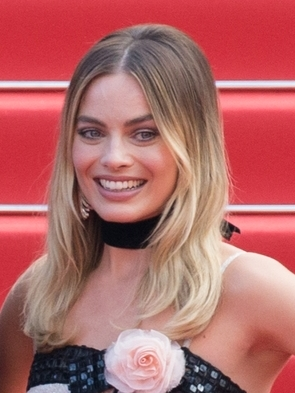
Margot Robbie in 2019

By July 2018, the film was entering pre-production. Robbie confirmed the film would be titled Birds of Prey, describing it as "different" from the other DC films featuring Harley Quinn, and said it would be produced on a relatively small budget compared to other superhero films. She also stated Harley Quinn would receive a new costume and teased the casting of diverse actors. The line-up for the Birds of Prey team was revealed to include Black Canary, Huntress, Cassandra Cain, and Renee Montoya, with the villain set to be a Batman adversary who had not yet been seen in the films. Casting began in August, with Warner Bros. considering several actresses for Huntress and Black Canary. Alexandra Daddario, Jodie Comer, Blake Lively, and Vanessa Kirby expressed interest. In August, Roman Sionis / Black Mask was revealed to be the film's antagonist. Janelle Monáe, Gugu Mbatha-Raw, and Jurnee Smollett-Bell were under consideration for Black Canary by September, while Sofia Boutella, Margaret Qualley, Mary Elizabeth Winstead and Cristin Milioti were being considered to play Huntress. Justina Machado and Roberta Colindrez tested for Renee Montoya, while Warner Bros. began seeking a 12-year-old Asian actress to play Cassandra Cain.

In late September, Smollett-Bell and Winstead were respectively cast as Black Canary and Huntress, Warner Bros. scheduled a February 7, 2020, release date, and Ewan McGregor and Sharlto Copley were under consideration for the role of Black Mask. During the U.S.-China Entertainment Summit in October, Yan confirmed the cast and that the film would be R-rated. She said, "[I] could not put the script down, it had so much dark humor to it, which a lot of my work does, and there are themes of female empowerment which are so strong and relatable." Cinematographer Matthew Libatique joined the film that month, as did Rosie Perez as Renee Montoya. Stunt coordinator Jonathan Eusebio and fight coordinator Jon Valera joined in November, and McGregor as Black Mask and Ella Jay Basco as Cassandra Cain. Robbie revealed the full title, and said the subtitle reflects the film's humorous tone. Production designer K. K. Barrett joined in December, as did Chris Messina as Victor Zsasz. Steven Williams, Derek Wilson, Dana Lee, François Chau, Matthew Willig, Robert Catrini, and Ali Wong were also cast.

=== Filming ===
Principal photography began in Los Angeles, California, in January 2019 under the working title Fox Force Five, a reference to a fictional television show of the same name mentioned in Pulp Fiction. Although filming had been expected to also take place in Atlanta and Savannah, Georgia, the entire shoot took place in Los Angeles after the production received a tax credit from California. Filming was expected to be completed by mid-April 2019. In February, Charlene Amoia joined the cast. Filming wrapped on April 15, 2019.

=== Post-production ===
Jay Cassidy and Evan Schiff served as editors, while Method Studios, Weta Digital, Luma Pictures, Image Engine, and Crafty Apes provided the visual effects for the film. In August 2019, Chad Stahelski served as a second unit director for reshoots, his company 87eleven having been already involved in developing the action scenes. Photography for the additional footage began on September 3, 2019.

Talking about the post-production process, Cathy Yan indicated that she "would have loved to have more control over the edit, but that's just kind of how it is. I don't know if there's a Cathy Yan cut out there, but I think for any filmmaker, all of us are in it because we want to express ourselves as wholly as possible. And to match what you ultimately see on screen with what's in our head".

== Music ==
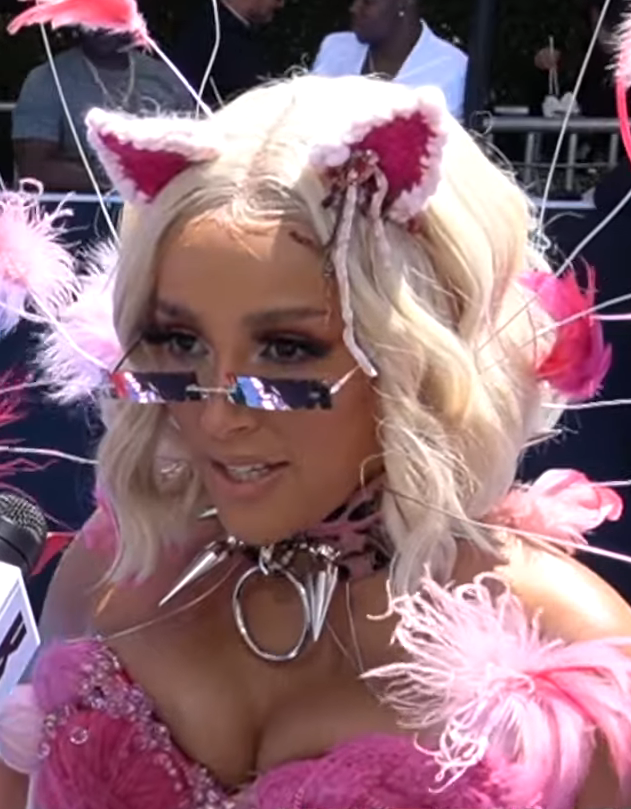
Doja Cat (pictured) was featured on the soundtrack with the song "Boss Bitch".

In September 2019, Daniel Pemberton was announced to serve as the composer for the film's score. The Original Motion Picture Score album was released by WaterTower Music on February 14, 2020.

A soundtrack album for the film, titled Birds of Prey: The Album, was announced in January 2020 and was released on February 7 by Atlantic Records to coincide with the film's release. To promote the album, a single was released every Friday before the film's release. "Diamonds" by Megan Thee Stallion and Normani was released on January 10, "Joke's On You" by Charlotte Lawrence was released on January 17, "Boss Bitch" by Doja Cat was released on January 24. In June 2020, the song was listed as the 27th best song of 2020 so far by Billboard. In December of that same year, NME named it the 12th best song of 2020. "Sway with Me" by Saweetie and GALXARA was released on January 31 and "Experiment on Me" by Halsey, was released the same day as the album. A solo version of "Sway with Me" by GALXARA was released as a standalone single on May 1, 2020.

The movie also includes songs that are not featured on the album, such as Spiderbait's "Black Betty", which plays during the fight scene at the police impound, Joan Jett and the Blackhearts' "I Hate Myself For Loving You", which plays during the montage of Harley trying to move on from the Joker, Heart's "Barracuda", which plays for the first part of the fight sequence inside the Booby Trap, and Kesha's "Woman", which plays during the final scene. The film also features a rendition of Marilyn Monroe's "Diamonds Are a Girl's Best Friend", performed by Robbie in a reimagining of Marilyn's performance of the song in the 1953 film Gentlemen Prefer Blondes.

== Marketing ==
Marketing began on January 21, 2019, when a first-look production video of the characters and costumes titled "See You Soon" was released by Warner Bros. via YouTube. DC Comics published a promotional trade paperback anthology featuring stories based on the film on November 12, 2019. The first teaser debuted exclusively in theatres on September 5, 2019, in front of screenings for It: Chapter Two; it begins with a shot of a red balloon, deceiving viewers into thinking said film had started, before Quinn walks into the scene and declares that she is "so fucking over clowns" after popping the balloon by smashing it with her mallet, in a collective reference to It / Pennywise the Dancing Clown and the Joker.

A short teaser was released on the film's social media pages, announcing the first official trailer would be released on October 1, 2019. A series of posters, which also announced the trailer debut, was released the same day. On December 5, 2019, Birds of Prey held a panel at the annual CCXP in Brazil, showing the first five minutes of the film, and the second official trailer, which was released online on January 9, 2020.

A three-day pop-up event named Harleywood was also organized at the Hollywood and Highland Center with the presence of the cast on the launch day. Artists who contributed to the soundtrack were also present to promote it, with Charlotte Lawrence and Doja Cat performing.

== Release ==
Warner Bros. Pictures theatrically released Birds of Prey in the United States on February 7, 2020, in standard, IMAX, Dolby Cinema, 4DX, and ScreenX formats. The film had its world premiere on January 25, 2020, at the Proyecto Publico Prim in Mexico City. It also screened at the BFI IMAX in London on January 29 and at the Palais des Festivals in Cannes on January 30, during a special event named Le Festival de Quinn (The Quinn Festival) in reference to the Cannes Film Festival. On February 10, 2020, it was reported that the film was being displayed under the title Harley Quinn: Birds of Prey on the websites for AMC Theatres, Cinemark Theatres, and Regal Cinemas. According to Screen Rant, the name change was mandated by Warner Bros. However, TheWrap subsequently reported that "an individual with knowledge at the studio" denied that Warner Bros. had revised the title and quoted Atom Tickets' Alisha Grauso's explanation that the new listing was "apparently for display/search purposes only for vendors and theaters, not an official title change."

=== Home media ===
On March 19, Warner Bros. Pictures announced the film would be available digitally in the United States and Canada through Premium VOD on March 24 due to movie theaters closures because of the COVID-19 pandemic restrictions. This was just over one month after the film's theatrical debut and before the end of the usual 90-day theatrical run. Another film distributed by the studio, The Way Back, was also released earlier than expected for the same reason. In the United Kingdom, it was released digitally and on video on demand on April 24, 2020. The Blu-ray, 4K Ultra HD, and DVD were released in North America on May 12, 2020. The film debuted on HBO Max on August 15, 2020. Sometime in November 2021, HBO Max accidentally replaced Birds of Prey with a modified censored version.

As of November 2020, Birds of Prey earned $31.2 million in total domestic video sales.

== Reception ==
=== Box office ===
Birds of Prey grossed $84.2 million in the United States and Canada, and $121.2 million in other territories, for a worldwide total of $205.5 million. Variety estimated the film needed to gross $300 million worldwide to break even, while sources close to the production claimed the break even point was closer to $250 million.

In the United States and Canada, Birds of Prey was initially projected to gross $50–55 million from 4,236 theaters in its opening weekend. However, after making $13 million on its first day, including $4 million from Thursday night previews, estimates were lowered, and it went on to debut at $33 million. The film finished first at the box office but marked the lowest opening for a DC film since Jonah Hex in 2010 ($5.3 million) and was 75% smaller than Suicide Squad's $133.4 million openings in 2016. The low start was blamed on the possible lack of demand for a solo film surrounding the character of Harley Quinn, as well as the confusing title and the R rating limiting the appeal and demographics for ticket sales. In its second weekend, the film fell 48% to $17.1 million, finishing second, behind Sonic the Hedgehog, and then made $7 million in its third, dropping another 59%.

The film was expected to debut to $60–70 million from 76 countries in other territories, for a worldwide total of $110–125 million. It made $7.8 million after two days of overseas release in 51 countries and $18.1 million from the full 76 after three. The film went on to make $46 million from international play in its opening weekend and $79 million worldwide. Its highest-grossing territories were Mexico ($4.6 million), Russia ($4 million), the United Kingdom ($3.9 million), Brazil ($2.8 million) and France ($2.7 million). The low opening was blamed on similar audience hesitation as in the United States and the COVID-19 pandemic in Asia closing some theaters.

Yan acknowledged the film's unsatisfactory box office performance and reflected, "There were also [undue] expectations on a female-led movie, and what I was most disappointed in was this idea that perhaps it proved that we weren't ready for this yet. That was an extra burden that, as a woman-of-color director, I already had on me anyway. So, yes, I think there were certainly different ways you could interpret the success or lack of success of the movie, and everyone has a right to do that. But, I definitely do feel that everyone was pretty quick to jump on a certain angle."

=== Critical reception ===
Birds of Prey garnered generally positive reviews from critics. On Rotten Tomatoes, the film holds an approval rating of 79% based on 450 reviews and an average rating of 6.8/10. The website's critics consensus reads, "With a fresh perspective, some new friends, and loads of fast-paced action, Birds of Prey captures the colorfully anarchic spirit of Margot Robbie's Harley Quinn." On Metacritic, it has a weighted average score of 60 out of 100, based on 59 critic reviews, indicating "mixed or average" reviews. Audiences polled by CinemaScore gave the film an average grade of "B+" on an A+ to F scale, and PostTrak reported it received an average of 3.5 out of 5 stars, with 61% of people surveyed saying they would definitely recommend it.

Richard Roeper of the Chicago Sun-Times gave the film 3.5 out of 4 stars and said that "Robbie turns in a much richer and funnier and layered performance as Harley this time around, thanks in large part to the stiletto-sharp screenplay by Christina Hodson." Joe Morgenstern, writing for The Wall Street Journal, stated, "Much of this R-rated movie is chaotic, yet it's a richly hued, madly inventive, gleefully violent and happily slapdash contraption with a formidable female at its center." Matthew Monagle of The Austin Chronicle gave it 4 out of 5 stars and said that "Yan and Robbie lean into both sides of Quinn's personality throughout the film. This allows Birds of Prey to earn every bit of its R-rating while still feeling like a Looney Tunes cartoon." A. O. Scott of The New York Times explained that "the mood of antic, playful obnoxiousness feels forced rather than liberated, the result of careful note-taking during repeated viewings of Deadpool." The Arizona Republic's Nicole Ludden praised Yan's direction, saying that it "carries a visually distinct style throughout the film that makes the layering of several chaotic scenes feel cohesive." In a 4 out of 5 review, Charlotte O'Sullivan of London Evening Standard stated that "you don't have to choose between Scorsese and superheroes. Let go of the guilt. Feel free to embrace these lesser spotted birds."

John DeFore of The Hollywood Reporter called the film: "action-packed, but more rule-following than its bonkers protagonist.... Yan finds plenty of opportunities for exciting set pieces: Extravagant action choreography makes the most of colorful set design, unlikely gimmicks and wrasslin'-style brutality. But Hodson's script offers far less diverting banter than it might've between the fight scenes." Writing for Variety, Owen Gleiberman said the film was "thin but lively" and praised the performance of Robbie, as well as Yan's direction, although noted the script as having "attitude to spare, but in a rather bare-bones way." Calling it "DC's first good action movie", Joshua Rivera of The Verge offered a mixed review while praising the film's relation to breakups, writing: "That manic energy is all that's holding Birds of Prey together at times, and the fact that all of its characters seem to thrive in it makes it all the more disappointing that the movie doesn't really take any time to get to know them better."

In a scathing review, Mick LaSalle of the San Francisco Chronicle wrote: "Birds of Prey: And the Fantabulous Emancipation of One Harley Quinn is more than horrible. It should not exist. Money should never have been raised for it. The screenplay should never have been filmed. Margot Robbie shouldn't have produced it. She certainly shouldn't have starred in it."

=== Accolades ===
Award	Date of ceremony	Category	Recipient	Result	Ref.
Hollywood Critics Association Midseason Awards	July 2, 2020	Best Picture		Nominated	
Hollywood Critics Association Midseason Awards	July 2, 2020	Best Actress	Margot Robbie	Runner-up	
Hollywood Critics Association Midseason Awards	July 2, 2020	Best Supporting Actor	Ewan McGregor	Won	
Hollywood Critics Association Midseason Awards	July 2, 2020	Best Supporting Actress	Mary Elizabeth Winstead	Nominated	
Hollywood Critics Association Midseason Awards	July 2, 2020	Best Female Director	Cathy Yan	Won	
Hollywood Critics Association Midseason Awards	July 2, 2020	Best Adapted Screenplay	Christina Hodson	Nominated	
People's Choice Awards	November 15, 2020	The Movie of 2020		Nominated	
People's Choice Awards	November 15, 2020	The Action Movie of 2020		Nominated	
People's Choice Awards	November 15, 2020	The Female Movie Star of 2020	Margot Robbie	Nominated	
People's Choice Awards	November 15, 2020	The Action Movie Star of 2020	Margot Robbie	Nominated	
People's Choice Awards	November 15, 2020	The Soundtrack Song of 2020	Doja Cat for "Boss Bitch"	Nominated	
American Music Awards	November 22, 2020	Top Soundtrack	Birds of Prey: The Album	Won	
IGN Awards	December 15, 2020	Best Movie of the Year 2020		Nominated	
IGN Awards	December 15, 2020	Best Action Movie of 2020		Won	
IGN Awards	December 15, 2020	Best Movie Ensemble of 2020	Margot Robbie, Mary Elizabeth Winstead, Jurnee Smollett-Bell, Rosie Perez, Chris Messina, Ella Jay Basco, Ali Wong, Ewan McGregor	Nominated	
IGN Awards	December 15, 2020	Best Movie Director in 2020	Cathy Yan	Nominated	
Chicago Film Critics Association	December 21, 2020	Best Art Direction	Gustaf Aspegren, Kasra Farahani, Jordan Ferrer, Julien Pougnier	Nominated	
Chicago Film Critics Association	December 21, 2020	Best Costume Design	Erin Benach, Helen Huang	Nominated	
Critics' Choice Super Awards	January 10, 2021	Best Superhero Movie		Nominated	
Critics' Choice Super Awards	January 10, 2021	Best Actor in a Superhero Movie	Ewan McGregor	Won	
Critics' Choice Super Awards	January 10, 2021	Best Actress in a Superhero Movie	Margot Robbie	Won	
Critics' Choice Super Awards	January 10, 2021	Best Actress in a Superhero Movie	Jurnee Smollett-Bell	Nominated	
San Diego Film Critics Society	January 11, 2021	Best Visual Effects	Kevin Souls & Thrain Shadbolt	Nominated	
San Diego Film Critics Society	January 11, 2021	Best Costumes	Erin Benach	Runner-up	
St. Louis Film Critics Association	January 17, 2021	Best Action Film		Nominated	
St. Louis Film Critics Association	January 17, 2021	Best Visual Effects	Kevin Souls & Thrain Shadbolt	Nominated	
St. Louis Film Critics Association	January 17, 2021	Best Soundtrack	Birds of Prey: The Album	Nominated	
Houston Film Critics Society	January 18, 2021	Best Stunt Coordination Team		Nominated	
London Film Critics' Circle	February 7, 2021	Technical Achievement	Deborah Lamia Denaver & Adruitha Lee (makeup & hair)	Nominated	
Satellite Awards	February 15, 2021	Best Actress in a Motion Picture – Musical or Comedy	Margot Robbie	Nominated	
Satellite Awards	February 15, 2021	Best Visual Effects	Kevin Souls & Thrain Shadbolt	Nominated	
Seattle Film Critics Society	February 15, 2021	Best Action Choreography		Nominated	
Seattle Film Critics Society	February 15, 2021	Best Costume Design	Erin Benach	Nominated	
Seattle Film Critics Society	February 15, 2021	Villain of the Year	Ewan McGregor	Nominated	
Hollywood Critics Association	March 5, 2021	Best Action Film		Won	
Hollywood Critics Association	March 5, 2021	Best Blockbuster Film		Won	
Hollywood Critics Association	March 5, 2021	Best Stunts		Won	
Hollywood Critics Association	March 5, 2021	Best Hair & Makeup	Deborah La Mia Denaver & Adruitha Lee	Nominated	
Hollywood Critics Association	March 5, 2021	Best Costume Design	Erin Benach	Nominated	
Hollywood Critics Association	March 5, 2021	Best Visual Effects	Kevin Souls & Thrain Shadbolt	Nominated	
Austin Film Critics Association	March 19, 2021	Best Stunts		Nominated	
Austin Film Critics Association	March 19, 2021	Robert R. 'Bobby' McCurdy Memorial Breakthrough Artist Award	Cathy Yan	Nominated	
South by Southwest	March 19, 2021	Special Jury Recognition - Title Design Competition	Michael Riley	Won	
Make-Up Artists and Hair Stylists Guild	April 3, 2021	Best Contemporary Make-up	Deborah Lamia Denaver, Sabrina Wilson, Miho Suzuki, Cale Thomas	Won	
Make-Up Artists and Hair Stylists Guild	April 3, 2021	Best Contemporary Hair Styling	Adruitha Lee, Cassie Russek, Margarita Pidgeon, Nikki Nelms	Won	
Art Directors Guild	April 10, 2021	Excellence in Production Design for a Fantasy Film	K. K. Barrett	Nominated	
Costume Designers Guild	April 13, 2021	Excellence in Contemporary Film	Erin Benach	Nominated	
MTV Movie & TV Awards	May 16, 2021	Best Villain	Ewan McGregor	Nominated	
MTV Movie & TV Awards	May 16, 2021	Best Fight	"Final Funhouse Fight"	Nominated	
BET Awards	June 27, 2021	Best Actress	Jurnee Smollett-Bell	Nominated	
Hugo Award	August 28, 2021	Best Dramatic Presentation, Long Form	Cathy Yan and Christina Hodson	Nominated	
Saturn Awards	October 26, 2021	Best Comic-to-Motion Picture Release		Nominated	
Saturn Awards	October 26, 2021	Best Actress in a Film	Margot Robbie	Nominated	
Saturn Awards	October 26, 2021	Best Supporting Actress in a Film	Jurnee Smollett-Bell	Nominated	
Saturn Awards	October 26, 2021	Best Performance by a Younger Actor in a Film	Ella Jay Basco	Nominated	
Saturn Awards	October 26, 2021	Best Film Costume	Erin Benach	Nominated	
Saturn Awards	October 26, 2021	Best Special / Visual Effects	Mark Hawker, Yael Majors & Greg Steele	Nominated	

== Related films ==
Margot Robbie's Harley Quinn returned in The Suicide Squad (2021). In April 2020, Cathy Yan said that she would be interested in directing a sequel that would explore Harley Quinn's relationship with Poison Ivy. In February 2021, Robbie discussed working on another project featuring Quinn with The Suicide Squad director James Gunn, and both she and Leslie Grace expressed interest in a crossover between Quinn and Barbara Gordon / Batgirl, whom Grace was originally set to play in the 2022 unreleased film Batgirl and is a prominent Birds of Prey member in the comics. Gunn indicated in September 2022 to be involved in a future project involving Robbie's Quinn.

By August 2021, a Black Canary solo spin-off film was in development with Smollett returning as Lance with Misha Green writing the film for HBO Max. Set photos reveal that visual references to the character was set to be made in the 2022 film Batgirl, before its cancellation.
