= Ella Jay Basco =

American actress (born 2006)

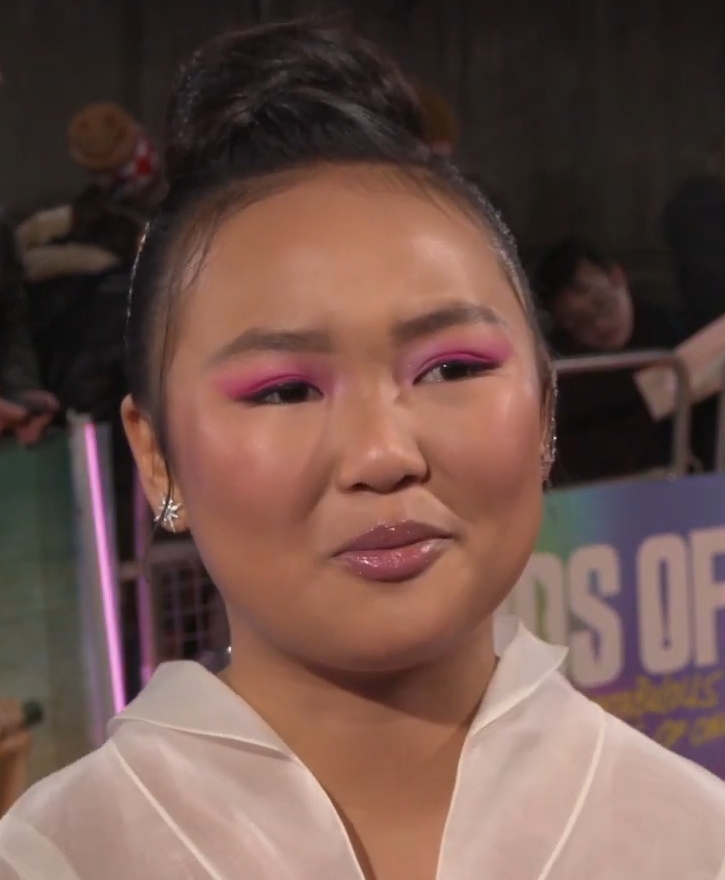
- Basco in 2020
- Born: September 17, 2006 (age 19); Los Angeles, California, U.S.
- Occupations: Actress, singer
- Years active: 2013–present
- Notable work: Birds of Prey
- Relatives: Dion Basco (uncle); Dante Basco (uncle)

Ella Jay Basco (born September 17, 2006) is an American actress best known for her work in Birds of Prey (2020). In 2020, she released an EP, Middle School. In February 2022, she released her single ”Eye to Eye” for her upcoming album.

== Early life ==
Basco was born in Los Angeles and is of Filipino and Korean ancestry. She is the second of four children. She is the niece of actors Dion and Dante Basco.

== Career ==
Basco started her career when she was six months old with a print advertisement for Old Navy. After making numerous commercials and television appearances, Ella Jay Basco landed her first film role in the 2020 film Birds of Prey as Cassandra Cain. Basco released her first EP named Middle School, it includes the song The Ballad of Cassandra Cain. In 2022, she released songs such as Eye to Eye and Bubble Tea.

== Filmography ==
=== Film ===
Year	Title	Role	Notes
2015	Glimpse of Heaven	Huian	Short film
2020	Birds of Prey	Cassandra Cain	

=== Television ===
Year	Title	Role	Notes
2013	Grey's Anatomy	Evie	Episode: "Perfect Storm"
2014	Happyland	Girl	Episode: "Pilot"
2017	Superior Donuts	Logan	Episode: "Arthur's Day Off"
2017	Veep	Ella	Episode: "A Woman First"
2017	Teachers	Amanda	Episode: "Let It Flow"
2022	A Friend of the Family	Sofia	2 episodes

== Discography ==
Title	Year	Album	Peak Chart Positions
String	2020	Middle School	N/A
The Ballad of Casandra Cain	2020	Middle School	N/A
Grou Up Kid featuring Fuzzy	2020	Middle School	N/A
Clouds	2020	Middle School	N/A
Be Happy	2020	Middle School	N/A
The Filipino Song	2020	Middle School	N/A
Gold featuring Ruby Ibarra	2021	Gold	N/A
Eye to Eye	2022	Eye to Eye	N/A
Bubble Tea	2022	Bubble Tea	N/A

== Accolades ==
Award	Date of ceremony	Film	Result	Ref.
IGN Awards	December 15, 2020	Birds of Prey	Nominated	
Saturn Awards	2021	Birds of Prey	Nominated	
