= Ed Benes =

Brazilian comic book artist

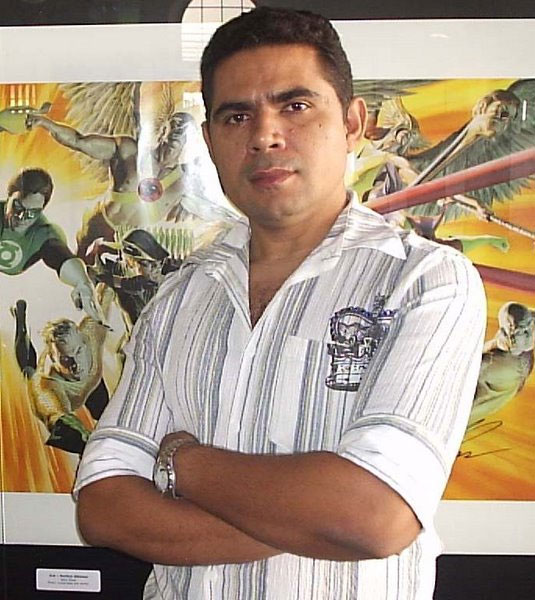
- Born: José Edilbenes Bezerra; November 20, 1972 (age 54) Alto Santo, Ceará, Brazil
- Areas: Penciller, Inker
- Notable works: Birds of Prey; Justice League of America, vol. 2 Supergirl, vol. 3 Superman, vol. 2 WildC.A.T.S.

José Edilbenes Bezerra (born November 20, 1972), better known by his professional name Ed Benes, is a Brazilian comic book artist, known for his work for DC Comics, on such titles as Birds of Prey, Supergirl, Superman, and Justice League of America.

== Early life ==
José Edilbenes Bezerra was born November 20, 1972, in Alto Santo, a small town in the Brazilian state of Ceará, in the northeast region of the country. He has lived in Limoeiro do Norte, a medium town also in Ceará state, since he was 14 years old. He began drawing on his own in 1989, referencing the artwork from his brother's comic books. He also took a correspondence art course, though he did not finish it.

== Career ==
Benes got his first professional work in 1993, after he mailed out sample art, and was discovered by Neal Adams, who gave him the job of illustrating Samuree for Continuity Comics in 1993. In the 1990s Benes began to work for Marvel where he did art for multiple comic book titles, including a Captain Marvel six-part miniseries.

He later moved to DC Comics, where he continued penciling more work for titles such as Gen^{13}, Birds of Prey, Supergirl (vol. 3), and Superman (vol. 2). In 2006 Benes was assigned to provide art to for writer Brad Meltzer's run on Justice League of America series, which he drew until 2009. He subsequently contributed to Batman and Birds of Prey (vol. 2) titles, and Steel.

In 2018, Benes released the first comic he also wrote along with penciling, Nina & Ariel. Financed through crowdfunding, the title takes an adult comics approach inspired by Fire and Ice, where two female warriors try to survive in a post-apocalyptic world.

=== Studio and teaching ===
Ed Benes began the Ed Benes Studio for aspiring comic book artists, which currently offers several courses on illustration and techniques in sequential storytelling, and hosts lectures and workshops.

== Bibliography ==
Cover to Supergirl#78. Art by Ed Benes.

=== DC ===
- Action Comics #836 (among other artists), Annual #13 (2006–10)
- Artemis: Requiem, miniseries, #1-6 (1996)
- Batgirl, vol. 4 #0, 13 (2012)
- Batman #687 (2009)
- Batman: The Dark Knight, vol. 2, #8 (2012)
- Birds of Prey #56-65, 67, 70, 72, 75, 79-80 (2003–05)
- Birds of Prey, vol. 2, #1-4 (2010)
- Blackest Night: Titans, miniseries, #1-3 (2009)
- Codename: Knockout #15-18 (2002)
- Countdown to Infinite Crisis #1 (among other artists) (2005)
- DC Universe #0 (among other artists) (2008)
- Deathstroke, the Terminator Annual #3 (1994)
- Detective Comics, vol. 2, #10 (2012)
- Flash, vol. 2, Annual #7 (1994)
- Gen 13 #45-50, 52, 54–59, 61–63, 67, 71-74 (1999-2002)
- Green Lantern, vol. 4, #49 (2010)
- Green Lanterns #8 (2016)
- Hal Jordan and the Green Lantern Corps #10 (2016)
- Gunfire #0, 6–7, 10-13 (1994–95)
- Justice League of America, vol. 2, #0-7, 9-10, 12, 14–15, 17–19, 22–23, 25-27 (2006–09)
- Justice League Task Force #24 (1995)
- Red Lanterns #1-7 (2011–12)
- Steel #1 (one-shot) (2011)
- Supergirl, vol. 3, #75-80 (2002–03)
- Supergirl, vol. 4, #6 (2006)
- Superman #649 (among other artists) (2006)
- Superman, vol. 2, #217-219, 221–223, 225-226 (2005–06)
- Superman, vol. 3, #27 #29-31 (2014)
- Superman, vol. 4, #15 (among other artists, 2016)
- Superman/Batman #50, 78 (2008–10)
- Superman/Wonder Woman #28 (2016)
- Teen Titans, vol. 3, Annual #1 (among other artists) (2006), #68 (2009)
- Thundercats: The Return, miniseries, #1-5 (2003)
- Untold Tales of Blackest Night #1 (among other artists) (2010)
- Wonder Woman, vol. 2, (Artemis) Annual #6 (1997)

=== Marvel ===
- Captain America, vol. 2, #12 (along with Joe Bennett) (1997)
- Captain Marvel, miniseries, #1-4, 6 (1995–96)
- Gladiator/Supreme (along with Carlos Mota) (1997)
- Iron Man, vol. 2, #12 (among other artists) (1997)
- Silver Surfer, vol. 3, #124 (1997)
- Uncanny X-Men #351 (1998)
- What If?, vol. 2, (Hulk) #80 (along with Kerry Gammill) (1995)

=== Other publishers ===
- Glory #11-12 (Image)
- WildC.A.T.S. #44-50 (1998) (Image)
- Samuree, vol. 2, #4 (Continuity)

== Notes ==
Preceded by Leonard Kirk	Supergirl artist 2002–2003	Succeeded by Ian Churchill
Preceded by Casey Jones	Birds of Prey artist 2003–2005	Succeeded by Joe Bennett
Preceded by Jim Lee	Superman artist 2005–2006	Succeeded by Carlos Pacheco
Preceded by none	Justice League of America artist 2006–2009	Succeeded by Mark Bagley
Preceded by Claude St. Aubin	Birds of Prey artist 2010	Succeeded by Ardian Syaf
