= List of Batman supporting characters =

Batman alongside allies. Pictured from left to right: Robin, Batman, Oracle, Commissioner Gordon, and Huntress. Art by Jim Lee.

The Batman supporting characters are fictional characters that appear in the American comic books published by DC Comics featuring the superhero Batman as the main protagonist.

"Batman family" or "Bat-Family" is the informal term for Batman's closest allies, who are mainly masked vigilantes operating in Gotham City. Since the Bat-Family's introduction in 1939, Batman has accumulated a number of recognized supporting characters. The first Batman supporting character was Commissioner James "Jim" Gordon, Batman's ally in the Gotham City Police Department, who first appeared with Batman in Detective Comics #27 (May 1939). Some of the other allies of Batman include his vigilante partner, Robin (Dick Grayson), who was introduced in 1940; his butler, Alfred Pennyworth, who was introduced in 1943; and Barbara Gordon, who was introduced in 1967.

Batman also forms bonds and close working relationships with other superheroes, including Justice League members such as Superman, Green Arrow, Zatanna and Wonder Woman, as well as members of the Outsiders superhero team. Others such as Jason Bard, Harold Allnut, Onyx, and Toyman work for him.

In addition, Batman has a collection of adversaries in fiction that is commonly referred to as Batman's rogues gallery. The rogues gallery includes the Joker, the Penguin, the Riddler, and Poison Ivy. He also has several love interests, including Catwoman, Talia al Ghul, Silver St. Cloud, and Julie Madison.

== Bat-Family ==
The Bat-Family (sometimes referred to as the Gotham Knights) is the informal name for Batman's closest allies collectively. It mainly consists of masked vigilantes who either have been trained by Batman or who operate in Gotham City with his tacit approval. Many of its members are also his adopted children, with the exception of Damian Wayne, the first of the Robins to be biologically related to Batman.

The group consists of similarly minded superheroes who operate in the Gotham City area and work towards achieving common goals. Batman is often the team leader or, in some cases, its dispatch. Various members of the group usually interact with one another and assist in each other's cases, even within their respective series. Although some members occasionally resent Batman's intrusion into their lives, all respect him as a part of the superhero community and rarely challenge his authority. Most of the members also have a strong rapport with Batman. In a 2002 storyline in which Bruce Wayne is accused of murder, Batman's friends gather to prove his innocence. Throughout Batman's history, it has also been implied that this network serves as a surrogate family for Batman and keeps him from slipping too far into his vigilante persona.

=== Current members ===
Name	Creator(s)	First appearance	Fictional biography
Bruce Wayne / Batman	Bill Finger; Bob Kane	Detective Comics #27 (May 1939)	As a child, Bruce Wayne witnessed the murder of his parents, which was a traumatic experience for him. After some time, however, he used a combination of his trauma and personal wealth to travel the world and acquire skills for combating crime. Wayne eventually revealed to the public that he had been secretly funding Batman's activities for years and would use a new corporation, Batman Incorporated, to take Batman and his mission worldwide. In the DC Universe, Batman is viewed as an outlaw, but holds a high reputation with some people due to his status as a member of the Justice League; Batman is also considered to be a leader, and sometimes "the world's greatest detective", since he possesses skills in observation, critical thinking and problem-solving.
Richard John "Dick" Grayson / Robin / Nightwing	As Dick Grayson / Robin: Bill Finger; Bob Kane; Jerry Robinson As Nightwing: Marv Wolfman; George Pérez	Dick Grayson / Robin: Detective Comics #38 (April 1940) As Nightwing: Tales of the Teen Titans #44 (July 1984)	Richard Grayson was originally an orphaned child acrobat who served as Batman's first sidekick; he also was Batman's ward who eventually became his adopted son. A founding member of the Teen Titans, as an adult, he took up the identity of Nightwing and served as protector of Blüdhaven, Gotham's sister city to the south. During the extended absence of Bruce, Dick temporarily served as Batman. During the period when Dick faked his death, he worked for the agency Spyral as Agent 37.
Jason Peter Todd / Robin / Red Hood	As Jason Todd / Robin: Gerry Conway; Don Newton As Red Hood; Judd Winick	As Jason Todd: Batman #357 (March 1983) As Robin: Batman #366 (December 1983) As Red Hood: Batman: Under the Hood (February 2005)	Jason Todd was a young street orphan who Batman caught trying to steal the Batmobile's tires. Batman recognized some skills in Jason and adopted him as his second son and the second Robin. He was later murdered by the Joker, but resurrected by Talia al Ghul using a Lazarus Pit. When Jason learns that Batman never avenged his death by killing Joker, he becomes Red Hood, his murderer's former alias, and becomes at odds with the Batman Family. In the New 52, he mends his relationship with Batman and forms the Outlaws team with Starfire and Arsenal. Later, he is recruited to lead Task Force Z.
Timothy Jackson "Tim" Drake-Wayne/ Robin / Red Robin	Marv Wolfman; Pat Broderick	As Tim Drake: Batman #436 (August 1989) As Robin: Batman #457 (December 1990) As Red Robin: Red Robin #1 (August 2009)	Timothy Drake was a teenage crime fighter whose skill drove him to assist Batman after Jason Todd's death. After his family was threatened and moved into witness protection, he was adopted as Bruce Wayne's son, becoming the third Robin, and becoming Red Robin afterwards. In the New 52, Tim was offered the role of Robin by Batman, but chose to be Red Robin out of respect for Jason Todd. He later leaves Gotham to lead a new team called the Teen Titans. He has since been part of a new team formed by Batman and Batwoman (Kate Kane). In a 2021 story line in the Infinite Frontier era, Tim realizes he is bisexual, becoming the third LGBTQ member of Batman's inner circle.
Stephanie Brown / Spoiler / Robin / Batgirl	Chuck Dixon; Tom Lyle	As Stephanie Brown; Detective Comics #647 (June 1992) As Spoiler: Detective Comics #648 (July 1992) As Robin: Robin (vol. 2) #126 (May 2004) As Batgirl: Batgirl (vol. 2) #1 (August 2009)	Originally introduced as Spoiler, the heroic daughter of the villain Cluemaster, Stephanie Brown became the next Robin after her love interest, Tim Drake, retired from the role. Unlike her predecessors, she was never adopted by Batman. During one patrol, Batman ordered Stephanie not to interfere, but she did so in order to save his life. This caused her to be fired for disobeying Batman's orders. She was later captured, tortured, and murdered by Black Mask. Later it was revealed that Dr. Leslie Thompkins faked her death; she hid Stephanie's survival from Batman and Tim Drake until later on. After a period of assisting Batman again as Spoiler again, she takes over the role of Batgirl when Cassandra Cain gives it up. In 2020s comics, she, Cassandra, and Barbara work together as a team of Batgirls.
Barbara Joan Gordon / Batgirl / Oracle	As Barbara Gordon / Batgirl: William Dozier; Julius Schwartz; Gardner Fox; Carmine Infantino As Oracle: Kim Yale; John Ostrander	As Barbara Gordon / Batgirl: Detective Comics #359 (January 1967) As Oracle: Suicide Squad #23 (January 1989) Return to Batgirl: Batgirl (vol. 4) #1 (September 2011)	Barbara Gordon was the daughter of Gotham police commissioner Jim Gordon and love interest of Dick Grayson. Barbara began operating as Batgirl soon after the first appearance of Robin. After she was left paraplegic by the Joker, she became Oracle, an information broker, and founded the Birds of Prey. Following Flashpoint, Barbara's history as Oracle is cut short; having reportedly undergone an unknown method of recovery, Barbara began to serve as Batgirl once again, albeit with PTSD and anger issues stemming from her nearly fatal attack. In the 2020s she returns to the Oracle role to support her successors Cassandra and Stephanie after her spinal implant begins to burn out, but occasionally goes on field missions as Batgirl.
Damian Wayne / Robin	As an Infant: Mike W. Barr; Jerry Bingham As a Teen: Grant Morrison; Andy Kubert	As an Infant: Batman: Son of the Demon (1987) As a Teen: Batman #655 (September 2006) As Robin: Batman #657 (November 2006)	Damian Wayne is the biological son of Bruce Wayne and Talia al Ghul as well as the grandson of Ra's al Ghul. Damian is raised largely by subordinates in his grandfather's terrorist organization, the League of Assassins, and trained by his mother until he began living in Gotham with the Wayne family. After Dick Grayson takes up the mantle of Batman, he chooses Damian to be the new Robin. Damian continues to operate as Robin, actively serving with his father upon his reemergence and Grayson's reemergence as Nightwing.
Ace the Bat-Hound	Bill Finger; Sheldon Moldoff	Batman #92 (June 1955)	In 1955, a few months after the Superman mythos saw the introduction of Krypto, the Batman mythos introduced Ace the Bat-Hound, a German Shepherd who helped Batman and Robin in multiple cases. Ace is largely erased from continuity following Crisis on Infinite Earths before being reintroduced.
Katherine Rebecca "Kate" Kane / Batwoman	Geoff Johns; Grant Morrison; Greg Rucka; Mark Waid; Keith Giffen	As Kate Kane; 52 #7 (August 2006) As Batwoman; 52 #11 (September 2006)	As a wealthy heiress, former West Point cadet, and cousin of Bruce Wayne who became a superhero, Kate Kane appeared after the timeline-altering Infinite Crisis in the pages of 52 for several months. For a portion of 52, she fought alongside Nightwing. After Bruce Wayne's apparent death in 2009, Batwoman was the feature character in Detective Comics for a short time, which prompted the launch of a Batwoman solo series with the onset of The New 52.
Selina Kyle / Catwoman	Bill Finger; Bob Kane	Batman #1 (Spring 1940)	Selina Kyle was one of Batman's early adversaries. In later years, she becomes his frequent love interest and a defender of Gotham City's East End. One year after the events of Infinite Crisis, she retired (allowing Holly Robinson to take the mantle of Catwoman) and gave birth to a baby girl named Helena. Batman calls her out of retirement to infiltrate an Amazon sect. Following a series of kidnappings of her baby, Catwoman gives her daughter up for adoption. In the 2010s, she served on Amanda Waller's Justice League of America as the team's foil for Batman. In the 2020s her storylines include her failed wedding to Bruce Wayne and the Batman Eternal series where she assumed the empire of her father, mob boss Rex Calabrese.
Cassandra Cain-Wayne / Batgirl / Orphan / Black Bat	Kelley Puckett; Damion Scott	As Cassandra Cain: Batman #567 (July 1999) As Batgirl: Batman: Legends of the Dark Knight #120 (August 1999) As Kasumi: Justice League Elite #1 (September 2004) As Black Bat: Batman Incorporated #6 (May 2011) As Orphan: Batman and Robin Eternal #26 (March 2016)	Cassandra Cain-Wayne is a martial artist and daughter of the assassins David Cain and Lady Shiva. Batman and Oracle trained her as the next Batgirl. After abandoning this role, she briefly became the leader of the League of Assassins. It is revealed later that the mercenary Deathstroke is responsible for some of Cassandra's activities through brainwashing. Cassandra has since been legally adopted by Bruce Wayne as his daughter. After the events of Batman: RIP, Cassandra ceased being Batgirl due to apparent frustration and passed the identity to her close friend Stephanie Brown; she was later revealed to have done so willingly. She now operates as Black Bat, Batman Inc.'s representative in Hong Kong. She returned to Gotham during the events of Batman: Gates of Gotham to help stop the Architect from destroying the city. She returned to the mainstream continuity afterward in the 2015 comic Batman and Robin Eternal, in which she took her father's alias, Orphan. Moreover, a young woman wearing a similar costume to that of Black Bat appeared as a member of Batman Incorporated.
Duke Thomas / The Signal	Scott Snyder; Greg Capullo	As Unnamed Child: Batman (vol. 2) #21 (New 52) (March 2014) As Duke Thomas: Batman #30 (New 52) (October 2014) As Robin: We Are... Robin #1 (May 2015) As The Signal: Batman and The Signal #1 (March 2018)	A young man living in Gotham, Duke Thomas became the leader of the We Are Robin vigilante gang after an attack by the Joker caused his parents to go permanently insane. The We Are Robin group consisted of hundreds of teenagers who donned the Robin R symbol and took to defending the city during Batman's absence in the aftermath of Batman: Endgame. Duke soon broke away and struck out on his own before being recruited by Batman officially, becoming the Signal, the daylight protector of Gotham. Duke is also a metahuman with the ability to manipulate light and darkness and is a member of the Outsiders.
Lucas "Luke" Fox / Batwing	Jimmy Palmiotti; Justin Gray; Eduardo Pansica	Batwing #19 (June 2013)	The latest Batwing and son of Batman associate Lucius Fox. He joined Batman's team in Detective Comics but has stepped away from the Batwing role to pursue other heroic ventures.
Harper Row / Bluebird	As Harper Row: Scott Snyder; Greg Capullo As Bluebird: Dustin Nguyen	As an unnamed woman: Batman (vol. 2) #1 (September 2011) As Harper Row: Batman (vol. 2) #7 (March 2012) As Bluebird: Batman (vol. 2) #28 (February 2014)	Harper Row officially joined Batman's group of allies during the events of Batman Eternal, a year-long weekly maxiseries. Instead of taking on the mantle of Robin, which is traditionally that of Batman's sidekick, Harper Row instead adopts an entirely new superhero identity, Bluebird. Her appearance marks the arrival of the first new "Bat-family" character in Batman comics since DC relaunched its entire line in 2011 as part of its The New 52 publishing event.
Terrance "Terry" McGinnis / Batman	Paul Dini; Bruce Timm	Batman Beyond #1 (March 1999)	The Batman of the future and biological son of Bruce Wayne. Debuted in the animated series Batman Beyond, and in 2011 entered the official DCU.
Jean-Paul Valley / Azrael	Dennis O'Neil; Joe Quesada; Peter Milligan; Grant Morrison	Batman: Sword of Azrael #1 (October 1992)	A genetically modified assassin of the Order of St. Dumas who once replaced Bruce Wayne as Batman when he was badly injured by Bane. Valley defeated Bane but grew increasingly paranoid and violent, forcing Bruce to reclaim the Batman mantle. Valley returned to the Azrael identity and attempted to regain Batman's trust. After many years, he managed to find his way back into Batman's graces and served as an "Agent of the Bat" until his death. Because his body was never found, speculation arose as to whether he had died, but that speculation was laid to rest when Valley was reanimated as a member of the Black Lantern Corps during Blackest Night. He was reintroduced in the pages of Batman & Robin Eternal and joined Batman's team in Detective Comics.
Helena Bertinelli / Huntress	Joey Cavalieri; Joe Staton	As Huntress: The Huntress #1 (April 1989) As Batgirl: Batman: Shadow of the Bat #83 (March 1999)	The daughter of a slain Mafia family. She rejected crime and took to patrolling Gotham as an antiheroine. She serves as an agent of Oracle, one of the Birds of Prey. While her relationship with Batman has been tenuous, she later earned his respect. Following the Flashpoint event that altered DC Comics continuity, it has been revealed that Helena Bertinelli has been dead for a while, while The New 52 Huntress has been revealed as Helena Wayne. It is later revealed that Bertinelli has faked her death and works as a spy, named Matron, for the secret organization known as Spyral, alongside Dick Grayson. After the Grayson series, much like Dick Grayson, Bertinelli also leaves Spyral and takes up the mantle of the Huntress and starting from DC Rebirth, much like her pre-Flashpoint version, she joins the Birds of Prey.
Harleen Frances Quinzel / Harley Quinn	Paul Dini; Bruce Timm	First appearance: Batman: The Animated Series "Joker's Favor" (September 11, 1992) First comic appearance: The Batman Adventures #12 (September 1993, non-canon); Batman: Harley Quinn #1 (October 1999, canon)	Harleen Qunizel was a former psychiatrist working at an internship at Arkham Asylum who fell in love with the Joker. After breaking Joker out of the Asylum she became Harley Quinn (a play on Harlequin), his loyal sidekick and girlfriend, but suffered abusive treatment from him. In the New 52, Harley left the Joker and gradually transitioned into an antihero, being a main member of the Suicide Squad. Her origin was also revised to reflect the Joker's origins, having been pushed into a vat of chemicals by him against her will and undergoing a similar transformation to him. In DC Rebirth, Harley reinvented herself as a brutal vigilante and officially joined Batman's family in the wake of Joker War.
Minhkhoa Khan / Ghost-Maker	James Tynion IV; Jorge Jimenez	Batman (vol. 3) #100 (December 2020)	The man who would become Ghost-Maker was an old friend of Bruce Wayne who trained with many of Bruce's mentors. He's a psychopath, unable to feel any empathy or fear, and sees vigilantism as an art rather than a duty. Their friendship turned into a rivalry due to opposing views on crimefighting as well as Ghost-Maker killing one of their mentors and have come to blows when they crossed paths. Ghost-Maker agreed to stay out of Gotham and began his crimefighting career in Southeast Asia until moving on to other cities. After the events of the Joker War, Ghost-Maker broke the pact to take Batman's place as Gotham's new protector and attempted to capture a reformed Harley Quinn and kill the teen vigilante Clownhunter. After fighting Batman and coming to an understanding he initially intended to leave but was convinced to stay and help fight crime in a changed Gotham City, on the condition that he doesn't kill.
Jarro	Scott Snyder; Francis Manapul	Justice League (vol. 4) #10 (December 2018)	Jarro is a Star Conqueror created by Batman from a surviving tissue sample from Starro and raised by Batman to assist the Justice League.
Bat-Cow	Grant Morrison; Chris Burnham	Batman Incorporated (vol. 2) #1 (May 2008)	A bovine member of the Batman Family. Rescued from the slaughterhouse during one of Batman's raids on Leviathan, it was taken as a pet by Robin, Damian Wayne with the experience of making Robin a vegetarian.

==== Batman Inc. (current members) ====
Name	Creator(s)	First appearance	Fictional biography
Jiro Osamu / Nihon no Battoman (Batman of Japan in English)	Grant Morrison; Yanick Paquette	Batman Incorporated #1 (January 2011)	Formerly operated as the second Mr Unknown, now serves as the Batman of Tokyo as a member of Batman Inc.
Wang Baixi / Bat-Man of China	Gene Luen Yang; Viktor Bogdanovic	New Super-Man #1 (September 2016)	Wang Baixi was chosen by the Chinese Ministry of Self-Reliance to become their equivalent of America's Batman.
Bilal Asselah / Nuitcoureur (Nightrunner in English)	David Hine; Kyle Higgins; Agustin Padilla	Detective Comics (vol. 2) Annual #12 (February 2011)	Batman Inc.'s representative in Paris, a Sunni Muslim and expert free runner.
Santiago Vargas / El Gaucho	Edmond Hamilton; Sheldon Moldoff	Detective Comics #215 (January 1955)	A renowned crime fighter from Argentina who was inspired by Batman, he is a former member of Club of Heroes and now operates as a member of Batman Inc.
Bao Pham / Clownhunter	James Tynion IV; Jorge Jiménez	Batman (vol. 3) #96 (October 2020)	Vietnamise-American Bao Pham's parents were murdered by the Joker at their pho restaurant in the Narrows. Bao believed that Batman would permanently end Joker's reign of terror forever, but his faith in superheroes was shaken when the Joker continued his crime spree. Five years later during the Joker War, Bao decided to take matters into his own hands as the "Clownhunter", and began hunting and killing Joker's goons. In the aftermath of 'Fear State', Clownhunter is recruited by Ghost-Maker and Batman into Batman Inc.
Anzor / Gray Wolf	Ed Brisson; John Timms	Batman 2022 Annual Vol. 3 #1 (May 2022)	The Chechen vigilante was working with Lex Luthor as the protector of Kazbeck. After some illicit experiments went awry in a local prison, Lex left Gray Wolf to handle the situation alone while he pulled out. Investigating an empty town, Ghost-Maker and Batman Incorporated investigated the prison, discovering the town was given Lazarus Resin and went violent in the process. Gray Wolf initially locked the villagers up to protect them, but he and Ghost-Maker were able to cure them from the Resin. He was given a place on Batman Inc. as a result.
Beryl Hutchinson / Knight	Grant Morrison; Howard Porter	JLA #26 (February 1999)	Formerly known as Squire, sidekick of Knight, Beryl takes on the mantle of the Knight after Cyril's death.
Johnny Riley / The Dark Ranger	Grant Morrison; Tony Daniel	Batman #681 (December 2008)	Following the death of the first Ranger at the hands of Wingman, his former sidekick, the Scout, has taken up the mantle of the new Dark Ranger. Now operates as a member of Batman Inc. He appears to be of Aboriginal descent.
William "Bill" Great Eagle / Man-Of-Bats	Ed Herron; Sheldon Moldoff	Batwoman (vol. 2) #2 (December 2011)	Bill Great Eagle is a Native American doctor and social activist from South Dakota. He is the Native American representative of Batman Inc.
Charles Great Eagle / Raven Red	Ed Herron; Sheldon Moldoff	Batman Incorporated (vol. 2) #3 (September 2012)	The son of Man-of-Bats, and a member of Batman Inc.
Wingman	Joshua Williamson; Howard Porter	Batman (vol. 3) #123 (July 2022)	Nothing much is known about the new Wingman, other than he's the fourth person to assume the mantle and that he joined Batman Inc.

==== Batman Inc. (former/deceased members) ====
Name	Creator(s)	First appearance	Fictional biography
George Cross / The Hood	Alan Grant; Bret Blevins	Batman: Shadow of the Bat #21 (November 1993)	Maverick Special Government Agent of England, now operates as a member of Batman Inc.
Ravil / Batman of Moscow	Peter Tomasi, Patrick Gleason	Batman and Robin (vol. 2) #1	Ravil was Batman's representative of Russia, but was murdered by Nobody with a vat of acid.
Cyril Sheldrake / Knight	Grant Morrison; Howard Porter	JLA #26 (February 1999)	The original Knight was Percival Sheldrake who became the sidekick of Shining Knight as Squire during the World War 2 period. He became the Knight as an adult and made his son, Cyril the new Squire and teamed up with Batman. When Percy died, Cyril became the new Knight and adopted Beryl Hutchinson as his new Squire. After he joined Batman Inc., he was killed by a henchman of Leviathan.
Calvin Rose / Talon	James Tynion IV; Scott Snyder; Guillem March	Talon #0 (November 2012)	A former Talon of the Court of Owls who disobeys his masters and goes on the run from the Court. He is a world-class escape artist and a trained assassin. He was killed by Bane but revived by the Court with enhanced durability and strength. Rose starred in his own series after the launch of the New 52. The last issue of the series sees Rose inducted into Batman Incorporated.
David Zavimbe / Batwing	Grant Morrison; Chris Burnham	Batman Incorporated #5 (May 2011)	Zavimbe served as the Incorporated representative of Tinasha in the Democratic Republic of Congo.
The Outsiders	Mike W. Barr; Jim Aparo	The Brave and the Bold #200 (July 1983)	Becoming fed up with the politics and practices of the Justice League, Batman formed the Outsiders to have his own unit to perform on his terms. Drifting through various incarnations, Batman restarted the team and operated as its leader until his disappearance in Final Crisis. In the wake of his death, he charged Alfred with assembling and maintaining a new team of Outsiders in an attempt to replace all the individual skills of Batman through the various members. In Batman Incorporated, Batman forms a new Outsiders team, which acts as a black-ops wing of Batman Inc. Freight Train, Looker, Metamorpho, Katana, and Halo rejoin the team and Red Robin becomes the new leader. The new team did not last long since all the members except for Red Robin were caught in an explosion that Lord Death Man set off in Batman Incorporated: Leviathan Strikes. The team turned up alive in the first issue of the New 52 Batman Incorporated series.

==== Five years in the future (Futures End) ====
Name	Creator(s)	First appearance	Fictional biography
Cassandra Cain-Wayne / Batgirl / Orphan / Black Bat	Kelley Puckett; Damion Scott	As Cassandra Cain: Batman #567 (July 1999) As Batgirl: Batman: Legends of the Dark Knight #120 (August 1999) As Kasumi: Justice League Elite #1 (September 2004) As Black Bat: Batman Incorporated #6 (May 2011) (as Orphan); Batman and Robin Eternal #26 (March 2016)	Cassandra made her debut in the New 52, five years in the future, where she is a member of the League of Batgirls, led by Barbara Gordon a.k.a. Bete Noir.
Stephanie Brown / The Spoiler / Robin / Batgirl	Chuck Dixon; Tom Lyle	As Stephanie Brown: Detective Comics #647 (June 1992) As Spoiler: Detective Comics #648 (July 1992) As Robin IV; Robin #126 (May 2004) (as Batgirl); Batgirl #1 (August 2009)	Five years in the future, she is a member of the League of Batgirls, led by Barbara Gordon a.k.a. Bete Noir.
Tiffany Fox / Batgirl	As Tiffany Fox: Len Wein; John Calnan (as Batgirl); Justin Gray; Jimmy Palmiotti; Eduardo Pansica	As Tiffany Fox: Batman #308 (February 1979) As Batgirl; Batwing #22 (September 2013)	The youngest daughter of Lucius Fox. Five years in the future Tiffany joined the League of Batgirls, led by Barbara Gordon a.k.a. Bete Noir.
Duke Thomas / Signal / Lark / Robin	Scott Snyder; Greg Capullo	Batman (vol. 2) #21 (August 2013)	Five years in the future, Duke has become the new protege next to Batman.

=== Deceased members ===
==== Prime Earth ====
Name	Creator(s)	First appearance	Fictional biography
Alfred Pennyworth	Don Cameron; Bob Kane; Bill Finger; Jerry Robinson	Batman #16 (April 1943)	The Wayne family butler and father figure to the rest of the Wayne family. Alfred raised Bruce Wayne after his parents were killed and considers Bruce a son in much the same way that he considers Bruce's adopted children his grandchildren. During the "City of Bane" storyline, Alfred is killed by Bane.
Henry Clover, Jr / Gotham	Tom King; David Finch	DCU: Rebirth Vol 1 #1 (July 2016)	Henry Clover bought the ability to use superpowers by trading in years of his life. With these powers, he could live two years at Superman's level, or hours as a god. If he wouldn't use his powers, it wouldn't affect his lifespan. He made his first public appearance helping Batman save a commercial plane from a Kobra Cult terrorist attack. Being young and inexperienced, Batman decided to take him and his sister Claire under his wing to make them better heroes. While saving civilians from various explosions, the two entered a crossfire between agents working for Amanda Waller, Hugo Strange and Psycho-Pirate, who had mind-controlled Waller's men. Psycho-Pirate then used his powers on Gotham, filling him with rage. Gotham lashed out and slaughtered twenty-seven of Waller's men. After the carnage, Gotham made the mistake of taking off his mask, which pushed the last survivor to track down and murder his parents. When Gotham realized what happened, he defied Batman and killed the soldier. Psycho-Pirate's manipulation led Gotham to believe that the city was incurable, and he began a rampage. Batman began to throw everything he could at Gotham, but as the older vigilante was quickly overpowered, the Justice League was called in to help. While Gotham was at first taken by surprise, he quickly regained his focus and fully utilized his power to achieve near-god-like strength. He defeated the entire Justice League, before being attacked and killed by his own sister.

==== New Earth (Old canon) ====
Name	Creator(s)	First appearance	Fictional biography
Gavin King / Orpheus	Alex Simmons; Dwayne Turner	Batman: Orpheus Rising #1 (October 2001)	Orpheus was an agent of a shadowy organization that had outfitted him with crimefighting equipment and training. He became one of Batman's agents and posed as a crime boss, but was later killed by Black Mask.

=== Status unclear ===
==== Prime Earth ====
Name	Creator(s)	First appearance	Fictional biography
The Birds of Prey	Jordan B. Gorfinkel; Chuck Dixon	Black Canary/Oracle: Birds of Prey #1 (June 1996)	A covert group of heroes formed by Oracle that largely fight crime in Gotham. Prominent members have included Black Canary, Lady Blackhawk, and Helena Bertinelli as the Huntress. Following "Flashpoint", the team has been rebooted with Black Canary as the leader, Starling, Poison Ivy, Katana, and Batgirl assisting the team on occasion. The group disbanded following a severe falling out between Canary and Batgirl in Birds of Prey (vol. 3) #34, but would later reform sometime after the two reconciled.
Michael Lane / Azrael	Grant Morrison	Dark Knight #1 (May 2009)	The Third Ghost of Batman, one of a series of Batman impostors created by Simon Hurt, became the new Azrael wearing a mystical suit of armor given to the original Batman by Talia al Ghul. In the New 52, Michael's absence from Batman's organization is explained by his choosing seclusion and daily prayer as a way of repenting for all that he did as a tool of Ra's Al Ghul and Doctor Hurt, believing himself to hold an important role in the apocalypse.
Kirk Langstrom / Man-Bat	Frank Robbins; Neal Adams; Julius Schwartz	Detective Comics #400 (June 1970)	Langstrom can alternate from being able to control his monstrous persona to giving in to his instincts. When he does control it, he uses the Man-Bat identity for good. He was seen as part of the Network fighting crime. In the New 52, Kirk Langstrom first appears when he and his wife Francine are escorted by Batwoman to Batman's location. Taking responsibility as the creator of the serum, he uses a sample of the serum Batman had obtained to inject himself. This creates an anti-virus that also spreads through the air. Unfortunately, Langstrom is turned into a Man-Bat (the last remaining Man-Bat) as his anti-virus cures the remaining citizens of Gotham. After reverting from the Man-Bat form, Langstrom becomes addicted to the Man-Bat serum, taking it every night. However, he apparently does not remember his actions from the night, worrying that a string of reported killings is his fault.
Helena Wayne / Huntress	Paul Levitz; Joe Staton; Joe Orlando; Bob Layton	DC Super Stars #17 (November/December 1977)	The daughter of the Batman and Catwoman of an alternate universe established in the early 1960s as the world where the Golden Age stories took place. She becomes Huntress after her parents are killed during an Apokoliptian invasion.
Timothy "Jace" Fox / Batman	(as Timothy Fox); Len Wein; Irv Novick (as Batman); Scott Snyder; Bryan Hitch	(as Timothy Fox); Batman #313 (April 1979) (as Batman); Dark Nights: Death Metal #7 (January 2021)	The son of Lucius Fox, Timothy Fox was an unruly and rebellious teen who fell into criminal activity, consistently disappointing his father. In the Infinite Frontier era, Tim was sent to military school following the accidental killing of a drunk man with his car. When he returned to Gotham, now going by Jace, he discovered his father's ties to Batman, finding a Batsuit in his basement. When Bruce Wayne was declared dead, he took up the mantle of Batman. After Wayne turned up alive, Jace moved to New York City, becoming the official Batman there and joining the NYPD's Special Crimes Unit, nicknamed "Strike Force Bat".

==== New Earth (Old canon) ====
Name	Creator(s)	First appearance	Fictional biography
Bat-Mite	Bill Finger; Sheldon Moldoff	Detective Comics #267 (May 1959)	A reality-altering imp from the Fifth Dimension Bat-Mite made many early appearances as Batman's "biggest fan". Current continuity has treated him as a figment of Batman's imagination. During this, Bat-Mite described imagination as the Fifth Dimension and described himself as "the last fading echo of the voice of reason". After appearing in one of the covers of Detective Comics #27 for the 75th anniversary of Batman, Batmite got a miniseries set in the New 52. His New 52 counterpart was brasher than the original.
Jack Ryder / Creeper	Steve Ditko; Don Segall	Showcase #73 (April 1968)	A Gotham City television personality who lost his job and became a security guard which brought him into conflict with the mob. After he was almost killed, Ryder was saved by a scientist, transforming him into The Creeper.
Holly Robinson / Catwoman	Frank Miller; David Mazzucchelli	As Holly: Batman #404 (February 1987) As Catwoman: Catwoman (vol. 3) #53 (March 2006)	A former prostitute trained by Wildcat and her friend Selina Kyle, to briefly become the new Catwoman following the birth of Selina's daughter. In her civilian identity, retaining the skills she learned in training to become Catwoman, she was a primary character in Countdown. The series saw her receive extensive Amazonian training as part of Granny Goodness' scheme to acquire new Female Furies. In the series' denouement, she and former supervillain friend Harley Quinn return to civilian life in Gotham, together but later Holly decides to begin a new life elsewhere on her own with money she received after helping Selina steal Tommy Elliot's fortune. Holly does not appear in the New 52.
Rory Regan / Ragman	Robert Kanigher; Joe Kubert	Ragman #1 (August/September 1976)	A similarly vengeful vigilante hero operating in Gotham, Ragman wears a mystical suit of living rags that functions as a kind of golem.
Simon Dark	Steve Niles; Scott Hampton	Simon Dark #1 (October 2007)	A mysterious vigilante active in Gotham City, Simon Dark is a patchwork man constructed from the bodies of several dead children by a medical genius and a dark cult. Simon does not appear in the New 52.
Wendy Harris / Proxy	E. Nelson Bridwell; Alex Toth	Limited Collectors' Edition #C-41 (January 1976)	The daughter of the villain Calculator was paralyzed during an attack when she served with her brother on the Teen Titans. She acts as Oracle's sidekick and assists the new Batgirl; however, her connection to the rest of the Bat Family at large is unclear. Pre-Crisis, Wendy was the niece of detective Harvey Harris, a mentor to a young Bruce Wayne. Wendy does not appear in the New 52.
Kitrina Falcone / Catgirl	Tony Daniel; Sandu Florea	Batman #692 (December 2009)	Catgirl is Catwoman's sidekick. Kitrina is known for her abilities as an escape artist, first escaping from a locked box while tied up and thrown in the water by her uncle, Mario Falcone, and escaping from Catwoman while tied in an "inescapable knot". Kitrina does not appear in the New 52.
Lynx	Tony Daniel; Sandu Florea	Batman: Battle for the Cowl (March 2009)	Originally seen allied with Gotham's villains, Lynx would later be seen fighting alongside its heroes. After battling Red Robin, he comes to believe she is on his side. Lynx does not appear in the New 52.

=== Former members ===
==== Prime Earth ====
Name	Creator(s)	First appearance	Fictional biography
Lucius Fox	Len Wein; John Calnan	Batman #307 (January 1979)	Although far less privy to Bruce Wayne's personal life than his business dealings, Lucius Fox is a trusted close associate of Wayne as his business manager responsible for both Wayne Enterprises and the Wayne Foundation. Depending on Fox's incarnation, Lucius may know nothing of Bruce's secret life (such as Batman: The Animated Series); have some hints about it (such as Batman Begins), where he knows Bruce is doing something but prefers not to know exactly what, for the purpose of deniability; or know about it entirely, as is the case in The Batman and The Dark Knight, Batman: Arkham Knight, Batman: The Enemy Within as well as his current mainstream incarnation (The New 52/DC Rebirth).
David Zavimbe / Batwing	Grant Morrison; Chris Burnham	Batman Incorporated #5 (May 2011)	David Zavimbe and his brother Issac lost the parents to HIV/AIDS in the Congolese city of Tinasha and were afterward taken away from their orphanage to become child soldiers in General Keita's army known as the Army of the Dawn, for a war that ravaged his country. After disobeying orders to burn down a village to prevent Keita's enemy Okuru from escaping, Issac was sliced to death by the General, but David managed to drug him later that night and dropped him at Okuru's recruitment camp, where he was killed. David spent time at the Children's Harbor, an orphanage for former child soldiers, and later became a police officer in Tinasha. At some point, Zavimbe was chosen by Bruce Wayne to become the first Batwing and join Batman Incorporated as his representative in Tinasha. He would later sometime retire from the role and pass on the mantle to Luke Fox.
Claire Clover / Gotham Girl	Tom King; David Finch	DCU: Rebirth #1 (July 2016)	Claire Clover, bought the ability to use superpowers by trading in years of her life. With these powers, she could live two years at Superman's level, or hours as a god. If she wouldn't use her powers, it wouldn't affect her lifespan. She Made her first public appearance helping Batman save a commercial plane from a Kobra Cult terrorist attack. Being young and inexperienced, Batman decided to take her under his wing to make her a better hero.
Basil Karlo / Clayface	Bill Finger; Bob Kane	Detective Comics #40 (June 1940)	A former member of Batman's rogue gallery is recruited by Batwoman to join her and Batman's team in Detective Comics. Tim Drake invents a device for Basil Karlo to allow him to hold his human form long enough to be allowed to live a normal life as a human and then be able to switch back into Clayface to fight crime with the team. In Detective Comics issue #973, Clayface was shot by Batwoman when the insanity of his condition reached a point where he was a clear danger to innocent people's presumingly killing him. However, he was later revealed to be alive but with his powers reduced and having left the city.
Harold Allnut	Dennis O'Neil; Marv Wolfman; Alan Grant	The Question #33 (December 1989)	Harold was an aide of Batman's who helped design, make, and repair many of his gadgets. Harold was later killed by Hush. Harold does not appear in the New 52 but is alive again following DC Rebirth.
Mary Elizabeth "Bette" Kane / Bat-Girl / Flamebird / Hawkfire	(as Bat-Girl); Bill Finger; Bob Kane; Sheldon Moldoff (as Flamebird); Tom Grummett; George Pérez (as Hawkfire); W. Haden Blackman; J.H. Williams III	(as Bat-Girl); Batman #139 (April 1961) (as Flamebird); Secret Origins Annual #3 (1989) (as Hawkfire); Batwoman (vol. 2) #1 (November 2011)	A perky, blonde teenager and professional tennis player, Bette Kane became the original Batgirl to pursue the original Robin, Dick Grayson. Now known as Flamebird, Bette is pursuing her dream to become her cousin, Kate Kane's apprentice. In the New 52, Bette has become Batwoman's sidekick and goes by Plebe and wears a grey jumpsuit after Kate burns her Flamebird costume. After she and Kate get into a spat, she goes out on patrol alone as Flamebird but ends up severely injured in a gang fight and goes into a coma. After she is released from the hospital, she acquires a new high-tech costume with actual pyrotechnic accents and becomes Hawkfire. She later tries to get Kate to reconcile with her uncle, Kate's father. In the DC Rebirth era, Bette has temporarily stopped being a vigilante and is attending West Point.
Julia Pennyworth	As Julia Remarque; Gerry Conway; Don Newton As Julia Pennyworth; Scott Snyder; James Tynion IV	As Julia Remarque; Detective Comics #501 (April 1981) As Julia Pennyworth; Batman (vol. 2) #28 (April 2014)	The daughter of Alfred and a French Resistance fighter named Mlle Marie, Julia was brought in as a potential love interest for Bruce. In the New 52, Julia is a Special Reconnaissance Regiment member and first appears in Hong Kong, where she notices the Batplane and seems not too pleased, fearing that Batman might ruin everything she has planned. Julia later meets Batman and tries to fight him off, telling him she has planned to take down the crime lord known as Shen Fang, whom Batman is also after. During the fight, Julia is impaled through the torso, so Bruce takes her with him back to Gotham. Julia later learns Batman's secret and her father's involvement in it and then joins them. She severed ties with Batman after her father is murdered by Bane, blaming Batman for not saving him.
Katherine "Kathy" Webb-Kane/Batwoman	Edmond Hamilton Sheldon Moldoff	Detective Comics #233 (July 1956)	In the original Pre-Crisis continuity, Kathy Kane is a wealthy Gotham City heiress and former circus performer who decides to use her skills and resources to become a costumed crimefighter. This is partly out of altruism and partly to attract the romantic attention of Batman. She remained his ally until her death at the hands of Bronze Tiger. In the New 52's title Batman Incorporated, it was revealed that Kathy was recruited into a covert spy organization called Spyral and as part of her first assignment, Kathy was tasked with tracking down Batman and discovering his true identity. She embarked on a career as a costumed crime-fighter while attempting to get close to Batman. Her plan succeeded but the two fell in love with one another. As a result, she refused to reveal his identity to her superiors at Spyral. Later, Kathy was threatened by Dr Dedalus to expose her to Batman unless she continued her mission. Heartbroken, she broke off her relationship with Bruce to save him. Kathy reappears alive in the concluding issue of Batman Incorporated, where she Identifies herself as St Hadrian's headmistress and requesting Batman not to go looking for her.
Violet Paige / Mother Panic	Jody Houser; Gerard Way; Tommy Lee Edwards	DC's Young Animal Ashcan Edition (2016)	A vengeful Gotham City vigilante with cybernetic enhancements who occasionally allied herself with Batman, who did not approve of her extremely violent methods.

==== New Earth (Old canon) ====
Name	Creator(s)	First appearance	Fictional biography
Talia al Ghul	Dennis O'Neil; Bob Brown; Dick Giordano	Detective Comics #411 (May 1971)	The daughter of Ra's al Ghul and is the mother of Damian. After learning of her son's intention to remain Robin, as well as his new devotion to his father's family, Talia has disowned Damian in favor of another son she will create, and put a bounty on his head as well as declared a personal war on Bruce Wayne. The clone eventually kills Damian, which Talia did not anticipate, and leaving the grieving Batman vindictive towards her and the clone. In the final issue of Batman Incorporated, Talia is killed by Kathy Kane.
Harvey Dent	Bill Finger; Bob Kane	Detective Comics #66 (August 1942)	The former District Attorney, and previously known as the villain Two-Face. He was deemed cured after his facial reconstruction surgery by Dr. Thomas Elliot. Dent was requested by Batman to watch over Gotham City during his one-year absence with Robin. Dent's style of justice has been more brutal than Batman's precision-style vigilantism. Upon Batman's return to Gotham, a series of grisly murders of several members of Batman's rogues' gallery points to Dent. When confronted by Batman, Dent blows up his apartment. The inner turmoil created by the situation forced Two-Face out of his psyche once again, and he is seen re-scarring his face with a scalpel and acid. In the New 52, in Batman and Robin #28 it is implied that Dent has achieved closure and that he commits suicide by shooting himself in the head.
Bane	Chuck Dixon; Doug Moench; Graham Nolan	Batman: Vengeance of Bane #1 (January 1993)	He would come to be an ally to Batman following their initial encounter; however, in the events surrounding Infinite Crisis, he appeared to return to his evil ways. Yet, he proves to walk a fine line as observed in the Secret Six. In the New 52, Bane has officially returned to being one of Batman's adversaries.
Edward Nygma / Riddler	Bill Finger; Dick Sprang	Detective Comics #140 (October 1948)	After waking up from a coma, he has gone "legit" and formed a well-known detective agency that sometimes helps Batman. When Riddler gets caught in a bomb explosion, the explosion re-awakened his psychosis. In the New 52, Riddler has officially returned to being one of Batman's adversaries.
Floyd Lawton / Deadshot	David Vern Reed; Lew Sayre Schwartz; Bob Kane	Batman #59 (June 1950)	He entered Gotham as what appeared to be another crimefighter. However, he would try to kill Batman to be the city's only hero. He would return later in the Suicide Squad, forced to help people but when he learned he had a daughter, he sought to wipe out gangs that threatened her home. As a member of the Secret Six, he often walks a line between cold-blooded killer and murderous saint. In the New 52, Deadshot has officially returned to his evil ways, being a member of the Suicide Squad.
Thomas Blake / Catman	Bill Finger; Jim Mooney	Detective Comics #311 (January 1963)	He started his career modelled after Catwoman and Batman as a foe to the latter. The Catman would also work for the Shade to help destroy remnants of Green Arrow's life as a hero after his apparent death, seemingly giving up crime and retiring. As a member of the Secret Six, Blake seems motivated to do good but is haunted by his violent, animal-like nature. Thomas reprises his established status as a core member of the Secret Six with the New 52 relaunch of the title.
Cheyenne Freemont	Bruce Jones; Joe Dodd	Nightwing #118 (May 2006)	A fashion designer and daughter of two metahumans, she is reluctant to use her abilities as her parents were run out of town for using theirs. Briefly involved with Dick Grayson, she creates a costume similar to Nightwing's and uses her powers to help Nightwing save Jason Todd from the Pierce brothers before retiring as the female Nightwing. Cheyenne does not appear in the New 52.
Sasha Bordeaux	Greg Rucka; Shawn Martinbrough	Detective Comics #751 (December 2000)	Bruce Wayne's former bodyguard. Events forced her from his side resulted in a long journey, arriving at the government organization known as Checkmate. After being turned into a partial OMAC cyborg, she now holds the title of Black Queen in the organization. Sasha does not appear in the New 52.
Onyx	Joey Cavalieri; Jerome Moore	Detective Comics #546 (January 1985)	Orpheus' bodyguard and protector. She took up his position as gang leader after Orpheus' death. A bond developed between Onyx and Cassandra Cain. After the events of Infinite Crisis, she was not seen in Gotham until Birds of Prey #114 in 2007, which reveals she has remained an active vigilante and a contact of Oracle. In the New 52, Onyx is the leader of the Fist Clan, a part of the Outsiders, a secret society composed by various clans built around a totem weapon.
Club of Heroes	Edmond Hamilton; Sheldon Moldoff	Detective Comics #215 (January 1955)	An international group of heroes largely made up of those inspired by Batman (counting him among their number). They would later disband but would reunite when the occasion arose. Several of their numbers went on to join Batman Inc.
Paul Kirk / Manhunter	Jack Kirby	Adventure Comics #58 (January 1941)	A masked man during World War II that became a pawn for the Council when they genetically altered him into an assassin. When Kirk learned that the council was using him and created clones of him as their soldiers, he joined with ninja master Asano Nitobe and Interpol agent Christine St. Clair to destroy the organization and kill his doubles. Kirk would add Batman to this group before his demise in his mission, the remaining trio continuing his work posthumously. An exception in this would be made for the clone Kirk DePaul. Neither Paul nor his clone appears in the New 52.
Mark Shaw / Manhunter	Jack Kirby	1st Issue Special #5 (August 1975)	A human infiltrator for the Manhunters that would later distance himself from the group and become the supervillain known as the Star-Tsar, infiltrating the Justice League as the Privateer. After some time in prison, he wiped his record clean with service in the Suicide Squad. Afterwards, he would again go by the name Manhunter as a bounty hunter working with Oracle operating largely out of New York. Shaw would take down several of Batman's rogues before the two met battling the Sportsmaster. In The New 52, Mark Shaw appears in the Forever Evil storyline as a U.S. Marshal who is assigned to find Barbara Minerva, the Cheetah. He is referred to as "one of the best manhunters" in the United States Marshals Service.
Kate Spencer / Manhunter	Marc Andreyko; Jesus Saiz	Manhunter (vol. 3) #1 (October 2004)	The granddaughter of the Phantom Lady that took up the Manhunter title and later joined the Birds of Prey. She is currently the district attorney for Gotham City where she at one point continued to operate alongside the Birds as Manhunter. In the New 52 continuity, Kate Spencer first appeared as part of the New 52 DC Universe in Batwoman (Volume 2) #2 by J.H. Williams III and W. Haden Blackman. She eventually retired from her superhero identity to raise her son, Ramsey, and went back to being a lawyer.
Jason Blood / Etrigan the Demon	Jack Kirby	The Demon #1 (August 1972)	Jason Blood is a demonologist based in Gotham who is bound to the demon Etrigan and occasionally assists Batman with magic-based cases. He was temporarily part of a backup Justice League established by Batman.
Dean Hunter / Nimrod	Alan Grant; Tim Sale	Batman: Shadow of the Bat #7 (December 1992)	He was framed for a crime he did not commit by the criminal named Chancer. Breaking out of prison, he stole a military suit of armour and sought to clear his name with Batman's help. In The New 52, a new version of Nimrod appears named Maxim Zarov, a highly skilled hunter who uses teleportation techniques and is a member of, or an associate with, the Anti-Superman Army.

== Gotham City Police Department ==
The GCPD were featured in their own series: the limited series Batman: GCPD and the ongoing series Gotham Central, in which they investigate the unusual crimes that plague the city, in a personal effort to minimize Batman's involvement. The Gotham Central series ended its 40-issue run in 2006.

Name	Creator(s)	First appearance	Fictional biography
James Worthington "Jim" Gordon	Bill Finger; Bob Kane	Detective Comics #27 (May 1939)	The police commissioner of Gotham City, is the most important member of the GCPD within the Batman mythos. Appearing alongside the main character in his first appearance, Gordon was the first Batman supporting character. Batman has a strong (though secret and unofficial) working relationship with him. Gordon, like other characters, has changed considerably over the years. Of particular note, is that in the early days of the characters, Gordon was not allied with Batman, and was more antagonistic towards him. However, he was a friend of Bruce Wayne. In "Batman: Year One", Gordon is portrayed as one of the few honest, non-corrupt Gotham cops. During "No Man's Land", Bruce offered him the knowledge of his secret identity, but Jim (still angry for Batman's early abandonment of Gotham in the days near the beginning of NML) refused to look and find out, hinting he may already know. Jim retired several months after NML, but returned to duty in the "One Year Later" storyline.
Harvey Bullock	as Lieutenant Bullock; Archie Goodwin; Howard Chaykin as Detective Harvey Bullock; Doug Moench; Don Newton	as Lieutenant Bullock; Detective Comics #441 (June 1974) as Detective Harvey Bullock; Batman #361 (July 1983)	He was brought in to be a pain in the side of Commissioner Gordon, but after accidentally causing a heart attack, his character repented, and has been a near constant presence since then. He is presented as being a slob and constantly suspected of corruption, but ultimately a good cop and strong ally to Gordon.
Renee Montoya	Bruce Timm; Paul Dini; Mitch Brian	Batman #475 (March 1992)	A character who was added into the comics in the 1990s as a character adapted from the animated series. She later quit the GCPD when her partner Crispus Allen was murdered and the man responsible got off, in addition to her sexual orientation being unwillingly outed. Following this she became a main character in the 52 limited series. Renee, who eventually took on the mantle of the Question, occasionally fights crime with the current Batwoman, who is her on-again-off-again lover. In The New 52, Renee appears in an image viewed by Kate Kane on the GCPD's wall of honor. She made her first full appearance in Detective Comics #41.
Crispus Allen	Greg Rucka; Shawn Martinbrough	Detective Comics #742 (March 2000)	A police veteran who is transferred to Gotham and partnered with Renee Montoya. He is later killed by Jim Corrigan, with his spirit becoming the Spectre.
Jason Bard	Frank Robbins; Gil Kane	Detective Comics #392 (October 1969)	A cop from Detroit hired by Jim Gordon and put into the MCU. He later helps Batman escape from a trap of GCPD led by the corrupt new Commissioner Jack Forbes. Prior to the New 52 reboot, he was originally introduced as a private investigator; pre-Crisis and post-Crisis, he was hired to be Batman's daytime liaison in the "Face the Face" storyline, and later worked for Robin during the outbreak of a gang war in Gotham City.

== DC superhero allies ==
Batman regularly interacts with other DC superheroes in titles such as Justice League of America. A few, however, have had a marked presence in the core Batman titles:

Name	Creator(s)	First appearance	Fictional biography
Clark Joseph Kent / Kal-El of Krypton / Superman	Jerry Siegel; Joe Shuster	Action Comics #1 (cover-dated June 1938; published April 18, 1938)	As the two earliest superheroes, Batman and Superman are frequent costars in each other's titles, and are often used to highlight differences between vigilantism and lawful crimefighting. In the early crossovers, the Man of Steel and the Dark Knight were usually depicted as good friends who cheerfully assisted one another against foes who were too big to be dealt with alone. In more recent times, their friendship has been depicted as more uneasy, but still with a deep amount of respect. In the current chronology, Batman and Superman first encounter one another early in their careers when Superman arrives in Gotham City to arrest the notorious "outlaw" known as Batman, just as Batman is investigating a murderous criminal named Magpie. Superman left this encounter with Batman, believing he had the best of intentions, though disagreeing with Batman's methods. As Superman flew back to Metropolis, Batman lamented to himself that Superman was a remarkable individual and that "perhaps, in another lifetime, he might call the Man of Steel his friend". They have collaborated many times in the years since then, learning each other's secret identities, recognizing that their goals are essentially the same, and despite their frequent tense relationship, are close allies and friends. Superman has entrusted Lex Luthor's Kryptonite ring to Batman, as a weapon to be used against Superman in case the Man of Steel should ever be turned against the people of Earth. In keeping with that attitude, Batman and Superman are often depicted as being the opposite sides of the same coin, both products of their environments, as indicated in their vastly different styles of crime-fighting. Superman became a hero because he subscribed to wholesome idealism, while Batman was motivated by personal tragedy and a troubled past. Regardless, after one instance of Batman using the ring to prevent a mind-controlled Superman from wrongdoing, Superman told Batman that he knew he "gave the ring to the right person". Batman shook his hand, and simply said, "What're friends for?"
Oliver Queen / Green Arrow	Mort Weisinger; George Papp	More Fun Comics #73 (November 1941)	He began as a character very much inspired by Batman. He had a youthful ward, Speedy, much like Robin, as well as an Arrowcave, an Arrowcar, and an Arrowplane, similar to Batman's equipment. Most of these gimmicks were stripped away by the 1970s, when both Batman and the Green Arrow were revamped into more serious characters. Batman and the Green Arrow have often been partners, especially during the 1970s, when Batman's team-up title, The Brave and the Bold, was one of the few places outside of the pages of JLA where the Emerald Archer could be found. As with Superman, early team-ups between Batman and the Green Arrow were very friendly, but their relations became strained in more recent incarnations. Batman and the Green Arrow's interactions in the 1980s were often employed as counterpoints to differing techniques and political philosophies. Queen and Batman's relationship was further strained by the involvement of the Green Arrow in the mindwiping events that happened in the pages of Identity Crisis, even though Queen voted against the mindwiping of Dr. Light and Batman, but this seems to have been forgiven for reasons still unknown. Today, the Green Arrow is frequently depicted as one of the few superheroes willing to stand up to Batman directly.
Zatanna Zatara	Gardner Fox; Murphy Anderson	Hawkman #4 (November 1964)	A powerful sorceress, stage magician, and a former member of the Justice League of America. Her father, John Zatara, trained a young Bruce Wayne in escapology. Zatanna and Bruce have a working friendship in the comics, with Bruce calling her for assistance from time to time. Zatanna's standing with Batman after the events of Identity Crisis was initially very strained, but the pair made their peace to the point where she proposed that they start a relationship, but Bruce told her he cares too much about her to bring her into his world.
Dinah Laurel Lance / The Black Canary	Dennis O'Neil; Dick Dillin	Justice League of America #220 (November 1983)	A former member of the Justice Society and of Oracle's covert team in Birds of Prey as well as being the wife of the Green Arrow, a founding member of the Justice League of America, and its current chairperson. The relationship between Black Canary and Batman has not been stressed by the events of Identity Crisis, even though Black Canary was involved with the group who mindwiped Dr. Light.
Helena Wayne / Huntress	Paul Levitz; Joe Staton; Joe Orlando; Bob Layton	DC Super Stars #17 (November/December 1977)	The daughter of an alternate version of Bruce Wayne (Batman) and Selina Kyle (Catwoman) from Earth-Two. She was also the only Robin to her father's Batman identity and a more ruthless character than was previously seen at the time. Helena adopts the Huntress identity after accidentally arriving on Prime Earth through a Boom Tube, after the death of both her parents.
Patrick "Eel" O'Brian / Plastic Man	Jack Cole	Police Comics #1 (August 1941)	A crook who developed superpowers after falling into a chemical bath, deciding afterward to change his ways. Joining the FBI and the All-Star Squadron, he would make a life for himself in Gotham. During a case where the JLA fought the Injustice Gang, Plastic Man was brought into the League by Batman to help, shortly thereafter joining the group. During this time, O'Brian became close to Batman and came to rely on him as a close friend, often the Dark Knight being the only person able to motivate the elastic hero to action.
Vic Sage / The Question	Steve Ditko	Blue Beetle #1 (June 1967)	Originally a Charlton Comics superhero, created by Steve Ditko, Vic Sage was revamped by Dennis O'Neil in 1987. Since the late 1990s, the Question has had a recurring supporting role in various Batman titles. Sage died of lung cancer in 52 Week 38; former GCPD detective Renee Montoya is now the new Question.
Richard Dragon	Dennis O'Neil; Jim Berry	Dragon's Fists novel (1974)	As one of the martial artists in the DC Universe, Denny O'Neil's Richard Dragon appears occasionally in Batman-related titles. Dragon is involved in training the modern Huntress, and allusions are made to his involvement training Batman himself.
Hiro Okamura / Toyman	Jeph Loeb; Ed McGuinness	Superman (vol. 2) #127 (September 1997)	A 13-year-old genius from Japan. He was recruited by Superboy and Robin (Tim Drake) after he successfully created the composite Superman/Batman ship that saved Earth. He now works with Batman to create customized equipment and weapons, replacing Harold. Hiro is later discovered to be one of several robots who fills in for the real Toyman while he is incarcerated; this was revealed in Action Comics #865.
Theodore Stephen "Ted" Kord / The Blue Beetle	Steve Ditko	Captain Atom #83 (November 1966)	A close friend of Oracle (sometimes working with the Birds of Prey), served with Batman in the League, and an idol to Tim Drake. Before his death, his company became a subsidiary to Wayne Industries.
Alan Scott / Green Lantern	Martin Nodell	All-American Comics #16 (July 1940)	The Green Lantern of the Golden Age who lives and works in Gotham City.
The Justice Society of America	Gardner Fox; Everett E. Hibbard; Sheldon Mayer	All Star Comics #3 (Winter 1940–1941)	Since the end of World War II, the JSA was headquartered in Gotham in a brownstone.
Thomas Tresser / Nemesis	Cary Burkett; Dan Spiegle	The Brave and the Bold #166 (September 1980)	He sought to clear the name of his brother; brainwashed by the Council into becoming an assassin and taking down that same organization. During this, he would find an ally in Batman and the pair teamed together until Nemesis was successful in his goals.
Tatsu Yamashiro / Katana	Mike W. Barr; Jim Aparo	The Brave and the Bold #200 (July 1983)	Initially meeting at the formation of the Outsiders, she moved to Gotham in the penthouse that served as the group's base of operations. During her years as a member, Katana became close friends with Batman, occasionally teaming with him when he called upon her. When President Luthor formed a group of individuals led by Captain Atom to apprehend Superman and Batman, the Dark Knight entrusted Katana as his spy within.
Ted Grant / Wildcat	Bill Finger; Irwin Hasen	Sensation Comics #1 (January 1942)	An original member of the Justice Society of America and an ex-heavyweight champion boxer, trained a young Bruce Wayne at one point. The two have remained close allies, and Batman has been quoted as saying that Grant is one of the few fighters he respects.
Roy Harper / Arsenal / Red Arrow	As Roy Harper / Speedy: Mort Weisinger; George Papp As Arsenal: Marv Wolfman; Tom Grummett As Red Arrow: Mark Waid; Alex Ross	As Roy Harper / Speedy: More Fun Comics #73 (November 1941) As Arsenal: The New Titans #99 (July 1993) As Red Arrow: Justice League of America (vol. 2) #7 (May 2007)	Originally known as Speedy. Member of the Titans, the Outsiders and the Outlaws, partner and friend of the Green Arrow, Nightwing and the Red Hood. Occasionally has been aided by Batman himself.
Connor Hawke / Green Arrow	Kelley Puckett; Jim Aparo	Green Arrow (vol. 2) #0 (October 1994)	Oliver Queen's son and successor. Ally of Batman and Nightwing and Batman's agent in the ploy to take down the Injustice Gang.
Gotham and Gotham Girl	Tom King and David Finch	DC Rebirth (July 2016)	Claire and Henry Clover Jr. operate as twins with Superman-like powers, having bought them through their family's money, trading in their lives for them as the powers would affect their life-span. The two would assist Batman against Solomon Grundy and the Kobra cult. Henry was killed by the Psycho Pirate while an unstable Claire later joined Thomas Wayne/Batman.
Aquaman	Mort Weisenger and Paul Norris	The Brave and the Bold	They also appear several times together in the series.

== Antagonists ==
Batman comics have introduced many classic villains. His rogues gallery is one of the most identifiable in modern fiction. The Joker, the Riddler, Catwoman, Two-Face, Harley Quinn, and the Penguin are some of the most recognizable foes; other notable villains include Poison Ivy, Ra's al Ghul, Mr. Freeze, the Scarecrow, Bane, Killer Croc, the Mad Hatter, and Clayface, among others. Some of Batman's rogues gallery are notable for sometimes functioning as allies as well as villains. Some examples of this are Catwoman, the Riddler, Poison Ivy, Two-Face (Harvey Dent), the Red Hood, Anarky, and Talia al Ghul. Emphasis on the psychological motivations of Batman villains have painted them in a much more sympathetic light than in their earlier stories, most notably Mr. Freeze and the Ventriloquist in their Batman: The Animated Series incarnations.

== Love interests ==
Unlike his peers from DC Universe, like Superman, Flash, Green Lantern etc., Batman never had an official single love interest, but several of them in its publishing history.

=== Bruce Wayne's love interests ===
- Selina Kyle (Catwoman):
  - Catwoman is the most enduring romantic interest of Batman/Bruce Wayne. In All Star Batman and Robin the Boy Wonder Batman's feelings towards her are based on the fact that she is sort of a female version of himself: another dark, beautiful creature that prowls in the night. In the current timeline, Batman and Catwoman became romantically involved during the Batman: Hush story arc. Batman ended the relationship because he was afraid if they had a relationship that Hush would use her to get to him and also doubted her loyalty to him questioning if she was part of the plot to destroy his life. Even when their romance rekindled later on, Batman still suspected that Selina's reformation could be a result of a personality-altering mindwipe by Zatanna. Later in Batman: Heart of Hush in an attempt to kill Bruce, Hush kidnaps Catwoman and cuts out her heart, when Bruce returns the heart he admits to Selina that she really was the only woman to have held his heart and that he would always love her.
  - In Pre-Crisis continuity, the Earth-Two versions of Batman and Catwoman were shown to have married in the 1950s, and later Selina gave birth to a daughter, Helena Wayne (alias Huntress) in 1957.
  - In Tim Burton's film Batman Returns, Selina (played by Michelle Pfeiffer) seems to be the true love of Bruce's life, as not only their costumed identities but also their disturbed psyches are described as similar. Their relationship becomes intensely dramatic towards the end of the movie, to the point where Bruce actually implores her to abandon her vendetta against Max Shreck and come and live with him in Wayne Manor. She was set to reappear in Batman Forever, portrayed again by Pfeiffer, but Joel Schumacher scrapped the idea.
  - In Christopher Nolan's film The Dark Knight Rises, Selina Kyle (never referred to as Catwoman in the film) is portrayed by Anne Hathaway as she is in the comics as a thief who aids Bane in hopes of obtaining the "clean slate" drive to erase her criminal record and to see the rich and selfish of Gotham suffer. She later aids Batman in stopping Bane after realizing her mistake of betraying him to the terrorist, giving up her own chance to escape Gotham and leave him behind. At the film's end, she is seen in Italy wearing Martha Wayne's necklace (which she stole earlier on in the film) and dating Bruce Wayne, who has retired from the mantle of Batman.
  - In Batman: The Animated Series, Bruce Wayne regularly dates Selina Kyle. In Batman Beyond, Bruce hints at a relationship with Selina in his past, as well as comparing that relationship with Terry's and the current Ten of the Royal Flush Gang. As in comic books, the sexual tension between their costumed characters is a major story point in Batman: The Animated Series. In the comic book adaption Batman: Gotham Adventures #33, the Phantom Stranger shows Bruce a world where he never became Batman, married Selina and had two sons.
  - In Batman: the Brave and the Bold, Batman and Catwoman marry in an alternate future and she is the mother of Damian. However, this future is later revealed to have all been a story written by Alfred Pennyworth.
  - After The New 52, as it is Selina's early days as Catwoman she does not yet know Batman's identity, though it is evident they engaged in sexual intercourse.
  - In Gotham, a 14-year-old Selina Kyle witnesses the murders of Thomas and Martha Wayne. Because of that, she stays at Wayne Manor to be protected, where she befriends the young Bruce Wayne. She saves him from a gang of hired killers and gives him his first kiss. Since then, the young Bruce and Selina have formed a very close relationship.
- Talia al Ghul: The daughter of the supervillain, Ra's al Ghul, Talia's father has encouraged the relationship in hopes of recruiting Batman as his successor. Unlike Catwoman, Talia is more than willing to play second-fiddle to Bruce's mission.
  - The two are at odds, as Talia has been brainwashed into hating both her father and Batman; however, she claims to be the mother of his son Damian, introduced in Batman #656. However, after Damian is murdered by a clone created by her, Batman is no longer affectionate towards her as he was in the past due to her indirect involvement in their son's death, making him increasingly vengeful.
  - In the now out-of-continuity graphic novel Batman: Son of the Demon, Talia bore his son (later named Ibn al Xu'ffasch).
  - In Earth-22's Kingdom Come, Talia admires Batman in his drive, determination, and nobility, but is always torn between him and his love for her terrorist father.
  - In Christopher Nolan's film The Dark Knight Rises, Talia is played by actress Marion Cotillard. In the film, she is incognito as philanthropist and socialite Miranda Tate (a ploy used by her father with his false identity of Henri Ducard) and begins an affair with Bruce Wayne as well as becoming a Wayne Enterprises executive. Talia has assumed control of the League of Shadows and plans with Bane, who saved her as a child, to kill Bruce and destroy Gotham to fulfill her father's mission and have vengeance for his death.
- Julie Madison:
  - In the earliest Batman comics, Bruce Wayne dates the often-imperiled Julie Madison, an actress and socialite. The two eventually separate and Julie weds into European royalty, much in the manner of Grace Kelly.
  - In the New 52, Julie appears in a flashback-dream sequence as Bruce's college girlfriend. She reappeared later, this time in the present time, as she has moved back to Gotham and wants to be reunited with Bruce. Alfred imagines what it would be like if Bruce and Julie got together and made a family, having a life without Batman. Unfortunately, Bruce could not meet with Julie because he was busy with crime fighting, much to Alfred's displeasure. In Batman #43, Julie is the head of a clinic for underprivileged youth that Bruce Wayne is helping to finance and manage. After the events of Batman: Endgame, Bruce Wayne has begun a relationship with Julie and works for her in the clinic.
  - In Batman & Robin, Elle Macpherson plays Julie, Bruce's girlfriend, though the character seems to have little in common with her comic book self. The character adds little to the plot, and many of her scenes were edited out of the film's final cut.
- Vicki Vale:
  - In several 1950s stories, a reporter for the Gotham Gazette newspaper Vicki Vale, was shown as an occasional romantic interest of Batman. Vicki Vale returned in the early 1980s, brought back by Doug Moench.
  - Vale appeared in the second of Columbia's Batman serials, Batman and Robin, portrayed by Jane Adams.
  - Kim Basinger plays Vicki in the 1989 film Batman. In the movie, she has come to Gotham City to do a story on Batman, but she soon becomes romantically involved with Bruce Wayne, unaware that he and Batman are the same person. Eventually, Vicki does learn Bruce's secret identity. At the end of the film, Alfred Pennyworth chauffeurs her to Wayne Manor to await Bruce's return once the night's crime fighting is done. In Batman Returns, it is stated that she eventually left Bruce because she could not cope with his double life. In the early scripts of Returns, she was set to reappear, but Tim Burton scrapped the idea.
  - In the animated film The Batman vs. Dracula, Vale is romantically linked to Bruce Wayne, even going as far as to mention the kind of impact the death of his parents could have on him, hinting that Vicki may know he is Batman.
  - In the video game Batman: Arkham Knight, Vicky apologizes to Bruce Wayne about a news article, apparently published by Jack Ryder, and asks "Brucie" to call her back. When talking to Jack Ryder as Batman, he reveals that Vale is dating Bruce Wayne, although Wayne never mentioned this in the game itself.
- Katherine "Kathy" Webb-Kane (Batwoman)
  - In the original Pre-Crisis continuity, Kathy Kane is a wealthy Gotham City heiress and former circus performer who decides to use her skills and resources to become a costumed crimefighter. This is partly out of altruism and partly to attract the romantic attention of Batman. While Batman wished for Kane to retire from crimefighting due to the danger, she remained his ally. Kathy was romantically interested in Batman but Batman remained aloof until her death at the hands of Bronze Tiger. In the New 52's title Batman Incorporated, it was revealed that Kathy was recruited into a covert spy organization called Spyral and as part of her first assignment, Kathy was tasked with tracking down Batman and discovering his true identity. Donning a female variation of Batman's costume to gain his attention, she embarked on a career as a costumed crime-fighter while attempting to get close to Batman. Her plan succeeded but the two fell in love with one another, despite Kathy legally being Wayne's aunt through her marriage with his mother's brother, the late Nathan Kane. As a result, she refused to reveal his identity to her superiors at Spyral. Later, Kathy was threatened by Dr Dedalus to expose her to Batman unless she continued her mission. Heartbroken, she broke off her relationship with Bruce to save him from Dedalus' plan. Kathy reappears alive in the concluding issue of Batman Incorporated, in which she shoots Talia al Ghul dead in the Batcave, saving Batman's life. Identifying herself as St Hadrian's headmistress and requesting Batman not to go looking for her, she thanks Batman for leading Talia into her trap.
  - In a Pre-Crisis Earth-Two, Kathy, who is a middle-aged woman, is still in love with the now-deceased Commissioner Bruce Wayne.
  - In Batman: Mystery of the Batwoman, while investigating the identity of Gotham's newest masked vigilante, Batman develops an affection for one of the suspects, Kathy Duquesne, daughter of mob boss Carlton Duquesne.
- Linda Page:
  - Linda appeared during the Golden Age of Comics after Julie broke her engagement off with Bruce. A former socialite, she dedicated her time as a nurse for the elderly, instead of falling into the stereotype that rich women were spoiled and lazy. She dated Bruce for two years, but broke up with him when he would not explain why he seemed to be wooing another woman (trying to reform a disguised Catwoman).
  - Linda appeared in the first Batman serial (1943), portrayed by Shirley Patterson.
- Silver St. Cloud: A storyline in the late 1970s featured Silver St. Cloud, who managed to deduce the secret of Bruce Wayne's alter ego, but she could not handle being involved with someone in such a dangerous line of work. The two parted ways; 2005 six-issue miniseries Batman: Dark Detective features a return appearance of Silver St. Cloud, although the romance has not been rekindled. In Batman: The Widening Gyre, she and Bruce rekindle their romance on an island beach her family owns. Shortly after the two become engaged, Silver is murdered by the disguised villain Onomatopoeia by slicing Silver's throat and mimicking the sound of the blade.
  - In Gotham, a young Silver, the step-niece and ward of corrupt billionaire Theo Galavan, befriends and later starts dating the young Bruce Wayne, who is immediately smitten with her. Unbeknownst to him, Silver is helping Galavan in the Order of St. Dumas' plan to kill Bruce and take over Wayne Enterprises. Bruce plans a fake abduction of Silver and himself to make her reveal everything she knows about his parents and her uncle's plan. The plan works and Bruce finally sees Silver for who she really is, leaving her behind stunned and tearful. Later on in the series, Theo breaks into Wayne Manor and kidnaps Bruce. Silver, not wanting to witness Bruce's death, pretends she's feeling unwell. Theo accuses her of being weak and tells her to make Bruce fall in love with her again to prove she is worthy of the Dumas' name. She has a change of heart and tries to help Bruce escape, but their attempts are thwarted by Theo, and they're both jailed. Bruce, knowing about Silver's initial motivations, kisses her in front of Theo and forgives her. Bruce is then tied to a stake, where Father Creel prepares to kill him. Gordon and Oswald Cobblepot arrive with a group of henchmen and begin to fight the Order while Bruce is freed by Alfred and Selina Kyle. Theo and his sister, Tabitha, try to escape using parachutes. Before they go, Theo expresses his disappointment in Silver and appears as though he might kill her, but instead is knocked unconscious by Tabitha, who says she is tired of Theo's bullying. The women escape using the parachutes but leave Theo in the penthouse and he is then arrested by Gordon.
- Julia Pennyworth: The daughter of Alfred and a French Resistance fighter named Mlle. Marie, Julia was brought in by Gerry Conway in Detective Comics #501 (1981) as a potential love interest for Bruce. In the New 52, Julia is a Special Reconnaissance Regiment member and first appears in Hong Kong, where she notices the Batplane and seems not too pleased, fearing that Batman might ruin everything she has planned. Julia later meets Batman and tries to fight him off, telling him she has planned to take down the crime lord known as Shen Fang, whom Batman is also after. During the fight, Julia is impaled through the torso, so Bruce takes her with him back at Gotham. Initially dismissing Bruce as a useless fop and feeling that her father has wasted his life, once Julia learns about Bruce's life as Batman, she joins the team, basically taking on her father's role after Alfred is hospitalized by Hush's attack. She also assists the GCPD and the Powers Corporation when James Gordon temporarily became a corporate-sponsored Batman after the apparent death of the original Dark Knight.
- Vesper Fairchild: Fairchild's relationship with Bruce Wayne was established during Doug Moench's second run on Batman in the 1990s. A radio show host who left Gotham after the "No Man's Land" crisis, Fairchild was later killed by David Cain on orders from Lex Luthor as part of Luthor's attempt to get revenge on Bruce Wayne for his involvement in thwarting his attempt to take control of Gotham after "No Man's Land" ended.
- Jezebel Jet: A wealthy former supermodel of African descent. She is said to own an African province. Like Bruce, she lost her parents at a young age. Though she resisted Bruce's affections at first, she ultimately began a relationship with him. As a result, she discovered that Bruce was Batman just before Batman R.I.P.. Later, she is revealed to be a member of the Black Glove, a villainous organization aimed at defeating Batman. She was apparently killed by a flock of Man-Bat Commandos created by Talia but was later hinted to have somehow survived in Batman Inc. #8. Her death was confirmed in Batman Incorporated: Leviathan Strikes! #1.
- Lois Lane: In the pre-Flashpoint continuity, Lois knew Bruce Wayne was Batman and they still have a very close friendship. Lois also helps him keep an eye on the "reformed" Penguin while at a party of Wayne's.
  - In an imaginary story, in Superman's Girlfriend, Lois Lane #89, Lois and Bruce not only were dating but they eventually got married.
  - In a crossover between Superman: The Animated Series and The New Batman Adventures, World's Finest, Bruce Wayne dates Daily Planet star reporter Lois Lane after meeting her at Metropolis Airport. However, she breaks off the relationship after she discovers that he is Batman. Bruce points out the irony to Superman that she likes Bruce Wayne and Superman, but not their respective alter egos.
- Sasha Bordeaux: Assigned as Bruce Wayne's bodyguard, Bordeaux deduced that Bruce was Batman. She was framed for Fairchild's murder and later joined Maxwell Lord's Checkmate organization. During The OMAC Project, Bordeaux was turned into a cyborg OMAC, but this incident has since been resolved. While Bordeaux and Batman kissed near the end of The OMAC Project, their relationship seems to have passed on.
- Diana of Themyscira/Diana Prince (Wonder Woman): Diana and Bruce briefly dated within the pages of the Justice League of America comics but nothing came of the relationship and the two remain friends. In Blackest Night: Wonder Woman, their past relationship is referenced when Wonder Woman is able to use her feelings, for Bruce to throw off the influence of her Black Lantern ring and join the Star Sapphires.
  - The mutual romantic interest is echoed in the Justice League animated series and its sequel series, but Bruce and Diana seem to grow very close in both shows and care deeply for one another, and even Batman hints at romance between them in the episodes "This Little Piggy" and "Once and Future Thing: Weird Western Tales", in the former episode however while she is interested in pursuing a relationship he is not and he says that he cannot be with her for the following reasons: dating on the team would lead to disaster (presumably referring to the ill-fated relationship between John Stewart and Hawkgirl), that they are very different people and his fear that Diana would end up becoming a target for his enemies who would seek to threaten him via a loved one in spite of her demonstrations of being perfectly capable of handling difficult situations. In the comic book adaptation of the DCAU Batman Beyond Universe, however, revealing that she marries Batman's Justice Lord counterpart, leaving him heartbroken of losing his chance with her.
- Dinah Laurel Lance (Black Canary): Although Black Canary has a relationship with Green Arrow, she has shown an attraction to the Dark Knight and she and Batman have shared kisses from time to time.
  - In Thrillkiller '62, Batman and Dinah Drake Lance share a kiss.
  - In All-Star Batman and Robin the Boy Wonder #7, the two show more of an attraction to one another. As she watches Batman in action, she gets exhilarated. As the fight concludes, she leaps down and begins kissing Batman. The two maintain their passion for a short time until Batman decides it is time to leave. He offers to give Black Canary a lift home.
- Zatanna Zatara: In Detective Comics #843-844, Zatanna and Bruce talk about the possibility of having a more meaningful relationship. But later they both understand that Bruce could not give her the relationship she wishes for due to his focus on crime-fighting.
  - In Batman: The Animated Series, while a young Bruce Wayne studies escape artistry under Zatara the Magician, he has a relationship with Zatara's daughter. When she later becomes the magician crimefighter, Zatanna, she and Batman maintain a working relationship.
- Bekka: Orion's wife, she and Batman had a strong attraction to each other after she rescued him from Darkseid's forces on the planet Tartarus. She was later murdered.
  - In Justice League Beyond, when the new Batman, Terry McGinnis, visits Apokolips and meets Queen Bekka, she makes a pass at him and it is alluded that Bruce and Bekka had a fling, with a now older Bruce not wanting to talk about it and Superman saying "it's complicated".
- Pamela Lillian Isley (Poison Ivy): Batman's attraction to Ivy is present in some way in several mediums in which the characters appear. There has always been a sexual tension between the two, most notably in their canonical earlier encounters. In her first appearance, Ivy is established as having an attraction to Batman, and tries to convince Batman to join her side and creates love potions that ensnare him. In the 1997 story Batman: Poison Ivy, Christopher DeJardin tries to kill Ivy, and Batman takes the bullet. Batman, who was wearing body armor, knocks him out. Ivy considers his saving her from death as proof he loves her, though he responds that she does not know the meaning of the word. Her attraction is confirmed in Widening Gyre. At first, Ivy's infatuation with Batman was one-sided; later stories presented the attraction as more mutual, but hindered by reluctance on Batman's part. She later kisses Bruce during a robbery, poisoning him; when she subsequently kisses a dying Batman, she unknowingly cures her intended victim and establishes a budding romantic tension between them. During the "No Man's Land" story arc, Batman comes to her rescue while she is held captive by Clayface, with Ivy remarking that she knew he would. In Batman: Pavane (1989), while being interviewed as a potential candidate for the Suicide Squad, Pamela reveals to Inspector Stuart on how she became Poison Ivy. When she heard about Batman, she instantly fell in love with him—believing him to be the “perfect man”; going so far as to make a love shrine of him. With her goal set, she moved to Gotham, created a costume and renamed herself “Poison Ivy”; she then began committing crimes for the purpose of getting his attention in the hopes of them becoming the #1 crime couple. Unfortunately for Pamela, it did not work out the way she wanted it to, and so she was apprehended and sent to Arkham Asylum. In Batman: Hothouse (1992), Batman gains an obsession with Isley. Later, she kisses him. Now completely deranged, Ivy thinks herself "Titania, Queen of the May", and Batman her Oberon - as Batman struggles with the hallucinations induced by the kiss, she pins him down and prepares to unmask him. With his last burst of strength, Batman kicks the greenhouse's sprinklers on, washing away Ivy's pheromones. The sobered Batman chases an increasingly desperate Ivy onto the greenhouse's catwalks, where he barely manages to save Ivy from falling to her death. Subsequently, Ivy is returned to Arkham Asylum, her twisted love for Batman now stronger than ever. In one of the annuals of Batman: Shadow of the Bat, a mutual attraction between Poison Ivy and the Batman is obvious right from the start. Ivy considers Batman "the perfect man", and in a conversation with his butler, Alfred Pennyworth, he admits to finding her attractive and more appealing than Catwoman. In the Batman Chronicles (1995) story Passion's Fruit (1997), Ivy is depicted as feeling lonely and deeply missing Batman while at Arkham Asylum. She hatches a scheme to unleash some of her plant creations to cause havoc in Gotham, multiplying at contact with water, until Batman finally pays her a visit at the asylum. In exchange for the visit and a kiss, she morphs her creations into harmless strawberry plants. She is later in improved spirits. In Poison Ivy: Cast Shadows (2004), Batman and Ivy work together to find a killer carrying out a series of Ivy-like murders at Arkham. His butler, Alfred Pennyworth, notes that Batman has been poisoned by the flowers. Batman tells Alfred he must kiss Poison Ivy for the cure, and that if he fails Alfred must kill him. Ivy and Batman confront each other, where Batman warns Ivy that he will have to knock her out to kiss her to make sure that she does not kill him when he passes out after being cured. Ivy insists for him to trust her, despite Batman's doubts. Batman at first decides to punch her, hesitates, then they embrace and kiss passionately instead. Upon being cured, he falls, but saves himself, and saves Ivy as Gotham Tower collapses when — assuming Batman dead — Ivy tries to kill herself, once more insinuating that it is more than just lust she feels for him. Ivy and Batman share a moment together speaking, watching her plant creations create light, and Batman compliments her on her talent. Batman takes Ivy back to Arkham Asylum, so that Ivy can finish her rehabilitation. Discouraged, Ivy complains to Batman about the lack of light in her cell, and Batman responds that there is nothing he can do about it, before departing. Transferred to a new cell the next morning, Ivy is stunned when she discovers that someone has had her room moved to a special cell where she can be in the sunlight, and has been filled with flowers as a gift. Upon being told some "anonymous benefactor" wanted to make sure her time is not as daunting as it might have been, a touched Ivy smiles and thanks Batman. In Gothtopia, Batman comes to her rescue when he realizes she was telling him the truth, even though he put her in Arkham. First, she punches him for not believing her claims, and then she kisses him for coming to her rescue, poisoning him with her mind control toxin. Resisting it, he warns that they would be best off helping each other for now. Thanks to her own resistance and the kiss he received, both Batman and Ivy become immune to the effects of the Scarecrow's fear gas. The relationship even briefly deviated from the Batman/Ivy relationship into a Bruce/Pamela one when, in the comic series Batman: Gotham Knights, he helps her return to normal. In The New 52, Ivy is shown to have some level of infatuation with Batman, even calling him "the only one" for her, though this is no longer apparent from DC Rebirth onwards.
  - She is portrayed in the 1997 film Batman & Robin by Uma Thurman. At a charity ball, she unexpectedly appears to get the Heart of Isis diamond necklace. Blowing around a wisp of pheromone dust, she offers the auctioneers present a night with her. Batman and Robin, also hit by the pheromone dust, get in on the auctioning action themselves.
  - In Gotham, a young Ivy "Pamela" Pepper (portrayed by Clare Foley) is shown to have a crush on a young Bruce Wayne, in the episode "Lovecraft". Later on, in "A Beautiful Darkness", an artificially aged-up Ivy (portrayed by Peyton List) kisses Bruce on the lips so as to hypnotise him, even though she could've done so by simply making him smell the scent of her perfume, like how she hypnotised everyone else. In "The Trial of Jim Gordon", Ivy interrupts Bruce and Selina's date, having come to take Bruce to use him in her plan. She states that Bruce will love her, and after hypnotising him once more, kisses him again.
- Natalia Knight (Nocturna): Nocturna a.k.a. Natalia Knight. Created by Doug Moench in the early 1980s. She was a jewel thief who briefly adopted Jason Todd and knew that Bruce Wayne was Batman. She had a rare "light sensitivity" disease and her skin was bleached white. She disappeared during the last days of Pre-Crisis Batman after being stabbed by her step-brother Charles (originally known as the Thief of Night and then known as Night-Slayer), floating into the crimson sky of the Crisis in her balloon.
- April Clarkson (Midnight): A Lieutenant of the Gotham PD, who was against Batman and was taking credit for his work. April was working on the same case as Batman did, searching for the murderous villain, Midnight. During her investigation, she gets a visit from Batman and both are surprised by an unexpected attraction. In his civilian identity, Bruce begins to flirt with April, although being aware that she is working on the same case. She initially rejects him, but he becomes more attracted to her. Batman's attraction towards April is noticed by his closest allies, who warn him to be careful. In the end, April is revealed to be the psychopathic murderer.
- Jaina "Jai" Hudson (White Rabbit): The daughter of an American diplomat and a Bollywood actress, a charity fundraiser organizer who meets Bruce Wayne at one of her charity functions to raise funds for relief in Pakistan. During the event there was a flirtatious exchange between the two. They later began dating. During that time, Batman encountered a mysterious criminal called White Rabbit. Batman first meets her during the breakout of Arkham Asylum, where she teased Batman and the Gotham City Police Department before running off into the corridors. He later finds the alluring White Rabbit, responding to a tip off about the location of the Joker, but she only continues to tease him and asks him to chase her. Batman chases her for answers but when he finally finds her in a compartment, White Rabbit is seen lounging over the Joker (Clayface in disguise). After his fight with Clayface, White Rabbit sensually strokes Batman's face as she prepares to inject him with an unknown substance but is interrupted by the Flash. Later, White Rabbit leads Batman to a confrontation with Scarecrow and Bane. Escaping, White Rabbit returns to Jaina's home and they combine into a single person.
- Mio (Penumbra): A young assassin, working for Ra's al Ghul, who fell in love with Bruce Wayne during his training to become Batman.
- Madolyn Corbett: A close associate of Bruce Wayne, who was obsessed with him. Her fascination with him led her to begin stalking him outside his house. After he rejected her offer of marriage, she soon killed herself and tried to frame Bruce for it.
- Erin and Shannon McKillen: Erin McKillen and her twin sister Shannon were born into the McKillen crime family. When they were little, they attended school with Bruce Wayne and Erin used to steal kisses from him but Bruce was fonder of Shannon as they were very close and she also was the first person to make him talk about his parents after their deaths. Upon the death of their father, the two sisters took control of the McKillen family and with the pass of time they did not keep in touch with Bruce. They were eventually arrested and sent to Blackgate Penitentiary, betrayed by their defense attorney, Harvey Dent. With their escape from prison resulting in the death of Shannon, Erin decided to leave Gotham, but not before taking her revenge on Dent. When she returned to Gotham years later she confronts Batman who after a fight merely welcomes her back to Gotham, putting her in jail once again. In the jail Erin calls Bruce, who is unsure of why she called him at all. Erin responds that she had wanted to reach out to one of her oldest friends. Later Bruce moves Erin to the Wayne Manor to protect her from Two Face and anyone else who wants her dead. Recalling back to their childhood, Erin wonders which of the McKillen sisters Bruce liked more with him admitting it was Shannon. Before leaving the Manor, Bruce offers her a moral lesson of Cherokee origin as there is still hope for Erin, in his eyes. Later having saved her from both Two Face and the crime families who are after her, Batman asks her help in locating Dent who is in danger but she leads him on so he cannot prevent Dent's execution. Batman decides to eject Erin from the car, leaving her for the cops.
- Shondra Kinsolving: Shondra is a psychic and the half-sister of Benedict Asp. She had a brief love affair with Batman, having been brought in to help him when he broke his back. Before Bruce could officially commit to her, Benedict kidnapped her and turned her abilities to evil use. Batman eventually defeated Benedict, but the damage to Shondra's mind was too great. As she healed Bruce's lingering injuries, Shondra's psyche regressed back into childhood. However, she made a cameo in Batman: Hush as one of the doctors assisting in Bruce Wayne's operation, indicating she has much recovered. Prior to her abduction, Batman was about to propose her marry him and then retire from crime-fighting.
- Jillian Maxwell: In Batman: Legends of the Dark Knight Halloween Special #1, (reprinted in the trade paperback Batman: Haunted Knight) during the beginning of his career, Bruce finds himself attracted to a woman who called herself Jillian Maxwell after meeting her at a costume party. However, Alfred's suspicion of her led him to checking her background, discovering a criminal record of a woman, whose description matches Jillian's, who used the aliases of Kathryn Cole, Christine Gherard, Diana Lopez, Pamela Weisman, and many other identities to seduce young wealthy men for their fortunes, then later arrange events that led to their deaths so she can have their wealth. After Alfred told Bruce of this, he was heartbroken, but Bruce kept an eye on the woman. When she used the identity Audrey Marguerite in Brazil, Bruce, as Batman, sent her a note, telling her to confess all her crimes.
- Rachel Caspian: In a 1987 storyline "Batman: Year Two", Bruce Wayne falls in love with Rachel. Unfortunately, Rachel's father moonlighted as a murderous vigilante who committed suicide once losing a battle against a gun-wielding Batman. Discovery of her father's evils drove Rachel to pay her father's penance on his behalf by enrolling in a nunnery and breaking off her engagement with Bruce Wayne, who had prepared himself to end his crime fighting career to marry her.
- Lorna Shore: In Batman Confidential - Lovers & Madmen, Bruce met a museum curator Lorna Shore during the beginning of his career. It was love at first sight as Bruce was able to find peace when he was with her for the first time since he was 8 years old after his parents' murder. However, after his encounter with the Joker and realizing that there will be more enemies like him, he broke off their relationship to protect Lorna. Lorna later left the city, feeling that Gotham is not safe anymore because of Batman and the Joker.
- Mallory Moxon: Mallory became involved in Bruce's life when Philo Zeiss wanted revenge on her father, Lew Moxon. Bruce has spent as a child a happy summer with her before his parents were killed. He meets her again years later in a reception to honor Moxon's return to Gotham City. The next night he dines with the Moxons, partly to renew his friendship with Mallory. However, he discovers that Mallory is as much a part of the criminal world as her father. She falls in love with Bruce and is protected by Batman. Mallory was still with her father during Bruce's conviction of being a murderer even though she knew what kind of man her father was.
- Amina Franklin: A doctor in Leslie Thompkins' clinic in Gotham City, she dated Bruce Wayne for a short time before she ends things with him. A Russian mobster targeted Amina as a means of avenging himself against her allegedly deceased brother Wayne but Batman arrived in time to prevent him from harming Amina. She was killed by her deranged brother Grotesk, who was revealed to be alive.
- Dawn Golden: One time girlfriend, fiancé and childhood friend of Bruce Wayne. When they first met, Bruce did not like Dawn too much but the two eventually grew closer and ended up dating until she apparently broke Bruce's heart in college. Years later, Dawn would grow into a Gotham socialite but mysteriously go missing. She was actually kidnapped by Killer Croc, hired by a vengeful Penguin whom she had humiliated along with her friends when she invited him in a dance where unattractive men would be their dancing partners. Dawn was eventually found by Batman, she was revealed to be placed in some sort of heating room, awaiting her death. Batman would also protect her from demons sent by her father, Aleister, to kidnap her. Dawn finally dies when her father stabbed her with a knife, completing a ritual that would grant him eternal life.
- Charlotte Rivers: A TV anchorwoman who's visiting Gotham City to cover gruesome slayings and has a romantic relation with Bruce Wayne.
- Natalya Trusevich: A Ukrainian accomplished pianist, and girlfriend to Bruce Wayne. She was killed by Mad Hatter after she refused to reveal Batman's identity, thrown from a helicopter with her body crashed into the Bat-Signal.

==== In alternate universes ====
- Laura Avian: In Batman: Masque, Laura is a young and upcoming ballerina who is caught between her two loves, Bruce Wayne and the mysterious Phantom.
- Jessica Dent: In Batman: Earth One, Jessica is Harvey Dent's twin sister and childhood sweetheart of Bruce Wayne. She was President of the Board of Supervisors who, along with her brother, investigated the rumored illicit activities of Mayor Oswald Cobblepot. She was appointed the new Mayor of Gotham City after Cobblepot's death. Jessica and Bruce grew closer and closer through the years and eventually begun dating, ignoring Harvey's dismay. After Harvey's death, Jessica's face was burned with acid and she began losing her mind.
- Glenda Mark: In Batman/Demon: A Tragedy, Glenda was romantically involved with the wealthy eccentric Bruce Wayne in Gotham City. Unbeknownst to either of them, he was a human cage for the evil bat-demon Etrigan. Glenda worked to find a cure for Bruce's fake "allergy to moonlight". Glenda was disturbed that her research showed no record of Bruce Wayne's parents, and every portrait of his ancestors looked identical to Bruce. Etrigan threatens to kill Glenda, and Bruce has his memory wiped to protect her. Despite this, Glenda still dies and Bruce has no memory of ever loving her.
- Janifer St. Cyr: In Batman: Reign of Terror, Janifer is the wife of Captain Bruce Wayne, the revolutionary masked defender of Paris.

==== In other media ====
===== Film =====
Nicole Kidman as Dr. Chase Meridian in Batman Forever.

- Dr. Chase Meridian (Nicole Kidman): Appears only in Batman Forever as the female lead. Chase was created specifically for the film by screenwriters Janet and Lee Batchler, as they thought that would be more interesting to have Bruce Wayne date a psychoanalyst rather than plucking a typical socialite love interest from the comics. Akiva Goldsman attempted to make the character sexier in subsequent drafts. Kidman described the character as a "criminal psychologist who happens to have sort of the perfect blonde hair and the red lips and wear these sort of tight black dresses. So it's a dichotomy - you have the criminal psychologist who dresses like Jessica Rabbit". Rene Russo was originally cast by Tim Burton for this role whilst he was still the director of the film and when Michael Keaton was still set to play Batman. However, when Burton was fired as Director and rehired as Producer, Keaton quit in disgust. Joel Schumacher, whom Burton brought on board in his role as producer, decided to cast a younger Batman, eventually Val Kilmer and decided Russo was too old to play opposite a younger Batman. During recasting, Robin Wright turned down the role while Jeanne Tripplehorn and Linda Hamilton were also both considered. Chase is a psychologist working with the Gotham City police and falls in love with both Batman and Bruce Wayne. She assists Bruce in analyzing a series of befuddling threats sent to him by the Riddler and also witnesses the death of Robin's parents by Two-Face. Later, she learns that Bruce is Batman after he invites her and tells her how he found the cave, and is kidnapped by the Riddler and Two-Face in a trap designed to make Batman choose between her and Robin. In the Riddler's lair, she is chained to the sofa, struggling to escape, taunted by the Riddler before Batman arrives and then she says Batman will come for her, to which Riddler states that he is "counting on it". She and Robin are both placed in glass jars, bound and gagged, over a pit of water and metal spikes, with the Riddler able to release them at the touch of a button. He plans to determine whether Batman and Bruce Wayne can co-exist, will Batman save Bruce's love or the Dark Knight's partner. Batman saves them both after distracting the Riddler by giving him a riddle and breaking the device. Chase promises to keep his identity secret. She visits the Riddler after he screams in the asylum he knows Batman's identity, but when she asks him, he says "I am" and shows himself to have made bat-like wings from his clothes. Outside Arkham, Chase meets with Bruce and says that his secret is safe as they kiss. She then gets in a car with Alfred while Batman and Robin leave to patrol Gotham. Her name is a play on words; as a psychologist in love with Bruce Wayne / Batman, she is constantly "chasing" the psychological "middle" of her lover, seeking to reconcile his two halves into one complete lover. In an interview, Kidman commented that she enjoyed playing Meridian as a damsel in distress, as it gave her experience for similar roles in the future.
  - A version of Dr. Chase Meridian is introduced in the DC Comics' mainstream continuity during "The New 52". The character is visually reimagined as a dark-skinned, red-haired woman to avoid paying Nicole Kidman for likeness royalties. Meridian returns in the Infinite Frontier event "Shadows of the Bat" as a researcher at Arkham Tower under control of the Psycho-Pirate.
  - Chase Meridian appears in the Gotham Knights episode "More Money, More Problems", portrayed by Grace Junot.
- Rachel Dawes (Katie Holmes/Maggie Gyllenhaal): In Batman Begins, Bruce hopes to become romantically involved with his childhood friend, now an assistant district attorney. He saves her from an attack by a criminal sent to kill her to prevent her prosecuting. She tells him that she cannot be with him until the time Gotham no longer needs Batman. In The Dark Knight, Rachel is in a relationship with Harvey Dent. She is about to agree to marry Dent and writes a note to Bruce Wayne telling him of her choice, reflecting that, while she believes there might come a day when Gotham will no longer need Batman, she no longer believes there will be a time that "Bruce" will not need Batman. However, the mob kidnaps both Rachel and Harvey, resulting in Rachel's death in an explosion while Harvey is accidentally rescued by Batman, as the Joker lies by switching the addresses for Rachel and Harvey, and Harvey's transformation to Two-Face after part of his face is burnt. Alfred later burns the note so that Bruce will believe Rachel would have chosen him, reflecting that sometimes people need to believe that their faith will be rewarded, though in The Dark Knight Rises, which is set eight years later, Alfred reveals the truth to a still-grieving Bruce in an attempt to get him to move on from Batman, which he eventually does by the end of the film beginning a relationship with Selina Kyle. Rachel is said to be loosely based on Julie Madison.

===== Animation =====
- Andrea Beaumont (the Phantasm): In the animated film Batman: Mask of the Phantasm, most of the relationship between Bruce and Andrea is told through flashbacks. Andrea was a major factor during Bruce's struggle into becoming Batman. Bruce wanted to give up being Batman to be with her, but was ultimately forced not to after she and her father moved to Europe to avoid the Valestra mob. Later, she becomes the Phantasm to avenge the death of her father at the hands of the Valestra gang, primarily the member who killed her father and who would eventually become Batman's greatest enemy the Joker. She next appears in the comic book sequel to the film, where she helps Bruce one more time in stopping Arthur Reeves who was rendered insane by Joker's toxin and then returns in the comic book series Batman Adventures: Shadows and Masks where she tries to infiltrate Black Mask's organisation on the secret orders of the Red Hood (who would later have been revealed to be her supposedly deceased mother, Victoria had the storyline been resolved) and visits Bruce at Wayne Manor asking him not to interfere though he coldly rebukes her, calling her a killer and she later fights Batgirl. She would return decades later, following Bruce's retirement from crime fighting, being hired by the latter's former associate from his Justice League days Amanda Waller to help create a new Batman by murdering Terry McGinnis's parents. She initially agreed but backed down later on, angrily citing that doing so would dishonor all that Bruce stood for, although Terry still wound up becoming Batman. She later returns in the Batman Beyond comic book universe in "Mark of the Phantasm", where she is hired by Waller again to kill Jake Chill a.k.a Vigilante (the great-grandnephew of Joe Chill, who murdered Bruce's parents) the man who murdered Terry's father, Warren. She meets Bruce again and convinces him to tell Terry the truth. While Bruce admits that he had been searching for Andrea and tries convincing her that it is not too late for them, though she declines stating that she does things Batman is not willing to.
- Cheetah: In Justice League, Cheetah was a member in a group of villains formed by Lex Luthor that has captured Batman. She was left alone to watch Batman and she told him her origin, and how she sees herself as a freak. Batman told her that he sees a determined woman who's willing to lose everything for a cause she believes in; they then share a kiss. Batman was actually seducing her only to avoid the explosion of a bomb planted there by the villains, the bomb was exploded outside the station and for that Luthor accused her to be a traitor, showing to the rest of the group a tape of the holding cell with Cheetah and Batman kissing. Lex orders Solomon Grundy to take care of Cheetah and he dragged her out of the room.
- Susan Maguire: In The New Batman Adventures episode "Chemistry", Susan was first seen at Bruce's friend Veronica Vreeland's wedding. Bruce quickly fell for her and he proposed, even deciding to quit as Batman for her, despite scepticism from Dick Grayson. After the wedding, on the honeymoon cruise, Bruce realized that Susan was too perfect and it turned out she was a plant-hybrid created by Poison Ivy as part of a plan to kill him and other rich people and inherit their fortunes. When Susan attacked him he locked her in their room, and she most likely drowned after Ivy's ship sank.
- Margaret Sorrow (Magpie): In Beware the Batman, Magpie attacks a scientist and successfully wipes his memories, catching the attention of Batman. Magpie attempts to goad Batman, declaring that they're very much alike due to the dark design of their costumes. Eventually, she is subdued and arrested by Batman. Magpie is revealed to have developed a romantic obsession with Batman, due to Batman secretly visiting her at Blackgate. Unknown to her, Batman empathized with how Magpie never received the psychiatric help she needed. Upon seeing Katana at Batman's side, Magpie believes that the two are romantically involved and resolves to kill Katana, so she can have Batman all to herself. Magpie is angered when Batman rebuffs her advances but she is later defeated by the duo.
- Bethanie Ravencroft: In Beware the Batman, Bethanie was a psychologist who formerly experimented on rehabilitating criminals. Bruce Wayne became her patient, when he was trying to find information about a former patient of hers, Magpie, who abducted Bethanie but fortunately Batman saved her. Not being his psychologist anymore they began dating. She later lured Wayne into a trap by the League of Assassins and she was revealed to be in league with Silver Monkey. Lady Shiva drained her soul and imprisoned it within the Soultaker Sword, leaving her alive, but a husk.
- Ava Kirk: In Beware the Batman, a childhood friend of Bruce Wayne, Ava comes back to his life when an army of cloned super soldiers, the Manhunters, controlled by a mysterious organization called The council, try to abduct her to force her thought to be dead father, Paul Kirk, who was the original Manhunter, to return to The council, so they can create more clones. After saving her from the first attack, Bruce asks Ava to stay at his home for the night so she can be safe but later the Manhunters succeed into abducting her from the Wayne Manor. Batman, Katana and Paul save Ava and later Paul says goodbye to his daughter as he leaves to find and stop the rest of the members of The council. Paul asks Batman to take care of Ava and protect her while he will be away. Later, Ava says to Bruce that he kept his promise to her father of being there for her when she was in need and that she is happy they found each other again as she believes Bruce is a unique person. Ava and Bruce begin dating and in one of their dates while they are ready to dance a group of thugs breaks in the restaurant but they are saved by a new masked vigilante, Deathstroke. Later, Bruce as Batman, asks Ava's help to secretly treat a wounded Katana, in the clinic she is working in.
- Samantha Vanaver: In Batman vs. Robin, Samantha is a wealthy woman whose family, like the Waynes, had positions of influence in Gotham for hundreds of years. She dates Bruce Wayne and while they have dinner, Bruce shows to her his plans to make Gotham City a better place. After their dinner, Samantha meets Bruce's son, Damian. On the way to another date with Samantha, Bruce is attacked by white owl-masked people and brought before the Court of Owls, who offer Bruce a chance to join them as a member of one of Gotham's wealthiest families. Later, Talon is revealed to be in a relationship with Samantha, who is secretly the Grandmaster of the Court of Owls. Despite their social class divide, Samantha wants to spare Talon from the ritual of being killed and later be revived as an undead assassin, much like the other Talons. Together they plan to have Robin instead, take his place in the ritual to become the Court's new Talon, which is also part of their plan to destroy Batman, while he will stand by Samantha's side leading the Court. When Talon introduces Robin to the Court of Owls and Damian reveals himself to the Grandmaster, Samantha realizes that if Robin is Bruce's son, then Bruce must be Batman. Ordering Talon to kill Damian and promising they will find a replacement for the ritual, Talon instead turns against the Court of Owls, murdering every member, including Samantha. After he kills her, Talon says he was never one of them, and that Samantha would eventually have done the same to him.
- Barbara Gordon: In Batman: The Killing Joke, Batgirl has an unrequited crush on Batman that turns physical after a frustrated Batgirl initiates a minor altercation between the two (note that this is a mutually accepted interaction, as Batman reciprocates by kissing her back). It was also confirmed by Barbara herself in Batman Beyond that the two had briefly dated some time after Dick Grayson left Gotham following The New Batman Adventures (her attraction to him is evident in the film Mystery of the Batwoman, which Bruce is uncomfortable about and Alfred and Tim tease him about it), but the relationship ended badly and Barbara began holding a grudge towards him in the future because of this, it is later revealed in Batman Beyond 2.0 comics that Barbara was pregnant with Bruce's unborn child, until she had a miscarriage following a crime fighting related accident and when Dick found out the truth from Bruce, it worsened his already strained relationship with the latter and cut ties with his former mentor and Barbara as well, leading to her marrying Sam Young.

=== Dick Grayson's love interests ===
- Barbara Gordon (Batgirl/Oracle): When Barbara started her career as Batgirl working with Batman and Robin, she and Dick began to grow closer time by time and eventually they began a romantic relationship. This relationship became a longtime on-and-off relationship continued even after Barbara's retirement and even after she was paralyzed in The Killing Joke. The two grew closer after the events of "No Man's Land", and became engaged before Infinite Crisis, but they later broke it off when Dick left to help Batman rediscover himself, with Barbara telling him they were not ready for marriage. Both still show feelings towards each other, but are no longer together. Barbara reacted jealously when seeing Dick and Helena Bertinelli kiss, but later kept an eye on Dick while he recovered from Penguin's control and being shot by the new Black Mask (Jeremiah Arkham). In Convergence Nightwing and Oracle #2, Pre New 52 Dick Grayson and Barbara Gordon are married. Following the events of the "City of Bane" storyline, Dick and Barbara adopt a puppy together and shortly thereafter, the two restart their romance.
  - In the Earth 2 comics, Dick and Barbara are married with a son, Johnny, in Chicago. It is implied, however, that neither have any association with Batman.
- Koriand'r (Starfire): Dick Grayson's longest lasting relationship was with the alien princess Starfire. They dated for 12 years (or 5 years, in comics time). They were also engaged to be married, but their teammate Raven, who had turned evil, blew up the priest before he could announce them husband and wife. The relationship was already on unsteady ground, with Kory fearing Dick was rushing into marriage. They eventually broke up. They remained best friends with a few tense moments and kisses in between. It is clearly stated that they still have feelings for each other, but do not want to risk messing it up again.
  - In the alternative timeline of Kingdom Come, Grayson and Starfire have a daughter named Mar'i Grayson (Nightstar).
- Bette Kane (Bat-Girl/Flamebird/Hawkfire): Bette has appeared many times as a love interest for Dick Grayson both in comics and in other media. During the Silver Age when Dick was Robin and Bette was Bat-Girl, sidekick to her aunt Batwoman (Kathy Kane), Bette developed a crush on the Boy Wonder which he seemingly reciprocated.
- Alia (Agent 8): In the comic book Grayson, Dick has a one-night stand with fellow Spyral agent Alia.
- Bridget Clancy: Bridget Clancy was Dick Grayson's superintendent when he moved to Blüdhaven. The two of them shared a romantic interest, but it never developed into anything. She is Asian in appearance, but has an Irish accent.
- Cheyenne Freemont (Nightwing): Cheyenne was a famous fashion designer and at some time a model with an equally famous reputation for her romantic liaisons who first met Dick when they had a one-night stand together. The two formed a purely casual and sexual relationship with her with a "no strings attached" agreement for a while. The relationship did not last long due to Cheyenne wanting to start life for herself and to avoid the metahuman brothers tracking her. She is a closet metahuman who can discharge a mysterious blue energy from her hands.
- Daphne Pennyworth: Alfred's niece, Daphne is an actress and was used by the Old Avon Players to gain the trust of the residents of Wayne Manor and the affections of Dick Grayson to obtain an original copy of Romeo & Juliet in Wayne's possession.
- Deborah Poulos: A librarian working at the Museum of the City of New York, Dick meets Deborah while doing research as a museum curator. They have a healthy relationship that ends on friendly terms when Deborah decides to move to San Jose to get away from the violent events that had been occurring in New York.
- Emily Washburn: Emily was a young woman in Gotham City who in three years time had lost three husbands to freak accidents. Nightwing believed she was a black widow and decided to stop her from killing any more men. Thinking he could be her next target, he approached her in his civilian identity of Dick Grayson. The pair became close and Dick proposed. The two were wed in a fake ceremony that Dick staged. During their honeymoon in Hawaii, Dick and Emily ran into Emily's best friend Annelise. Annelise attempted to kill Dick but he was able to overpower her. It turned out that Annelise was attempting to punish Emily by killing any man she fell in love with. Dick learned that Emily's father had gotten Annelise's father arrested and she was trying to get revenge. After Annelise's arrest, Dick revealed his plan to Emily. She was upset that Dick deceived her but grateful that he had cleared her name. Dick then offered to make a life with Emily and her son but she declined stating that Dick had other secrets he could not share with her.
- Helena Bertinelli (Huntress): Dick and Helena had a one-night stand while out patrolling together, to solve the murder of an undercover cop. Dick wanted to start a serious relationship but Helena refused, since then the two have maintained a personal and professional friendship together. Helena reveals that she initially slept with Dick to get closer to learning some of the Batman Family's secrets, but had begun developing feelings for him. After Dick became Batman, the two kissed to blend in at a party while following Thomas Elliot (Hush), resulting in an awkward silence. In the New 52, Helena is considered to be dead in the public while she has been working as a spy in the secret organization known as Spyral. She recruits Dick in the organization too, after he also faked his death, and becomes his partner. During the time the two work together Helena often flirts with Dick, even though it is not permitted by Spyral for its members to become too involved with each other. In the Future's End tie-in issue of Grayson (which occurs five years later), the two are in a romantic relationship.
- Helena Wayne (Huntress): The daughter of Bruce Wayne in the Earth-Two parallel universe. She and Dick become partners after her father's death, with them sharing a seemingly platonic relationship. However, later, it is revealed that she has been secretly in love with him.
- Jesse Chambers (Jesse Quick): Introduced to the Titans team by Wally West, Dick and Jesse share several flirtations early on. When teased by Wally however, Dick states that there is nothing going on between him and Jesse. They do continue to work together, and Dick helps train her.
- Liu: One of Dick's earliest relationships was with a slightly older woman named Liu. The romance was cut short, when she destroyed him emotionally when he found out that she was just using him to get to Bruce.
- Kara Zor-El (Supergirl): Supergirl has been shown to have a strong one-sided crush on Dick, both as Nightwing and Batman, even going as far as kissing him out of surprise. Dick, however, seems to view their relationship more as platonic.
  - In Justice League of America (vol. 2) #52, a black kryptonite infected version of Kara, called Dark Supergirl, when confronted by Dick, as Batman, who tells her to choose a side between the Justice League or the Crime Syndicate, Kara responds by kissing him.
- Kate Spencer (Manhunter): In the backup story to Batman: Streets of Gotham, she flirts with, and agrees to go out on a date with Dick Grayson.
- Lori Elton: As a student at Hudson University, he had a relationship with fellow undergraduate Lori Elton, the daughter of a police chief. But when she saw his cold reaction to a classmate's murder, she stopped the tension.
- Rachel Roth (Raven): Dick shared a brief romance with his Teen Titans teammate Raven, going as far as kissing her passionately. It was revealed that Raven mistakenly believed she was in love with Nightwing and unintentionally used her powers to make him reciprocate. Their relationship ended after Starfire explained to Raven the difference between romantic and platonic love.
- Raya Vestri: Raya was a childhood friend to Dick, a trapeze artist at Haly's Circus as well as his first crush, the two began dating even though Raya at first wanted only a sexual relationship. Later, Raya allied with Saiko to kill Dick at a Haly Circus tribute to the Flying Graysons (Dick was present there for a memorial speech), but when she found out Saiko was trying to kill every member and audience of the circus, she betrayed him and turned herself over to the police. Later, the Joker freed Raya from her cell in Blackgate Penitentiary, poisoned her with Joker venom, and forced her to fight Nightwing. Dick injected her with the antidote and Raya died in Dick's arms, telling him she was sorry for everything she had done.
- Selina Kyle (Catwoman): In Nightwing (vol. 2) #52, Nightwing and Catwoman run into one another when Catwoman is attempting to steal a rare diamond. In the process, she kisses him, and flirtatiously suggests that they do not tell Batman. Nightwing deduces that she is trying to make Batman jealous, and has a laugh out of it.
- Shawn Tsang (Defacer): A former graffiti artist and supervillain in Gotham City, Shawn Tsang later relocated to Blüdhaven and became romantically involved with Dick Grayson in the DC Rebirth run of Nightwing.
- Sonia Zucco: Sonia is the estranged daughter of Tony Zucco, the mobster who murdered Dick Grayson's parents. Trying to step out of her father's shadow by being a legitimate businesswoman, she heads the GGM bank. She was personally involved in the process of approving a GGM loan to Dick Grayson and during their business discussions, Sonia and Dick began a relationship. However, this relationship was strained when Sonia revealed to Dick that her father is still alive. Eventually, Dick shows an interest to re-connecting with her, but is captured by the Crime Syndicate in Forever Evil.

==== In other media ====
- Pamela Isley (Poison Ivy): In the live-action film Batman & Robin, at a charity ball Poison Ivy unexpectedly appears to get the Heart of Isis diamond necklace. Blowing around a wisp of pheromone dust, she offers the auctioneers present a night with her. Batman and Robin, also hit by the pheromone dust, get in on the auctioning action themselves. Later on, Poison Ivy focuses on Robin, who is easily swayed by her charms. Batman tries to get Robin to come to his senses about what Poison Ivy is doing to the both of them, but Robin refuses to listen, believing that Batman is jealous and just wants Ivy for himself. Robin later shows up at Poison Ivy's hideout, where she lures him to her private plant-like throne to kiss her. When Ivy tells him of her and Mr. Freeze's plan, Robin realizes he has to stop them but Ivy gets him to kiss her before he takes off, assuming that he will die. Unfortunately, the kiss has no effect, as Robin wore a protective sheath on his lips. Then Batman shows up, ready to take Poison Ivy in.
- Zatanna Zatara: In the TV series Young Justice, Dick flirts with Zatanna when they go on a mission to rescue Red Tornado after she is introduced to the team. In a later episode Dick explains how he got a magical necklace from Zatanna without her asking questions saying "we have a history". The tie-in comic shows that they had dated, and broken up in the five-year time gap between the two seasons. However, they remain on friendly terms.
- Raquel Ervin (Rocket): In the tie-in comic for Young Justice, Raquel gives Dick a birthday kiss. Zatanna comments on how Dick manages to stay friends with all of his ex-girlfriends, implying that Raquel is one of them.
- Harleen Quinzel (Harley Quinn): In the animated film Batman and Harley Quinn, Nightwing tracks down Harley Quinn and finds her supposedly reformed and working at the restaurant Superbabes. After a brief fight, Nightwing is knocked out and tied to her bed, and the two are implied to have had sex off-screen.

=== Terry McGinnis' love interests ===
- Dana Tan: A student at Hamilton Hill High School, Dana was Terry McGinnis' girlfriend, and later fiancée.
- Melanie Walker (Ten): Melanie is the youngest member of the futuristic version of the Royal Flush Gang who has occasionally dated Terry McGinnis.
  - In the parallel Earth of the Justice Lords, Terry McGinnis is in a relationship with Melanie and they are both members of the Jokerz.
- Mareena/Marina (Aquagirl): Mareena was the only member of the Justice League who was friendly to Terry when he was first introduced to the team as, after they met, she invited him for a swim. The two are implied to have feelings for one another.
- Catwoman: A new Catwoman, not related to Selina Kyle, appears in the Batman Beyond comics. Her real name is not mentioned, but she reveals that she is the daughter of the villain Multiplex and inherited his self-duplication abilities.

=== Barbara Gordon's love interests ===
- Dick Grayson (Robin/Nightwing): When Barbara started her career as Batgirl working with Batman and Robin, she and Dick began to grow closer and often flirted. The two started a relationship after the events of "No Man's Land", and became engaged before Infinite Crisis, but they later broke it off when Dick left to help Batman rediscover himself, with Barbara telling him they were not ready for marriage. Following the events of the "City of Bane" storyline, Dick and Barbara adopt a puppy together and shortly thereafter, the two restart their romance.
- Jason Bard: Bard was a former GCPD detective who was force to retire after knee injury. He became a private investigator, and struck up a romance with Barbara. They were engaged to be married, however Barbara broke it off when she was shot and paralyzed by the Joker. She would later team up with Bard on cases as Oracle in the first Birds of Prey series.
- Ted Kord (Blue Beetle) In the first Birds of Prey series, the two flirted over instant messaging, not knowing who the other was. They met up on a date and quickly deduced the other's identity. After another date, they decided to just be friends. Black Canary later claimed Barbara "cyber did-it" with Blue Beetle, which Barbara denied.
- Charles Dante (Spellbinder): It was revealed in Batgirls #3 that Barbara had an ex who was now the supervillain Spellbinder, though Babs claimed they were "never official".
- Ethan Cobblepot (Blacksun): In an arc spanning from Batgirl (2015) #7-11, Ethan charmed Barbara into the date, and she then learned he was the son of the Penguin. Eventually, Ethan became the supervillain Blacksun and Barbara had to take him down as Batgirl.
- Luke Fox (Batwing): Luke Fox and Barbara Gordon had a short fling in Batgirl (2015) #44.
- Steven Harris: In a possible future presented in Batgirl: Future's End, Barbara marries a cop named Steven Harris. However, Barbara's brother James Gordon, Jr crashes the reception with a gun, and tells Steven to jump off the high building or he will harm Barbara. Barbara charges at James, certain she can take him down before he hurts her or Steven, but Steven jumps in the seconds before she gets there. Barbara is devastated and breaks ten of her brother's bones in a rage. After this, she quits being Batgirl, allowing Stephanie Brown, Cassandra Cain and Tiffany Fox to take over as the League of Batgirls. She reinvents herself as Bete Noir and mentors them.

In other media

- Sam Young: In the Batman Beyond animated series, Barbara is married to Gotham City district attorney Sam Young.

=== Kate Kane's love interests ===
- Renee Montoya (The Question): In Kate' Kane's debut appearance, it was revealed that former police officer Renee Montoya was her ex. Kate met Renee when the officer pulled her over for erratic driving, and the two struck up a romantic relationship but later broke up after an argument where Renee accused Kate of having no direction in life. The two of them would later frequently team up as Batwoman and the Question.
- Maggie Sawyer: Maggie Sawyer is a Metropolis police officer who first shows interest in Kate when she dances with her at a charity ball and asks for her number. She is Kate's love interest in the Batwoman Rebirth series and Kate eventually reveals her identity as Batwoman to her and proposes to her in costume.
- Sophie Moore: Sophie was Kate's roommate and girlfriend at Westpoint, but they had to keep their relationship a secret due to Don't Ask, Don't Tell. However, Kate was found out, and refused to lie about her sexual orientation, though she did not out Sophie. Kate resigned from the military, but Sophie stayed and eventually became a colonel. She got a teaching job at Gotham Military Academy and had a friendly, but slightly awkward, reunion with Kate at a carnival.
- Mallory Kimball: Doctor Mallory Kimball is Kate's former friend and lover. She first shows up in DC's 52 series.
- Safiyah Sohail: Safiyah was established as Kate's former lover in the Batwoman Rebirth series.
- Quinn Nash (Enigma): Kate and Quinn meet in the story "Riddler on the Roof" in the Twas the Mite Before Christmas Special. Kate is battling the Riddler, and decides to outsource riddle-solving to Quinn, a cryptography expert, and she takes her on a date. Quinn solves the riddles and they bond. At the end of the story, Batwoman learns Quinn is the Riddler's daughter, and Quinn's previous hero codename Enigma is referenced.
- Alya Raatko (Featherweight): In the story "Second Date" in Justice League: Dream Girls, Kate meets Alya at an LGBTQ Bar, and the two dance and part with a kiss later that night after agreeing to a second date. However, later when Kate tries to stop a woman destroying a construction site, she discovers that woman is Alya.

In alternate universes

- Selina Digatti (Catwoman): In the DC Bombshells universe, Kate and Selina flirt quite a bit. However, when Selina kisses Kate, Kate rejects her, as she's still dating Maggie Sawyer.

In other media

- Julia Pennyworth: In the Batwoman TV series, Julia is portrayed as Kate's former lover.

=== Jason Todd's love interests ===
- Rose Wilson (Ravager): In Red Hood and the Outlaws, part of the New 52 run of the DC Comics, Jason confirms that he and Rose had a one-time fling. In the 2018 Titans TV series, Rose appears in the second season, and has a romance with Jason for part of it. The two become romantically involved in DCeased: Unkillables before getting married prior to the events of DCeased: Dead Planet.
- Essence
- Isabel Ardila
- Artemis of Bana-Mighdall: Wonder Woman's fellow Amazon sister Artemis and Jason both became attracted to one another while he worked alongside her and other outlaws.
- Carmen Ortega

=== Tim Drake's love interests ===
- Ariana Dzerchenko: A Russian immigrant who moved to Gotham City with her family, making their home in the Little Odessa neighborhood. She met Tim when he rescued her father, who owned a printer shop, from a gang. A second attack on her father was successful and resulted in his death at the hands of KGBeast, and she moves in with her uncle Vari and aunt Natalie. Tim's relationship with Ariana is one aspect of his life that is normal for a teenager, but his secrecy and preoccupation frustrates her repeatedly. Ariana is forced to break up with Tim after her uncle finds them in a compromising position and transfers her to an all-girl school, but they later get back together. Tim becomes involved with Stephanie Brown during their relationship, and he decides to break up with Ariana to be with Stephanie, only for Ariana to break up with him first because she thinks they're too young for a serious relationship.
- Stephanie Brown (Spoiler/Robin/ Batgirl)): Stephanie adopts the moniker of Spoiler to capture her criminal father the Cluemaster, and she assists Batman and Robin in his arrest. When Stephanie and Tim team up to stop the Cluemaster a second time, she saves his life and he gives her a kiss in thanks, which sparks her romantic interest in him. After that, she regularly patrols the city with Robin, and they develop a mutual crush even though he is dating Ariana (which Stephanie does not know). They start dating after Tim breaks up with Ariana, but he doesn't reveal his real identity to her, causing tension between them. Batman ultimately reveals Tim's real identity to Stephanie, which upsets Tim, who storms out on them when he finds out. Regardless, they continue dating until Stephanie fakes her death at the end of Batman: War Games. Later, when they're Red Robin and Batgirl, Tim tries to restart their relationship, but Stephanie rejects him because he wasn't good for her. During Batgirl: Convergence, the pre-"Flashpoint" versions of Tim and Stephanie get back together. During Rebirth and Infinite Frontier, the two officially re-enter a relationship, but Tim eventually breaks it off while trying to figure out his sexuality. In the film Batman Beyond: Return of the Joker (2000), the producers believe the older Tim Drake's blonde wife to be Stephanie.
- Cassie Sandsmark (Wonder Girl)): Tim and Cassie briefly enter a relationship in the wake of Superboy's death, as they are both mutually grieving him, but they break it off later. In the Titans Tomorrow alternate future storyline, in an attempt to alter Batman's memories, Cassie kisses Tim, though it enrages Conner. Cassie and Tim are in a relationship eight years later. In the animated series Young Justice, Tim and Cassie form a relationship at the end of the second season, after Wally West's death gave Cassie the courage to kiss him and after Tim leaves the team at the beginning of the third season by joining Batman Inc., Cassie tries to patch things with him.
- M'gann Morzz (Miss Martian): In the Titans Tomorrow alternate future comic, Tim although he is in a relationship with Cassie also has an affair with M'gann while they are colluding with Lex Luthor.
- Zoanne Wilkins: Zoanne was Tim's classmate and girlfriend. Their relationship was a little rocky, as Zoanne once got mad at Tim for falling asleep on a roller coaster. Tim starts becoming more withdrawn and obsessed as a hero, and breaks up with Zoanne in Robin (1993) #183
- Bernard Dowd: In Batman: Urban Legends, Tim (as Robin) rescued his friend Bernard from kidnappers, and Bernard, not realizing Tim and Robin are one and the same, confides to Robin that Tim helped him come out. This causes Tim to realize he himself is bisexual, and later he and Bernard enter a relationship.
- Jubilation Lee (Jubilee): In the DC vs Marvel (aka Marvel vs DC) comic crossover series Tim Drake is paired against Marvel's Jubilee from the X-Men to fight one another. They have instant chemistry and reluctantly fight each other to save their respective universes, but not before sharing a kiss. After the fight, where Drake won without hitting Jubilee the couple begin their relationship in Venice. In the following Amalgam series the two are combined into one person to become Sparrow, Dark Claw's (an amalgamation of Batman and Wolverine) sidekick. Then in the All Access series that followed, the two are reunited where Jubilee wants to continue as a long distance relationship across universes but they realize the impossibility of it and Drake is already dating someone else. They then finish with a goodbye kiss. Since the DC/Marvel universes has not crossed over again the relationship has never been rekindled and the characters have evolved substantially in their current timelines.
- Tam Fox: In the Red Robin comic, Tim and Tam are involved in a relationship after her father sends her on a quest to find him and after being attacked by multiple assassins she falls deeply in love with Tim.

In other media

- Barbara Gordon (Oracle): In the Batman: Arkham series, Tim and Barbara are shown to care deeply for one another as seen in Arkham City and Arkham Knight, the latter game in which Tim is shown to be very distressed after Barbara is kidnapped by Scarecrow. The two eventually get married at the conclusion of the game, presumably sometime after Batman's apparent death.

=== Cassandra Cain's love interests ===
- Kon-El/Conner Kent (Superboy): The two heroes kissed in Batgirl (2000) #39, and went on a date. However, Cassandra realized she was just lonely rather than really in love, and they broke it off, deciding to be friends instead.
- Tai'Darshan (Black Wind): Tai'Darshan, a metahuman who could control tornadoes, was part of a faction fighting against the Tarakstan government. Cassandra met him in Batgirl #39 and heavily disapproved of his methods (which included killing) but the two had romantic tension regardless, to the point it made Batman angry with the boy. Tai'Darshan eventually sacrificed himself.
- Zero: Zero was a boy who was a love interest for Cass from Batgirl #63-#66. He had a concerning habit of stalking Cass, but the two nevertheless enjoyed a dance together at a rave, and before Cass left on the journey to find her mother, she took Zero on a date and kissed him. Zero was killed alongside many others when a nuclear bomb dropped on Bludhaven.

In alternate universes:

- Erik: In the Shadow of the Batgirl YA graphic novel, Cassandra has a romance with Erik, a young man she meets at the library. Erik is an athlete who likes romance novels and poetry, and the two of them form a book club together that helps Cass progress with her reading. They grow closer and Cassandra has her first kiss with him.

=== Stephanie Brown's love interests ===
- Tim Drake (Robin/Red Robin): Stephanie adopts the moniker of Spoiler to capture her criminal father the Cluemaster, and successfully arrests him with the aid of Batman and Robin. When Stephanie and Tim team up to stop the Cluemaster a second time, she saves his life and he kisses her in thanks, which sparks her romantic interest. After that, she regularly patrols the city with Robin, and they develop a mutual crush even though he is dating Ariana (which Stephanie does not know). They start dating after Tim breaks up with Ariana, but he doesn't reveal his real identity to her, causing tension between them. Batman ultimately reveals Tim's real identity to Stephanie, which upsets Tim. Regardless, they continue dating until Stephanie fakes her death at the end of Batman: War Games. Later, when they're Red Robin and Batgirl, Tim tries to restart their relationship, but Stephanie rejects him because it isn't good for her right now. During DC's Rebirth era they re-enter a relationship, but later break up again.
- Dean: Dean is Stephanie's ex-boyfriend and the father of her child. Dean is shown on a date with Stephanie in Batman: Huntress/Spoiler: Blunt Trauma, and when the earthquake happens, Stephanie tackles him out of the way of falling rubble. When Stephanie expresses that she wants to stay and help people, Dean dismissively asks her if she thinks she's some kind of hero, and abandons her. Later, Stephanie realizes she is pregnant and Dean is the father. When asked if she told him, she states that she couldn't get in touch after he abandoned her, and she doesn't think he would care. She's proven correct in Robin #80. Dean comes to see her, and when Steph confirms the baby was his and she gave the baby up for adoption, Dean shows no interest and instead says there's no reason they can't get back together now. Stephanie very forcefully rejects him.
- Kyle Mizugochi: Stephanie develops a crush on Kyle in the Batgirls (2022) series, and the two go out on a date. Stephanie claims it was platonic, but nobody believes her, and she continues to have a crush.

In other media

- Harper Row: In the Gotham Knights TV series, Stephanie is lesbian and enters a relationship with Harper, who is bisexual.
- Luke Fox: In the Batwoman TV Series Stephanie aided Luke in finding her father, and kisses him goodbye. They later go on a date, though Stephanie gets frustrated with Luke and leaves early.

=== Damian Wayne's love interests ===
- Nika (Flatline): In the 2021-2022 DC comic series Robin, Damian meets Flatline while attending the Lazarus Tournament. While the two characters start off with a competitive relationship, they grow closer over the course of the tournament. This budding relationship culminates into a kiss in Issue #11.

In other media

- Rachel Roth/Raven: In the DC Animated Movie Universe films Justice League vs. Teen Titans, Teen Titans: The Judas Contract, and Justice League Dark: Apokolips War, the two form a romantic bond. In the comic books, they are separated by a large age gap, with Raven being roughly Dick Grayson's age.

=== Duke Thomas's love interests ===
- Tiffany Bender: In the We Are Robin series, Duke has to fight his ex-girlfriend Tiffany's brother after Tiffany sees Duke hanging out with Donna Sanders. Duke explains to Tiffany they're just friends, but Tiffany doesn't believe him. Later, Tiffany's brother murders their parents.When Duke tries to check up on her after the murder, he discovers she's now saying with her grandparents in Metropolis.
- Isabela "Izzy" Ortiz (Robin): Izzy was a fellow Robin with Duke during the "We Are Robin" movement, and the two became closer and started dating. Izzy still works with Duke as Signal as seen in the Batman & The Signal, being his main support operative while he's in the field.
- Claire Clover (Gotham Girl): Duke and Claire are presented as married in a potential future presented in Batman #5 (2016), but haven't been in a relationship otherwise.

In alternate universes:

- Ana: In the Wayne Family Adventures webtoon, Duke develops feelings for his classmate, Ana, and goes on a date with her. Ana later breaks up with him because she feels the relationship isn't working.

== Supporting characters ==
- Joe Chill: The mugger who killed Bruce's parents.
- Carrie Kelley: Debuted as Robin in The Dark Knight Returns, entered the main DC Universe in 2013 in Batman and Robin as Damian Wayne's acting instructor.
- Robin (Matt McGinnis): Terry McGinnis' younger brother and Bruce Wayne's other biological son. Featured in the animated TV series Batman Beyond and its comics versions. In the comics, Matt eventually learns that Bruce was Batman and under his personal tutelage became the next Robin.
- Aunt Harriet Cooper, the maternal aunt of Dick Grayson, who appeared in the Batman comics and TV series in the 1960s.
- Henri Ducard: A French detective, Ducard is one of Wayne's few teachers who has had a continuing presence in the comics such as "The Man Who Falls" and Blind Justice, having taught a young Bruce Wayne the art of the manhunt. Ducard's moral ambiguity led to future conflicts with Batman. In the movie Batman Begins, Ducard appears as Wayne's mentor in crime fighting, but it later turns out that he was actually Ra's al Ghul in disguise. In The New 52 series Batman and Robin, he trains his son Morgan in the art of assassinating under the name "NoBody".
- Dr. Thomas Elliot: A surgeon introduced in the Hush storyline, Thomas Elliot is a childhood friend of the Wayne family. Elliot and Wayne parted ways at a young age, after the death of Elliot's father. Dr. Elliot is later revealed to be secretly insane since childhood and leading a double life as the criminal mastermind Hush.
- Legs: A homeless Vietnam veteran and resident of the streets of Gotham City. The character was frequently featured in cameo appearances in various Batman comics during the 1980s and 1990s. The character has not been utilized in published material since the late 1990s and has fallen into obscurity.
- Professor Carter Nichols: A hypnotist who developed a form of "time travel hypnosis" that led into many time travel adventures for Batman, Robin and even Superman in the 1940s and 1950s.
- Daphne Pennyworth: The niece of Alfred Pennyworth and daughter of Wilfred Pennyworth, briefly appeared in the late 1960s/early 1970s.
- Lady Shiva: One of the most feared assassins in the world, Shiva has often been a foe of Batman. However, after Batman broke his back fighting Bane, he went to Shiva for training.
- Bronze Tiger trained under Batman's ninja master Kirigi and was a member of the Sensei's League of Assassins (albeit brainwashed), at one point teaching Cassandra Cain. Tiger would best Batman in a battle during his mission, leading members of the League to slay Kathy Kane. Thanks to Amanda Waller, he would be freed of the Sensei's programming and would return as an ally to Batman.
- Dr. Leslie Thompkins: A lifelong friend of Thomas Wayne and Bruce's godmother. She is a strict pacifist and used to run a rehabilitation clinic for criminals and drug addicts. She had a temporary falling-out with the Dark Knight after Stephanie Brown's apparent death.
- Alice Chilton: Bruce Wayne's nanny after the loss of his parents. She was Joe Chill's mother, a fact only Alfred was aware of.
- Slam Bradley: A private detective that largely operates out of Gotham, Bradley became good friends with Catwoman. Bradley's son, called Slam Bradley Jr., is a cop in Gotham and the father of Catwoman's daughter.
- Vigilante (Dorian Chase): Brother of Adrian Chase and a murderous crimefighter that first troubled Nightwing and proved to be a formidable fighter before crossing swords with Batman.
- Lock-Up: Initially an overzealous vigilante, Lock-Up would be tolerated during the events of No Man's Land as he controlled Blackgate Prison. However, he was seen acting alongside villains during Infinite Crisis.
- Sarah Essen (aka Sarah Essen Gordon) is in most continuities the wife or love interest of Police Commissioner James Gordon. She is Gordon's former partner and later takes up the mantle as the Commissioner after Jim is demoted by Mayor Armand Krol. She was first seen in Batman #405. Essen Gordon first appeared in Batman #405 and was created by Frank Miller and David Mazzucchelli's Batman Year One.

=== Trainers of Bruce Wayne ===
The following have trained Bruce Wayne in his path to becoming Batman:

- Kirigi: Batman's instructor in ninjutsu who would also train several members of the League of Assassins.
- David Cain: World-renowned assassin who trained Bruce Wayne.
- Tsunemoto: An assassin for the yakuza who trained Bruce Wayne.
- Chu Chin Li: A master of kung fu who trained Bruce Wayne.
- Fatman: The imitator of Batman who helped him and became a hero.

=== Wayne family ===
This section lists the ancestors and relatives of Bruce Wayne:

- Abigail Wayne - Wife of Benjamin Wayne, mother of Wilhemina Wayne.
- Agatha Wayne - The aunt of Bruce Wayne.
- Alan Wayne - The son of Solomon Wayne and the great-great-grandfather of Bruce Wayne. Alan Wayne was the founder of Wayne Shipping. In The New 52, Alan Wayne was one of the victims of the Court of Owls.
- Benjamin Wayne - son of Silas II, husband of Abigail Wayne and father of Wilhemina Wayne.
- Bruce N Wayne - Youngest son of Silas II, a private investigator, and first cousin once removed to Bruce Wayne who was named after him.
- C. L. Wayne - Gave money to the Gotham Botanical Gardens In 1870.
- Caleb Wayne - Lead wagon trails though Native American territory.
- Catherine van Derm - The wife of Alan Wayne and the great-great-grandmother of Bruce Wayne. She died giving birth to Kenneth Wayne.
- Celestine Wayne- She was the Daughter of Zebediah Wayne. She was promised to the eldest son of the Elliot Family but was raped by Caleb Dumas. her brother Jonathan killed Caleb and the Waynes ran the Dumas out of Gotham in retaliation. She then died an old maid never marrying or having children.
- Charles Wayne - The son of Darius Wayne. Died at 52 of tuberculosis and left everything to his three sons Solomon, Joshua and Zebediah Wayne.
- Constance Wayne - The wife of Richard Wayne and the mother of Helen Wayne. Had a very cold relationship with her husband.
- Contarf Wayne - Lord of Waynemoor castle during the early 1600s.
- Damian Wayne - Son of Bruce Wayne and Tali al-Ghul also known as Robin.
- Darius Wayne - An ancestor of Bruce Wayne and the fictional brother of Anthony Wayne who fought in the American Revolutionary War. He was the architect behind Wayne Manor.
- Dorothea Wayne - The wife of Solomon Wayne and the great-great-great-grandmother of Bruce Wayne.
- Edmond Wayne - In 1685 he battled and killed the serial killer Lafayette Arkham. He is an ancestor of Bruce Wayne. He was the first Wayne to live in Gotham.
- Elwood Wayne - He was the brother of Silas II and Patrick Wayne. He died an old man and divide up his share of the family fortune between surviving members.
- Emelyn Wayne- A priest that lives in Asia and the oldest son of Silas II.
- Harold of Waynemoor - He was one of the architects of Waynemoor castles in Scotland and was murdered by his own brother Lorin.
- Helen Wayne - The youngest child of Richard and Constance Wayne. She was kidnapped in 1961 at two months old and was killed.
- Henry Wayne - Worked closely with his cousin Alan Wayne in building Wayne Tower in the heart of Gotham. He had one son Jack Wayne.
- Herkimer Wayne - A Major-General During the war of 1812.
- Horatio Wayne - General during the Revolutionary War.
- Ismael Wayne - A great whaling captain.
- Jack Wayne - The son of Henry Wayne. He fought in World War I and was a big part of Gotham in the 1930s.
- Jane Wayne - Daughter of Philip Wayne. She was married and had a son named Junior.
- Jeremy Wayne - A member of the Wayne family that lives in Australia. Unknown his relation to Bruce Wayne.
- Jonah Wayne - Helped protect Gotham From the Great Depression. He married Mildred Wayne and had one son Richard Wayne.
- Jonathan Wayne - He was the son of Zebediah Wayne and the brother of Celestine Wayne. He had one son Tiberius K. Wayne.
- Joshua Wayne - The brother of Solomon and Zebediah Wayne, the uncle of Alan Wayne, and the great-great-great-uncle of Bruce Wayne. He died freeing a group of slaves on the underground railroad.
- Kenneth Wayne - The son of Alan Wayne, father of Elwood, Silas II, Patrick Wayne and the great-grandfather of Bruce Wayne. He also created Wayne Chemicals.
- Laura Wayne - The wife of Kenneth Wayne. Lead Wayne Enterprises after Kenneth's death while raising her three sons.
- Lorin of Waynemoor - He was one of the architects of Waynemoor castles. He also murdered his own brother Harold. Lorin is also an ancestor of Bruce Wayne.
- Martha Wayne - The mother of Bruce Wayne. She was killed by Joe Chill during a mugging.
- Mildred Wayne - She was the wife of Jonah Wayne and the mother of Richard Wayne.
- Mordecai Wayne - A Puritan ancestor of Bruce Wayne whose portrait hangs in Wayne Manor. He was also the brother to Nathaniel Wayne.
- Nathaniel Wayne - He was an ancestor of Bruce Wayne from the first generation of the Wayne family. Under the alias of Brother Malleus, Nathaniel was the leader of Gotham's people who hunted and killed witches. It was because of this that the Wayne family was cursed upon him burning a supposed witch named Annie.
- Patrick Wayne - The son of Kenneth and Laura Wayne. He is the father of Thomas, Agatha, and Phillip Wayne as well as the Grandfather of Bruce Wayne.
- Philip Wayne - The uncle of Bruce Wayne and the brother of Thomas Wayne. He would raise Bruce for a while after the loss of his parents. In "The New 52", Philip is the brother of Martha Wayne. He later gave his life to protect Batman from Red Hood I during their fight at Ace Chemicals.
- Preston Wayne - He founded Wayne Motors. He had one son Jonah Wayne.
- Richard Wayne - He was the son of Jonah and Mildred Wayne, the husband of Constance Wayne and the father of Helen Wayne. He had a very cold relationship with his wife.
- Silas Wayne - A silversmith who is an ancestor of Bruce Wayne from 1787. He was used by Henry to take the blame for Henry's highwayman activities since Silas loved Henry's sister Martha as a way to protect Martha's mother. Benjamin Franklin gives Silas Wayne a letter which proves his innocence to be used after Martha's mother dies. However, Silas dies first. Bruce later finds the letter hidden inside Silas Wayne's portrait and Silas is finally cleared one hundred years later.
- Silas Wayne II - Older brother to Elwood and Patrick Wayne. Father of Emelyn, Benjamin and Bruce N. Wayne. He was against his great-nephew Bruce Wayne's Playboy antics. On his death bed, Bruce revealed that he was Batman and Silas died happy knowing Bruce was a true Wayne.
- Sir Gaweyen de Weyne - A member of the family who was of French descent. Died fighting in the Crusades. He is an ancestor of Bruce Wayne.
- Solomon Wayne - The father of Alan Wayne, the brother of Joshua and Zebediah Wayne, the husband of Dorothea Wayne, and the great-great-great-grandfather of Bruce Wayne. During the 19th century, he worked as a judge in Gotham City. He died at the age of 104.
- Thomas Wayne - The father of Bruce Wayne. He was killed by Joe Chill during a mugging.
- Thomas Wayne, Jr. - Bruce Wayne's older brother. It has been said Thomas suffered brain injuries in infancy and was relegated to a life of care. However, one story tells of him being left catatonic after the death of their parents and institutionalized. The brothers' uncle had told Bruce his brother had, in fact, died. Thomas would recover and choose to live a reclusive existence as an acrobat in a traveling circus. However, he would be brainwashed into becoming an assassin. The hero Deadman learned of this and decided to take over his life. Batman would later learn these facts and try to reclaim his brother. While Thomas was free of Deadman, he gave his life to save Batman by diving in front of a hail of bullets from his criminal companions.
- Vanderveer Wayne Sr. - Son of Philip Wayne, and first cousin of Bruce Wayne. Unlike his cousin, he did not have a good relationship with his father. As a result of that he spoiled his son Vanderveer Jr.
- Vanderveer "Van" Wayne Jr. - The spoiled rich cousin of Bruce Wayne.
- Winslow Wayne- Fought alongside Theodore Roosevelt in the rough riders.
- Wilhemina Wayne - The orphan daughter of Benjamin and Abigail Wayne, making her Bruce Wayne's second cousin. She currently lives in South Africa.

=== Kane family ===
This is the family that Martha Wayne is from, making them relatives of Batman. With the exception of Martha Wayne (nee Kane), most of the Kane family was introduced or developed in the 2000s as supporting characters of Batwoman.

- Jacob Kane - The father of Kate Kane, brother of Martha Wayne, and uncle of Bruce Wayne and Bette Kane.
- Beth Kane - The twin sister of Kate Kane. After being presumed dead, she resurfaces years later as the villainous Alice.
- Catherine Hamilton (appeared in Batwoman, portrayed by Elizabeth Anweis) - The second wife of Jacob Kane and stepmother of Kate Kane who is the heir to the Hamilton Rifle Company arms fortune.
- Gabrielle "Gabi" Kane - The wife of Jacob Kane and mother of Kate and Beth. She was killed by terrorists.
- Cameron Kane - The ancestor of Kate Kane who is an industrialist.
- Robert Kane - The ancestor of Kate Kane and the son of Cameron Kane. He died protecting his father from an attack by Nicholas Gate. Following Robert's death, Cameron named a bridge he developed after him called the Robert H. Kane Memorial Bridge.
- Roderick Kane - The father of Martha Wayne and Jacob Kane and the grandfather of Kate Kane and Bruce Wayne. After he had had a stroke, Roderick was confined to an iron lung and could not speak well.

=== Supporting characters in other media ===
- Detective Ethan Bennett (appeared in The Batman, voiced by Steve Harris) - A GCPD detective who, unlike Chief Angel Rojas and Detective Ellen Yin, supports Batman's motives and is Bruce Wayne's best friend. He appeared in the majority of season one. At the end of the first season, he becomes Clayface after being exposed to the Joker's "Joker Putty". He attempts to kill both Chief Rojas and the Joker, but is stopped and defeated by the efforts of Batman and Detective Yin. He reappeared in the season two episode "Meltdown", where he attempts to reform, but he fails and goes on a crime spree as Clayface. He is defeated again by Batman. In "Grundy's Night", he impersonated Solomon Grundy to get revenge on Batman, but fails. In his final appearance, "Clayfaces", he breaks out of prison and he helps Batman and Robin battle another Clayface, Basil Karlo. In the end, he and Karlo are cured, and Bennett tries again to restore his image.
- Detective Ellen Yin (appeared in The Batman, voiced by Ming-Na Wen) - Yin is a new transfer to the GCPD since she left Metropolis. During the first season, she opposed Batman as a vigilante and tries to capture and unmask him. After she helps Batman fight Clayface at the first season's finale, she grudgingly accepts Batman as a vigilante and goes from being his enemy to his ally. Her final appearance was in the season two finale.
- Chief Angel Rojas (appeared in The Batman, voiced by Edward James Olmos in his first appearance, Jesse Corti in other appearances) - Chief Rojas is the head of the GCPD and does things by the book. Unlike Detective Bennett, who sees Batman as a hero, Rojas distrusts Batman and sees him as a potential threat to all of Gotham. While he did fire Ellen after she was caught talking with Batman, he gave Ellen her badge back on Commissioner Gordon's orders.
- Chief Miles Clancy O'Hara (appeared in the 1966 Batman TV series and film, portrayed by Stafford Repp) - Commissioner Gordon's right-hand man. As a foil to highlight Batman's brilliant deductions, he is often presented as dim-witted, but good-intentioned. A female version of the character appears in The Lego Batman Movie, voiced by Lauren White.
- Alexander Knox (appeared in Batman, portrayed by Robert Wuhl) - A reporter for the Gotham Globe. In the film, he works with Vicki Vale to investigate Batman's actions. When Vicki becomes suspicious of Bruce's actions, she asked Knox to show footage of the alley where Bruce's parents were killed. During the climax, Knox is nearly killed after being exposed to the Joker's gas. At the end of the film, he recovers from his injuries. In the early scripts of the film, Knox was set to die in the parade, but the producers convinced Tim Burton not to kill Knox. His name is a reference to Alexander Knox. Alexander Knox later appeared in Crisis on Infinite Earths Pt. 1 reprised by Robert Wuhl. He was seen reading the newspaper when he witnesses the sky turning read as he hopes that Batman is looking to the sky.
- Lieutenant Maxwell "Max" Eckhardt (appeared in Batman, portrayed by William Hootkins) A corrupt police officer who works for crime boss Carl Grissom and criminal Jack Napier (who will later become the Joker in the film). He is later betrayed and killed by Napier before Napier becomes the Joker.
- Fred Stickley (appeared in Batman Forever, portrayed by Ed Begley Jr.) - Edward Nygma's ill-tempered supervisor at Wayne Enterprises. At the beginning of the film, he terminated Edward Nygma's invention when he feared it would cause Wayne Enterprises to go bankrupt. When he learned about Nygma's true intention of the invention, Nygma killed him in retaliation and used computer forgery to make it look like Stickley killed himself.
- Dr. Lee (appeared in Batman Forever and Batman & Robin, portrayed by Michael Paul Chan) - A research scientist at Wayne Enterprises. He made a cameo appearance in Forever, where he comforted Edward Nygma. He had a more important role in the sequel, where he and another research scientist were kidnapped by Mr. Freeze. They were rescued by the efforts of Batman, Robin, and Batgirl.
- Dr. Penelope "Penny" Young (appeared in Batman: Arkham Asylum, voiced by Cree Summer) - An Arkham Asylum employee who aids Batman in stopping Joker from taking over the institute. Shortly before the events of the game, Young performed experiments on Bane to create a drug known as Titan, a much more powerful version of the drug Venom that is designed for the Asylum's patients to survive gruesome therapies. During the events of Arkham Asylum, after saving Dr. Young from the Joker's goons and defeating Bane, Batman deduces that the Joker planned the assault on Arkham for months and that Young knew that Joker was using her research to create an army of super soldiers; her denial had forced the Joker to return to the Asylum. Fighting off the Scarecrow's fear toxin, Batman destroys the remainder of Young's Titan formula, but as Dr. Young arrives to the Warden'a office to recover the rest of the formula in a safe, she was held captive by serial killer Victor Zsasz. Batman manages to save her from Zsasz. As she attempts to recover the formula from the safe, she discovers it is booby-trapped, and an explosion occurs, killing Young.
- Proto-Bot is a prototype Bat-Bot introduced in Batman: The Brave and the Bold.
- Special Agent Iman Avesta (appeared in Batman: The Enemy Within, voiced by Emily O'Brien) - Avesta is an employee of Amanda Waller, a field agent of the Agency and a Gotham native. She serves as an aide to Batman when she was selected to help find and dismantle a criminal organization called the Pact. Avesta joins other Agency operatives in an attempt to capture the Riddler, wanting to impress Batman, but is captured by the Riddler and held in a death trap that renders her deaf. Avesta later begins using hearing aids to restore her lost hearing. It is later revealed that she already knew his true identity of Bruce Wayne, and had passed this information to Waller.

== Characters from alternate continuities ==
Several characters featured outside of modern Batman canon are of note:

- Batman (Terry McGinnis) is the lead character in the animated series Batman Beyond, who initially took up the Batman mantle to avenge his father Warren's death at the hands of Derek Powers. The Justice League Unlimited episode "Epilogue" reveals that Terry is Bruce's biological son, with Amanda Waller having given Warren his reproductive DNA as part of Project Batman Beyond, to create a replacement for Bruce after his inevitable retirement. Batman Beyond. In 2011, Terry was incorporated into the main DC Comics continuity.
- Batman (Tlano) is an alien who brought Batman to his world Zur-En-Arrh to help him become his planet's hero and to battle robot invaders piloted by an unnamed alien race.
- Harvey Harris: Harvey Harris was a detective from Gotham City (Earth-One continuity). He trained young Bruce Wayne in the art of criminal detection and provided the young boy with his first costumed identity - Robin. Harris is good in combat, claims to have a black belt and uses a gun.
- Carrie Kelley (Robin/Catgirl): Carrie Kelly became the first female Robin (chronologically, though not canonically) in 1986's Batman: The Dark Knight Returns. In the sequel series Batman: The Dark Knight Strikes Again, Carrie is called Catgirl, as an homage to Catwoman. In The Dark Knight III: The Master Race, she became Batwoman. In 2013, Carrie was incorporated into the main DC Comics continuity.
- Huntress (Helena Wayne): Pre-Crisis, the Huntress was Helena Wayne, daughter to Earth-Two's Bruce Wayne and Selina Kyle (Catwoman). In 2011, Helena was incorporated into the main DC Comics continuity.
- Blackwing (Charlie Bullock) was a lawyer who become a hero patterned after Batman (after the hero's death) on Earth-Two. He would team with that Earth's Huntress.

== See also ==
- List of Green Arrow supporting characters
- List of Superman supporting characters
- List of Wonder Woman supporting characters
- List of Green Lantern supporting characters
- List of Aquaman supporting characters
