= Batman/Poison Ivy: Cast Shadows =

Publication information
- Publisher: DC Comics
- Format: One-shot
- Genre: Superhero
- Publication date: April 2004
- No. of issues: 1
- Main character(s): Batman; Poison Ivy

Creative team
- Written by: Ann Nocenti
- Artist: John Van Fleet
- Letterer: Todd Klein
- Colorist: John Van Fleet
- Editor(s): Joey Cavalieri, Harvey Richards

Batman/Poison Ivy: Cast Shadows is a 2004 DC Comics one-shot graphic novel featuring the characters Batman and Poison Ivy written by Ann Nocenti and illustrated by John Van Fleet. Cast Shadows follows a mysterious killer, who seems to be carrying out a series of Ivy-like murders. Batman, investigating, discovers they are somehow linked to a new tower that has been blocking out the sunlight to Poison Ivy's cell in Arkham Asylum, as he and Ivy work together to take the killer down. The story also depicts the romantic potential between Batman and Ivy.

== Plot ==
Poison Ivy is tending to her windowsill garden in Arkham Asylum where she has created a plant that converts sunlight into renewable energy, thus creating a limitless source of clean electricity. The plant soon dies when industrialist Dan Trimbel's construction of Gotham Tower blocks out the light, much to her grief. At a therapy session with her assigned psychiatrist, Dr. Wood, Ivy is seen spitting out her anti-psychotic pills. He and Ivy discuss her poisoned lips, and Ivy tells him that any man who loves her must be insane or have a death wish. Meanwhile, Batman captures a deranged billionaire art collector, and takes him to Arkham. Dr. Wood invites him to speak to Ivy, who has been working on various plant creations to benefit society as part of her rehabilitation.

Learning that the collector was poisoned, Ivy offers to help Batman; after giving her flesh-colored prosthetic makeup so she can appear human, the pair take the man to a hospital. There are other victims, including an office clerk who worked in the mailroom of a skyscraper. It becomes clear that all of them have been poisoned in the same manner. However, Batman then notices flowers growing from the mail worker's corpse. He also finds that in the commotion, Ivy has kissed the other victims, instantly curing them. Ivy takes the opportunity to escape, and Batman takes a sample from a patient and retreats to the Batcave.

There, he finds a flower posted to Bruce Wayne, thanking him for investing in Gotham Tower. His butler, Alfred Pennyworth, notes that Batman has been poisoned by the flowers. Batman tells Alfred he must kiss Poison Ivy for the cure, and that if he fails Alfred must kill him. Batman chases Ivy to the Gotham Tower, where she has Trimbel tied up with her vines. Ivy and Batman confront each other, where Ivy says that Dr. Wood is responsible for the poisonings after becoming obsessed with Ivy. Ivy went along with it because she did it for everyone who has no light - everyone who lives in grey office cubicles and dark apartments and black prison cells. Batman warns Ivy that he'll have to knock her out to kiss her so he can be sure that she doesn't kill him when he passes out after being cured. Ivy insists that he trust her.

Batman at first decides to punch her, hesitates, then they embrace and kiss passionately instead. Upon being cured, he falls, but saves himself, and saves Ivy as Gotham Tower collapses when — assuming Batman dead — Poison Ivy tries to kill herself, once more insinuating that it is more than just lust she feels for him. Ivy and Batman share a moment together speaking, watching her plant creations create light, and Batman compliments her on her talent. Ivy then agrees to cure Trimbel so long as he agrees to stop building Gotham Tower, and he goes into a deep sleep after accepting this exchange.

In the final scene Batman takes Ivy back to Arkham Asylum, so that Ivy can finish her rehabilitation. Discouraged, Ivy complains to Batman about the lack of light in her cell, and Batman responds that there is nothing he can do about it, before departing. Ivy is welcomed back by the other patients on that ward. Meanwhile, on the way out Batman pays a visit to Dr. Wood, revealed to now himself be a patient at the asylum for his insanity. Transferred to a new cell the next morning, Ivy is stunned when she discovers that someone has had her room moved to a special cell where she can be in the sunlight and has been filled with flowers as a gift. Upon being told some "anonymous benefactor" wanted to make sure her time isn't as daunting as it might have been, a touched Ivy smiles and thanks Batman.

== Reception ==
Ray Tate for Comics Bulletin was positive to the novel, calling its story "original", and noted that John Van Fleet's unique artwork "work[s] beautifully together" with the story.
