= Batman: War Crimes =

2005 comic book crossover storyline

"War Crimes"
- Cover of Batman: War Crimes (2005), trade paperback collected edition; art by James Jean.
- Publisher: DC Comics
- Publication date: August 2005
- Genre: Superhero; Crossover
- Title(s): Batman #643-644; Detective Comics #809-810
- Main character(s): Batman; Black Mask; Cluemaster; Joker; Leslie Thompkins

Creative team
- Writer(s): Bill Willingham, Andersen Gabrych
- Artist(s): Pete Woods, Giuseppe Camuncoli, Jock

"War Crimes" is a comic book crossover storyline published by the comic book publishing company DC Comics. The event ran during the month of August 2005 in the Batman and Detective Comics series, and is the sequel to another Batman crossover, War Games. While originally released by itself in trade paperback format, the later trade paperback release in 2016 would have this event as part of Batman: War Games Vol. 2.

== Plot summary ==
In the wake of Gotham City's recent brutal gang war, Black Mask controls the criminal underworld. Batman patrols the streets alone, as Robin (Tim Drake), Batgirl (Cassandra Cain), and Oracle (Barbara Gordon) have all left Gotham in the wake of the death and destruction and his own culpability in the chaos. The police, under Commissioner Akins, hunt him.

In Bludhaven, Tim and Cassandra train, fight crime, and attempt to deal with the death of Stephanie Brown. They are shocked to hear Stephanie's name publicly proclaimed on television as one of Batman's allies. The source of the story is Aaron Black, who reveals in the televised interview that Stephanie was not only Spoiler, but also Robin, and that she could have survived her vicious torture at Black Mask's hands if given proper medical care.

From this information, Batman knows that someone who knows his true identity as Bruce Wayne is leaking information, and follows up with Dr. Leslie Thompkins, the physician who treated Stephanie before her death. Leslie has resigned, and Stephanie's file is missing. Following the trail, Batman finds the doctor who checked out the file murdered and the crime scene arranged to frame him, as well as the incomplete file. After removing the false evidence, Batman follows up with Aaron Black, only to find Black under attack from an imposter dressed as Batman and the Joker. Driving off the imposter and knocking out the Joker, Batman tells Black to run, then follows the imposter, who reveals himself as Black Mask and manages to escape.

Bruce continues scrutinizing Leslie's clinic, confirming that treatment appeared to have been withheld from Stephanie Brown, though the treatment was logged. Aaron Black goes to the press, claiming that Batman tried to kill him and the police are corrupted by the Black Mask. Batman follows some investigative threads, then goes to the city's war memorial to lay flowers under Stephanie's photograph. Pulling on the threads leads Batman to Aaron Black, who turns out to be Arthur Brown, the Cluemaster, Stephanie's father. Arthur has been trying to get justice for his daughter, but tells Batman that his estranged wife, Crystal Brown, knows about Stephanie's death as well. On television, Crystal is struggling to decide what to tell the media when the Black Mask appears dressed as Batman and attempts to murder her. The real Batman appears to rescue her, but she destroys the Black Mask's records of Stephanie's death, telling Batman that the truth won't change the fact that Stephanie is dead.

On the run, Black Mask runs into the Joker, who attempts to kill him, claiming that the Mask stole the Joker's favorite job, killing Robin. Batman captures them both and gives them to the police. In a few days, Joker goes to Arkham, but Black Mask escapes in a bloodbath. The Cluemaster is indicted as well, and Batman heads to Africa to confront Stephanie's real killer, Leslie Thompkins. She tells Bruce that she withheld treatment to end Batman's endless crusade that keeps killing children. Brandishing a pistol, she tells Bruce she has given her fortune to Stephanie's daughter (placed for adoption at birth), and asks Bruce to kill her. He refuses, but cuts all ties with her and tells her that she will go to prison if she ever returns to America.

== Reading order ==
- Batman Villains Secret Files and Origins 2005
- Batman Allies Secret Files and Origins 2005
- Detective Comics #809
- Batman #643
- Detective Comics #810
- Batman #644

== Aftermath ==
Leslie Thompkins becoming a murderer created fan outcry at the out of character villainy of a longtime Batman ally. Andersen Gabrych, one of the writers of War Games and the co-writer with Bill Willingham of War Crimes, claimed that "War Crimes was always as much a part of the plan as War Games, itself...From the get-go, we knew we wanted to tell this story a year after, giving Batman, and (most importantly) the readers, a little distance from the huge upheavals of 'War Games' before we dropped the next couple of bombs".

Stephanie's death at the hands of Thompkins was retconned in 2008 by writer Chuck Dixon, as the doctor faked Stephanie's death with a body of an overdosed victim who shared a similar physical characteristics with her. After months in Africa recuperating, Stephanie returned to her identity as the Spoiler. Batman reveals to Tim that he had doubts about her death, which is why there was never a memorial of her in the Batcave, and implying that Batman begins doubting at some points after his confrontation with Thompkins and thus did not alert the authorities.
