= Bad Seeds (comics) =

American comic book crossover storyline

- Publisher: DC Comics
- Publication date: August – November 2026
Title(s)
See below
- Main characters: Batman; Poison Ivy; Vandal Savage; Nightwing; Barbara Gordon; Catwoman; Batgirl

Creative team
- Writer(s): Matt Fraction; G. Willow Wilson
- Artists: Giuseppe Camuncoli; Jorge Jiminez
- Penciller: Giuseppe Camuncoli
- Inker: Jorge Jiminez
- Letterer: Hassan Otsmane-Elhaou
- Colorist: Tomeu Morey
- Editor: Paul Kaminski

Batman: Bad Seeds is an American comic book crossover storyline published by DC Comics as part of the DC All In initiative. The storyline is primarily written by Matt Fraction and G. Willow Wilson, with art primarily by Jorge Jiminez, Giuseppe Camuncoli. The story consists of Batman and his Bat Family trying to stop Vandal Savage and Poison Ivy's war with each other. The event was received to critical acclaim from critics who praised the action, art, and writing from Matt Fraction, Tom Taylor, and Wilson.

== Publication history ==
In May 2026, DC Comics announced the Bad Seeds event, where Poison Ivy unleashes a desperate act of eco-terror that transforms Gotham into a hostile landscape of prehistoric plant life. The main Batman and Poison Ivy comics act as the main storyline, with tie-in issues being published in Detective Comics, Batgirl, Batwoman, Catwoman, Nightwing, and Harley Quinn for ten weeks.

== Plot ==
=== Lead-up ===
Vandal Savage's recent conflict with Batman and Catwoman has forced him to stay in Gotham City to retain his immortality. While in Gotham, Savage becomes Gotham City's police commissioner with the aide of the Court of Owls. Poison Ivy decides to run for mayor with the aide of Harley Quinn due to Savage's corrupt actions in the police force. As mayor, Poison Ivy allows Savage to use Gotham City's police to attack the Bat-family, resulting in Barbara Gordon being imprisoned. While working, Poison Ivy's relationship with Harley Quinn deteriorates, leaving her in an emotional spiral.

=== Main plot ===
Vandal Savage demands Poison Ivy stand down as mayor, which she refuses to do and, feeling betrayed by her allies, decides to give Gotham City to the Parliament of Trees in exchange for immunity for the murder of Bog Venus (Note: As depicted in Poison Ivy #38 (November 2025).) and protection from Savage. Gotham starts to become covered in plants, plunging the city into darkness and forcing Batman to call Duke Thomas, Tim Drake, Damian Wayne, Batwoman, Cassandra Cain, Stephanie Brown, and Nightwing to help him protect the people. Killer Croc saves Batman from a plant monster and tells him that Ivy plans to create a superbloom which will increase her powers and cover Earth in plants, while Savage has created a chemical compound to kill her. Batman heads to GCPD where he battles a group of corrupt policemen and emerges victorious, and confrons Vandal Savage for his action. Vandal Savage threatens to release all the herbicide over Gotham City by using airships, and Verity Pennyworth (Alfred Pennyworth's niece) tells Batman the herbicide is poisnous to everyone. Batman quickly dispatches Vandal Savage and disables all the herbicides with the help of an officer name Hall and decides to go to Mister Freeze for help.

== Reading order ==
Prelude

- Poison Ivy #45-47

Main Series

- **Batman: Bad Seeds - Sunset #1**
- **Batman #13**
- Batgirl #23
- Batman: Bad Seeds - Gotham Central #1
- Batwoman #7
- **Detective Comics #1113**
- Catwoman #91
- Nightwing #142
- Harley Quinn #66
- **Poison Ivy #48**
- **Batman #14**
- Batgirl #24
- Batman: Bad Seeds - Streets of Gotham #1
- Batman: Bad Seeds - Gotham Central #2
- Batwoman #8
- Catwoman #92
- **Detective Comics #1114**
- Nightwing #143
- Harley Quinn #67
- **Poison Ivy #49**
- Batman: Bad Seeds - Gotham General #1
- **Batman: Bad Seeds - Sunrise #1**
- Batman: Bad Seeds - Gotham General #2

Note: Core issues depicted in bold.

== Reception ==
According to ComicbookRoundup, the entire event received an average rating of 8.3 out of 10 based on 151 reviews.
