= Harper Row =

DC Comics character

Bluebird
- Harper Row as depicted in Batman vol. 2 #28 (April 2014). Art by Dustin Nguyen.

Publication information
- Publisher: DC Comics
- First appearance: As an unnamed woman: Batman (vol. 2) #1 (September 2011); As Harper Row: Batman (vol. 2) #7 (March 2012); As Bluebird: Batman (vol. 2) #28 (February 2014)
- Created by: Scott Snyder; Greg Capullo

In-story information
- Alter ego: Harper Row
- Species: Human
- Team affiliations: Batman Family
- Partnerships: Batman; Tim Drake; Spoiler; Cassandra Cain; Jason Todd
- Abilities: Skilled martial artist and hand-to-hand combatant; Genius-level intellect; Utilizing high-tech equipment and weapons; Expert detective; Expert athlete, acrobat, and marksman; Master strategist and tactician; Skilled computer hacker; Proficient inventor and engineer

Bluebird (Harper Row) is a fictional character appearing in American comic books published by DC Comics, primarily in association with Batman. Harper Row was created by writer Scott Snyder and artist Greg Capullo, first appearing in Batman (vol. 2) #7 (March 2012), before debuting as Bluebird in Batman #28 (February 2014). Harper Row's Bluebird identity was designed by artist Dustin Nguyen. Within the fictional DC Universe, Harper Row officially joins Batman's group of allies during the events of Batman Eternal, a year-long weekly maxiseries.

Instead of taking on the mantle of Robin, which is traditionally that of Batman's sidekick, Harper Row instead adopts an entirely new superhero identity, Bluebird. Her appearance marked the arrival of the first new "Bat-family" character in Batman comics since DC relaunched its entire line in 2011 as part of its The New 52 publishing event.

Fallon Smythe portrays Harper Row in Gotham Knights.

== Publication history ==
Harper Row first appeared as an unnamed cameo in Batman (vol. 1) #7 (September 2011). She later made her first full appearance in Batman (vol. 1) #7 (March 2012), where it is noted that she and Batman have met before. Their previous encounter was detailed in Batman #12 (Oct. 2012), illustrated by Becky Cloonan; this issue marked the first time a female artist has worked on the Batman title. Harper Row next appeared in Detective Comics (vol. 2) #21 (August 2013), the first time a writer other than Snyder had written her.

In Batman (vol. 2) #28 (April 2014), a sneak peek into the future of Batman Eternal, Harper Row made her debut as Batman's new sidekick Bluebird.

Scott Snyder reportedly based Bluebird on a design created by the daughter of prominent cosplayer Kyrax2. "Harper & Row" was also the name of the major American publishing firm Harper from 1962 to 1990.

== Fictional character biography ==
In early issues featuring Harper Row, she is introduced as a streetwise young woman from the Narrows, one of the roughest neighborhoods in Batman's locale of Gotham City. She and her brother Cullen Row are also revealed to be from a broken family with a deceased mother named Miranda and a deadbeat father named Marcus who would later end up in jail. Row makes her first appearance stealing food from a Wayne charity gala. Her life changes when she saves her brother Cullen from being gay-bashed: after Harper uses a taser on a group of bullies who butchered Cullen's hair with scissors, the two are rescued by Batman, who frightens and defeats the tormentors.

Batman's intervention leaves a lasting impression on the young woman. In addition to shaving her own head in solidarity with her brother, Harper begins trying to learn more about Batman to assist him in his fight against crime in Gotham. She manages to discover the devices Batman uses to disable the city's security cameras, and improves them with technology of her own design. Her efforts only earn the Batman's ire; even saving his life by pulling his unconscious body out of Gotham Bay and restarting his heart, using only jumper cables and a car battery, fails to win him over. At one point, Batman rewards Harper's attempts to help him by breaking her nose. The next day, Harper visits Bruce Wayne at Wayne Tower and shows him plans that she thinks will help Batman. To her surprise, Bruce agrees. That night, Batman tracks Harper down and apologizes to her. She tells him she may not know the details, but she knows he's going through a lot of pain (unbeknownst to her, the death of Damian Wayne). She also reminds Batman what he means to the city with a personal story about her mother. The issue concludes with Harper's message to Batman broadcast on Wayne Tower, a single word taught to Harper by her mother before her death: "RESOLVE".

In Batman Eternal, Harper stows away on board Tim Drake's plane and, over the course of the series, gains his trust. In issue #41, she suits up as Bluebird for the first time to rescue her brother Cullen; Red Robin and his allies Batgirl and Red Hood are caught up in a trap, leaving it up to her. Despite setbacks in her relationship with Batman himself, a near-future flash forward shows that Row eventually manages to overcome Batman's reservations and joins him in fighting crime as Bluebird.

During Batman & Robin Eternal, it is revealed that Harper's mother was murdered by Cassandra Cain, who was at the time an agent of "Mother", a villain who manipulates traumatized children on the grounds that she will make them stronger through trauma. Cassandra had been sent to kill both of Harper's parents and only killed Miranda, finding herself unable to murder Marcus as well. Mother planned to "offer" Harper to Batman as the perfect Robin; Batman had made contact with her to try and expose her long-term agenda and believed that he was meant to kill the parents of the new Robin Mother had chosen for him, when instead he was sent after two of Mother's other disciples as a test of his loyalty while Harper's parents were attacked in Gotham. Despite recognizing Harper's qualities would make her an ideal partner, at the time Batman simply forced her surviving father to take responsibility for his role as a parent as he did not want to benefit from Mother's plan, never revealing the truth to Harper even after she began working with him as Bluebird.

Mother attempts to win Harper to her point of view by arguing that her own family fell apart so that she had to rise up on her own, offering to let Harper kill Cassandra Cain after revealing that Cassandra was the one who killed her mother, but Harper rejects that idea, proclaiming that she grew up because her mother supported and recognized her desire for a better life rather than trying to make Harper be what her mother believed would work. Following Mother's defeat, Harper assures the returned Batman that she understands his reasons for not telling her about his history with Mother and his indirect role in her mother's death, but recent events have prompted her to go to college to receive official qualifications for her electrician skills and explore a life outside of the vigilante role. Batman assures her as she leaves that Bluebird will always be welcome in Gotham if she decides to suit up again.

In 2016, DC Comics implemented another relaunch of its books called "DC Rebirth", which restored its continuity to a form much as it was prior to "The New 52". Harper is a supporting character in James Tynion IV's run on Detective Comics, where she works as a medical volunteer at Leslie Thompkins' clinic, and is a friend of Cassandra Cain (Orphan) and Stephanie Brown (Spoiler). She also accompanies Batwoman, Spoiler, Orphan and Batwing to investigate the Victim Syndicate.

During the "Joker War" storyline, Harper takes on the mantle of Bluebird once again as Joker's new sidekick Punchline begins influencing Gotham's youngsters, including her brother Cullen.

== Other versions ==
In DC Comics Bombshells, an alternate history version of World War II, Harper Row is a teenage auto mechanic who works at a garage with Kathy Duquesne and Nell Little. She is shown to be a massive fan of Batwoman. During Batwoman's absence in Gotham, Harper along with Kathy and Nell form a team of Batgirls to protect the city. The Batgirls, joined by Alysia Yeoh and Bette Kane get into the Pinkey Orphanage to save Harper's brother, Cullen, and the rest of the orphans, who have been used to work on robots for the devious plans of Headmistress Webb. They later welcome Tim Drake, Cullen Row, and Felicity Smoak into the team, and create a Bat family.

== In other media ==
=== Television ===
- Harper Row appears in Young Justice, voiced by Zehra Fazal. Introduced in the third season, this version is a rebellious, teenage loner and classmate of Halo and Forager who regularly suffers abuse from her alcoholic father alongside her brother Cullen until Miss Martian eventually takes them to child protective services. As of the fourth season, the Rows were adopted by Snapper and Bethany Carr. Harper and Halo later become a couple in the fourth season finale.
- Harper Row appears in Gotham Knights, portrayed by Fallon Smythe. This version is a friend of Duela Dent and ally of the titular group who is initially a rival of Stephanie Brown before they later enter a romantic relationship.

=== Video games ===
Harper Row / Bluebird was originally set to appear as a playable character in Injustice 2, but was cut for unknown reasons.
