= Poison Ivy (2022 comic book) =

American comic book series (2022-present)

- Cover to Poison Ivy #1, art by Jessica Fong

Publication information
- Publisher: DC Comics
- Schedule: Monthly
- Format: Ongoing
- Publication date: June 7, 2022 – present
- No. of issues: 47
- Main character(s): Poison Ivy; Harley Quinn; Floronic Man

Creative team
- Written by: G. Willow Wilson
- Artist: Marcio Takara
- Letterer: Hassan Otsmane-Elhaou
- Colorist: Arif Prianto

Poison Ivy is an ongoing American comic book written by G. Willow Wilson and drawn primarily by Marcio Takara. The series centers on the DC Comics supervillain Poison Ivy who, following the events of the "Fear State" crossover, finds herself depowered and dying. Before she dies, Ivy sets out to complete one final mission to save the Earth by destroying the human race.

Originally intended as a miniseries, Poison Ivy was later expanded into an ongoing series by DC Comics. The first issue was published by DC Comics on June 7, 2022, with subsequent issues published monthly.

== Background ==
Poison Ivy is a DC Comics character who was first introduced as a botanical enemy of Batman in 1966. Wilson encountered Poison Ivy for the first time in the film Batman & Robin (1997), where the character was played by Uma Thurman. Another well-known portrayal of Ivy from the same era was in Batman: The Animated Series (1992–1995), where she was voiced by Diane Pershing. A significant aspect of the viridescent villainess has been her relationship with the costumed villain Harley Quinn, originally introduced in BTAS (Season 1 Episode 7, "Joker's Favor"). They first appeared together on that show in "Harley & Ivy" (Season 1 Episode 47). With the HBO Max adaptation Harley Quinn (2019–present), they have evolved from being partners in crime to lovers.

A miniseries starring Poison Ivy was announced by DC Comics in March 2022 as part of the publisher's "Pride Month" initiative. Poison Ivy was originally intended to be a six-issue miniseries written by Wilson with art by Marcio Takara, coloring by Arif Prianto, and lettering by Hassan Otsmane-Elhaou. Wilson described her new comic-book miniseries as primarily a love story whose titular character "has her own identity, her own story arc, and her own individual relationships with other people in the Bat-verse completely independent of Batman and the Bat-family." Other DC characters such as Killer Croc, Solomon Grundy, Swamp Thing, and some members of the Bat-family do appear in this series. In August 2022, DC Comics announced that the miniseries would be extended by an additional six issues, with Atagun Ilhan joining Takara in illustrating the second arc. In February 2023, DC Comics announced that the miniseries would be further expanded into an ongoing series.

The first issue was published by DC Comics on June 7, 2022, with subsequent issues published monthly.

From August to October 2026, Poison Ivy and Batman comprised the main story of the Bad Seeds event, during which a desperate Ivy makes a deal with the Parliament of Trees to return Gotham to a hostile landscape of prehistoric plant life. The event was primarily written by Wilson and Batman writer Matt Fraction, but also featured tie-in issues in other Batman-adjacent series.

== Synopsis ==
The miniseries takes place after the events of the DC Comics "Fear State" crossover storyline. Poison Ivy finds herself severely depowered and dying. Before she dies, she sets out to complete one final mission to save the Earth by spreading deadly fungal spores that will end humanity once and for all.

== Themes ==
Body horror and environmentalism are two of the key themes of this series; indeed, the line between mere activism and terrorism is blurry. As portrayed by Wilson, Poison Ivy is an anti-hero or anti-villain primarily motivated her anger, her own sense of justice, her loss of direction, and her unwavering desire to protect the natural environment from man-made destruction, and the climate change crisis is at the forefront of the story. Wilson was particularly interested in exploring the juxtaposition between Ivy's noble goal to save the Earth and the "questionable-to-evil" lengths she will go to achieve it.

Wilson also described Poison Ivy as a "love story from the perspective of a villain." It features Ivy and Harley's relationship prominently, with most of the miniseries being told in the form of letters that Ivy writes to Harley. According to the writer, the miniseries depicts "plant-based body horror" which was new territory for her.

Issues 19 to 21 constitute a revamped origin of the titular character, from her roots as a shy but determined graduate student in biochemistry to her metamorphosis into a supervillain.

== Critical reception ==
G. Willow Wilson stated in an interview that while she had planned for a "graceful" end to her run, positive reviews and strong sales led to its continuation. According to review aggregator Comic Book Roundup, the first issue scored an average of 8.9/10 based on 15 reviews, while the ongoing series as a whole averaged 8.2/10 based on 242 reviews as of June 26, 2025. On book cataloguing site Goodreads, the first collected edition, The Virtuous Cycle, received an average rating of 4.28/5 after 2,411 votes and 345 reviews, as of June 26, 2025.

Reviewing the first issue, Bleeding Cool's James Hepplewhite wrote that it was a promising start, while ComicBook.com's Nicole Drum thought it was "very close to perfect" but did not like how Ivy and Harley's relationship was portrayed. In their reviews of the second issue, both Drum and AIPT Comics' David Brooke praised the complex and humanized version of Ivy presented by Wilson. However, Brooke found that some of the supporting characters were written as idealized caricatures, which in turn made Ivy come off as somewhat heartless in her willingness to kill them. Scott Cederlund of From Cover to Cover praised the first collected edition, The Virtuous Cycle, for its multifaceted and sympathetic portrayal of Poison Ivy, whose thoughts were shared with the reader by love letters to Harley Quinn. Lizzie Hill of The Comic Circus argued the nuanced telling of the story of Poison Ivy on Poison Ivy Vol. 1 has cinematic potential.

Alex Schlesinger of AIPT Comics complemented Wilson for giving Poison Ivy agency in order to tell her own story in her own words instead of relying on a potentially unreliable narrator such as Arkham Asylum inspector Stuart or Bella Garten, but critiques the story for missing the opportunity to explore Ivy's relationship with Batman. On the other hand, Liz Wyatt of ComicBook.com praised Wilson for telling the story of the Viridescent Villainess without heavily involving the Dark Knight. Wyatt also appreciated Wilson's unique depiction of Poison Ivy as a morally ambiguous and complex character willing to acknowledge her past mistakes.

The series won the GLAAD Media Award for Outstanding Comic Book at the 35th GLAAD Media Awards.

== Collected editions ==
Title	Release date	Collected issues	ISBN
Trade Paperbacks
Poison Ivy Vol. 1: The Virtuous Cycle	May 23, 2023	Poison Ivy #1–6, Batman Secret Files: The Gardener #1, and material from Batman (vol. 3) #124 and Gotham City Villains Anniversary Giant #1	978-1779518491
Poison Ivy Vol. 2: Unethical Consumption	November 21, 2023	Poison Ivy #7–12	978-1779523303
Poison Ivy Vol. 3: Mourning Sickness	September 24, 2024	Poison Ivy #13–18	978-1779529411
Poison Ivy Vol. 4: Origin Of Species	December 3, 2024	Poison Ivy #19–24	978-1779529442
Poison Ivy Vol. 5: Human Botany	July 8, 2025	Poison Ivy #25–30	978-1799502050
Poison Ivy Vol. 6: A Death in Marshview	January 13, 2026	Poison Ivy #31–37	978-1799502579
Poison Ivy Vol. 7: Amuse-bouche	July 14, 2026	Poison Ivy #38–41, Poison Ivy Annual #1, Poison Ivy/Swamp Thing: Feral Trees #1	978-1799508687
Poison Ivy Vol. 8: Grassroots Monarcy	January 12, 2027	Poison Ivy #42-47	978-1799510178
Deluxe Hardcovers
Poison Ivy: Deluxe Edition Vol. 1	October 13, 2026	Poison Ivy #1–12, material from Batman (vol. 3) #124 and Gotham City Villains Anniversary Giant #1	978-1799509219

== See also ==
- Poison Ivy: Cycle of Life and Death (2016)
- Harley & Ivy Meet Betty & Veronica (2017–18)
- Harley Quinn (ongoing comic book series)
- Gotham City Sirens (2009–11)
- Ophiocordyceps genus of fungi
- Psilocybin
- Ecofeminism
