= Batman: The 12¢ Adventure =

October 2004 comic

Cover of Batman: The 12¢ Adventure one-shot.

Batman: The 12¢ Adventure is a one-shot comic written by Devin Grayson and illustrated by Ramon Bachs with a cover date of October 2004. It is a prelude to the Batman: War Games storyline that ran in 2004 and 2005.

== Synopsis ==
The issue is told predominately from the perspective of Spoiler, and much of the writing is her internal monologue.

All of Gotham City's crime bosses come together with a single bodyguard each for a meeting that had been called through an anonymous letter. Spoiler and Catwoman observe them when the nervousness of the crime bosses causes them to begin firing at each other, creating a bloodbath. While this occurs, Batman is at a public gathering as Bruce Wayne when Kobra terrorists break in. He manages to get most people to safety and enter his Batman costume, however upon stopping the terrorists he receives a cryptic message about how the terrorists knew Batman would underestimate Kobra.

Spoiler faces her immediate predecessor as Robin, Tim Drake, and he is furious at her knowing his secret identity. Catwoman shows up and is surprised when she sees Spoiler there to "cover the situation". Spoiler admits to being fired and Catwoman encourages her to call in Batman when the nervousness of the crime bosses causes them to begin firing at each other, creating a bloodbath.

Catwoman tells Spoiler to call Batman, but Spoiler is already running away from the situation. Spoiler is grateful nobody was there to witness her failure and she accepts the fact that Batman fired her. She believes it was for the better and it was right of him to do so. She cannot help him in any way.

== Criticism and reviews ==
One critic from "Comics Nexus" was "completely underwhelmed" because of the lack of history the 12 cent comic gives of each character. The critic describes it as not having enough background for a prelude to the incredible War Games series.

== See also ==
- List of Batman comics
