= Fear State =

Comic book storyline

- Publisher: DC Comics
- Publication date: August – December 2021
- Genre: Superhero
Title(s)
Batman (vol. 3) #112-117
Nightwing (vol. 4) #80
- Main character(s): Batman; Scarecrow; Dick Grayson; Barbara Gordon; Tim Drake; Cassandra Cain; Stephanie Brown; Harley Quinn; Poison Ivy; Catwoman; Simon Saint; Miracle Molly; Peacekeeper-01; Gardener; Seer; Kate Kane; Duke Thomas; Jace Fox; Ghost-Maker

Creative team
- Writer: James Tynion IV
- Artist(s): Jorge Jimenez, Ricardo Federici
- Penciller: Greg Capullo
- Inker: Danny Miki
- Letterer: Steve Wands
- Colorist: FCO Plascencia
- Editor: Mark Doyle

"Fear State" is a comic book crossover storyline published by the comic book publishing company DC Comics in late 2021, featuring Batman and his family. Primarily written by James Tynion IV, the arc is his second and final major arc on Batman in DC Rebirth. The main story was from Batman (vol. 3) #112–117, also including multiple tie-in issues.

The story involves Scarecrow wanting to control Gotham City using fear, and Mayor Christopher Nakano's mission to protect the city with his ground-breaking deal with the Magistrate (similar to an alternate future in "Future State"). This story introduces new characters Miracle Molly and Ghost-Maker and debuts Jace Fox as Batman. The crossover event received positive reviews from critics, with critics praising the action, art, and tie-ins, but the main story received criticism for its sluggish pacing.

== Publication history ==
In May 2021, DC Comics announced "Fear State" to bridge the gap between "Future State" and "Infinite Frontier". In this story, the new Gotham City Mayor Christopher Nakano has made a deal with the devil to enact a draconian anti-vigilante law enforcement agenda with a shadowy organization known as The Magistrate. This story also features the introduction of Jace Fox as the Next Batman.

== Plot ==
=== Prologue ===
After the events of Dark Nights: Death Metal, Wonder Woman meets up with the Quintessence (Ganthet, Hera, Highfather, Phantom Stranger, The Spectre, The Wizard) for an open position. While observing, she sees Bane killed by Joker toxin, and Barbara Gordon being Oracle again due to her spine implant while letting Cassandra Cain, Huntress, and Stephanie Brown take her role as Batgirl. A police officer name Sean Mahoney is gravely injured after saving a couple of nurses, Grifter needs Jace Fox (the brother of Batwing)'s help and it is revealed that there is a new villain name Simon Saint who is working with Scarecrow to negotiate with the new Gotham City Mayor Christopher Nakano.

Batman, Ghost-maker, and Harley Quinn take down criminals who are a part of a group called the Unsanity Collective but it results in collateral damage. Simon Saint meets up with the Mayor Nakano to advertise him The Magistrate (Peacekeepers who will stop crime before it happens as seen in "Future State"). After a few days, Scarecrow was presumed dead in the Arkham attack and Gotham City citizens become afraid due to multiple events that have happened in this city. Barbara Gordon tells him that the Unsanity Criminals have a leader name Master Wyze who wants to reboot Gotham City to get rid of their trauma and create a better future. Batman decides to meet up with the leader of the Unsanity by using a disguise.

During a ceremony to honor Sean Mahoney's heroics, Oracle spots Scarecrow. Meanwhile, Batman meets up with Miracle Molly, the leader of the Unsanity Collective, where she tells Batman she believes that the current society is a broken system and wants a society where people can help each other using technology, revealing that everyone in the Collective had their memory wiped. Miracle Molly reveals she knows that she's talking to Batman, and tells him that Simon Saint was the one who hired Unsanity to attack. Simon Saint convinces Sean Mahoney to be part of the Magistrate after showing his assistant Ricardo has cybernetic augmentation to compensate his missing limbs. Ghostmaker and Harley Quinn bond while sparring when they are interrupted by Bella Garten, a roommate of Poison Ivy who wants to know where Poison Ivy is. Batman confronts Simon Saint but he is attacked by Peacekeeper-01 (Sean Mahoney in a cybernetic body).

Mayor Nakano finally agrees to leak the idea of the Magistrate to the public, and communications are down so Oracle calls in the rest of the Bat-Family to help. While fighting, Mahoney reveals that Gotham City is afraid because everyone knows about the Multiverse and the evil versions of superheroes, as well as people disliking how Batman continuously partners with Catwoman and Harley Quinn. Batman successfully escapes Mahoney and is saved by Harley and Ghostmaker. Harley reveals that Mahoney was an abusive Arkham guard who needs to be stopped, and Peacekeeper finds Miracle Molly. Batman, Harley Quinn and Ghostmaker save Miracle Molly, with Batman putting a tracking device on Peacekeeper-01's armor realizing he's heading toward Arkham Asylum. Mayor Nakano allows the Magistrate to operate in Gotham, but Scarecrow reneges on his deal with Simon Saint and infects Peacekeeper-01 with his fear toxin before capturing Batman.

=== Main plot ===
In the past, it is revealed that Simon Saint met up with Scarecrow because Scarecrow developed a Fear State Theory, where society can evolve by exposing it to tremendous fear so it can be better (similar to how Bruce Wayne became Batman). Simon Saint helps free Scarecrow so Simon Saint can control Gotham City's societal evolution and make it better. In the present, Mayor Nakano allows the Magistrate Program full permission to perform police activities in Gotham City, and the recent bombings has made Gotham Citizens nervous. Renee Montoya is not pleased about this, and someone called the Anti-Oracle hijacked Barbara Gordon's computer to spread even more terror and locked Barbara out. Harley Quinn, Miracle Molly, the Unsanity Collective and Ghostmaker follow The Gardener to where Poison Ivy is, where it is revealed that Poison Ivy is feral because a strain of the original Mother Plant has taken control of her and Harley Quinn needs to find Poison Ivy's missing part. Batman escapes from Scarecrow and creates an antidote while Catwoman and Jace Fox observe how the Magistrate is taking over Gotham City. Cassandra Cain subdues Batman while he's distracted from his antidote to Scarecrow's Fear Toxin and he meets up with Barbara Gordon and Stephanie Brown where they bring him up to speed on what is happening. Batman also talks to Ghostmaker and Harley Quinn on what they are doing and realizes that Scarecrow is the true mastermind behind this. Seeing that Sean Mahoney is out of control due to the Fear Toxin, Simon Saint outfits his bodyguard Ricardo Huertas with a new Peacekeeper armor to apprehend Sean Mahoney. Batman tells Renee Montoya about Simon Saint and Scarecrows plans, and takes down Magistrate robots. Batman meets with Ghostmaker and they get a device to get rid of the rest of Scarecrow's fear toxin in Batman's head, with Ghostmaker revealing he met Scarecrow in the past and Scarecrow's plan to make Gotham City better by enacting his Fear State plan. Ricardo Huertas meets with Sean Mahoney and plans to take him down. Ricardo Huertas tries to calm down Sean Mahoney, but it is unsuccessful and Sean Mahoney attacks while under the influence of Scarecrow's Fear Toxin. Batman tries to intervene, but Sean Mahoney causes collateral damage and Ricardo is presumed to be dead. Miracle Molly realizes what Scarecrow is trying to do and goes to Batman to come with her.

Poison Ivy heals one of the Unsanity Members, and Master Wyze reveals that before he wiped his memory he was Dormiouse and worked with the Mad Hatter to remove people's trauma by wiping away their memories. Master Wyze wants to use Poison Ivy's powers to remove everyone's memory. While traveling to her hidden bases, Miracle Molly asks Batman why is he not scared, and Batman reveals that he is scared but he stays calm because he knows his allies are capable of saving Gotham City. Miracle Molly tells Batman that the machine used to wipe away people's memories also stores them, and Scarecrow may use her machine to gather a hundred people's trauma, and weaponize it on Gotham City. One of Simon Saint's workers tells Simon Saint that there is plant growth underneath Gotham City, and if Poison Ivy uses her abilities to full extent then Gotham City would be destroyed.

Simon Saint orders his robots to kill Poison Ivy, but Ghostmaker destroys the robots which causes Poison Ivy to freak out and unleash her powers on Gotham City. However, Harley Quinn and the Gardener arrive with another version of Poison Ivy. Batman and Miracle Molly confront Scarecrow, but Scarecrow uses the Unsanity Collective's technology to harm Miracle Molly. Scarecrow reveals he amplified Sean Mahoney's trauma to create a Fear Bomb on Gotham City. Batman tries to destroy the monitors, but Sean Mahoney shoots Scarecrow in the back. Sean Mahoney declares himself as the true hero Gotham City needs since Simon Saint just wants to control Gotham City through Power and Order, while Batman and Scarecrow's fear tactics makes them weak. Batman and Sean Mahoney fight once again, while Miracle Molly tries to get Scarecrow to disarm the fear bomb.

Harley Quinn reveals that after Poison Ivy was sent to the Sanctuary, the Gardener (Poison Ivy's ex-girlfriend) had a feeling that Poison Ivy would die soon so she took a part of Poison Ivy's soul and put it in a seed. The Magistrate tried to take control of the Poison Ivy duplicate, but Catwoman and her group saved the clone of Poison Ivy. Poison Ivy merges with her clone to be fully revived and cured of her feral state, and uses her pheromones to calm the city down and revive one of the Unsanity members before kissing Harley Quinn.

Nightwing, Tim Drake, Spoiler, Barbara Gordon, and Cassandra Cain arrive on the Magistrate's base to confront Simon Saint while Ghostmaker deals with the rest of Simon's robots. After a brutal battle, Batman manages to defeat Peacekeeper-01, but Scarecrow convinces Miracle Molly of her original goal to wipe out Gotham City's memories so they can overcome trauma. Batman manages to convince Miracle Molly to not release the fear toxin by stating that humans are inherently good because when politicians, media and corporations are removed, humans have the ability to overcome anything. Miracle Molly agrees to disarm the bomb, and the Bat Family (Nightwing, Barbara Gordon, Cassandra Cain, Spoiler, Tim Drake, Duke Thomas, Jace Fox, Batwoman) and Harley Quinn look up at the Bat Signal in the sky as Gotham City slowly recovers.

=== Epilogue ===
Scarecrow tries to escape from the authorities, but Batman prevents this and takes him to Arkham Asylum to meet Chase Meridian. While driving, Batman reveals that Scarecrow was afraid of change which was why he launched the Fear State on Gotham City, but Gotham City is always changing and evolving. Miracle Molly testifies how Simon Saint used the Unsanity Collective to manipulate the media in order to use the Magistrate Program. In exchange, Miracle Molly is sent to prison, and the Unsanity Collective goes into hiding, and Batman letting them go because the Unsanity Collective are people looking for a second chance. Batman knows Jace Fox is wearing a Batman suit to patrol Gotham City, Simon Saint was put on house arrest and his weaponry was taken by the government. Sean Mahoney escapes from the authorities and is sent into hiding, while Poison Ivy threatens the Gardener to never take a soul out of her again.

=== Tie-in plots ===
==== Batman: Urban Legends ====
In Batman: Urban Legends #8, Batwoman is helping rehabilitate Beth Kane when Renee Montoya arrives and tells her that there is a viral video of Cassandra Cain murdering innocent people. Batwoman confronts Cassandra, and they meet up with Beth to deal with the Anti-Oracle. Azrael deals with the Magistrate, where he is confronted by Batman who tells him to not kill any people. In "Future State" (an alternate future timeline that takes 30 years after) Gotham City is a dystopia due to Scarecrow's Fear State being successful. Future Duke Thomas sends Future Black Lightning to the present where Future Black Lightning meets up with the Outsiders in a boxing ring to tell them how to stop the dystopian future. Future Black Lightning explains that a man named Jonah Winfield was a normal boy until he met Scarecrow and was exposed to a high dose of fear toxin and became disfigured. Jonah Winfield would become a being known as Fearful who secretes fear toxin and would cause the dark future. The Outsiders confront John Winfield but are exposed to the Fear Toxin.

In issue #9, Beth deals with criminals and asks them where is the Seer, where the Magistrate attack. Batwoman arrives and save Beth from the Magistrate, where Beth finally manages to make peace with her other personalities. Duke Thomas is under the effect of Scarecrow's fear toxin and attacks Tim Drake, but Tim Drake breaks Scarecrow's control of Duke. Duke regroups with the Outsiders (Katana, Black Lightning, and Metamorpho) to break them out of the fear toxin. Duke and the Outsiders meet up with Tim Drake and Clownhunter (whom Tim Drake saved) to confront Scarecrow's apprentice, (Jonah Winfield), at the laboratory. Black Lightning and Duke Thomas injected Jonah with adrenaline which caused his body to burn out the fear toxin and this causes changes in the future where Future State Black Lightning's curse is lifted and the Future outsiders face off Clayface.

==== Catwoman (vol. 5) ====
In issue #34, Batman gives Catwoman a hard drive of Karl Snenke (an assassin hired by Scarecrow to assassinate Catwoman), and Catwoman reveals to Batman she found Poison Ivy changed due to Simon Saint using her to make a drug. After Catwoman confronts Karl Sneke and a bomb goes off, Scarecrow broadcasts that Batman is dead. Catwoman hears from Oracle from a different channel that Batman is not dead, and help is on the way. Catwoman realizes that the Magistrate are coming after Poison Ivy and with the help of Riddler she finds Killer Croc, Harley Quinn, The Gardener, and Cheshire to get Poison Ivy and fend off the Magistrate. While escorting Poison Ivy, Catwoman is attacked by the Magistrate. The Magistrate captures Poison Ivy, while the Riddler controls Alleytown. Catwoman reveals to Riddler that she knew what was happening, and she had Clayface impersonate Poison Ivy before the Magistrate confronts them. Ghostmaker and Catwoman team up to defeat the Magistrate, and Catwoman declares that she is not afraid anymore.

==== Detective Comics ====
In issue #1043, Simon Saint tries to persuade Mayor Nakano to let the Magistrate program continue. After Simon Saint leaves, the Red Crown terrorist group, led by a man known as Nero XIX, reveal themselves as having been disguised as Nakano's security team and kidnap him. Batman saves Mayor Nakano and they head into a sewer where they see red eggs featuring centipedes. Batwoman goes to the mayor's office and retakes the building from the Red Crown while Oracle helps Batman locate Mayor Nakano. The eggs hatch and one of the centipedes lands on Mayor Nakano's skin. Batman is forced to electrocute Mayor Nakano to get rid of the centipedes. Batman performs CPR on Mayor Nakano, and they stumble upon the Centipedes nest. Batman reveals that he was infected by the same parasites from Mr. Worth and Penguin. Batwoman sees the parasites starting to attack Gotham City, and Mayor Nakano saves Batman from the parasites before deciding that he will create a list.

==== Nightwing (vol. 4) ====
In issue #84, Nightwing is out patrolling in Bludhaven when he gets an encrypted audio from Barbara Gordon to go back to Gotham City. When Nightwing goes to Gotham City, he is attacked by the Magistrate but is saved by Batman. Batman asks Nightwing why did he come to Gotham City, and Nightwing replies that Gotham City is his home too. Batman leaves, but not without praising Nightwing's work in Bludhaven. Nightwing meets with Barbara Gordon, where he realizes that Barbara did not send the message at all and it was someone else. Barbara Gordon realizes she needs to help out more, and suits up as Batgirl once more.

Barbara Gordon realizes the hacker's name is Seer is behind all of this, and asks Spoiler, Cassandra Cain, Black Canary, Green Arrow and Wonder Woman to stay alert in case Seer tries to have false information. When they go to Seer's hideout, both of them are dosed with Fear Toxin, and Barbara has a vision where Dick Grayson was shot in the head similar to KG Beast. Tim Drake gives them an antidote where Barbara kisses Nightwing. Barbara Gordon hacks into the Seer's camera where she knows Seer is up in Magistrate's headquarters. However, Seer seemingly shows Cassandra Cain and Spoiler going to Barbara's old hideout before the hideout explodes.

It is revealed that Cassandra Cain and Spoiler were safe all along because they were attacked by the Magistrate and managed to escape. The group steal Peacekeeper armor, and they go confront Simon Saint and save kids being held hostage. Nightwing and Oracle bring down the Magistrate Skybase, with Seer (a young girl) escaping the heroes.

== Issues involved ==
Title	Issues	Release date	Writer	Artist(s)	Colorist
Batman: Fear State – Alpha	#1	August 2021	James Tynion IV	Riccardo Federici	Chris Sotomayor
Batman: Fear State – Omega	#1	December 2021	James Tynion IV	Riccardo Federici	Chris Sotomayor
Batman (vol. 3)	#112–117	September 2021–November 2021	James Tynion IV	Jorge Jimenez	Tomeu Morey
Batman Secret Files: Miracle Molly	#1	September 22, 2021	James Tynion IV	Dani Strips	Lee Loughridge
Batman Secret Files: Peacekeeper-01	#1	October 2021	James Tynion IV; Ed Brisson	Joshua Hixson	Roman Stevens
Batman Secret Files: The Gardener	#1	November 2021	James Tynion IV	Christian Ward	
Batman: Urban Legends	#8–9	October 2021–November 2021	Alyssa Wong; Brandon Thomas	Vasco Georgiev; Cian Tormey	Rain Beredo Alejandro Sanchez
Catwoman (vol. 5)	#34–37	August 2021–November 2021	Ram V	Fernando Blanco; Nina Vakueva	Jordie Bellaire
Detective Comics	#1043–1045	September 2021–November 2021	Mariko Tamaki	Dan Mora	Jordie Bellaire
Harley Quinn (vol. 4)	#7–9	August 2021–November 2021	Stephanie Phillips	Laura Braga	Ivan Plascencia
I Am Batman	#2–3	August 2021–November 2021	John Ridley	Stephen Segovia	Rex Lokus
Nightwing (vol. 4)	#84–86	September 2021–November 2021	Tom Taylor	Robbi Rodriguez	Adriano Lucas

== Collected editions ==
Title	Material collected	Format	Pages	Published date	ISBN
Batman: Fear State Saga	Batman (vol. 3) #112–117; Batman Secret Files: The Gardener; Peacekeeper; Miracle Molly; Alpha; Omega	HC	320	26 Apr 2022	978-1779515247
Batman: Fear State Saga	Batman (vol. 3) #112–117; Batman Secret Files: The Gardener; Peacekeeper; Miracle Molly; Alpha; Omega	TPB	320	18 Apr 2023	978-1779520036
Batman Vol. 5: Fear State	Batman (vol. 3) #112–117	HC	160	12 Mar 2022	978-1779514301
Batman Vol. 5: Fear State	Batman (vol. 3) #112–117	TPB	160	5 Dec 2023	978-1779519900
Batman: Detective Comics Vol. 2: Fear State	Detective Comics #1040–1045; Batman Secret Files: Huntress	HC	240	5 Jul 2022	978-1779515551
Batman: Detective Comics Vol. 2: Fear State	Detective Comics #1040–1045; Batman Secret Files: Huntress	TPB	240	27 Jun 2023	978-1779520180
Nightwing Vol. 2: Fear State	Nightwing (vol. 4) #84–88; Nightwing Annual (2021)	HC	152	21 Jun 2022	978-1779515506
Nightwing Vol. 2: Fear State	Nightwing (vol. 4) #84–88; Nightwing Annual (2021)	TPB	152	5 Sep 2023	978-1779520050
Catwoman Vol. 6: Fear State	Catwoman (vol. 5) #34–38	TPB	136	5 Jul 2022	978-1779515292

== Critical reception ==
The crossover overall received positive reviews from critics, with many critics praising the action, the artwork, the plot, and the tie-ins. However, there was criticism due to the story's sluggish pacing. According to Comic Book Roundup, the main event received a score of 7.5 out of 10. David Brooke from AIPT wrote "Batman #116 is a feast for the eyes, and an exciting comic due to its backup and some exciting action-packed moments. The main story moves the story forward very little, but it does bring us closer to the end of "Fear State" in the slickest looking book of the week". Joshua McDonald from Batman News wrote: "After months of dragging its feet, James Tynion's "Fear State" finally moves the plot forward. There is still an abundance of problems here, but at least we got something positive. Granted, I feel like a shill for praising something as rudimentary as plot progression, but that is unfortunately the reality we live in these days". Max Byrne from Dark Knight News wrote: "Batman #117 brings everything nicely to a well crafted close. The "Fear State" arc has been engrossing and exciting, dangerous and heartfelt. Gotham City has gone through the wringer yet again, and has come out the other side in a better place. The future is bright, the future is Batman!"
