= Batman and Robin Eternal =

6-month weekly limited series published by DC Comics

- Cover of Batman and Robin Eternal #1 (October 2015 DC Comics). Art by Tony S. Daniel.

Publication information
- Publisher: DC Comics
- Schedule: Weekly
- Format: Limited series
- Genre: Superhero
- Publication date: October 2015 – March 2016
- No. of issues: 26
- Main characters: Batman; Batman Family; Dick Grayson; Cassandra Cain; Bluebird; Orphan; Scarecrow; Mother

Creative team
- Written by: James Tynion IV, Scott Snyder, Tim Seeley, Steve Orlando, Genevieve Valentine, Jackson Lanzing, Collin Kelly, Ed Brisson
- Artist(s): Tony S. Daniel, Paul Pelletier, Scot Eaton, Álvaro Martínez, Roge Antonio, Fernando Blanco, Fernando Pasarin, Christian Duce, Andrea Mutti, Marcio Takara
- Colorist: Gabe Eltaeb
- Editor(s): Chris Conroy, Dave Wielgosz, Mark Doyle

Batman and Robin Eternal is a 6-month weekly limited series published by DC Comics, that began in October 2015 and concluded in March 2016. The series featured Batman, Robin, and their allies, and was a follow-up series to Batman Eternal. Batman and Robin Eternal was written by James Tynion IV, Scott Snyder, Tim Seeley, Steve Orlando, Genevieve Valentine, Jackson Lanzing, Collin Kelly, and Ed Brisson.

== Batman Day 8-page preview ==
In September 2015, DC Comics held another Batman Day celebration, re-releasing Batman #35 as Batman: Endgame Special Edition for free in stores and electronically. This comic contained an 8-page preview of Batman and Robin Eternal written by Tynion and drawn by Tony S. Daniel, announced as the lead artist for the series. The 8-page preview format matched what DC Comics had done at the end of the Convergence event, with 8-page previews giving readers a taste of the new, relaunched, or continuing series coming in June.

In the preview, two timelines converge on the climax of the forthcoming series - Batman hiding a secret on a Bat-flashdrive concerning the villain "Mother" from Dick Grayson many years ago, while Grayson was still Robin, and in the future, a massive worldwide battle between Mother's forces and the Batfamily.

== Plot ==
The series switches between the present, where Dick Grayson and his allies battle the plans of the mysterious Mother, and the past, where Batman and Robin face the Scarecrow for the first time.

=== Present ===
Dick Grayson, on assignment for Spyral, teams up with Tim Drake (Red Robin) and Jason Todd (Red Hood) to stop a cyborg cyclist. Later, he is attacked by a group of children and his own field handler, both claiming to act on behalf of someone called "Mother". Running away, he meets a nearly silent young woman who also says one word - "Mother", but instead of attempting to kill him, she deliberately holds back and gives him a Bat-flashdrive containing a confession from Batman, as well as a list of names. The recording identifies the young woman as Cassandra Cain.

Harper Row, bitter that Batman's apparent death at the hand of the Joker has robbed her of the chance to be Batman's partner, suffers an attack by one of Mother's agents calling himself the Orphan. Cassandra Cain saves her, then chases after the Orphan. Dick meets Harper and her roommate Stephanie Brown (the Spoiler), and takes them to the Batcave to get Harper medical attention and meet with Tim and Jason. Dick's superior, Helena Bertinelli, Matron of Spyral, discovers that Mother's agents are going to attack Bruce Wayne at a party.

Dick rushes off to save Bruce, and is met by members of the We Are Robin gang (including Duke Thomas) and Batgirl. They save Bruce from dozens of ax-wielding assassins, and Dick follows a lead while Tim, Jason, and Stephanie deal with the disappearance of an injured Harper and the mysterious Cassandra.

Dick's lead turns out to be Tim's witness-protection-program parents, which causes a split in the Robins - Tim and Jason investigating one lead, Dick another. Dick, Harper, and Cass head to Prague, where they find Mother waiting for them. She entices Dick to join her, but he rejects her offer and instead battles her agents at the ballet alongside Harper and Cass. In the wake of their victory, Harper accidentally triggers something in Cass, who flees.

Jason and Tim follow the electronic signal that coincided with the attack on Bruce and find Bane attempting to take back his former country from the mysterious Order of St. Dumas. Working together with the villain, Jason and Tim stumble upon Azrael, also known as Jean-Paul Valley, apparently another one of Mother's children, sold to the Order as an angel of death against their enemies. Tim suffers the effects of Azrael's mental attack, and Jason carries him away to safety.

Dick and Harper follow the trail of the Orphan to the identity of David Cain, but are surprised to find the Sculptor, Cain's other half in Mother's inner circle. The Sculptor has powerful telepathic powers which Mother uses to shape children traumatized by Cain's violence. Using these powers, the Sculptor shows Harper Cassandra's training, deprived of language so that she must read movement and body cues, and forced to kill a woman in a dark alley. Dick breaks the mind meld when the Sculptor begins showing Harper Batman's meetings and deals with Mother, but the Sculptor only shows Dick her own orphaning and abduction by Mother, as well as a few hints of what Batman did in her service, before she disappears and reveals the entire encounter was her projection.

Based on the Sculptor's warning, Dick and Harper know that Mother is murdering all of her old children, and rush to her training center, the Nursery, where they find Cassandra standing against her father. Inspired by her meeting with Batman, Cassandra paints the Bat on her face with blood as a mask, and together, Dick, Harper, and Cass fight their way defeat David Cain and barely escaped from the nuclear self destruction of the base and on to Spyral's headquarters to plan their next moves.

Tim Drake meets with Azrael and asks to join him in exchange for Jason Todd being held prisoner. Azrael takes Tim Drake to his leader Saint Dumas, where Saint Dumas tells Tim Drake and Azrael to kill each other to prove their worthiness. During the fight, Tim Drake releases an EMP in Saint Dumas room which shuts down the program and immobilizes Azrael, but is overpowered by Saint Dumas telekinetic abilities. Saint Dumas also uses mind control on Jason Todd, making him see Joker again in his mind and overpowers Saint Dumas mind control. At the same time, Azrael decides to team up with Tim Drake after realizing Saint Dumas never cared for him at all, and they both escape while telling the rest of the Bat Family that they found the signal for Mother's location, and Mother's children are innocent.

Dick Grayson and Helena try to interrogate David Cain to no success, but Jason Todd and Tim Drake meet up with them, while Harper Row confronts David Cain on what he did to Cassandra. Tim Drake explains that Mother is creating a project called Ichthys which is a virus that will erase everyone's fears so that she can control them more effectively. Harper Row learns from David Cain that Mother ordered Cassandra Cain to kill her parents and Batman knew the truth but kept it from her. David Cain escapes after incapacitating Harper Row and Jason Todd, and Project Ichthys activates which causes Tim Drake and Cassandra to attack Dick Grayson and Helena. Dick Grayson and Helena manage to free Tim Drake and Cassandra by making them exposed to Scarecrow's gas and they go find Harper Row and Jason Todd.

Harper Row attacks Cassandra while David Cain fights against Helena and Tim Drake manages to deactivate Project Ichthys. In the ensuing chaos, David Cain and Poppy (Dick Grayson's ex-partner who betrayed him) manage to kidnap Cassandra and Harper Row. Helena tells Dick Grayson that there was a project called Somnius which will make the world forget Dick Grayson was Nightwing, but just then Damian Wayne arrives. While on the plane, the Robins start to lose hope on finding Mother but Damian Wayne tells them that Batman is proud of all of them in their own way, which motivates them enough for Dick Grayson to create a plan. Mother kills David Cain due to his repeated failures, and activates Project Ichthys around the world.

The Robins meet up with Midnighter, Batgirl and Stephanie Brown to get weapons to try to stop Mother's signal from broadcasting the world. Jason Todd gets Scarecrow from Arkham in order to build a lot of fear toxin which will counteract Project Ichthys effects. Matron, Batgirl, Stephanie Brown, Katana, Black Canary, Catwoman, Spiral, and Batwoman join the Robins in trying to stop Mother and the enslaved children while Nightwing tries to convince Azrael to not kill Mother. Mother tries to convince Harper Row to kill Cassandra, but Harper Row disagrees and Mother plans to kill Harper but Nightwing arrives. The rest of the bat family manage to cure the rest of the infected children with the help of a man named Cullen, and Harper manages to shut down Project Ichthys for good. Azrael manages to destroy the rest of Mother's machines, and David Cain kills Mother before falling to their death in an exploding volcano.

A month later, Bruce Wayne comes back to talk to Harper Row about her mother's death, and Harper Row tells Batman she wants to quit being a hero in order to help people on her own terms. Batman allows Cassandra Cain to join him, and he reconciles with Nightwing over the recent events before heading off with Tim Drake, Damian Wayne, and Jason Todd to stop a heist.

=== Past ===
In Dick's first confrontation with a supervillain as Batman's partner, Batman and Robin face Jonathan Crane's students, driven insane by Scarecrow's fear toxin. Later, they are ambushed by Crane in a cornfield and first exposed to the fear toxin. They follow Scarecrow to a meeting with the Orphan and Cassandra Cain, and discover that the villains are headed to Prague. After a failed attempt to stop Scarecrow's plane, Bruce discovers the existence of a woman known as Mother from a fellow society member, who tells him he purchased his wife made to order by this human trafficker. The man is murdered by the Orphan that night, and Batman keeps the secret from Dick, telling him that they are chasing Scarecrow alone to Prague. After setting up an international Batcave, Batman secretly meets with Mother and Orphan, apparently wanting to replace Dick with a more reliable partner. Batman and Robin conduct an assault on Scarecrow's warehouse, and while Robin disables a bomb on the roof, Batman forces Scarecrow to work for him against Mother due to Scarecrow disagreeing with Mother's plan to get rid of all fear in the world. In his ambition, Scarecrow reveals that Mother plans to gas every major city in the world with his newly created "trauma toxin", leaving billions of children ripe for her new process of brainwashing and manipulation. Batman leaves Scarecrow, and it was revealed that in the past Scarecrow met with Mother who explained Batman's psychological profile on fear.

Batman and Robin go to Cairo to find out what Scarecrow has been up to, and Robin takes down Scarecrow. Batman then takes a gun and shoots one of Mother's henchmen to gain Mother's trust, but it's revealed Batman only shot to injure not kill, and revealed to Mother he only pretended that Dick Grayson was a mistake to keep him safe from her. Batman defeats David Cain, but Mother distracts him long enough for David Cain to knock him out. Batman eventually overpowers David Cain and confronts Mother who tells her Batman's successor was supposed to be Harper Row, and Batman is forced to watch as Cassandra Cain kills Harper Row's mother. Mother ingests Cyanide to prevent Batman from taking her in, and Batman is forced to escape as guards arrive.

Batman tells Robin that he needs to go to Europe to tie up loose ends to meet up a woman name Miss Marchencko who tells Batman the origin of Mother, and as Batman leaves its revealed that Mother faked her death and kills Miss Marchencko. Batman goes back to Gotham City and decides to not train Harper Row due to the deaths of her parents. Batman finally deletes all traces of Mother from his computer.

== Premise and characters ==
Cassandra Cain returned to mainstream continuity in Batman and Robin Eternal, and serves as one of three main characters alongside Dick Grayson and Harper Row (Bluebird).

== Critical reception ==
According to Comicbook Roundup, Batman and Robin Eternal received an average score of 7.2 out of 10 based on 315 reviews.

== Collected editions ==
Title	Material collected	Published date	ISBN
Batman and Robin Eternal Vol. 1	Batman and Robin Eternal #1-12, DC Sneak Peek: Batman and Robin Eternal #1	March 2016	978-1401259679
Batman and Robin Eternal Vol. 2	Batman and Robin Eternal #13-26	July 2016	978-1401262488
