= Batman: War Games =

2004–05 DC Comics storyline

"War Games"
- Cover to Batman: War Games, Act Three trade paperback (October 2005), art by James Jean.
- Publisher: DC Comics
- Publication date: October 2004 – January 2005
- Genre: Superhero; Crossover
Title(s)
Batman #631-634
Batman: The 12 Cent Adventure
Batman: Gotham Knights #56-58
Batgirl #55-57
Catwoman (vol. 2) #34-36
Detective Comics #797-800
Batman: Legends of the Dark Knight #182-184
Nightwing #96-98
Robin (vol. 2) #129-131
- Main character(s): Batman; Black Mask; Spoiler; Oracle; Batgirl; Nightwing; Robin; Catwoman

Creative team
- Writer(s): A. J. Lieberman, Bill Willingham, Andersen Gabrych, Devin Grayson, Dylan Horrocks, Ed Brubaker, Greg Rucka
- Penciller(s): Raymond Bachs, Pete Woods, Brad Walker, Mike Lilly, Sean Phillips, Giuseppe Camuncoli, Jon Proctor, Thomas Derenick, Kinsun, Paul Lee, Paul Gulacy
- Inker(s): Raul Fernandez, Rodney Ramos, Nathan Massengill, Cam Smith, Drew Geraci, Troy Nixey, Andy Owens, Sean Phillips, Lorenzo Ruggiero, Robert Campanella, Aaron Sowd, Adam DeKraker, Brian Horton
- Act One: Outbreak: ISBN 978-1401204297
- Act Two: Tides: ISBN 978-1401204303
- Act Three: Endgame: ISBN 978-1401204310

"War Games" is a 2004-2005 major storyline comic book story arc published by the comic book publishing company DC Comics that ran in its Batman family of titles, Detective Comics, Batman: Legends of the Dark Knight, Nightwing, Batman: Gotham Knights, Robin, Batgirl, Catwoman, Batman, and Gotham Central. The storyline, which was published from October 2004 until January 2005, was preceded by a prologue that appeared in Batman: The 12 Cent Adventure.

== Synopsis ==
The plot revolves around a gang war involving all the major criminal groups in Gotham City. It starts with one of Batman's most ambitious contingency plans for a possible outbreak of uncontrollable gang violence, Batman developed an elaborate scenario that would unite all of Gotham's underworld under a single crime boss: Matches Malone, who is really an alias of Batman himself.

This plan is discovered by Stephanie Brown, who was serving as Batman's sidekick Robin at the time, and who was unaware that Malone and Batman were one and the same, believing that he was simply an employee of Batman. When Stephanie is fired from the Robin position, she attempts to regain Batman's trust and confidence by implementing the contingency plan without Batman's knowledge or participation. Thus, Malone is not present when Stephanie, having returned to her former identity of Spoiler, assembles the leaders of all of the gangs into one place. The meeting ends disastrously, with numerous crime bosses and henchmen killed (including Lew Moxon, Hellhound, Silver Monkey, and NKVDemon) and all of the gangs in Gotham going to war with one another.

During the gang war, the crime lord Black Mask seizes control of all the gangs by kidnapping Stephanie and torturing her for the information she possesses, and becomes the most powerful crime lord of Gotham City. Stephanie is seemingly killed, for which Batman holds himself responsible.

== Aftermath ==
Besides the aforementioned death of Stephanie Brown, many other side effects came about from this event. The biggest of these included Black Mask becoming the single crime boss in Gotham, something that would remain until his death at the hands of Catwoman. Another would be Commissioner Akins effectively making all vigilantes criminals, a move that would stay in place for over a year until the return of Commissioner Gordon to the Gotham City Police Department. The more controversial effect, not seen until the follow-up story War Crimes, was turning Leslie Thompkins against Batman, when she allows Stephanie Brown to die from her wounds as Batman's "punishment" for including children in his war on crime. Jason Todd, a former Robin who was killed years prior, was confirmed to be alive on Batman: Under the Hood and operating as a violent vigilante called the Red Hood, who waged a one-man war against Black Mask and successfully crippled his criminal operation in the city before seeking revenge against Batman and the Joker. Finally, the citizens of Gotham City no longer consider Batman to be an urban legend (which has been in place since Zero Hour), as he was caught on camera trying to save the life of a wounded student at the end of Act One. Additionally, Barbara Gordon lost the clock tower that served as her home and headquarters and left Gotham City, eventually moving to Metropolis. She would later re-establish her ties to Batman.

Stephanie's death would also lead to the mystery of her later appearances in the pages of Gotham Underground and Robin as a mysterious female vigilante wearing the Spoiler costume, later unmasked to be Stephanie herself. Stephanie's death was retconned by writer Chuck Dixon, revealing that Thompkins switched her body with a deceased victim who had a similar body type and treated her in secret.

== Planned death of Stephanie ==
At the 2011 Auckland Writers and Readers Festival, former Batgirl writer Dylan Horrocks said that the writers were told by editorial that the crossover would be "involve some kind of gang war in Gotham" and involve Stephanie's death. Her debut as Robin was, according to her story, "purely as a trick to play on the readers, that we would fool them into thinking that the big event [War Games] was that Stephanie Brown would become Robin but we knew all along it was a temporary thing, and she was then going to die at the end of this crossover story". Both Horrocks and Nightwing writer Devin Grayson opposed the move during planning, to the extent that Horrocks deliberately kept Batgirl out of several key events in the story.

== Reading order ==
War Drums:

- Detective Comics #790-796
- Robin (vol. 4) #126-128
- Batgirl #53
- Solo #10

Act One - Outbreak:

- Prelude: Batman: The 12 Cent Adventure #1
- Part 1: Detective Comics #797
- Part 2: Batman: Legends of the Dark Knight #182
- Part 3: Nightwing #96
- Part 4: Batman: Gotham Knights #56
- Part 5: Robin (vol. 4) #129
- Part 6: Batgirl #55
- Part 7: Catwoman (vol. 3) #34
- Part 8: Batman #631

Act Two - Tides:

- Part 1: Detective Comics #798
- Part 2: Batman: Legends of the Dark Knight #183
- Part 3: Nightwing #97
- Part 4: Batman: Gotham Knights #57
- Part 5: Robin (vol. 4) #130
- Part 6: Batgirl #56
- Part 7: Catwoman (vol. 3) #35
- Part 8: Batman #632

Act Three - Endgame:

- Part 1: Detective Comics #799
- Part 2: Batman: Legends of the Dark Knight #184
- Part 3: Nightwing #98
- Part 4: Robin (vol. 4) #131
- Part 5: Batman: Gotham Knights #58
- Part 6: Batgirl #57
- Part 7: Catwoman (vol. 3) #36
- Part 8: Batman #633
- Epilogue: Detective Comics #800
- Epilogue: Batman #634

=== Modern releases ===
Starting in November 2015, DC began to release new editions of the War Games arc, with the first volume composed of the issues from the original release mixed in with the issues that were originally used for the prequel "collected edition", Batman: War Drums, as well as a brief story from the Solo series by Damion Scott about Stephanie Brown as Robin and the issues Robin #121 and Batgirl #53, which were not part of the original release.

The second and final volume which was released in May 2016 contained the rest, which was the issues originally used for the second and third volumes of the original release, combined with the ones from the post-story "collected edition", Batman: War Crimes and Batman #642, which was not part of the original trade paperback release.
