= Damion Scott =

American illustrator, writer (born 1976)

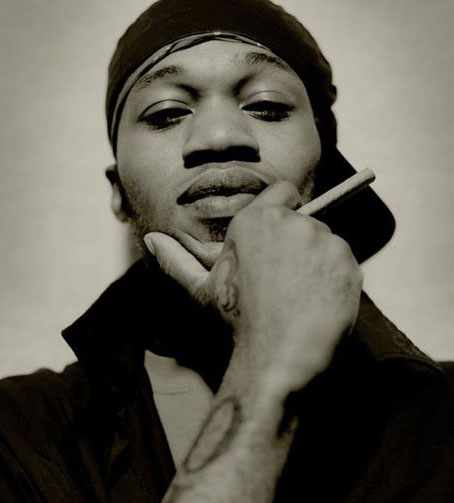
- Born: 1976 (age 49–50)
- Areas: Writer, Artist
- Pseudonyms: Dre, Mosh
- Notable works: How to Draw Hip-Hop

Damion Scott (born 1976) is an American comic book artist and writer, known for his work on books such as Batman, Robin, and Batgirl, Web of Spider-Man, and Duppy. He splits his time between New York and Tokyo, where he founded an art studio that publishes a Japanese comic called Saturday Morning Cartoons or SAM-C.

== Career ==
Scott graduated from The Kubert School in the late 1990s.

His drawing style is influenced by Hip hop culture. In 2006 Scott wrote a book, How To Draw Hip-Hop, which was published by Watson-Guptill.

Scott has worked on several DC Comics, including Batman, Robin, and Batgirl. Scott has also worked on Spider-Man, for Marvel Comics. He illustrated issue #10 of the Solo series in 2006.

In 2007, Scott moved to Japan to pursue commercial and fine art, doing magazine illustrations, street art and gallery shows.

Scott drew a Raven miniseries for DC Comics. He currently lives in Japan and is heavily involved in the local art scene, having started an art studio in Tokyo and a Japanese comic titled Saturday Morning Cartoons or SAM-C. He participated in an Art Showcase in Harajyuku on October 17–18, 2009, entitled "Battle for the Big Toy". In September 2012 he drew two issues of Web of Spider-Man and has a series titled Duppy. He also illustrated The Brooklyn Avengers, a comic in which Spider-Man moves to Brooklyn.

In 2014, Scott took over the art duties for Ghost Rider, beginning with issue 6. In 2015 he assisted with "Daryl Makes Comics," a project by Darryl McDaniels.

Scott is currently illustrating Accell for Lion Forge Comics, written by Joe Casey, starting in June 2017. Fourteen issues and three trade paperback collections have been released so far.

== Personal life ==
Scott has lived in Japan since 2007, though as of 2012, he was splitting his time between Tokyo and New York.
