= Stephanie Brown (character) =

DC character

- Stephanie Brown as Spoiler as seen on the cover of Batman: Eternal #24 (September 2014). Art by Jason Fabok.

Publication information
- Publisher: DC Comics
- First appearance: As Stephanie Brown: Detective Comics #647 (June 1992); As the Spoiler: Detective Comics #648 (July 1992); As Robin: Robin (vol. 2) #126 (May 2004); As Batgirl: Batgirl (vol. 3) #1 (August 2009)
- Created by: Chuck Dixon (writer); Tom Lyle (artist)

In-story information
- Full name: Stephanie Brown
- Species: Human
- Team affiliations: Batman Family; Batman Inc.; Young Justice; Titans
- Partnerships: Batman; Oracle; Robin (Tim Drake)
- Notable aliases: Spoiler; Robin; Batgirl; Clu
- Abilities: Expert tracker; Master strategist and tactician; Trained computer hacker; Highly skilled hand-to-hand combatant and martial artist; Expert athlete and acrobat

Stephanie Brown is a superheroine appearing in American comic books published by DC Comics, most commonly in association with the superhero Batman. The character first appeared in Detective Comics #647 (June 1992), and was created by Chuck Dixon and Tom Lyle.

The character originated as the amateur crime-fighter Spoiler, who had taken it upon herself to foil her criminal father Cluemaster's schemes. Establishing herself as a Gotham vigilante, she would have a short, unsuccessful stint as the fourth incarnation of Batman's partner and sidekick Robin in the early 2000s, replacing her longtime love interest Tim Drake. Her time as Robin is plagued with struggles and dissensions with Batman, who eventually fires her shortly before her death at the hands of Black Mask. She is later revealed to have survived and returns as Spoiler, resuming her romantic relationship with Drake. In 2009, Cassandra Cain, the latest Batgirl, entrusts the costume and moniker to Brown; although she is initially reluctant due to Brown's disastrous spell as Robin, former Batgirl Barbara Gordon later takes Brown as a pupil, and the character's run as Batgirl largely redeems her, including in Batman's eyes.

After DC's continuity reboot in 2011, Brown is re-introduced as Spoiler in Batman Eternal in 2014, developing into a morally grey character that openly denounces Batman while resuming a complex romantic relationship with Drake. During the 2020 "The Joker War" storyline, Gordon, the sole Batgirl of the new continuity at that point, shares the moniker with both Brown and Cain to form a trio of Batgirls who were later featured in their own comic book series, Batgirls; in this continuity, Brown's costume is a mix of her old Batgirl costume and Spoiler's.

Brown remains the sole mainline female Robin, and the only person to have been both Robin and Batgirl, the superhero monikers commonly considered Batman's two closest allies. In other media, Brown was portrayed by Morgan Kohan in a 2021 episode of the Arrowverse series Batwoman, and by Anna Lore in Gotham Knights (2023), in which she is one of the main characters; she does not use the Spoiler, Robin or Batgirl monikers in either appearance.

== Publication history ==
Stephanie Brown was introduced in a three-issue story arc in Detective Comics #647–649 in which writer Chuck Dixon reinvented the supervillain Cluemaster. Dixon created the Cluemaster's daughter Stephanie as a plot device for this story, a young girl seeking to "spoil" her father's plans. The character was well received by fans, and the following year, Dixon launched the first ongoing Robin series featuring the Spoiler as a foil and love interest for Tim Drake. The character was at the center of a high-profile teen pregnancy storyline in 1998, which led Wizard Magazine to name Robin the best ongoing comic book of the year. She also joined the cast of Batgirl as a crimefighting friend to Cassandra Cain.

Stephanie remained an integral part of the Batman supporting cast for over a decade, until her death in the 2004 crossover storyline Batman: War Games. Her death was retconned to have been faked in a 2008 storyline, and she became the eponymous lead character in the 2009 Batgirl series written by Bryan Q. Miller, with pencils by Lee Garbett. The title was canceled after 24 issues and replaced with a new Batgirl series starring Barbara Gordon as part of the New 52 relaunch.

=== Death and controversy ===
Stephanie Brown on the cover of Detective Comics #809 (2005). Art by Jock.

Controversy arose in the fan community following the character's death, both in regards to her torture and the fact that even though she served as Robin for a time, she received no monument or memorial in the Batcave during the years of her apparent death (unlike the second Robin, Jason Todd). Lead writer Bill Willingham left Stephanie's legitimacy as Robin ambiguous: When Alfred Pennyworth asks if Batman accepted Stephanie as Robin only to lure Tim back to the cape, Batman evades the question, but when a dying Stephanie asks, "Was I ever really Robin?", he answers, "Of course you were."

During a Q&A at a convention in March 2007, DC executive editor Dan DiDio responded to questions about the absence of a Stephanie tribute from the Batcave, saying that the official position of DC Comics was that "She was never really a Robin". However, her memorial was present in later storylines, and was made unnecessary after the character's death was retconned.

At the 2011 Auckland Writers and Readers Festival, former Batgirl writer Dylan Horrocks said that the writers were told from the start that Spoiler would die during War Games, and she was made Robin "purely as a trick to play on the readers, that we would fool them into thinking that the big event was that Stephanie Brown would become Robin, but we knew all along it was a temporary thing, and she was then going to die at the end". Horrocks said he was uncomfortable with the "seedy" decision, and that he felt "pleased and vindicated" over the eventual controversy.

=== The New 52 ===
In September 2011, The New 52 rebooted DC's continuity. In this new timeline, Barbara Gordon took the role of Batgirl once again, with Stephanie Brown no longer existing in mainstream continuity. In June 2012, fans of the character attempted a letter movement, sending waffles, waffle mix, or letters to the editors, expressing a wish to see her published once more. Shortly thereafter, Dan DiDio claimed in an interview that about ten waffles had arrived and expressed doubt that her fandom was really as strong as it appeared.

On October 11, 2013, writer Scott Snyder announced at New York Comic Con that Brown would appear as Spoiler beginning in the third issue of DC's 2014 weekly series Batman Eternal. Brown made her first New 52 appearance in Batman (vol. 2) #28, a teaser issue for Batman Eternal. Brown appeared throughout the series, and later played a supporting role in its follow-up series Batman & Robin Eternal.

=== DC Rebirth and return as Batgirl ===
In 2016, DC's line-wide relaunch DC Rebirth returned Spoiler to the pages of Detective Comics, written by James Tynion IV. Initially a member of a new team under Batwoman's tutelage, she was recast as a foil to Batman, concerned that superheroes do more harm than good. Spoiler later appeared in DC's relaunch of Young Justice under the Wonder Comics imprint, as well as the miniseries Robins.

During The Joker War crossover, Brown and Cassandra Cain were jointly re-established as Batgirl. The duo went on to headline a new series, Batgirls, which ran for nineteen issues from 2021-2023. Brown later appeared as a supporting cast member in a relaunched Batgirl ongoing series starring Cain.

In May 2026, Brown joined the cast of Titans (renamed New Titans) as the leader of a new team roster. Later that year, Brown appeared in the Bad Seeds crossover, followed by the Gangs of Gotham limited series by Christopher Cantwell and Mike Henderson.

== Fictional character biography ==
Stephanie Brown is the daughter of the Cluemaster, one of Gotham City's third-rate criminals, and a registered nurse named Crystal Brown. Her father spends most of her childhood in jail or away from the family and claims to be rehabilitated upon his return to Gotham. Stephanie becomes furious when she discovers that he is actually returning to crime, this time not leaving his trademark clues behind. She decides something needs to be done.

=== The Spoiler ===
Stephanie as the Spoiler, in Detective Comics #648 (July 1992). Art by Tom Lyle.

Stephanie Brown tailors a costume for herself, and calls herself "the Spoiler" due to her attempts to spoil her father's plans. She learns where her father is hiding out, finds out his plans, and leaves clues so that the police and Batman could stop him. Robin (Tim Drake) tracks her down and, after a few brief confrontations, helps capture Cluemaster. Although she initially wishes to kill her father, Batman convinces her to allow him to be arrested.

Each time Cluemaster escapes or starts some new plan, Stephanie dons her costume again. Eventually, she decides she likes being a superhero, and she begins regular patrols as Spoiler. This also brings her into regular contact with Robin, on whom she has a bit of a crush. At first, Robin thinks of her as a pest, but later comes to enjoy her company. He was dating Ariana Dzerchenko at the time. However, the two sometimes work as partners, and during a point in which Robin and Ariana were unable to see each other, he and Stephanie grew even closer. Robin soon realizes that his feelings for Stephanie have grown into something more, and, after breaking up with Ariana, he begins dating Stephanie. Unfortunately, because Robin needs to maintain the secrecy of Batman and his allies, Robin is unable to reveal his true identity to Spoiler. At first, she seems happy with this arrangement.

Stephanie then finds out she is pregnant by an ex-boyfriend who had run from Gotham City after the earthquake depicted in Batman: Cataclysm. Robin, under the alias Alvin Draper, takes Stephanie to Lamaze classes, and the two become even closer. Robin moves to Keystone City during the last few months of her pregnancy, but he returns to her when she is giving birth. With Robin's help, she is able to cope with placing her child up for adoption. Although a painful experience, she feels it best to give her daughter a chance at a better life.

Soon after, Robin's father sends him away to boarding school, and the couple is forced into a long-distance relationship, made even more complicated by the fact that Stephanie still did not know his real name. During his time away, Robin befriends a girl named Star. One night, after seeing her go into an alley with some suspicious-looking people, Robin decides to follow her in costume. He runs into Stephanie, also on patrol, and she follows him as he tracks down Star to a gang meeting that erupts in a violent shootout. He saves Star, but Stephanie is convinced that he is cheating on her, and refuses to see him afterward.

Shortly after this, Robin disappears from Gotham for several days, because he is in Tibet on a secret mission. In his absence, Spoiler realizes that she still wants to be with him. Batman approaches Spoiler to try to discover Tim's whereabouts, and then offers to train her. He also tells her Robin's real name, and this betrayal by Batman drives a wedge between the two. Spoiler begins to train with Batman, Batgirl, and, briefly, the Birds of Prey.

Stephanie and Tim, as she now knows him, reconcile. Even after Batman, having decided that she was not crime fighter material, tells her to hang up her costume and have the Birds of Prey stop mentoring her, she still patrols secretly, in addition to going on occasional dates with Robin in their civilian identities. When the U.S. government comes to Stephanie and her mother and tells her that Cluemaster had died while working for the Suicide Squad, Stephanie is shocked. She temporarily cuts off ties with Tim and goes on a vigilante rampage, hunting down the Riddler, her father's former associate, to try to get a better idea of who he had been in life. Eventually, she makes peace with his memory, and she and Tim rekindle their relationship.

Stephanie is later injured during Tim's battle with the occult hitman Johnny Warlock, breaking her leg. In a fit of rage, Tim apparently beats Warlock to death (though he would later be magically resurrected), which sends him into a deep, angry depression. He refuses to speak with Stephanie, whom he blames for him killing Warlock.

=== Robin ===
Stephanie Brown as Robin. Promotional art for Robin (vol. 2) #126. Art by Damion Scott.

Stephanie Brown snaps Tim Drake out of his depression just as his father Jack Drake discovers he is Robin. After Warlock's death, Tim's father orders him to hang up his cape, and Tim is forced to live a normal life for a time. One day after school, Stephanie attempts to surprise Tim with a visit. As she arrives, however, she catches a female classmate, Darla Aquista, attempting to seduce him. Assuming that Tim is being unfaithful, she breaks off ties with Tim and angrily decides to put her attention elsewhere. Creating a homemade Robin costume, Stephanie sneaks into the Batcave and demands that Batman train her as the new Robin. Batman reluctantly accepts her as the new Robin, puts her through several months of intensive training, and makes her a better costume with roughly the same design as Tim's. As Robin, she patrols with Batman, but he thinks she isn't skilled enough to replace Tim. Batman later fires her after she disobeys him in the field.

In an effort to prove her worth to Batman, Stephanie steals one of his long-term plans for dealing with the entirety of Gotham's criminal underworld, arranging a meeting to bring them all together. Since this plan is predicated on the involvement of "Matches Malone" who, unbeknownst to her, is a persona that Batman uses to infiltrate the underworld, it quickly spins out of control. The result is a citywide gang war in which Stephanie is captured by the Black Mask. She is tortured extensively by Black Mask to get information about Batman, as well as learning enough information to allow him to take control of Batman's plan and assume command of the gangs himself. Although she escapes and makes her way to a hospital, she is severely injured, and supposedly dies in a hospital bed as Batman sits beside her.

Batman later finds evidence that a vital medical treatment that could have saved Stephanie's life had been denied by Doctor Leslie Thompkins. When Batman confronts the doctor, Thompkins claims she willfully withheld such treatment to send a warning to any of Gotham's youth intending to follow Stephanie's example.

=== Posthumous appearances ===
Promotional art for Batgirl #62. Art by Alé Garza.

Following her death, Stephanie Brown appears twice in the Batgirl series. The first time, in Batgirl #62, Cassandra Cain meets her during a near death experience. Then, in Batgirl #72–73, Cassandra is near death following a battle with Mad Dog when Stephanie's "ghost" appears before her again and informs Cassandra of her true parentage and of Blüdhaven's destruction. During the Titans East storyline, a glass case with Stephanie's Spoiler costume (alongside cases with clothing representing Tim Drake's parents and Conner Kent) is in a room Deathstroke uses to torture Robin. Barbara Gordon uses photos of her autopsy to dissuade another young superheroine, Misfit, from using the name Batgirl.

=== Spoiler returns ===
In the events following The Resurrection of Ra's al Ghul, Robin follows the trail of a female thief called Violet. This leads him to reunite with his friend Ives during social service classes at St. Camillus Cathedral. He also has random encounters with a blonde student in high school that trigger his memories of Stephanie. During his quest to find Violet, he is followed by a character dressed as Spoiler. This Spoiler reveals herself to Robin, trying to warn him that Violet led him to an ambush. Believing someone else is dressing up as Spoiler, Robin falls into Violet's trap after Spoiler addresses him by his real name.

After escaping the ambush, Robin and Batman track down the woman in a bid to force her to stop imitating Stephanie. When confronted, she removes her mask and reveals that she is indeed Stephanie, with Leslie Thompkins having faked her death. Batman reveals his doubts about her death leading him to not erect a memorial for her in the Batcave. Since her secret identity had been compromised, Leslie faked her death so villains could not use her against Batman as Black Mask had done. Living with Leslie in Africa under an alias, Stephanie had been performing volunteer work until an attack from a local witch-hunting tribe prompted her to return to crimefighting, and subsequently to Gotham. Stephanie reunites with her mother, enrolls in Tim's high school, and rejoins the Bat-Family.

Before being revealed to Robin and Batman, Stephanie works freelance for the Penguin and gets information that helps him in his gang wars. She abruptly stops aiding him, after which he loses the advantage and leaves Gotham. She sends Penguin a note apologizing for leaving him when he needed her the most.

During the Batman R.I.P. storyline, Stephanie played the role of both ally and betrayer to Robin. Following Batman's disappearance and descent into madness, Robin attempts to balance his search for Bruce with his attempts to maintain control over Gotham's criminals. Tim asks that Stephanie help him locate Batman, but having anticipated his downfall, Batman has ordered Stephanie to hinder the investigation, believing that Tim needs to learn how to handle things on his own. Tim discovers the deception, and pulls away from his relationship with Stephanie. Unbeknownst to Tim, Batman has also ordered Stephanie to make Robin a stronger hero by challenging him, so Stephanie hires the Scarab, an assassin she encountered while she was Robin. After ordering the Scarab to use non-lethal methods, she also begins working with Tim's enemy, the General, who eventually tries to kill her. Her martial arts skills were able to save her from getting shot in the head—she is instead shot in the shoulder, escaping just in time to save Tim's life when the Scarab goes rogue.

The General, now using the identity of Anarky, decides to plunge Gotham into anarchy by starting a citywide gang war, and Stephanie aids Robin in keeping order and defeating the General. Afterward, Robin reveals that he is aware that Stephanie had worked with the villains to help him become a better Robin under Batman's orders. He notes that her actions were successful, but her methods were questionable. No longer in love with Stephanie, Robin orders her to abandon the Spoiler identity as he can no longer trust her.

In Batman and the Outsiders #13, Batgirl recruits Spoiler and Vigilante to a new network of heroes that will replace Batman, who is missing after the Batman R.I.P. storyline. She is able to turn completely invisible while fighting the Vigilante, though Fabian Nicieza, current writer of the Robin title, said he knew nothing about it. However, in Gotham Gazette: Batman Alive, Nicieza incorporates the new ability, with Robin stating she stole the technology to make herself invisible.

In Teen Titans #66, Stephanie appeared as one of the potential candidates to help fill Miss Martian's vacant seat on the team's roster. She was drawn into a fight with Bombshell, who mocked her and accused her of being a coward. In the end, Robin revealed that Stephanie had not come to join the Titans, but instead to help him with his preparations to leave the team.

In the Red Robin series, Stephanie and Dick Grayson (now, the new Batman, following Bruce Wayne's apparent death) become concerned about Tim after Dick transfers the mantle of Robin from Tim to Damian Wayne. Furious, Tim comes to believe that Bruce is still alive, and goes in search of him under the guise of Red Robin. When he cuts off all communication with the Bat-Family and the Teen Titans, Stephanie approaches Tim in his private base. This action, however, only infuriates Tim more. Kicking her in the chest after she sneaks up on him, he reiterates that he cannot trust her and orders her not to follow him on his mission, leading her to return to Gotham.

=== Batgirl ===
Stephanie Brown as Batgirl. Promotional art for Batgirl (vol. 3) #4 by Phil Noto.

Stephanie Brown graduates from high school off-panel, is a student at Gotham University, and is still living with her mother. Cassandra Cain has apparently become disillusioned following Bruce Wayne's apparent death and gives Stephanie her Batgirl costume. After operating as the new Batgirl in Cain's costume, Stephanie is confronted by Barbara Gordon who was notified of her activities by Dick Grayson. Barbara tried to reason with Stephanie to get her to stop being a vigilante, as she still saw Stephanie as an impetuous youth, remembering her role in causing a citywide gang war and her near-death experience at Black Mask's hands. However, a new type of recreational drug is hitting the streets of Gotham known as "Thrill", which they discover was manufactured by the Scarecrow and the second Black Mask, and the two women need each other to stop the drug trade. Stephanie eventually confronts and defeats the Scarecrow, impressing Barbara and proving that she now has the maturity and the responsibility to face her fears and failures. Barbara decides to allow Stephanie to continue on as Batgirl. Barbara later takes a job as an assistant professor at Stephanie's school to continue to keep in contact with her. Barbara also designs a costume for Stephanie to replace Cassandra's tattered costume, incorporating various elements of both the Spoiler and previous Batgirl costumes.

As Stephanie is taking steps to balance her double-life as a college student and a vigilante, Barbara makes a test run on Stephanie's Batsuit, which includes monitoring Stephanie's vital signs and allowing both women to communicate through wireless links. After some warm-up against minor criminals, Stephanie finds herself against Livewire who causes a blackout in the city while draining its power. Fortunately, Stephanie's costume is insulated, and she is able to overpower the villainess. Stephanie also develops an attraction to Gotham PD's newest young recruit who just transferred from Coast City PD, Detective Nicholas "St. Nick" Gage, who is also attracted to her as Batgirl. However, this budding romance is complicated by Commissioner Gordon, who is trying to set the young detective up on a blind date with Barbara. The Commissioner finds their mutual attraction unsettling, because despite the fact that Batgirl's identity is yet unknown to him, Gordon knows that the superheroine is still a teenager. Her activities also lead her and Barbara into conflict with the new Dynamic Duo, Batman (Dick Grayson) and Robin (Damian Wayne). However, even though Stephanie and Damian initially do not get along, he is intrigued by her motivations to be a vigilante.

While meeting a classmate, Francisco, Stephanie is left unconscious after being shot while trying to protect him from a group of kidnappers. Stephanie survives the gunshot wound and it is later revealed that Francisco's real name is Fernando Garcia, a son of a real estate mogul whose father's unethical business practices have led to him becoming a target. Because of Garcia's abduction, Stephanie and Barbara join forces with Batman and Robin, as some of the Gotham rogues are involved in the crime, including Roulette. After they rescue Garcia, Dick, after seeing Stephanie's fight with Roxy Rocket, although still not completely approving of her as Batgirl, realizes that she reminds him of Barbara when she was in the role, so he allows Barbara to continue training Stephanie. Stephanie also receives a new state-of-the-art transportation known as the Ricochet (based from Batman's Batcycle designs) from Barbara.

Stephanie was later asked by Barbara to shut down the vigilante operations of John Raymond, a wealthy young superhero who had been giving powerful exo-suits to a number of people in hopes of creating a nationwide army of crime-fighters he dubbed "Web Hosts". After being convinced by John that he could keep his Web Hosts in line, Stephanie and Barbara agreed to not only allow him to continue his vigilante actions, but also upgrade the equipment he was using.

In the first part of the Red Robin/Batgirl crossover story "Collision", Tim Drake returns to Gotham with proof that Bruce Wayne is not only still alive but also lost in time. At the same time, immortal terrorist Ra's al Ghul begins his attack to destroy everything the Wayne family has built, in response to Tim crippling his League of Assassins organization during his quest. Tim returns to the Batcave to seek the current Batman's aid, only to find Stephanie as Batgirl. After their confrontation, Stephanie and Tim reluctantly work together to protect Ra's al Ghul's possible targets. After saving Leslie Thompkins from the League, Tim attempts to rekindle his and Stephanie's old romance. She rejects these advances before Prudence, another member of Ra's al Ghul's men, interrupts them with her assignment to target the new Batgirl. Stephanie, however, bests the assassin in combat. Prudence subsequently reveals her true allegiance to Tim, which outweighs her supposed loyalty to The Demon's Head. After narrowly escaping Tim's safehouse (which the League of Assassins had booby-trapped before the three arrived), they encounter members of another organization of assassins, the Council of Spiders. The League of Assassins are eventually defeated after Tim thwarts Ra's al Ghul's plan strategically with Bruce Wayne's will that was made before his disappearance.

After Bruce Wayne's return, it is revealed that the true reason Cassandra Cain handed over her Batgirl mantle to Stephanie was that she was acting under her mentor's order in the event of his death or disappearance. Around this time, during The Lesson arc, Stephanie is forced to deal with a mysterious group known as The Order of the Scythe, which briefly frames her for murdering a student on her campus.

During her final adventure of the Batgirl series, Stephanie confronts her father and is ensnared by a sample of Black Mercy. Stephanie experiences a number of future events, including a time-travelling adventure with Cassandra and Barbara, the Royal Flush Gang attacking her at her college graduation, and eventually training the new Batgirl, a girl named Nell. She ultimately breaks free from the Black Mercy and confides in Barbara that despite the wonderful things she experienced while in the fantasy world, she preferred to live in the here and now. Stephanie was later tasked to infiltrate Saint Hadrian's Finishing School for Girls as a student in Batman Incorporated.

During the Convergence storyline, Stephanie (who still uses the Batgirl title) is chosen as the champion of her version of Gotham City, and must fight other city's champions if they are to survive.

=== The New 52 ===
In the New 52, a 2011 reboot of the DC Universe, Stephanie Brown's history was completely removed from continuity. She makes her first appearance in the new mainstream continuity as Spoiler in Batman (vol. 2) #28 (April 2014), a sneak peek into the future of the Batman Eternal series; she is seen tied up in a vault by Selina Kyle, with Kyle stating she is the only one who knows how to stop what is coming next for Gotham. In Batman Eternal #3, Stephanie is reintroduced as a purple-clad teen who stumbles into a meeting between her father, the Cluemaster, and his criminal associates (Signalman, Lock-Up, Firefly, and a shadowy figure). She manages to escape death at her father's hands and, over the course of the series, works to "spoil" Cluemaster's plans by becoming a vigilante, calling herself the "Spoiler." At first, she merely attempts to spread news of the Cluemaster's plans on the internet, then works actively as a costumed crimefighter to capture and foil him.

Stephanie's efforts to expose the Cluemaster go awry, however, when she is instead targeted for assassination with a $100 million bounty on her head. She is eventually captured by Selina Kyle, who releases her into the custody of Batman and Harper Row. At a safehouse, Stephanie refuses to tell Harper what she knows; she reveals that she does not trust Batman because she believes she saw Bruce Wayne plotting with her father, and blames Wayne and Batman for the rise of criminals like Cluemaster in Gotham City. During the series' climax, Stephanie's father is revealed as one of the masterminds of an elaborate conspiracy against Batman, but is seemingly murdered by his true co-conspirator Lincoln March. Stephanie overcomes her doubts about herself and Batman in time to save Batman from March, and later moves in with Harper and her brother Cullen.

Following the Batman Eternal storyline, Brown as Spoiler helps other teens fight the Joker's chaos in Detective Comics: Endgame, and seeks training from Selina Kyle and Eiko Hasigawa in Catwoman. In the aftermath of a gang war in Catwoman, Barbara Gordon takes Stephanie under her wing in Batgirl and enlists her help to fight the Fugue, a memory-altering supervillain. Stephanie also appears as Spoiler fighting the supervillain Mother alongside the Robins in Batman and Robin Eternal, during which she eventually befriends Cassandra Cain.

=== DC Rebirth ===
In DC Rebirth, the 2016 relaunch of DC Comics, Stephanie is recruited into Batman's emergency response team headed by Batwoman, along with Red Robin, Cassandra Cain (now using the name Orphan), and Clayface. After Red Robin is "killed" by Jacob Kane's Colony drones, Stephanie becomes depressed and questions her purpose and the world she wants to live in, in the "Victim Syndicate" storyline. The story ends with her challenging the rest of the team and threatening to expose their secret identities if they don't give up their vigilantism. After disarming her by refusing her offer, she leaves the team and tells Batman that until he gives up his cowl, she'll be standing in his way. Stephanie actively opposes Batman and his allies in the field, while still fighting criminals like Wrath. It also appears that she is falling under the influence of Anarky, who is attempting to build an underground society of people who were impacted by Batman's activities. Eventually, Stephanie sees through Anarky's lies and helps Batman apprehend him. However, she walks away from Batman before he can tell her that Tim Drake is still alive.

After Tim reveals that he is alive, Stephanie briefly rejoins the team to help them stop the Victim Syndicate, but leaves again after the death of Clayface. She also breaks up with Tim because he was consistently dishonest about his intent to remain Red Robin instead of attending Ivy University. When the General infects Tim with OMAC nanites and threatens to control Gotham, Batman and Cassandra ask Stephanie for help, and she reluctantly agrees. Using her drones, she leads an infiltration into the General's Belfry 2.0 stronghold, and hacks into the system to shut it down. The evil AI Brother Eye confronts her with images of her past in the alternate timeline from which Batman (Tim Drake from the future) appeared, mocking her as "lesser" than a timeline where she was both Robin and Batgirl. Instead of being cast down, Stephanie laughs and cracks into the timeline history that Brother Eye and the General have been using to manipulate Tim, showing him the truth and convincing him to destroy the OMACs himself. After the dust settles, Tim decides to investigate the divergence in timelines Stephanie discovered, and she joins him in his quest.

=== Batgirl trio ===
During The Joker War, Stephanie and Cassandra fight the Hench Master in Bludhaven. At the end of the story, both she and Stephanie reclaim their Bat symbols. Stephanie receives a new costume, which is an amalgamation of her Spoiler outfit and her previous Batgirl suit.

In Infinite Frontier, Barbara Gordon – now primarily operating as Oracle again – explains to Huntress that Stephanie and Cassandra now share the Batgirl title, but that she reserves the right to occasionally suit up as Batgirl in future. In Batman: Urban Legends (in which she is referred to as both Batgirl and Spoiler), it is revealed she and Tim broke up and are not speaking, although she is supportive when he comes out as bisexual and starts dating Bernard Dowd.

During the Fear State crossover, the Batgirls are falsely accused of being a terrorist cell and targeted by the Magistrate and a hacker called "the Seer," resulting in the destruction of their Clocktower base. In the subsequent 2022 Batgirls series written by Becky Cloonan and Michael W. Conrad, Stephanie, Cassandra, and Barbara take up residence in The Hill, one of Gotham's poorer neighborhoods, after becoming fugitives. Stephanie and Cassandra acquire a new vehicle, a muscle car they name Bondo. Together, the trio face various threats including the Saints (a residual group of loyalists to Fear State's Simon Saint), Tutor (a graffiti artist using Scarecrow's fear gas to control minds), and Spellbinder (a former Arkham Asylum doctor similarly using hypnotic fear gas-infused paint). The Batgirls destroy the Seer's equipment while pursuing the Saints, then investigate a serial killer calling himself "Mr. Fun," encountering Killer Moth and the Riddler in the process. Stephanie also begins a flirtation with Kyle Mizoguchi (of Gotham Academy).

After accidentally swapping bodies with Cassandra, Stephanie is abducted by her father, the Cluemaster. Arthur is revealed to have survived Lincoln March's attempt on his life in Batman Eternal, which he credits to the Mad Hatter. Cluemaster subjects Stephanie to electric shocks to force her to play a version of his old game show, but she refuses. Cassandra arrives and rescues Stephanie, and in the ensuing battle, Cluemaster shoots Stephanie while aiming for Cassandra. Stephanie temporarily dies, but is resurrected with a few drops of Lazarus pit serum, which Cassandra had previously stolen from the League of Assassins. Cluemaster is incarcerated in Arkham Tower, where he swears off clues.

The Batgirls pursue the Hatter, who gasses Stephanie and causes her to turn into a man-bat; still, Cassandra is able to communicate with Stephanie through her animalistic transformation, and the two defeat the Hatter before reverting Stephanie to her human body. When the team tracks down two snipers causing panic in The Hill, Stephanie dissuades local news reporter Grace O'Halloran from killing one of them. Stephanie then remains with Cassandra in The Hill for some time after Barbara moves back into the repaired Clocktower. She later appears in the 2026 Batgirl storyline "Curse of the Blood" in a minor role.

In the Bad Seeds crossover, Stephanie is sent to investigate plant growth in a Gotham subway tunnel, fighting Victor Zsasz and freeing Anarky from a carnivorous flower. She is knocked unconscious in an explosion that destroys the tunnel (on the orders of police commissioner Vandal Savage), and Anarky leaves her for dead. Stephanie is later taken to Gotham General Hospital.

Following the events of Bad Seeds, Stephanie resurfaces in the Gangs of Gotham miniseries using a new alias, "Clu," to infiltrate the Street Demons biker gang.

=== New Titans ===
In New Titans, Stephanie is recruited by Victor Stone to join a new incarnation of the Titans after Stone's Cyborg side goes rogue and imprisons the previous team. During an unexpected encounter with the demon Nebiros in Happy Harbor, she assumes the role of field leader for the new group, which initially consists of Red Devil, Yara Flor, Jon Kent, and the enigmatic android Eva.

== Powers and abilities ==
Like most of the Batman family, Stephanie Brown has no superhuman powers. She has been trained extensively by Oracle, Batgirl, Batman, and the Birds of Prey in martial arts, acrobatics, strength training, interrogation, engineering, computer operation and detective work. She's spontaneous, inventive and quick on her feet, known for her creative solutions and 'leap before you look' attitude in her vigilante work. Bruce Wayne likens her mobility, wit and determination to that of fellow ex-Robin Dick Grayson. She has a strong intuition when it comes to people and is able to get across to and bond with many different kinds of people. Although not a martial artist of the caliber of Cassandra Cain, she is an expert in her own right; an unpredictable fighter and a match for Tim Drake. She carries a belt similar to that used by other Gotham vigilantes containing a grappling hook, tracking devices, and various other crime-fighting paraphernalia. During Gotham Underground, the Penguin gave her an unknown device that allowed her to become completely invisible. According to Tim Drake, this "ability" was achieved through stolen technology. According to Batgirl writer Bryan Q. Miller, the ability to become invisible has not been incorporated into Stephanie's Batgirl costume.

After Stephanie took on the Batgirl identity, Barbara Gordon designed a new costume for Stephanie more in line with the rest of the Bat-family's. It is equipped with kevlar and carbon fiber-reinforced polymer to protect against ballistic, flame, and electrical attacks. Stephanie's Batsuit also carries a wireless relay within the cowl, permitting her to remain in contact with Barbara. The suit also allows Barbara to monitor Stephanie's vital signs. Stephanie now also uses a collapsible bo staff, similar to the one that Tim Drake uses. It is implied that she had been trained by Cassandra Cain in using it before assuming the Batgirl mantle.

== Other versions ==
- An alternate universe version of Stephanie Brown appears in World Without Young Justice.
- Stephanie Brown appears in Tiny Titans.
- An alternate universe version of Stephanie Brown appears in The New 52: Futures End.
- An alternate universe version of Stephanie Brown from Earth-Three appears in Young Justice (2019).
- An alternate universe version of Stephanie Brown appears in Future State.
- An alternate universe version of Stephanie Brown appears in the DCeased tie-in DCeased: Hope at World's End #1.

== In other media ==
=== Television ===
- Stephanie Brown as Spoiler appears in Young Justice, voiced by Mae Whitman. This version is a member of the Team who temporarily left the group to counter United Nations secretary general Lex Luthor's restrictions on the Justice League.
- Stephanie Brown appears in the Batwoman episode "I'll Give You a Clue", portrayed by Morgan Kohan. This version is a redhead and technological genius who develops an interest in Luke Fox.
- Stephanie Brown appears in a photograph in the Titans episode "Barbara Gordon" as one of Bruce Wayne's potential Robin candidates following the death of Jason Todd.
- Stephanie Brown appears in Gotham Knights, portrayed by Anna Lore. This version is the best friend of Bruce Wayne's adoptive son Turner Hayes who initially develops a rivalry, later romantic relationship, with Harper Row.
- Stephanie Brown as Spoiler appears in the Kite Man: Hell Yeah! episode "Pilot, Hell Yeah!", voiced by Stephanie Hsu.
- Stephanie Brown appears in the Batman: Caped Crusader episode "Nocturne", voiced by Amari McCoy. This version is an orphan under Leslie Thompkins' care.

=== Video games ===
- Stephanie Brown as Spoiler appears as a unlockable playable character in the Nintendo DS version of Lego Batman: The Videogame.
- Stephanie Brown as Spoiler, Batgirl, and Robin appears as a character summon in Scribblenauts Unmasked: A DC Comics Adventure.
- Stephanie Brown as Spoiler appears as a DLC character in Lego Batman 3: Beyond Gotham.
- Stephanie Brown as Spoiler appears as an unlockable character in DC Legends.

=== Miscellaneous ===
- Two incarnations of Stephanie Brown appear in All-New Batman: The Brave and the Bold #13. The Phantom Stranger summons her as Robin, among other Robins, to help Batman while Madame Xanadu shows him a team of Batgirls, with Brown as a member.
- The Batwoman incarnation of Stephanie Brown appears in the tie-in comic Earth-Prime: Batwoman #1.

== Collected editions ==
Stephanie Brown as Spoiler/Robin:

Title	Material collected	Publication date	ISBN
Robin: Flying Solo	Robin Vol. 4 #3–5	July 2000	978-1563896095
Batman: No Man's Land (Modern Edition) Vol. 3	Robin Vol. 4 #68–69; #71–72	August 2012	978-1401234560
Batman Black and White Volume 3 (B&W)	Batman: Gotham Knights Vol. 1 #22; #37	September 2008	978-1401213541
Green Arrow: Quiver	Green Arrow Vol. 3 #5	April 2015	978-1401259426
Batgirl: Death Wish	Batgirl Vol. 1 #20	August 2003	978-1840237078
Batgirl: Fists of Fury	Batgirl Vol. 1 #21, #26–28	May 2004	978-1401202057
Batman: Bruce Wayne: Murderer?	Robin Vol. 4 #98–99; Birds of Prey Vol. 1 #39–40	March 2014	978-1401246839
Batman: Bruce Wayne: Fugitive	Birds of Prey Vol. 1 #43	July 2014	978-1401246822
Teen Titans Vol. 3: Beast Boys and Girls	Teen Titans Vol. 3 #13	Juin 2005	978-1401204594
Robin: Unmasked!	Robin Vol. 4 #122–125	April 2009	978-1435270466
Batman: War Drums	Detective Comics Vol. 1 #796; Robin Vol. 4 #126–128	October 2004	978-1401203412
Batman: War Games Book 1	Catwoman Vol. 3 #34;	March 2005	978-1401204297
Batman: War Games Book 2	Robin Vol. 4 #130; Batman: Gotham Knights Vol. 1 #57; Catwoman Vol. 3 #35; Nightwing Vol. 2 #97	July 2005	978-1401204303
Batman: War Games Book 3	Robin Vol. 4 #131; Batman Vol. 1 #633–634; Batman: Gotham Knights Vol. 1 #58; Catwoman Vol. 3 #36; Nightwing Vol. 2 #98	October 2005	978-1401204310
Robin/Batgirl: Fresh Blood	Robin Vol. 4 #132	October 2005	978-1401204334
Batman: Under the hood	Batman Vol. 1 #635	November 2005	978-1401207564
Robin: To Kill a Bird	Robin Vol. 4 #134	April 2006	978-1401209094
Batman: City of Crime	Detective Comics Vol. 1 #800;	July 2006	978-1401208974
Batman: War Crimes	Detective Comics Vol. 1 #809;	February 2006	978-1401209032
Batgirl: Kicking Assassins	Batgirl Vol. 1 #60–64	January 2006	978-1401204396
52 Omnibus	52 Vol. 1 #8	November 2012	978-1401235567
Robin: Teenage Wasteland	Robin Vol. 4 #156;	November 2007	978-1401214807
Gotham Underground	Gotham Underground Vol. 1 #1–9;	April 2009	978-8467474169
Robin: Violent Tendencies	Robin Vol. 4 #172–174; Robin/Spoiler Special #1	December 2008	978-1401219888
Robin: Search for a Hero	Robin Vol. 4 #175–183;	August 2009	978-1401223106
Teen Titans Vol. 3: Changing of the Guard	Teen Titans Vol. 3 #66;	August 2009	978-1401223090
Batman: Life After Death	Batman Vol. 1 #697;	October 2011	978-1401229757
Red Robin: The Grail	Red Robin Vol. 1 #2;	May 2010	978-1401226190
Red Robin: Collision	Red Robin Vol. 1 #9–12;	September 2010	978-1401228835
Justice Societe of America Vol. 8: Axis of Evil	Justice Society of America Vol. 3 #39;	December 2010	978-1401229016
Red Robin: Hit List	Red Robin Vol. 1 #15;	July 2011	978-1401231651
Red Robin: 7 Days of Death	Red Robin Vol. 1 #20;	March 2012	978-1401233648
Wonder Woman: Odyssey, Vol. 1	Wonder Woman Vol. 3 #600;	July 2012	978-1401230784
Batman Incorporated	Batman, Incorporated Vol. 1 #1–8;	January 2013	978-1401238278
Futures End: Five Years Later Omnibus	Batgirl Future's End; Batman Future's End; Catwoman Future's End	December 2014	978-1401251291
Batman Eternal Vol. 1	Batman Eternal Vol. 1 #3–4; #8; #10–11; #13; #20	December 2014	978-1401251734
Batman Eternal Vol. 2	Batman Eternal Vol. 1 #24; #26–27; #31–32	July 2015	978-1401252311
Batman Eternal Vol. 3	Batman Eternal Vol. 1 #41–45; #47–49; #51–52	October 2015	

Issues not collected into TPB/HC format:

Detective Comics Vol. 1 #647–649

Robin Vol 4: #15–16; #25–26; #35; #40–41; #43–45; #50; #54; #56–62; #64–65; #74–75; #80; #82–84; #87–88; #92–95; #100–105; #107–113; #116; #119–120

Batgirl Vol. 1 #31–32; #38; #53–55

Young Justice Vol. 1 #30; #49–51; #54

Batman Vol. 1 #713

Nightwing Vol. 2 #75

Batman and the outsiders Vol 2 #13

Supergirl Vol. 4 #60

Convergence Vol. 1 #1

Convergence Batgirl Vol. 1 #1

Detective Comics: Endgame Vol. 1 #1

Stephanie Brown as Batgirl:

Title	Material collected	Publication date	ISBN
Batgirl Vol. 1: Batgirl Rising	Batgirl Vol. 3 #1–7	June 2011	978-1401227234
Batgirl Vol. 2: The Flood	Batgirl Vol. 3 #8–14, Red Robin #10	May 2011	978-1401231422
World's Finest	World's Finest Vol. 4 #1–4	June 2010	978-1401227975
Batgirl Vol. 3: The Lesson	Batgirl Vol. 3 #15–24	November 2011	978-1401232702
Batgirls Vol. 1	Batgirls Vol. 1 #1–19	February 2022	978-1779519528
Batgirls 2022 Annual	Batgirls 2022 Annual #1	January 2023	

== See also ==
Character lists

- List of Batman supporting characters

Concepts and themes

- Girl Heroes
- Girl Power
- Portrayal of women in comics
- Women warriors in literature and culture
- Women in Refrigerators
