= Cassandra Cain =

DC comics superheroine

- Cassandra Cain as Batgirl in the cover of Batgirl (2024) #7. Art by Dan Mora.

Publication information
- Publisher: DC Comics
- First appearance: As Cassandra Cain: Batman #567 (July 1999); As Batgirl: Batman: Legends of the Dark Knight #120 (August 1999); As Kasumi: Justice League Elite #1 (September 2004); As Black Bat: Batman Incorporated #6 (May 2011); As Orphan: Batman & Robin Eternal #26 (March 2016)
- Created by: Kelley Puckett; Damion Scott

In-story information
- Alter ego: Cassandra Cain
- Species: Human
- Team affiliations: Batman Family; League of Assassins; Titans East; Outsiders; Batman Incorporated; Birds of Prey
- Partnerships: Batman; Stephanie Brown; Barbara Gordon; Jade Tiger; Tim Drake; Duke Thomas; Jason Todd; Dick Grayson
- Supporting character of: Batman
- Notable aliases: Batgirl; Kasumi; Black Bat; Orphan; Destruction's Daughter; One Who Is All; Zhe Lou Kogane
- Abilities: Master martial artist and hand-to-hand combatant; Peak physical of human conditioning; Able to read body language and anticipate opponents' actions

Altered in-story information for adaptations to other media
- Alter ego: Cassandra Wu-San

Cassandra Cain is a superheroine appearing in American comic books published by DC Comics. Created by Kelley Puckett and Damion Scott, Cassandra Cain first appeared in Batman #567 (July 1999). Commonly associated with the superhero Batman, Cassandra is one of the several characters who has assumed the role of Batgirl. Over the years, she has also assumed the names of Black Bat and Orphan. Originally the first character to star in an ongoing Batgirl comic book series, she is later replaced by Stephanie Brown in 2009. Later absent following the New 52 reboot, she later was brought back in Batman & Robin Eternal (using the code name Orphan) with a new background until her full history was restored in 2021 following the Infinite Frontier relaunch.

Cassandra is the daughter of world-class assassins David Cain and Lady Shiva. She was abused and raised by David in an unusual conditioning by depriving her of speech and human contact during her childhood, supplementing combative arts and violence as her first form of communication in an effort to create a world-class fighter, assassin, and successor. While initially mute and illiterate as a result, she was an exceptional martial artist with an uncanny ability of interpreting body language efficiently. Following an encounter with Barbara Gordon and Batman, both would eventually teach her lost skills when the latter takes her under his tutelage due to her abilities and bravery and becomes a superhero within the Batman Family, and one of the world's most capable martial artists, and among Batman's adoptive children. Primarily affiliated with the Batman family, the character has also been a member other superhero teams such as the Outsiders and Birds of Prey.

Since her debut, she is considered one of the most compelling characters in Batman's fictional universe. A fan-favorite character, Cassandra is often viewed as a positive in Asian representation within superhero comics. The character would make her cinematic debut in the DC Extended Universe film Birds of Prey, portrayed by Ella Jay Basco. She would also make several animated appearances such as in Young Justice and Batwheels, the former renaming her Cassandra Wu-San.

== Publication history ==
Cassandra Cain first appeared in Batman #567 (July 1999), written by Kelley Puckett and penciled by Damion Scott (who are generally credited with her invention).

In 2000, Cassandra became the first Batgirl to be featured in an eponymous ongoing comic book series.

During the "War Games" story arc in 2004, Batman relies heavily on Cassandra to help control the violence of the gang war in Gotham City.

Cassandra took on the role of a villain by becoming the head of the League of Assassins following the "One Year Later" continuity jump, as established in Robin #150 (July 2006).

Cassandra then appears in Supergirl (vol. 5) #14 (April 2007), battling the title character, (Kara Zor-El).

In Teen Titans (vol. 3) #44 (April 2007), it was revealed that Cassandra battled Supergirl first, before attacking the Teen Titans with the Titans East.

Cassandra reappears later in the Robin series.

Cassandra next appears on the roster of Titans East once again wearing the Batgirl costume. Cassandra remained in the role of a villain, under the command of Titans East's leader, Deathstroke.

In October 2007, DC announced that Cassandra would be taking up the Batgirl identity as a member of the Outsiders in the upcoming Batman and the Outsiders ongoing series to be written by Chuck Dixon, which appears to, or is hoped to, begin resolving the controversy.

In February 2008, Dan DiDio revealed during a convention panel that writer Adam Beechen would be writing a "new Batgirl" miniseries. Beechen himself said that the story would resolve the questions over Cassandra's behavior and will be a setup for new Batgirl adventures.

In 2009, Cassandra passes the Batgirl identity to Stephanie Brown.

In July 2010, Cassandra appeared as one of the main characters in a short story written and drawn by Amanda Conner for Wonder Woman #600, where she helps Wonder Woman and Power Girl in a battle against Egg Fu.

After Bruce Wayne returns, it is revealed that Cassandra's disillusionment was a ruse, and that she had willingly handed over her Batgirl mantle to Stephanie because she was acting under her mentor's orders, and she is now working as a codename-less vigilante.

In 2011, in Grant Morrison's Batman Inc. series, it is revealed that Cassandra had taken up the name Black Bat.

At C2E2 2011, it was confirmed that Cassandra would be appearing as a main character in Scott Snyder and Kyle Higgins' mini-series Batman: Gates of Gotham.

After the New 52, Cassandra appeared in what appeared to be a variant timeline; however, at San Diego Comic-Con in 2015, James Tynion IV announced that Cassandra would be introduced into mainstream continuity in Batman & Robin Eternal.

February 4, 2020 was the debut of Cassandra Cain's first graphic novel, Shadow of the Batgirl, written by Sarah Kuhn and illustrated by Nicole Goux.

After being reestablished as Batgirl (and sharing the moniker with Stephanie Brown) during the Joker War crossover, Cassandra appeared as a main character in the ongoing Batgirls series until its cancellation in 2023. In 2024, DC Comics launched a new Batgirl ongoing series starring Cassandra written by Tate Brombal, part of the DC All In initiative.

== Fictional character biography ==
=== Early history ===
Cassandra's birth and childhood are revealed in the Batgirl series. While seeking a perfect bodyguard for Ra's al Ghul, David Cain finds a potential mother when he sees Sandra Wu-San fighting her sister Carolyn in a martial arts tournament. Believing that Sandra is holding back for Carolyn, Cain murders Carolyn and lures Sandra into a trap, sparing her life in exchange for giving birth to his child and leaving that child for him to raise. She agrees. After the birth of Cassandra, Sandra sets out to become Lady Shiva.

Cain trains Cassandra from birth to be an assassin. She is not taught to read or write; instead, reading body language is her only language. She is able to read people's movements and predict what they are going to do. When she is eight, Cain takes her to kill a businessman. As the man dies, Cassandra reads what he is feeling, realizes what she did, and runs away from her father.

After that, her activities are a mystery, until she first appears during the "No Man's Land" story arc.

=== No Man's Land ===
During the "No Man's Land" storyline, after Gotham is leveled by an earthquake and isolated, Cassandra Cain saves Commissioner Gordon's life and gains Bruce Wayne's approval, and, eventually, becomes the new Batgirl.

Her father, David Cain, sends a video of Cassandra's first murder to Bruce Wayne (Batman) attempting to disrupt her status. However, Wayne continues to accept Cassandra after she takes several bullets to save the life of a hired assassin, proving her devotion to protecting human life.

=== Batgirl ===
Cassandra Cain as depicted on the cover of Batgirl#1 (February, 2000) Art by Damion Scott.

Bruce Wayne sends Cassandra to Barbara Gordon, currently functioning as Oracle. Barbara says she prefers to live alone but since Cassandra is never home and does not talk, it is just like living alone. A telepath "rewires" Cassandra's brain so that she can think with words and use language, but these abilities come at some cost to her ability to read people's body language. As she had relied completely on this ability to fight, she is unable to effectively fight crime. Worried, Bruce Wayne takes away her costume and begins training her in defensive skills.

Cassandra soon discovers that the assassin Lady Shiva can read people like she used to be able to and asks Shiva to reteach her. Lady Shiva accepts on the condition that they would have a duel to the death a year later. As Cassandra would rather be "perfect for a year" instead of "mediocre for a lifetime", she accepts the offer. When the women fight in a year's time, Cassandra dies within minutes. Shiva then restarts her heart, realizing Cassandra had a death wish, so that they can have a real fight. In the subsequent fight, Cassandra beats Shiva but does not kill her.

Though not known for her private life, Cassandra does have a one-time romance with Conner Kent after meeting him on a cruise ship. He shares her first kiss, and she even visits him at his home in Smallville, though the relationship never becomes serious.

Cassandra then helps Batman control the violence of a gang war in Gotham City.

Later, Batgirl moves to Blüdhaven with Tim Drake (the third Robin) at Batman's suggestion and with his financial support. There, Deathstroke takes on a contract from the Penguin to kill Batgirl and decides to let his daughter Rose (the current Ravager), do the job instead. Cassandra beats Rose by playing on her emotions to leave her open for a critical strike, giving Deathstroke no choice but to get her medical attention.

During this time, Cassandra starts developing a friendship with Brenda, the woman who owns the local coffee shop, and even a very short-lived relationship with a boy named Zero. Unfortunately, her friends are all killed in the Blüdhaven disaster.

Cassandra also goes undercover for Batman, as Kasumi, in the Justice League Elite, working under Vera Black to track and eliminate metahuman threats to the population. She works with the Batman's old fellow Justice League members Green Arrow and the Flash, and forms a bond with Coldcast, who is the first Leaguer to whom she reveals her identity. Although he is subsequently accused of murder, she and the rest of the team soon realize that he has been manipulated by renegade Elite member Menagerie, who was himself being manipulated by the spirit of Manchester Black as he tried to drive his sister to destroy London. As the JLA falls, the Elite, united by the spirit of Manitou Raven, free Vera and vanquish Black, although the team disbands after this last mission.

Cassandra gathers evidence that indicates that Shiva could be her mother, and seeks her out to confirm this, rejoining the League of Assassins. After she is proclaimed by Nyssa al Ghul as the "One Who Is All", the students of the League are split, half following Shiva, and the others Cassandra. In the following confrontation, Cassandra is mortally wounded by her "adoptive brother", the Mad Dog, while heroically saving one of the students under her leadership. Shiva revives Cassandra in a Lazarus Pit, then answers Cassandra's questions about her parentage. When Cassandra asked Shiva whether she was still killing, whether she would ever stop, Shiva says she was, and responds, "It's why I had you", so Cassandra agrees to fight her to the death once more.

After a closely matched battle, Cassandra manages to break Shiva's neck, paralyzing her. She appears ready to place Shiva in the Lazarus Pit, but Shiva pleads with her not to do so. Instead, Cassandra impales Shiva on a hook hanging over the pit, apparently killing her. Cassandra then abandons the identity of Batgirl and returns to her life as a wanderer.

=== One Year Later ===
Robin (Tim Drake) captures David Cain and brings him to the League of Assassins as ransom to free Cassandra, only to find that Cassandra is the new leader. Cassandra produces a gun and tells him to shoot Cain and join her league. Upon his refusal, she shoots Cain herself. Tim and Cassandra engage in a fight which ends when the platform they are fighting on explodes. By the time Tim comes back to the original location, Cassandra and Cain are gone and the ninjas' necks have been snapped. Tim had secretly recorded the conversation, clearing his name, but branding Cassandra as a murderer at the same time.

==== Brief Appearances ====
Cassandra next surfaces when she is hired by Dark Angel to kill Supergirl and attempts to do so by kidnapping Supergirl's friend, Captain Boomerang. Supergirl arrives at the League's Tibetan headquarters to confront Cassandra, where they fight. Cassandra uses swords that emit red sun energy which strips away Supergirl's powers. However, as Cassandra prepares to kill her, Supergirl mysteriously extrudes crystals from her body which injure Cassandra.

Later, Cassandra approaches Dodge, a wannabe superhero with teleportation powers, wanting him to steal a drug that gives humans metahuman strength in exchange for money. Cassandra (with an ally) plans to use the drug to create an army. She also makes another appearance where she murders the businessman who was producing that drug, who Robin has previously unsuccessfully attempted to bring to justice.

==== Teen Titans ====
Cassandra is left behind while Batman, Robin, and Nightwing leave for their year-long trip and Harvey Dent is charged with protecting Gotham instead of her. Deathstroke approaches Cassandra and preys on her desire for a loving father as well as her feelings of abandonment. Apparently, Deathstroke manages to inject Cassandra with drugs, from a distance, that warped her mind allowing for him to manipulate her to his liking.

Having gained control of his daughter, Deathstroke recruits her into Titans East, where she resumes the role and costume of Batgirl.

As a member of Titans East, she has a rematch with the Ravager and a brief confrontation with Robin, after which Robin injects Cassandra with a counter-serum (prepared in case Deathstroke regains control of his daughter), and she is apparently freed from Deathstroke's control and vows to kill Deathstroke to revenge herself.

However, some time later, when she is working with the Teen Titans, Miss Martian comments that she is more in control of herself now. She faces Deathstroke, Match, and other former Titans East teammates, before being subdued by Risk. Soon after, Cyborg, Raven, and Duela Dent summon former Titans Nightwing, Donna Troy, Beast Boy, and the Flash (Bart Allen), who join them against Deathstroke's team. Batgirl attempts to kill Deathstroke, but is stopped and knocked unconscious by Nightwing, who demands that Deathstroke face the courts. However, Deathstroke escapes from the Titans with the help of Inertia, and after the battle is over, Batgirl and Duela Dent both vanish without a word.

=== Batman and the Outsiders ===
Cassandra retakes the Batgirl mantle to join the Outsiders at Batman's request. She moves into the team's apartment, but does not show much desire to socialize with her teammates. Batman also offers membership to Green Arrow, who is furious to learn that the former leader of the League of Assassins is on the team as well. While on a mission, Green Arrow and Batgirl battle one another and end up gaining an unusual sort of respect for each other. The team as a whole begins to slowly accept Batgirl into their ranks after she frees all of them from the Chinese military.

After the loss of their leader in the 2008 "Batman R.I.P." storyline, the Outsiders are left in disarray. Cassandra, believing that Batman brought her onto the team for just such a contingency, takes command of the group. Together, they undertake a search for the Batman.

=== Batgirl (2008) ===
After Batman is found, Cassandra moves into Wayne Manor, on the trail of her father and Deathstroke. She uses the Batcave's computer to locate them but is attacked by Nightwing, who claims she cannot be trusted. Robin and Batman give her the benefit of the doubt.

Due to her research, Cassandra learns that David Cain and Deathstroke started up a school training Cassandra's "sisters". When Cassandra hears that the school's purpose was to "cripple the meta-hero community", she believes Oracle is about to be assassinated and rushes to her base of operations. She locates her father on a rooftop and engages in a one-on-one fight, eventually sending him over a ledge. When he loses his grip, she tries to save him but fails; he falls to another part of the rooftop. Batman, who had followed her, accepts her into the family again and says he will adopt her and make her his daughter.

However, after Bruce Wayne's apparent death, Cassandra, apparently disillusioned, passes the cowl to her close friend, Stephanie Brown, then she leaves Gotham.

=== Black Bat ===
Cassandra as Black Bat with Red Robin; art by Marcus To.

After Bruce Wayne returns, it is revealed that Cassandra's disillusionment was a ruse, and that she has willingly handed over her Batgirl mantle to Stephanie because she was acting under her mentor's orders in the event of his death or disappearance, and gone undercover, using Tim Drake as a regular contact. Following Bruce Wayne's public announcement about his intention to create a global team of Batmen, Tim visits Cassandra in Hong Kong, where she has been acting as an codename-less vigilante. He attempts to persuade Cassandra to return to Gotham now that things have returned to normal, but she refuses, saying that Stephanie needs the Batgirl role more than she does. Just before departing, Tim gives Cassandra a copy of her old costume and tells her that if she chooses to stay and fight crime in Hong Kong, he hopes she will do it while wearing a Bat-symbol.

Cassandra takes Tim up on his offer, and joined up with Bruce's new group, now wearing a heavily modified costume that uses her original outfit as a base. She now uses the name of Black Bat, and among other activities brings down a heroin-smuggling operation in Hong Kong.

After a new supervillain named the Architect destroys three Gotham bridges with the help of explosives smuggled from Hong Kong, resulting in the deaths of dozens of civilians. Cassandra, feeling guilty over her failure to stop the explosives from leaving China, returns to Gotham and partners with Red Robin, Dick Grayson, and Damian Wayne (the newest Robin) to bring the Architect to justice. During a stakeout at Oswald Cobblepot's nightclub, Cassandra is mocked and berated by Damian, who tells her that he is a better hero and that Bruce likely sent her to Hong Kong as a demotion. Despite Damian's hostility toward her, Cassandra ultimately saves his life after pulling him out of the club mere seconds before it is destroyed by a bomb. And after Dick discovers that the Architect plans to flood Gotham and kill thousands of civilians, Cassandra and Damian work together to dispose of the explosives that were supposed to sink the city. Once the Architect is defeated and captured, Cassandra decides to stay in Gotham rather than return to Hong Kong.

Cassandra later infiltrates a tournament for hired killers and rescues Red Robin, who had been captured and was about to be sexually assaulted by the half-sister of Ra's al Ghul. After rescuing Tim, Cassandra apparently kills him with a katana, thus winning the tournament for herself. But in fact, she has merely faked Red Robin's death to allow him to escape. The two then travel to Hong Kong to catch a 10-year-old assassin known as the Cricket, but are easily defeated. Just as Cassandra and Tim fall into unconsciousness, the Cricket vows to face them again someday, and tells them that he hopes they will put up a better fight next time.

=== The New 52 ===
In what might be a variant timeline, Cassandra is a member of Barbara Gordon's League of Batgirls, operating on the field under her leadership alongside fellow Batgirls Stephanie Brown and Tiffany Fox. Her father, David Cain, is portrayed as a character named the "Orphan", who raises Cassandra alone and forces her not to speak but to "listen" to body movements and react accordingly with deadly precision. She was intended to be a "gift" to the villain "Mother", to show her that child assassins can be manipulated through "the old ways" instead of through the use of drugs, but "Mother" rejected her and told Orphan never to do anything behind her back again. Although she is used by Mother to kill Miranda Row, mother of Batman's new ally Harper Row, at the conclusion of the storyline, Harper forgives Cassandra for her role in her mother's death, while Cassandra's own father David sacrifices himself to kill Mother by trapping her in her disintegrating fortress, refusing to allow her to torture others in the future. At the storyline's conclusion, Cassandra adopts her father's identity of Orphan to continue protecting others.

=== DC Rebirth ===
As Orphan, Cassandra is later inducted into Batman and Batwoman's "boot camp" for young Gotham vigilantes. Orphan is known for being the best fighter on the team. She tries to fight the team's battles alone and is known for sneaking into Stephanie Brown's and Harper Row's apartments in the middle of the night. When Batman is attacked by the Colony, she tries to take them on by herself and is left injured and later sedated after leading the Colony into their base. Clayface helps Batwoman, Red Robin, Spoiler, and the injured Orphan escape.

In August 2024, DC Comics announced a new solo series for Cassandra Cain, written by Tate Brombal and illustrated by Takeshi Miyazawa. This marked the first time she had led her own solo title as Batgirl in nearly two decades.

==== Batman and the Outsiders ====
Cassandra was a part of the latest Outsiders team, alongside Batman, Black Lightning, Katana, and Signal.

==== Batman: The Joker War Zone ====
In this anthology comic, Cassandra and Stephanie Brown fight the Hench Master in Blüdhaven. At the end of the story, both she and Stephanie reclaim the Bat symbol and Cass's costume becomes very similar to her previous Batgirl costume. In Infinite Frontier #0, Barbara Gordon – now primarily operating as Oracle again – explains to Huntress that Stephanie and Cass share the Batgirl title, but that she reserves the right to occasionally suit up as Batgirl in future.

=== Infinite Frontier ===
Cassandra makes more sporadic appearances in the main Batman series, like her helping Batman during the Fear State event as well as her teaming up with Stephanie Brown for their own Batgirls series. Cassandra Cain also tries to defeat Failsafe (a robot designed by Batman to take him down in case he went rogue) but fails and is temporarily captured before freed. She also confronted Batman during Gotham War for his recent violent actions due to Batman's trauma in traveling the Multiverse, but is swiftly defeated. During the Lazarus Planet event, she meets a non-binary warrior named Xanthe Zhou but is captured by spirits and sent to the spirit world. During "Titans: Beast World" she confronts a mutated Huntress but manages to calm her down. Cassandra joined the Birds of Prey. The team consisted of Black Canary, Big Barda, Zealot, Harley Quinn, and Black Canary's adopted sister Sin.

=== The All-In era ===
Following the ending of Batgirls, Cassandra Cain starred in the solo series Batgirl. Its first arc focuses on Cassandra's conflicted relationship with her mother, Shiva, who must reckon with a mysterious group of assassins called the Unburied after stealing their magic healing poppies. Following Shiva's presumed death, Cassandra investigates Shiva's early life and discovers that she has a brother known as the Jade Tiger. The two ally together in order to resolve the Unburied's vendetta against Shiva, the al Ghuls, and the League of Shadows.

Through her biological connection to Shiva, Cassandra is now also connected to the Blood, a clan of ninjas each able to wield blood as a weapon. After manifesting Blood powers beyond her control, Cassandra journeys into the spirit world and confronts the self-proclaimed "God of the Blood," the Midnight Eye. She discovers that her connection to the Blood was a curse placed upon her by a mysterious source, which was made possible due to a surge in Alpha energy following the events of "DC K.O." The Midnight Eye frees Cassandra from her curse at the cost of a future favor.

== Characterization ==
An unmasked Cassandra Cain (as Batgirl) from a variant textless cover art of Birds of Prey vol.5 #13 (November 2024). Art by Ejikure.

=== Description ===
Since the character's inception, Cassandra is often credited as being among the world's greatest martial artists on Earth within the DC Universe, surpassing the likes of Batman. Her most re-occurring conflict revolves around her abusive relationship with her father, having rejected her father's evil intentions, and her complex relationship with her mother, who struggles to define her relationship with Cassandra while viewing her as a rival capable of surpassing her abilities.

=== Literacy skills ===
Having been raised deliberately by David Cain without speech in an effort to teach her violence and martial artistry as her "first language", the character was first considered both mute and illiterate. Several storylines has since had the character address these limitations, with Batman and Barbara Gordon (Oracle and the first Batgirl) being chief among those who have supported and helped teach her social skills, reading, and writing. A telepath also once "re-wired" her brain to allow her to understand English albeit with difficulty and her speech was often accompanied by long pauses and used the wrong words at times.

In Batgirl #67 (October 2005), Oracle performed a number of tests on Cassandra, determining the severity of the problem: "The language centers of your brain are all over both hemispheres. Not centralized like with most people. When you try to read or write, your brain doesn't know how to keep it cohesive." In the 2008 Batgirl miniseries, the first issue delves into an explanation as to Cassandra's increased verbal and literary skills. It is explained that during the year in which Batman, Nightwing, and Robin were abroad, Cassandra and Alfred took it upon themselves to help develop the skills that she lacked due to her less than conventional childhood. By day, she took speech and ESL courses. The formal training aided her thought processes related to language, improving her speech capability.

== Skills and abilities ==
Having no inherent super-powers and having undergone training under numerous masters, Cassandra is considered skilled at martial art with virtual mastery of most known forms in which has included the following: Kung Fu, Jeet Kune Do, Muay Thai, Kōga-ryū Ninjutsu, Vovinam, Jujutsu, Mushin, and Escrima. Her knowledge also includes fictional styles such as being rudimentary skilled in Dhritishastra, an Indian martial art considered complex and only able to be mastered by immortals (i.e. Black Adam, Vandal Savage). Cassandra's prowess is also owed to her conditioning in which is considered "borderline human", her aggregated speed (able to perform certain great tasks simultaneously) noted by government experts to the point she was confused for being metahuman, and her acute ability to read body language to anticipate an opponent's next move, pin-point weak spots in their body, and even learn and understand other martial arts style via mimicry.

In addition to her unarmed skills and conditioning, she also has mastery with various weaponry, has been briefly trained in investigation methods during her time in Blüdhaven with Robin (Tim Drake), and is skilled in ballet dancing.

=== Costume and equipment ===
==== Batgirl costume ====
Cassandra's costume as Batgirl is composed of black skin-tight leather. Her mask covers all of her head with the exception of the eyes, which are darkened, and symbolic stitches surround the mouth of the mask. Cassandra wears a yellow-rimmed black logo rather than the yellow bat version of the logo worn by Barbara. The costume was first created and worn by the Huntress in the early stages of "No Man's Land". The costume displays slight variations in Titans East. The cape shows a yellow lining and Cassandra wears a "capsule" utility belt rather than pouches. In Teen Titans (vol. 3) #43, the once hollow bat-symbol appears to have been filled in and her cape is once again completely black; a new line of stitching goes up the forehead of her cowl. This version of the costume apparently results from one artist's interpretation, as Cassandra's appearances elsewhere (i.e., Supergirl and Batman and the Outsiders) show her wearing her standard Batgirl costume.

As Batgirl, Cassandra also wears a yellow-pouched utility belt which contains grappling hooks, batarangs, mini-explosives, tracking devices, a hand-held computer, binoculars, plastic handcuffs, and smoke pellets.

==== Other costumes ====
Her costume as Black Bat incorporates her former Batgirl costume, with some modifications. She now wears a domino mask and exposes the rest of her face and head. Her cape is now severely torn, looking ragged and almost smoke-like. Her hands are wrapped in bandages rather than her former scalloped bat-gloves. The costume she wore as Orphan consists of a form-fitting long sleeved black top, gloves, and full head mask; occasionally she has worn a variant with an attached hood and no mask. Her pants are looser and baggier in the thighs to allow greater flexibility with her acrobatics, and she wears knee-high black boots. The entire costume has yellow accents, with small armor plates in strategic areas on the torso and arms, and includes a yellow utility belt.

== Controversy ==
Critical reception of Cassandra's villainous turn in the "One Year Later" storyline was mixed. In general, the portrayal of Tim Drake was praised, whereas Cassandra's depiction was not. Upon being asked if Cassandra's characterization was editorially mandated, writer Adam Beechen stated, "When I came to the book, I was told that the first arc would deal with presenting Cassandra as a major new enemy for Robin. From there, I worked out the details of just how that would come about with our initial editor, Eddie Berganza, and then his successor, Peter Tomasi." In a follow-up interview, he clarified further, stating, "They didn't present me with a rationale as to why Cassandra was going to change, or a motivating factor. That was left for me to come up with and them to approve. And we did that. But as far as to why the editors and writers and whoever else made the decision decided that was a good direction, I honestly couldn't answer."

In interviews and press conferences, Dan DiDio and others have stated that Cass will "be going back to basics", as in her early adventures before she was able to talk. Later, Geoff Johns was quoted as saying, "We will be addressing in Teen Titans exactly what the deal is with her. Is she a bad guy? How? Why? She was a completely different character before 'One Year Later,' so let's find out what happened."

According to Wizard Magazine #182, the storyline was "one of the most controversial changes to come out of DC's 'One Year Later' event", and "fans rose up in arms, organizing websites and letter-writing campaigns to protest the change." Dan Didio commented, "I'm glad to see there was a reaction created, it shows that people care about the character and want to see something happen with her."

== Other versions ==
- In the alternate timeline portrayed in the "Titans Tomorrow" storyline in Teen Titans, Cassandra was murdered by Duela Dent. Years later, Tim Drake (now the new Batman) killed Duela in retaliation.
- In the timeline depicted in the sequel, Titans Tomorrow... Today!, Cassandra is portrayed as the successor to the Batwoman mantle, and a member of Lex Luthor's Titans Army.
- A young Cassandra appears in several issues of Tiny Titans. She is a friend of Barbara Gordon and Stephanie Brown.
- In The New 52: Futures End, Cassandra appears as a member of the League of Batgirls alongside Stephanie Brown and a young African-American girl named Tiffany Fox (the daughter of Lucius Fox). Her friendship with Stephanie appears to have remained intact.
- In the DC Comics Bombshells universe, Cassandra is a Chinese heroine known as Black Bat. After the end of World War II, she returns to her home country to help rebuild and make life better for the young girls there.
- In the Absolute Universe, Cassandra is the leader of a gang of thieves known as the Calicos, who were hired to retrieve a mysterious sphere that had been stolen by Catwoman.

== In other media ==
=== Television ===
- Cassandra Wu-San / Orphan appears in Young Justice. This version is a member of Batman Incorporated, later the Team, who had her vocal cords removed by her mother, Lady Shiva, as an infant and was originally with the League of Shadows before Batgirl convinced her to defect, though Cassandra accidentally paralyzed her in the process during a fight with the Joker.
- Cassandra Cain / Batgirl appears in Batwheels, voiced by Leah Lewis. This version is cheerful, lighthearted, and able to communicate.

=== Film ===
- Cassandra Cain appears in Birds of Prey, portrayed by Ella Jay Basco. This version is a twelve-year-old pickpocket who lives with neglectful foster parents and idolizes Harley Quinn. After unknowingly pilfering a diamond that Roman Sionis sought after, Cain joins forces with Quinn, Dinah Lance, Renee Montoya, and Helena Bertinelli to defeat Sionis and his forces. Afterwards, Cain gives the diamond to the group before becoming Quinn's apprentice.
- An alternate universe incarnation of Cassandra Cain named Kai Li Cain appears in Batman: The Doom That Came to Gotham, voiced by Tati Gabrielle.

=== Video games ===
- Cassandra Cain / Batgirl appears in Batman: Toxic Chill.
- Cassandra Cain / Batgirl makes a cameo appearance in Batman: Dark Tomorrow.
- Cassandra Cain / Batgirl appears in Batman: Justice Unbalanced.
- Cassandra Cain / Batgirl appears in DC Universe Online, voiced by Mindy Raymond.
- Cassandra Cain / Batgirl appears as a playable character in the mobile version of Injustice: Gods Among Us.

=== Miscellaneous ===
- Cassandra Cain / Batgirl appears in the audiobook adaptation of Batman: No Man's Land, voiced by Nanette Savard.
- Cassandra Cain / Batgirl makes a cameo appearance in Batman: The Brave and the Bold #13.

== Collected editions ==
Most of the 2000 Batgirl ongoing series, as well as the 2008 miniseries, has been collected into trade paperbacks.

Title	Material collected	Publication date	ISBN
Batgirl: Silent Running	Batgirl #1-6	March 2001	978-1840232660
Batgirl: A Knight Alone	Batgirl #7-11, #13-14	November 2001	978-1563898525
Batgirl: Death Wish	Batgirl #17-20, #22-23, #25	August 2003	978-1840237078
Batgirl: Fists of Fury	Batgirl #15-16, #21, #26-28	May 2004	978-1401202057
Robin/Batgirl: Fresh Blood	Batgirl #58-59; Robin #132-133	October 2005	978-1401204334
Batgirl: Kicking Assassins	Batgirl #60-64	January 2006	978-1401204396
Batgirl: Destruction's Daughter	Batgirl #65-73	September 2006	978-1401208967
Batgirl: Redemption	Batgirl #1-6 (2008 miniseries)	June 2009	978-1401222758
Batgirl Vol. 1: Silent Knight	Batgirl #1-12, Annual #1	January 2016	978-1401266271
Batgirl Vol. 2: To the Death	Batgirl #13-25	July 2016	978-1401263522
Batgirl Vol. 3: Point Blank	Batgirl #26-37, and a story from Batgirl: Secret Files & Origins #1	January 2017	978-1401265854
Batgirls Vol. 1	Batgirls Vol. 1 #1–19	February 2022	978-1779519528
Batgirls 2022 Annual	Batgirls 2022 Annual #1	January 2023	

=== Other collected editions ===
- Bruce Wayne: Murderer? (Batgirl #24)
- Bruce Wayne: Fugitive vol. 1 (Batgirl #27, #29)
- Bruce Wayne: Fugitive vol. 3 (Batgirl #33)
- Batman: War Games, Act 1 (Batgirl #55)
- Batman: War Games, Act 2 (Batgirl #56)
- Batman: War Games, Act 3 (Batgirl #57)
- Ghost/Batgirl: The Resurrection Machine (a 4-part miniseries crossover with Ghost, a Dark Horse Comics character)
- Bruce Wayne: Murderer? (New Edition) (Batgirl #24, #27)
- Bruce Wayne: Fugitive (New Edition) (Batgirl #29, #33)
- Batman: War Games Vol. 1 (Modern Release) (Batgirl #53, #55)
- Batman: War Games Vol. 2 (Modern Release) (Batgirl #56, #57)
