= The Joker War =

Comic book storyline

- Publisher: DC Comics
- Publication date: September – December 2020
- Genre: Superhero
Title(s)
Batman (vol. 3) #95–100
Nightwing (vol. 4) #70–73
- Main character(s): Batman; Joker; Nightwing; Red Hood; Oracle; Harley Quinn; Punchline

Creative team
- Writer: James Tynion IV
- Artist: Jorge Jiménez
- Penciller: Greg Capullo
- Inker: Danny Miki
- Letterer: Steve Wands
- Colorist: FCO Plascencia
- Editor: Mark Doyle

"The Joker War" is a comic book crossover storyline published by the comic book publishing company DC Comics in late 2020, featuring Batman and his allies. Primarily written by James Tynion IV, the arc is his first major arc on Batman in DC Rebirth. The main story was from Batman (vol. 3) #95–100, while 16 other issues were tie-ins.

The arc spans several titles featuring characters of the Batman family including: Batman, Batgirl, Catwoman, Detective Comics, Nightwing, Red Hood and the Outlaws, and Harley Quinn. The story involves the return of Batman's archenemy, the Joker, and his plan to destroy Bruce Wayne's reputation in Gotham City. The storyline received positive reviews for the art, action, and story. The story is also notable for prominently featuring the recently introduced Punchline, the Joker's new henchwoman and lover.

== Plot ==
Following the revealing of Superman's secret identity and the liberation of Gotham City from Bane, one of the Joker's thugs suggests revealing Batman's secret identity to the world. Joker, enraged at the thought, bashes the clown's head in for daring to even think this, as it would ruin his fun and rivalry with Batman. Joker decides to steal the Wayne fortune to humiliate Bruce in the eyes of Gotham, and tricks Catwoman into obtaining the codes for Wayne's bank accounts for him. Joker drains the accounts and seizes Bruce's fortune, amounting to over $100 billion. He then drugs and forces Lucius Fox to give him access to all of Batman's weapons after completing a hostile takeover of Wayne Enterprises. Batman is distracted by Deathstroke, who departs after Joker gives him a share of the Wayne fortune upon its seizure.

Joker uses his newfound billions to bribe and thereby paralyze the city government, GCPD, and press. He also hires armies of thugs and uses them and Batman's weapons to terrorize and destroy the city while the GCPD is forced to stand by and watch. Joker seizes Wayne Manor for himself and wastes the Wayne fortune on things like jokerized vehicles, gold chain necklaces, and other lavish items. This, along with Joker supplying and paying his army and bribing the city government, severely depletes the Wayne fortune by the tens of billions. When Batman confronts the Joker's thugs, the Joker's new girlfriend Punchline poisons him with her own version of the Joker toxin. Batman escapes while hallucinating under the toxin's influence. Harley Quinn nurses Batman back to health before being attacked by Punchline. Batman wakes up and defeats Punchline.

Batman gathers Dick Grayson, Jason Todd, Tim Drake, Cassandra Cain, Barbara Gordon, Stephanie Brown, Duke Thomas, and Harley Quinn. With their help, Batman takes back Gotham City, but the Joker insists that he has still won. By using Wayne's tech to cause destruction, he has shown Gotham City that Wayne Enterprises is just as corrupt as any other company. Bruce's reputation has been ruined, Wayne Enterprises is near bankruptcy along with Bruce's personal fortune, and Gotham City no longer needs Batman. Harley Quinn says she is tired of Batman not stopping the Joker for good. She gives Batman a choice: save her or the Joker. Harley straps bombs on the Joker and herself and jumps out of the burning building. Batman chooses to save Harley Quinn as the building explodes.

A week later, Batman visits Harley and explains that when he got back, the Joker was nowhere to be found. Batman notices how Gotham City looks different. Harley says Gotham City is an ugly city with ugly people, but at least the people are alive. Batman tells Harley Quinn that he is glad she is okay, and that he just buried Alfred. Batman explains that Alfred once told him that fighting the Joker was like fighting himself, and the fighting is living, continuing on, and Batman is prepared for the fight as well as vowing to be a better man.

=== Tie-in issues ===
Other Batman comics expanded on small elements of the larger ongoing storyline:

- In Batgirl (vol. 5) #47-50, the Joker kidnaps Lucius Fox and injects him with a modified Joker venom, making him hand over codes to all of Batman's weapons and unleashing chaos on the city with his goons. He also gained control of the city and went for Bruce's ally Batgirl, who was secretly Barbara Gordon.
- In Detective Comics #1025, Batman and Batwoman liberate Lucius Fox from the Joker's thugs at Wayne Tower.
- In Catwoman (vol. 5) #25 & #26, Catwoman convinces the Penguin and the Riddler to help her steal Bruce Wayne's money, rendering Wayne and by extension Batman, helpless.
- Batman: The Joker War Zone shows the Joker's thugs running rampant with the Bat-family nowhere to be seen, leading to vigilantism.
- Red Hood: Outlaws #48 shows Jason Todd's arrival in Gotham after hearing of the mass civil unrest.
- In Nightwing (vol. 4) #72–75, the Joker brainwashes Dick Grayson into believing it was he, not Bruce Wayne, who raised Grayson after his parents' death. Batgirl, Jason Todd, Tim Drake, and Grayson's girlfriend Bea Bennett join forces to save Grayson from the Joker and Punchline.

== Titles involved ==
=== Road to Joker War ===
- Batman (vol. 2) #90–94
- Detective Comics #1022–1024
- Nightwing (vol. 4) #70–73

=== Main story ===
- Batman (vol. 3) #95–100

=== Tie-ins ===
- Batgirl (vol. 5) #47–50
- Catwoman (vol. 5) #25–26
- Detective Comics #1025–1027
- Nightwing (vol. 4) #74–75
- Red Hood: Outlaws #48
- Batman: The Joker Warzone #1
- Harley Quinn (vol. 3) #75

== Collected editions ==
Title	Material collected	Published date	ISBN
Batman Vol. 1: Their Dark Designs	Batman (vol. 3) #86-94	October 2020	978-1779505569
Batman Vol. 2: The Joker War	Batman (vol. 3) #95-100	February 2021	978-1779507907
Batman: Detective Comics Vol. 5: The Joker War	Detective Comics #1020-1026, Batman: Pennyworth R.I.P., Detective Comics Annual #3 and material from Detective Comics #1027	March 2021	978-1779509222
Nightwing: The Joker War	Nightwing (vol. 4) #70-77, Nightwing Annual #3	March 2021	978-1779505699
Batgirl Vol. 8: The Joker War	Batgirl (vol. 5) #45-50	March 2021	978-1779505828
The Joker War Saga	Batman (vol. 3) #95-100, Batgirl (vol. 5) #47, Detective Comics #1025, Red Hood: Outlaw #48, Nightwing (vol. 4) #74, The Joker War Zone #1 and material from Harley Quinn (vol. 3) #75 and Catwoman (vol. 5) #25	February 2021	978-1779511799

== Reception ==
The main story received generally positive reviews for the action, plot, and art style. The entire storyline (including tie-ins) received an average score of 7.7 out of 10 according to Comic Book Roundup.

According to the review aggregator Comic Book Roundup, issue #95 received an average score of 8.2 out of 10 based on 22 reviews. Derek McNeil from DC Comics News wrote that "Tynion has done a masterful job of setting up the ultimate showdown between Batman and the Joker. Batman is backed into a corner with no help and no resources, while the Joker has possession of his wealth, his tech, and his secrets. The next few months are going to be a wild and crazy ride for Batman readers".

According to Comic Book Roundup, issue #96 received an average score of 7.8 out of 10 based on 21 reviews. Charles Hartford from But Why Tho? wrote: "Batman #96 blew me away. I havent been this taken with a Batman story in quite some time. If the creatives can keep this energy going for the rest of this storyline The Joker War could find itself a spot among the great stories in the Dark Knights history".

According to Comic Book Roundup, issue #97 received an average score of 7.9 out of 10 based on 21 reviews. Jeffrey Movie Files wrote: "The Joker War is building to its conclusion with #100, but at this rate, Tynion really could take longer in playing it out as its been an amazing ride so far".

According to Comic Book Roundup, issue #98 received an average score of 7.8 out of 10 based on 19 reviews. Wes Greer from Comics the Gathering wrote: "Overall, Batman #98 delivers all the excitement and emotions we could ask for in a Batman story, getting us pumped up for Batman to get back up on his feet as well as the excitement of the battles around him all leading to the final blows to come in Batman #100 while all brought to life by an incredible art team who seem to have really found their groove and taking fans into a deep and dark Gotham city full of beautiful characters and details".

According to Comic Book Roundup, issue #99 received an average score of 7.4 out of 10 based on 23 reviews. Kevin Lainez from Comic Book Revolution wrote: "In terms of bringing all of the sub-plots in this series and tie-in comics together Batman #99 gets the job done. James Tynion and Jorge Jimenez bring everything together to provide a strong set-up for the final chapter of Joker War. Unfortunately by bringing together so many different sub-plots together does show that Joker War may have had way to many things going on for its own good. Hopefully Batman #100's increased page count will help in fixing these story problems and wrap up Joker War in a satisfying way".

According to Comic Book Roundup, issue #100 received an average score of 7.9 out of 10 based on 24 reviews. Travis Trucker from On Comics Ground wrote: "Long story short. I loved this ending. It's rare that all of my complaints of an arc are dealt with by its climax, but it is a sublime feeling to witness it happen. It's about time".
