= List of The New 52 publications =

In September 2011, DC Comics relaunched their entire line of publications, dubbing the new publishing initiative as The New 52. The initiative consisted of a new imprint of titles, all labeled with "The New 52" logo, as well as creating a rebooted DC Universe post-"Flashpoint" that saw characters from the former WildStorm and Vertigo imprints being absorbed into the main DC Comics line. The intent was to publish 52 ongoing titles each month across the DC Universe. However, DC has also counted one-shots, miniseries and maxiseries in that number.

In June 2015, following the conclusion of the Convergence miniseries, "The New 52" branding and imprint were discontinued, although the continuity continued under a new initiative, "DC You". In February 2016, DC announced the Rebirth initiative, bringing an end to the New 52 beginning in June 2016. Gotham Academy: Second Semester was the final title to release from the New 52, with the final issue releasing in August 2017. An additional Earth-2 title was announced to replace Earth-2: Society, but details were not provided.

DC released a total of 111 ongoing titles during The New 52. To expand The New 52 universe, DC had also released 34 one-shots, 32 miniseries and four maxiseries, with one ongoing series planned. One ongoing series was planned but did not release before Rebirth took effect in June 2016. Additionally, another ongoing series was planned but cancelled, with its concepts merged into another title.

== Imprint titles ==
The ongoing titles under The New 52 imprint were organized under seven different "families", grouping similar characters or themes within the books together. These families were: "Justice League"; "Batman"; "Superman"; "Green Lantern"; "Young Justice"; "The Edge"; and "The Dark". However, by the release of the October 2013 solicitations, DC was no longer grouping the titles by these families, instead releasing one larger solicit, titled "The New 52 Group".

From September 2011 until June 2015, DC released 93 ongoing titles under the imprint across multiple "wave" releases, and to expand The New 52 universe, also released 21 one-shots, 17 miniseries and three maxiseries. DC used the "wave" format of introducing new titles, which occasionally corresponded with titles being canceled, to "constantly refresh the line". Additionally, in subsequent Septembers following the launch, DC featured unique publishing initiatives to commemorate the relaunch.

== Post-imprint titles ==
In February 2015, it was revealed that after the Convergence miniseries in June 2015, DC would no longer use the "New 52" name to brand their books; however the continuity established in September 2011 would continue. Dan DiDio stated, "In this new era of storytelling, story will trump continuity as we continue to empower creators to tell the best stories". Jim Lee added, "Rather than having 52 books all in the same continuity, and really focusing on keeping a universe that's tightly connected and has super-internal consistency, and really one flavor, we've really broken it up. We'll have a core line of about 25 books that will have that internal consistency, that will consist of our best-selling books. But then the rest of the line, about 24 titles, will be allowed to really shake things up a little bit." The new titles would be "reinventing key characters", such as Black Canary, Cyborg, Bizarro, and Starfire, with a new "contemporary tonality to ensure a diverse offering of comic books." In the initial "relaunch", 24 new publications joined 25 existing publications from before Convergence, with new titles continuing to be added. In March 2015, DiDio revealed there would not be an "overarching brand on this" stating the relaunch was just "DC Comics, pure and simple." However, in May 2015, DC announced the advertising campaign "DC You" for the relaunch, highlighting the four themes of characters, talent, stories and fans. The initiative, which began in DC's print and digital comics on May 20, before transitioning to other digital content on June 3, was featured on print inserts and ads, as well as on the DC Comics website and across social media with a special hashtag.

In February 2016, DC Comics announced its Rebirth initiative, a line-wide relaunch of its titles to begin in June 2016. Along with a number of existing New 52 titles relaunching with new #1s and the cancellation of others, DC planned to reintroduced many of the familiar concepts for characters, such as legacy, from the pre-Flashpoint continuity that had been lost with the New 52, by creating a new DC Universe that built "on everything that's been published since Action Comics #1 up thru The New 52."

Since the "relaunch", DC has released an additional 18 ongoing series, as well as 15 miniseries, 13 one-shots, and one maxiseries, with one ongoing series planned. One ongoing series was planned but did not release before Rebirth took effect in June 2016. Additionally, another ongoing series was planned but cancelled, with its concepts merged into another title.

=== Continuing titles ===
These titles were published before Convergence and continued their previous numbering, as opposed to being renumbered or relaunched in June 2015.

| Title | Publication dates / Issues | Initial creative team^{[note1]} | Notes / References |
|---|---|---|---|
| Action Comics | June 2015 – May 2016 (41–52) | Writers; Greg Pak; Aaron Kuder; Artist; Aaron Kuder | |
| Aquaman | June 2015 – May 2016 (41–52) | Writer; Cullen Bunn; Artist; Trevor McCarthy | |
| Batgirl | June 2015 – May 2016 (41–52, plus 1 annual) | Writers; Cameron Stewart; Brenden Fletcher; Artist; Babs Tarr | Focusing on Barbara Gordon. |
| Batman | June 2015 – May 2016 (41–52, plus 1 annual) | Writer; Scott Snyder; Penciller; Greg Capullo; Inker; Danny Miki | Initially focusing on James Gordon now operating a Batman-themed exo-suit, later the original Batman, after an amnesiac Bruce Wayne regains his memories. |
| Batman/Superman | June 2015 – May 2016 (21–32) | Writer; Greg Pak; Artist; Ardian Syaf | The series focuses on the shared adventures of Batman (Jim Gordon) and Superman, then the original Batman after he regains his memories. |
| Catwoman | June 2015 – May 2016 (41–52) | Writer; Genevieve Valentine; Artist; David Messina | |
| Deathstroke (vol. 3) | June 2015 – July 2016 (7–20, plus 2 annuals) | Writers; Tony S. Daniel; Jim Bonny; Artist; Tony S. Daniel | |
| Detective Comics | June 2015 – May 2016 (41–52) | Writers; Francis Manapul; Brian Buccelato; Artist; Francis Manapul | Focusing on the adventures of the new Batman (James Gordon). |
| The Flash | June 2015 – May 2016 (41–52, plus 1 annual) | Writers; Robert Vendetti; Van Jensen; Penciller; Brett Booth; Inker; Norm Rapmund | Focusing on Barry Allen. |
| Gotham Academy | June 2015 – August 2016 (7–18, plus 1 annual) | Writers; Becky Cloonan; Brandon Fletcher; Artist; Mingjue Helen Chen | A teen drama set in a preparatory school in Gotham, where Bruce Wayne is a benefactor. |
| Gotham by Midnight | June 2015 – December 2015 (6–12, plus 1 annual) | Writer; Ray Fawkes; Artist; Juan Ferreyra | A horror series featuring Detective Jim Corrigan (Spectre) as part of "The Midnight Shift", a division of the Gotham City Police Department which focuses on supernatural occurrences. |
| Grayson | June 2015 – June 2016 (9–20, plus 2 annuals) | Writers; Tim Seeley; Tom King; Artist; Mikel Janin | Examining Dick Grayson's life as an undercover superspy for Spyral. |
| Green Arrow | June 2015 – May 2016 (41–52, plus 1 annual) | Writer; Ben Percy; Artist; Patrick Zircher | |
| Green Lantern | June 2015 – May 2016 (41–52, plus 1 annual) | Writer; Robert Vendetti; Penciller; Billy Tan; Inker; Mark Irwin | Focusing on the Green Lantern Hal Jordan, now a rogue from the Green Lantern Corps. |
| Harley Quinn | June 2015 – July 2016 (17–30) | Writers; Amanda Conner; Jimmy Palmiotti; Artist; Chad Hardin | |
| Justice League | June 2015 – June 2016 (41–52) | Writer; Geoff Johns; Artist; Jason Fabok | Focusing on the team of Superman, Batman, Green Lantern, Flash, Wonder Woman, Aquaman, Cyborg, Shazam, Power Ring, Lex Luthor and Mister Miracle. |
| Justice League United | July 2015 – December 2015 (11–16) | Writer; Jeff Parker; Artist; Travel Foreman | Focusing on Alanna, Animal Man, Stargirl and Equinox, who recruit other heroes and villains of the DC Universe as necessary. |
| Lobo | June 2015 – December 2015 (7–13, plus 1 annual) | Writer; Cullen Bunn; Artist; Cliff Richards | |
| New Suicide Squad | June 2015 – July 2016 (9–22, plus 1 annual) | Writer; Sean Ryan; Artist; Philippe Briones | |
| Secret Six | June 2015 – May 2016 (3–14) | Writer; Gail Simone; Artists; Ken Lashley; Dale Eaglesham | Focusing on Catman, Porcelain, Big Shot, Ventriloquist, Black Alice and Strix. |
| Sinestro | June 2015 – May 2016 (12–23) | Writer; Cullen Bunn; Penciller; Brad Walker; Inker; Andrew Hennessy | Also featuring members of the Sinestro Corps, with Arkillo, Lyssa Drak, Dez Trevius, and Rigen Kale acting as an "inner council" for Sinestro. |
| Superman | June 2015 – May 2016 (41–52, plus 1 annual) | Writer; Gene Luen Yang; Penciler; John Romita Jr. Inker; Klaus Janson | |
| Superman/Wonder Woman | June 2015 – May 2016 (18–29, plus 1 annual) | Writer; Peter Tomasi; Artists; Doug Mahnke others | The series explores the relationship between Superman and Wonder Woman. |
| Teen Titans (vol. 5) | June 2015 – September 2016 (9–24, plus 1 annuals) | Writer; Will Pfeifer; Artist; Kenneth Rocafort | Initial team consists of Red Robin, Wonder Girl, Raven, Bunker, and Beast Boy. |
| Wonder Woman | June 2015 – May 2016 (41–52, plus 1 annual) | Writer; Meredith Finch; Penciller; David Finch; Inker; Jonathan Glapion | |

==== Discontinued ====
| Title | Publication dates / Issues | Initial creative team^{[note1]} | Notes / References |
|---|---|---|---|
| Batman Beyond | June 2015 – September 2016 (1–16) | Writer; Dan Jurgens; Artist; Bernard Chang | Spinning out of Convergence and set 35 years in the DC Universe future, focusing on Tim Drake. |
| Black Canary | June 2015 – May 2016 (1–12) | Writer; Brenden Fletcher; Artist; Annie Wu | Spinning out of Batgirl issue 40. |
| Constantine: The Hellblazer | June 2015 – June 2016 (1–13) | Writers; Ming Doyle; James Tynion IV; Artist; Riley Rossmo | |
| Cyborg | July 2015 – June 2016 (1–12) | Writer; David F. Walker; Artists; Ivan Reis; Joe Prado | |
| Doctor Fate | June 2015 – November 2016 (1–18) | Writer; Paul Levitz; Artist; Sonny Liew | |
| Earth 2: Society | June 2015 – March 2017 (1–22, plus 1 annual) | Writer; Daniel H. Wilson; Artist; Jorge Jimenez | This series is set on a parallel earth after Earth-2 is destroyed. It is a continuation of Earth 2. |
| Gotham Academy: Second Semester | September 2016 – August 2017 (1–12) | Writers; Becky Cloonan; Brandon Fletcher; Karl Kerschel; Artists; Adam Archer; Sandra Hope | Originally announced as a title part of the "Rebirth" initiative, it was later revealed that Gotham Academy: Second Semester would be a continuation of Gotham Academy and was not considered a Rebirth title. |
| Justice League 3001 | June 2015 – May 2016 (1–12) | Writers; Keith Giffen; J. M. DeMatteis; Artist; Howard Porter | The series is a continuation of Justice League 3000. |
| Justice League of America | June 2015 – November 2016 (1–10) | Writer; Bryan Hitch; Artists; Bryan Hitch; Wade von Grawbadger | Featuring the initial team of Aquaman, Batman, Cyborg, The Flash, Green Lantern, Superman and Wonder Woman. The final issue was originally solicited to release in August 2016, along with an annual. However, in June 2016, DC cancelled the remaining unreleased issues (issues 9 through 12, and the annual), telling retailers the issues would be "resolicited at a later date." The final issues were resolicted for release in August and September 2016, with the annual releasing in November 2016. After the resolict, DC once again cancelled issues 11, 12 and the annual in August 2016, with the series concluding with issue 10 in November 2016. |
| Martian Manhunter | June 2015 – May 2016 (1–12) | Writer; Rob Williams; Penciller; Eddy Barrows; Inker; Eber Ferreira | |
| Midnighter | June 2015 – May 2016 (1–12) | Writer; Steve Orlando; Artist; ACO | Spinning out of Grayson. |
| The Omega Men | June 2015 – May 2016 (1–12) | Writer; Tom King; Artist; Alec Morgan | In September 2015, the December solicits indicated the series would end with issue 7. However, shortly thereafter, Lee, DiDio and DC decided to allow the series to continue until at least issue 12. |
| Red Hood/Arsenal | June 2015 – June 2016 (1–13) | Writer; Scott Lobdell; Artist; Denis Medri | The series is a continuation of Red Hood and the Outlaws, focusing only on Jason Todd and Roy Harper. |
| Robin: Son of Batman | June 2015 – June 2016 (1–13) | Writer; Patrick Gleason; Penciller; Patrick Gleason; Inker; Mick Gray | |
| Starfire | June 2015 – May 2016 (1–12) | Writers; Amanda Conner; Jimmy Palmiotti; Artist; Emanuela Lupacchino | |
| Superman: Lois & Clark | October 2015 – May 2016 (1–8) | Writer; Dan Jurgens; Artist; Lee Weeks | Spinning out of Convergence, following pre-"Flashpoint" Superman, Lois Lane and their child, nine years after Convergence. |
| Telos | October 2015 – March 2016 (1–6) | Writer; Jeff King; Artists; Carlo Pagulayan; Jason Paz | Spinning out of Convergence. |
| We Are... Robin | June 2015 – May 2016 (1–12) | Writer; Lee Bermejo; Artists; Rob Haynes; Khary Randolph | Spinning out of the Batman storyline "Endgame", the series features hundreds of Gotham City teenagers adopted the Robin name and mantle. |

==== Unpublished and cancelled ====
Mystik U, written by Alisa Kwitney with art from Mauricet, would have focused on a college for magic people, featuring Rose Psychic and Cain and Abel. Kwitney original stated the title would debut in October 2015, but it was not released before Rebirth took effect in June 2016. The title was eventually solicited in August 2017 for a November 2017 release as a "prestige-format limited series" outside DC Rebirth continuity. The series now featured art from Mike Norton, and centered on Zatanna, Sebastian Faust, Enchantress, Pia Morales and Sargon the Sorcerer.

Dark Universe was announced with the other new DC You titles, as a continuation of Justice League Dark, with James Tynion IV and Ming Doyle working on the title. However, in May 2015, Tynion revealed the book was no longer being developed, with Doyle and him "folding a lot of" their ideas for the series into their Constantine: The Hellblazer run.

Earth 2 was announced as a continuation of Earth 2: Society, initially as a title part of the "Rebirth" initiative.

=== One-shots ===
In May 2015, DC released eight-page original stories for free in the monthly titles of "Convergence" as well as on DC's website and other digital distributors such as comiXology. The stories provided a sampling of the new titles launching in June as a way to generate excitement for the titles and for readers to "get a chance to read these books, see the different styles of art, read the different types of stories, see how [DC] plan[s] to interpret [their] characters in a new way".

| Title | Creative team | Notes / References |
|---|---|---|
| Batman: Endgame Director's Cut #1; November 2015 | Writer; Scott Snyder; Penciller; Greg Capullo | |
| Divergence FCBD Special Edition; May 2015 | Writers; Geoff Johns; Scott Snyder; Gene Luen Yang; Artists; Jason Fabok; Greg Capullo; John Romita Jr. | A Free Comic Book Day issue, featuring eight page previews of the June 2015 issues of: the "Darkseid War" storyline in Justice League by Johns and Fabok; Batman by Snyder and Capullo; and Superman by Yang and Romita. |
| Harley Quinn & the Suicide Squad April Fools' Special #1; April 2016 | Writers; Rob Williams; Artists; Jim Lee; Scott Williams; Sean "Cheeks" Galloway | |
| Harley Quinn Road Trip Special #1; September 2015 | Writers; Amanda Conner; Jimmy Palmiotti; Artists; Bret Blevins others | |
| Justice League: Darkseid War – Batman #1; October 2015 | Writer; Peter Tomasi; Artist; Fernando Pasarin | Spinning out of the Justice League storyline "Darkseid War". Originally titled Justice League: Gods and Men, but was changed in order to avoid confusion with the similarly titled, yet unrelated, Justice League: Gods and Monsters. |
| Justice League: Darkseid War – The Flash #1; October 2015 | Writer; Rob Williams; Artist; Jesus Merino | Spinning out of the Justice League storyline "Darkseid War". Originally titled Justice League: Gods and Men, but was changed in order to avoid confusion with the similarly titled, yet unrelated, Justice League: Gods and Monsters. |
| Justice League: Darkseid War – Green Lantern #1; November 2015 | Writer; Tom King; Artist; Evan "Doc" Shaner | Spinning out of the Justice League storyline "Darkseid War". Originally titled Justice League: Gods and Men, but was changed in order to avoid confusion with the similarly titled, yet unrelated, Justice League: Gods and Monsters. |
| Justice League: Darkseid War – Lex Luthor #1; December 2015 | Writer; Francis Manapul; Artist; Bong Dazo | Spinning out of the Justice League storyline "Darkseid War". Originally titled Justice League: Gods and Men, but was changed in order to avoid confusion with the similarly titled, yet unrelated, Justice League: Gods and Monsters. |
| Justice League: Darkseid War – Shazam! #1; November 2015 | Writer; Steve Orlando; Artist; Scott Kolins | Spinning out of the Justice League storyline "Darkseid War". Originally titled Justice League: Gods and Men, but was changed in order to avoid confusion with the similarly titled, yet unrelated, Justice League: Gods and Monsters. |
| Justice League: Darkseid War – Superman #1; November 2015 | Writer; Francis Manapul; Artist; Bong Dazo | Spinning out of the Justice League storyline "Darkseid War". Originally titled Justice League: Gods and Men, but was changed in order to avoid confusion with the similarly titled, yet unrelated, Justice League: Gods and Monsters. |
| Justice League: Darkseid War Special #1; April 2016 | Writer; Geoff Johns; Artist; Oscar Jimenez | |
| Robin War #1; December 2015 | Writer; Tom King; Artist; Khary Randolph | |
| Robin War #2; January 2016 | Writer; Tom King; Artist; Khary Randolph | |

=== Miniseries ===
| Title | Creative team | Notes / References |
|---|---|---|
| All-Star Section Eight #1–6; June 2015 – November 2015 | Writer; Garth Ennis; Artist; John McCrea | Featuring Sixpack, Bueno Excellente, Baytor, Dogwelder, and other characters from Hitman. |
| Bat-Mite #1–6; June 2015 – November 2015 | Writer; Dan Jurgens; Artist; Corin Howell | |
| Bizarro #1–6; June 2015 – November 2015 | Writer; Heath Corson; Artist; Gustavo Duarte | |
| Doomed #1–6; June 2015 – November 2015 | Writer; Scott Lobdell; Artist; Javier Fernandez | Originally solicited as an ongoing series, DC later stated the series was always intended as a miniseries. |
| Green Lantern Corps: Edge of Oblivion #1–6; January 2016 – June 2016 | Writer; Tom Taylor; Artist; Ethan Van Sciver | The series is a continuation of Green Lantern: Lost Army. |
| Green Lantern: Lost Army #1–6; June 2015 – November 2015 | Writer; Cullen Bunn; Artist; Jesus Saiz | Focusing on John Stewart, Guy Gardner, Two-Six, Kilowog, and Arisia Rrab. The series is a continuation of Green Lantern Corps. Originally solicited as an ongoing series, DC later stated the series was always intended as a miniseries. |
| Harley Quinn & Her Gang of Harleys #1–6; April 2016 – September 2016 | Writers; Frank Tieri; Jimmy Palmiotti; Artist; Mauricet | |
| Harley Quinn and Power Girl #1–6; June 2015 – November 2015 | Writers; Amanda Conner; Jimmy Palmiotti; Justin Gray; Artist; Stephane Roux | Set between panels 3 and 4 on page 20 of Harley Quinn #12. Palmiotti said, "There's a panel where Harley and Power Girl are jumping from one teleportation ring to the other, and she they come out of it, Power Girl's wearing a wedding dress and Harley has some armor on, and Power Girl says, you know, this was the longest two weeks of my life... So the six-issue mini-series is everything that happened between those two panels. which show Harley Quinn and Power Girl jumping through teleportation rings." |
| Legends of Tomorrow #1–6; March 2016 – August 2016 | Various | An anthology series featuring four different stories centered on different characters. They include: Firestorm, written by Gerry Conway with art by Eduardo Pansica and Rob Hunter; Metal Men, written by Len Wein with art by Yıldıray Çınar and Trevor Scott; Metamorpho, written by Aaron Lopresti with art by Aaron Lopresti and Matt Banning; Sugar & Spike, written by Keith Giffen with art by Bilquis Evely; A "grownup spin" on the comic-book toddlers of the 1950s and 1960s. According to publisher DiDio, Sugar and Spike are "not spoiled kids anymore, but they're older and they're operating as private investigators handling problems and mysteries that the superheroes can't handle themselves." |
| Poison Ivy: Cycle of Life and Death #1–6; January 2016 – June 2016 | Writer; Amy Chu; Artist; Clay Mann | |
| Prez #1–6; June 2015 – November 2015 | Writer; Mark Russell; Artist; Ben Caldwell | Following nineteen-year-old Beth Ross, the first teenaged President of the United States. |
| Raven #1–6; September 2016 – February 2017 | Writer; Marv Wolfman; Artist; Alisson Borges | Set between Teen Titans #24 and Teen Titans: Rebirth #1. |
| Suicide Squad Most Wanted: Deadshot & Katana #1–6; January 2016 – June 2016 Suicide Squad Most Wanted: El Diablo & Boomerang #1-6 | Writers; Mike W. Barr; Brian Bucellato; Artists; Diogenes Neves; Viktor Bogdanovic | This series is a double-sized anthology series that features a regular comic book length story for both Deadshot and Katana. Barr and Neves are the creative team for Katana's story, while Bucellato and Bogdanovic are the creative team for Deadshot's story. The series was originally announced as Katana: Cult of the Kobra. |
| Swamp Thing #1–6; January 2016 – June 2016 | Writer; Len Wein; Artist; Kelley Jones | |
| Titans Hunt #1–8; October 2015 – May 2016 | Writer; Dan Abnett; Artist; Palo Siqueira | Spinning out of Convergence. Originally solicited as a 12 issue series. |

=== Maxiseries ===
| Title | Initial creative team^{[note1]} | Notes / References |
|---|---|---|
| Batman and Robin Eternal #1–26; October 2015 – April 2016 | Writers; James Tynion IV; Scott Snyder; Tim Seeley; Steve Orlando; Artists; Tony S. Daniel; Paul Pelletier; Scot Eaton | A six-month weekly series serving as a follow-up to Batman Eternal, intended to celebrate the 75th anniversary of the Robin character. Additional writers on the series include Genevieve Valentine, Ed Brisson, and Jackson Lanzing & Collin Kelly. The series centers around Dick Grayson, Harper Row and Cassandra Cain, with Cain being reintroduced to the DC Universe since the New 52 relaunch, and highlights all of the Robins. |

== Collected editions ==
| Title | Page count | Material collected | Publication date | ISBN | Ref |
|---|---|---|---|---|---|
| All-Star Section 8 TP | 144 | All-Star Section 8 #1–8, plus the sneak peek story from Convergence: Harley Quinn #2 | June 15, 2016 | | |
| Aquaman Volume 7: Exiled HC | 192 | Aquaman Vol. 7 #41–48, plus the sneak peek story from Convergence: Suicide Squad #2 | April 20, 2016 | | |
| Aquaman Volume 8: Out of Darkness HC | 144 | Aquaman Vol. 7 #48–52, Aquaman: Rebirth #1 | November 30, 2016 | | |
| Bat-Mite TP | 144 | Bat-Mite #1–6, plus the sneak peek story from Convergence: Supergirl: Matrix #2 | February 17, 2016 | | |
| Batgirl Volume 2: Family Business TP | 168 | Batgirl Vol. 4 #41–45, Batgirl Annual Vol. 4 #3, plus the sneak peek story from Convergence: Infinity Inc. #2 | February 17, 2016 | | |
| Batgirl Volume 3: Minefields TP | 176 | Batgirl Vol. 4 #46–52 | August 24, 2016 | | |
| Batman and Robin Eternal Volume 1 TP | 288 | Batman and Robin Eternal #1–12, plus the eight-page story from Batman: Endgame Special Edition #1 | March 9, 2016 | | |
| Batman and Robin Eternal Volume 2 TP | 336 | Batman and Robin Eternal #13–26 | June 29, 2016 | | |
| Batman Beyond Volume 1: Brave New Worlds TP | 144 | Batman Beyond Vol. 6 #1–6, plus the sneak peek story from Convergence: Batman and the Outsiders #2 | March 9, 2016 | | |
| Batman Beyond Volume 2: City of Yesterday TP | 128 | Batman Beyond Vol. 6 #7–11 | September 28, 2016 | | |
| Batman Beyond Volume 3: Wired for Death TP | 136 | Batman Beyond Vol. 6 #12–16, Batman Beyond: Rebirth #1 | February 22, 2017 | | |
| Batman Volume 8: Superheavy HC | 160 | Batman Vol. 2 #41–45, plus a story from DC Comics Divergence #1 | March 16, 2016 | | |
| Batman Volume 9: Bloom HC | 184 | Batman Vol. 2 #46–50, plus a story from Detective Comics Vol. 2 #27 | September 7, 2016 | | |
| Batman Volume 10: Epilogue HC | 144 | Batman Vol. 2 #51–52, Batman Annual Vol. 2 #4, Batman: Futures End #1, Batman: Rebirth #1 | December 14, 2016 | | |
| Batman: Detective Comics Volume 8: Blood of Heroes HC | 192 | Detective Comics Vol. 2 #41–47, plus the sneak peek story from Convergence: Justice League #2 | July 27, 2016 | | |
| Batman: Detective Comics Volume 9: Gordon At War HC | 200 | Detective Comics Vol. 2 #47–52 | November 30, 2016 | | |
| Batman/Superman Volume 5: Truth Hurts HC | 176 | Batman/Superman #21–27, plus the sneak peek story from Convergence: Justice League of America #2 | August 10, 2016 | | |
| Batman/Superman Volume 6: Universe's Finest TP | 224 | Batman/Superman #28–32, plus the unpublished Batman/Superman #33–34 and Batman/Superman Annual #3 | April 5, 2017 | | |
| Bizarro TP | 144 | Bizarro #1–6, plus the sneak peek story from Convergence: Superman: Man of Steel #2 | February 3, 2016 | | |
| Black Canary Volume 1: Kicking and Screaming TP | 168 | Black Canary #1–7, plus the sneak peek story from Convergence: Blue Beetle #2 | March 2, 2016 | | |
| Black Canary Volume 2: New Killer Star TP | 144 | Black Canary #8–12, Gotham Academy #17, Batgirl and the Birds of Prey: Rebirth #1 | November 23, 2016 | | |
| Catwoman Volume 7: Inheritance TP | 160 | Catwoman Vol. 4 #41–46, plus the sneak peek story from Convergence: Swamp Thing #2 | February 17, 2016 | | |
| Catwoman Volume 8: Run Like Hell TP | 160 | Catwoman Vol. 4 #47–52 | October 12, 2016 | | |
| Constantine: The Hellblazer Volume 1: Going Down TP | 160 | Constantine: The Hellblazer #1–6, plus the sneak peek story from Convergence: Shazam! #2 | February 10, 2016 | | |
| Constantine: The Hellblazer Volume 2: The Art of the Deal TP | 160 | Constantine: The Hellblazer #7–13 | September 21, 2016 | | |
| Cyborg Volume 1: Unplugged TP | 144 | Cyborg #1–6, plus the sneak peek story from Convergence: Crime Syndicate #2 | March 23, 2016 | | |
| Cyborg Volume 2: Enemy of the State TP | 168 | Cyborg #7–12, Cyborg: Rebirth #1 | November 30, 2016 | | |
| Deathstroke Volume 2: Godkiller TP | 144 | Deathstroke Vol. 3 #7–10, Deathstroke Annual Vol. 3 #1, plus the sneak peek story from Convergence: Batman: Shadow of the Bat #2 | February 24, 2016 | | |
| Deathstroke Volume 3: Suicide Run TP | 144 | Deathstroke Vol. 3 #11–16 | August 10, 2016 | | |
| Deathstroke Volume 4: Family Business TP | 136 | Deathstroke Vol. 3 #17–20, Deathstroke Annual Vol. 3 #2, Deathstroke: Rebirth #1 | December 14, 2016 | | |
| Doctor Fate Volume 1: The Blood Price TP | 144 | Doctor Fate #1–7, plus the sneak peek story from Convergence: Aquaman #2 | March 23, 2016 | | |
| Doctor Fate Volume 2: Prisoners of the Past TP | 128 | Doctor Fate #8–12 | October 19, 2016 | | |
| Doctor Fate Volume 3: Fateful Threads TP | 144 | Doctor Fate #13–18 | May 3, 2017 | | |
| Doomed TP | 144 | Doomed #1–6, plus the sneak peek story from Convergence: Superman #2 | February 17, 2016 | | |
| Earth 2: Society Volume 1: Planetfall TP | 144 | Earth 2: Society #1–6, plus the sneak peek story from Convergence: Booster Gold #2 | March 9, 2016 | | |
| Earth 2: Society Volume 2: Indivisible TP | 128 | Earth 2: Society #8–12 | August 24, 2016 | | |
| Earth 2: Society Volume 3: A Whole New World TP | 136 | Earth 2: Society #13–16, Earth 2: Society Annual #1 | April 5, 2017 | | |
| Earth 2: Society Volume 4: Life After Death TP | 136 | Earth 2: Society #17–22 | August 9, 2017 | | |
| Firestorm: The Nuclear Man – United We Fall TP | 144 | Firestorm: The Nuclear Man from Legends of Tomorrow #1–6 | December 7, 2016 | | |
| Gotham Academy Volume 2: Calamity TP | 144 | Gotham Academy #7–12, plus the sneak peek story from Convergence: Green Lantern Corps #2 | March 16, 2016 | | |
| Gotham Academy Volume 3: Yearbook TP | 176 | Gotham Academy #13–18, Gotham Academy Annual #1 | November 2, 2016 | | |
| Gotham Academy: Second Semester Volume 1: Welcome Back TP | 160 | Gotham Academy: Second Semester #1–3, 5–8 | July 19, 2017 | | |
| Gotham Academy: Second Semester Volume 2: The Ballad of Olive Silverlock TP | 128 | Gotham Academy: Second Semester #4, 9–12 | November 29, 2017 | | |
| Gotham by Midnight Volume 2: Rest in Peace TP | 208 | Gotham by Midnight #6–12, Gotham by Midnight Annual #1, plus the sneak peek story from Convergence: Catwoman #2 | April 6, 2016 | | |
| Grayson Volume 3: Nemesis TP | 160 | Grayson #9–12, Grayson Annual #2, plus the sneak peek story from Convergence: Hawkman #2 | May 11, 2016 | | |
| Grayson Volume 4: A Ghost in the Tomb TP | 184 | Grayson #13–16, Robin War #1–2 | October 15, 2016 | | |
| Grayson Volume 5: Spyral's End TP | 168 | Grayson #17–20, Grayson Annual #3, Nightwing: Rebirth #1 | January 4, 2017 | | |
| Green Arrow Volume 8: The Nightbirds TP | 168 | Green Arrow Vol. 5 #41–47, Green Arrow Annual Vol. 5 #1, plus the sneak peek story from Convergence: Speed Force #2 | July 6, 2016 | | |
| Green Arrow Volume 9: Outbreak TP | 200 | Green Arrow Vol. 5 #48–52, Green Arrow Annual Vol. 5 #1 | October 19, 2016 | | |
| Green Lantern Corps: Edge of Oblivion TP | 160 | Green Lantern Corps: Edge of Oblivion #1–6 | November 9, 2016 | | |
| Green Lantern Corps: The Lost Army TP | 152 | Green Lantern: The Lost Army #1–6, plus the sneak peek story from Convergence: Green Arrow #2 | April 6, 2016 | | |
| Green Lantern Volume 7: Renegade HC | 208 | Green Lantern Vol. 5 #41–46, Green Lantern Annual Vol. 5 #4, plus the sneak peek story from Convergence: The Atom #2 | April 20, 2016 | | |
| Green Lantern Volume 8: Reflections HC | 176 | Green Lantern Vol. 5 #47–52, Hal Jordan and the Green Lantern Corps: Rebirth #1 | September 28, 2016 | | |
| Harley Quinn Volume 4: A Call to Arms HC | 176 | Harley Quinn Vol. 2 #17–21, Harley Quinn Road Trip Special #1, plus the sneak peek story from Convergence: Plastic Man and the Freedom Fighters #2 | June 22, 2016 | | |
| Harley Quinn Volume 5: The Joker's Last Laugh HC | 144 | Harley Quinn Vol. 2 #22–25 | September 14, 2016 | | |
| Harley Quinn Volume 6: Black, White and Red All Over HC | 144 | Harley Quinn Vol. 2 #26–30 | January 18, 2017 | | |
| Harley Quinn and Her Gang of Harleys TP | 152 | Harley Quinn and Her Gang of Harleys #1–6 | February 1, 2017 | | |
| Harley Quinn and Power Girl TP | 144 | Harley Quinn and Power Girl #1–6 | March 2, 2016 | | |
| Justice League 3001 Volume 1: Déjà Vu All Over Again TP | 192 | Justice League 3000 #14–15, Justice League 3001 #1–6, plus the sneak peek story from Convergence: Justice League International #2 | March 16, 2016 | | |
| Justice League 3001 Volume 2: Things Fall Apart TP | 144 | Justice League 3001 #7–12 | September 28, 2016 | | |
| Justice League: Darkseid War – Power of the Gods HC | 200 | Justice League: Darkseid War – Batman #1, Justice League: Darkseid War – The Flash #1, Justice League: Darkseid War – Green Lantern #1, Justice League: Darkseid War – Lex Luthor #1, Justice League: Darkseid War – Shazam! #1, Justice League: Darkseid War – Superman #1 | April 20, 2016 | | |
| Justice League Volume 7: Darkseid War Part 1 HC | 176 | Justice League Vol. 2 #40–44, plus a story from DC Comics Divergence #1 | March 9, 2016 | | |
| Justice League Volume 8: The Darkseid War Part 2 HC | 200 | Justice League Vol. 2 #45–50, Justice League: Darkseid War Special #1 | September 21, 2016 | | |
| Justice League of America: Power and Glory HC | 256 | Justice League of America Vol. 4 #1–4, 6–10 | March 15, 2017 | | |
| Justice League United Volume 3: Reunited TP | 160 | Justice League United #11–16 | January 4, 2017 | | |
| Katana: Soultaker Volume 1 TP | 144 | Katana #1-10 and Justice League Dark 23.1 The Creeper. | April 27, 2016 | | |
| Lobo Volume 2: Beware His Might TP | 128 | Lobo #7–9, Lobo Annual #1, plus the sneak peek story from Convergence: Green Lantern/Parallax #2 | April 27, 2016 | | |
| Lobo Volume 3: Paid in Blood TP | 128 | Lobo #10–12, Sinestro #15 | October 19, 2016 | | |
| Martian Manhunter Volume 1: The Epiphany TP | 144 | Martian Manhunter #1–6, plus the sneak peek story from Convergence: Adventures of Superman #2 | February 24, 2016 | | |
| Martian Manhunter Volume 2: The Red Rising TP | 144 | Martian Manhunter #7–12, Justice League of America Vol. 4 #5 | December 14, 2016 | | |
| Metal Men: Full Metal Jacket TP | 144 | Metal Men from Legends of Tomorrow #1–6 | December 21, 2016 | | |
| Metamorpho: Two Worlds, One Destiny TP | 136 | Metamorpho from Legends of Tomorrow #1–6 | December 28, 2016 | | |
| Midnighter Volume 1: Out TP | 144 | Midnighter Vol. 2 #1–7, plus the sneak peek story from Convergence: Nightwing/Oracle #2 | February 17, 2016 | | |
| Midnighter Volume 2: Hard TP | 168 | Midnighter Vol. 2 #8–12, Midnighter Vol. 1 #7–8, plus a story from Young Romance: A New 52 Valentine's Day Special #1 | October 19, 2016 | | |
| New Suicide Squad Volume 2: Monsters TP | 144 | New Suicide Squad #9–12, New Suicide Squad Annual #1, plus the sneak peek story from Convergence: The Flash #2 | February 3, 2016 | | |
| New Suicide Squad Volume 3: Freedom TP | 144 | New Suicide Squad #13–18 | July 27, 2016 | | |
| New Suicide Squad Volume 4: Kill Anything TP | 160 | New Suicide Squad #17–22 | November 16, 2016 | | |
| Poison Ivy: Cycle of Life and Death TP | 144 | Poison Ivy: Cycle of Life and Death #1–6 | September 6, 2016 | | |
| Prez Volume 1: Corndog In Chief TP | 160 | Prez #1–6, plus the sneak peek story from Convergence: Batgirl #2 | February 3, 2016 | | |
| Red Hood/Arsenal Volume 1: Open For Business TP | 144 | Red Hood/Arsenal #1–6, plus the sneak peek story from Convergence: Titans #2 | March 30, 2016 | | |
| Red Hood/Arsenal Volume 2: Dancing with the Devil's Daughter TP | 184 | Red Hood/Arsenal #7–13, Red Hood and the Outlaws: Rebirth #1 | October 12, 2016 | | |
| Robin War HC | 256 | Robin War #1–2, Grayson #15, Detective Comics Vol. 2 #47, We Are... Robin #7, Robin: Son of Batman #7, Gotham Academy #13, Red Hood/Arsenal #7, Teen Titans Vol. 5 #15 | April 13, 2016 | | |
| Robin: Son of Batman Volume 1: Year of Blood HC | 176 | Robin: Son of Batman #1–6, plus the sneak peek story from Convergence: The New Teen Titans #2 | March 23, 2016 | | |
| Robin: Son of Batman Volume 2: Dawn of the Demons HC | 200 | Robin: Son of Batman #7–13 | September 7, 2016 | | |
| Secret Six Volume 1: Friends in Low Places TP | 144 | Secret Six #1–6, plus the sneak peek story from Convergence: Wonder Woman #2 | February 10, 2016 | | |
| Secret Six Volume 2: The Gauntlet TP | 144 | Secret Six #7-14 | January 3, 2017 | | |
| Sinestro Volume 3: Rising TP | 200 | Sinestro #12–15, Lobo #10–11, plus the sneak peek story from Convergence: Action Comics #2 | February 10, 2016 | | |
| Sinestro Volume 4: The Fall of Sinestro TP | 176 | Sinestro #16–23 | November 30, 2016 | | |
| Starfire Volume 1: Welcome Home TP | 160 | Starfire #1–6, plus the sneak peek story from Convergence: The Question #2 | March 23, 2016 | | |
| Starfire Volume 2: A Matter of Time TP | 144 | Starfire #7–12 | January 25, 2017 | | |
| Sugar & Spike: Metahuman Investigations TP | 144 | Sugar & Spike from Legends of Tomorrow #1–6 | November 9, 2016 | | |
| Suicide Squad Most Wanted: Deadshot TP | 144 | Deadshot's stories from Suicide Squad Most Wanted: Deadshot/Katana #1–6 | August 3, 2016 | | |
| Suicide Squad Most Wanted: Katana TP | 144 | Katana's stories from Suicide Squad Most Wanted: Deadshot/Katana #1–6 | September 14, 2016 | | |
| Superman: Action Comics Volume 8: Truth HC | 192 | Action Comics Vol. 2 #41–47, plus the sneak peek story from Convergence: Superboy #2 | July 20, 2016 | | |
| Superman: Action Comics Volume 9: Last Rites HC | 144 | Action Comics Vol. 2 #48–52 | December 21, 2016 | | |
| Superman: Lois & Clark TP | 168 | Superman: Lois & Clark #1–8 | August 31, 2016 | | |
| Superman: Savage Dawn HC | 352 | Superman Annual Vol. 3 #3, Action Comics Vol. 2 #48–50, Superman Vol. 3 #48–50, Superman/Wonder Woman #25–27, 30-31 | October 26, 2016 | | |
| Superman: The Final Days of Superman HC | 200 | Superman Vol. 3 #51–52, Batman/Superman #31–32, Action Comics Vol. 2 #51–52, Superman/Wonder Woman #28–29 | October 26, 2016 | | |
| Superman Volume 1: Before Truth HC | 192 | Superman Vol. 3 #40–44, plus a story from DC Comics Divergence #1 | March 2, 2016 | | |
| Superman Volume 2: Return to Glory HC | 280 | Superman Vol. 3 #45–52, Superman Annual Vol. 3 #3, Superman: Rebirth #1 | September 28, 2016 | | |
| Superman/Wonder Woman Volume 4: Dark Truth HC | 176 | Superman/Wonder Woman #18–24, plus the sneak peek story from Convergence: Justice Society of America #2 | June 8, 2016 | | |
| Superman/Wonder Woman Volume 5: A Savage End HC | 168 | Superman/Wonder Woman #25–29 | December 21, 2016 | | |
| Swamp Thing: The Dead Don't Sleep TP | 144 | Swamp Thing Vol. 6 #1–6 | October 5, 2016 | | |
| Teen Titans Volume 2: Rogue Targets TP | 176 | Teen Titans Vol. 5 #8–12, Teen Titans Annual #1, plus the sneak peek story from Convergence: Superboy and the Legion of Super-Heroes #2 | March 9, 2016 | | |
| Teen Titans Volume 3: The Sum of Its Parts TP | 144 | Teen Titans Vol. 5 #14–19 | August 24, 2016 | | |
| Teen Titans Volume 4: When Titans Fall TP | 184 | Teen Titans Vol. 5 #20–24, Teen Titans Annual Vol. 5 #2, Teen Titans: Rebirth #1 | February 1, 2017 | | |
| Telos TP | 144 | Telos #1–6 | August 31, 2016 | | |
| The Flash Volume 8: Zoom HC | 176 | The Flash Vol. 4 #41–47, The Flash Annual Vol. 4 #4, plus the sneak peek story from Convergence: Detective Comics #2 | August 3, 2016 | | |
| The Flash Volume 9: Full Stop HC | 176 | The Flash Vol. 4 #48–52 | November 16, 2016 | | |
| The Omega Men: The End is Here TP | 288 | The Omega Men #1–12, plus the sneak peek story from Convergence: Batman and Robin #2 | August 24, 2016 | | |
| Titans Hunt TP | 208 | Titans Hunt #1–8, Justice League Vol. 2 #51, Titans: Rebirth #1 | September 14, 2016 | | |
| We Are... Robin Volume 1: The Vigilante Business TP | 160 | We Are... Robin #1–6, plus the sneak peek story from Convergence: World's Finest #2 | March 30, 2016 | | |
| We Are... Robin Volume 2: Jokers TP | 152 | We Are... Robin #7-13 | October 18, 2016 | | |
| Wonder Woman Volume 8: A Twist of Fate HC | 168 | Wonder Woman Vol. 4 #41–47 | April 27, 2016 | | |
| Wonder Woman Volume 9: Resurrection HC | 160 | Wonder Woman Vol. 4 #48–52 | September 14, 2016 | | |
