= Duke Thomas (character) =

- Duke Thomas as depicted in Batman and The Signal (January 2018). Art by Cully Hamner.

Publication information
- Publisher: DC Comics
- First appearance: As Unnamed Child: Batman (vol. 2) #21 (New 52) (March 2014); As Duke Thomas: Batman (vol. 2) #30 (New 52) (October 2014); As Robin: We Are... Robin #1 (May 2015); As The Signal: Batman and The Signal #1 (March 2018)
- Created by: Scott Snyder (writer); Greg Capullo (artist)

In-story information
- Full name: Duke Thomas
- Species: Metahuman
- Team affiliations: Batman Family; Outsiders; Justice League
- Partnerships: Batman; Orphan; Black Lightning; Katana
- Notable aliases: Robin; The Signal, Thomason
- Abilities: See list: Photokinesis; Umbrakinesis; Photokinetic Vision; Advanced electromagnetic spectrum vision; Telescopic vision; Microscopic vision; X-ray vision; Retrocognition; Precognition; Invisibility; Rapid healing; Skilled hand-to-hand combatant and martial artist; Genius-level intellect; Expert detective; Skilled computer hacker; Utilizes high-tech equipment and weapons

Duke Thomas is a fictional character appearing in American comic books published by DC Comics. He was created by Scott Snyder and Greg Capullo. He was introduced as a supporting character of Batman, his first appearance being in 2013 in Batman (vol. 2) #21, before later leading a youth vigilante movement inspired by Robin, in the comic book We Are... Robin, in May 2015. He officially became Batman's newest partner and joined the Batman family in 2016.

The character would be a staple in Batman comics and Detective Comics, and went on in a new role as Gotham's daylight protector, The Signal.

Duke made his animated debut as Robin in the animated series Batwheels, voiced by AJ Hudson.

== Publication history ==
Duke Thomas first appeared as an unnamed child in Batman (vol. 2) #21 (March 2014), being saved by Batman. His first official named appearance was in Batman (vol. 2) #30, revealing they had met before his prior appearance, as his parents saved Bruce Wayne's life.

He did not appear in comics again until Batman: Endgame (October 2014), where the Joker abducted him and his parents in an attempt to psychologically torture Batman. He returns as a staple in DC Comics in We Are... Robin, joining the teen vigilante group and being trained by previous official Robins during Robin War. His official debut as a part of the Batman family occurred in 2016, with Batman: Rebirth #1. He later dons a new mantle as "The Signal" in the mini series Batman and The Signal.

He is currently a staple in Batman comics and comics featuring the Outsiders.

== Fictional character biography ==
=== Batman: Zero Year ===
Duke's first appearance is as an unnamed child, fishing in the derelict Gotham City. He is approached by thugs wanting to take his food, who are stopped by the sudden appearance of Batman. Duke tells him that the Riddler claims that he is dead, to which Batman replies that it means he will not see him coming.

=== Batman: Endgame ===
The Joker releases a deadly pathogen on Gotham City that mimics his laugh gas on a much larger scale. In the ensuing pandemonium, he kidnaps the Thomas family due to their connection with Bruce Wayne. He sets up an elaborate stage on which to reenact the night the Waynes died, even going as far as to use an infected Joe Chill, the man who originally killed his parents, to emotionally torture Bruce. Duke is narrowly saved by Batman, but is forced to leave his parents behind to an infected mob.

=== We Are... Robin ===
Several months later, Duke is in the foster care system. He rebels as he feels frustrated by the lack of care and empathy the city has been granting to the Joker's victims, resulting in his parents still being missing. Alongside this, Gotham City appears to have been abandoned by Batman. Alfred Pennyworth has secretly been supplying teens fighting back against crime and corruption with Robin insignia and instructions via an app called "The Nest", starting the group known as We Are Robin.

After assisting the group, Duke is approached by Alfred, disguised as a police interrogator. He encourages Duke to take his life into his own hands and to fight for the fate of the city, offering him help finding his parents if he helps stop a cult from detonating bombs around the city. Duke accepts, making him an unofficial Robin. He leads part of the group to the bombs inside a train station. While the rest of the group is above ground fighting off the cultists, they are able to defuse one bomb. As they debate about how to defuse the second, they are sent a message from The Nest, telling them to give up and get on the next train. Meanwhile, above ground the GCPD reveals a "new" Batman, who is simply Jim Gordon in a robotic suit. He is instructed to treat the Robins as criminals. One member, Troy, stays behind, and attempts to defuse the bomb in the same manner as the first one, causing it to detonate and kill him. Duke and his new friends are devastated, and become suspicious of The Nest, until Alfred provides them gear, and draws on their individual experiences to encourage them to keep fighting for their city.

After the events of Robin War, most Robins go back to their normal lives. Duke resumes his search for his parents and finds that they were permanently damaged by the Joker virus. Meanwhile, John "Smiley" Bender Jr., a teen with Möbius syndrome, whose parents forced him into surgery that left him with a permanent smile, kills them after getting out of juvie. Holding the Joker as an idol, he starts a gang and begins terrorizing Gotham. Smiley invades Duke's school, forcing him and his friends to take action. After taking him down, the group is approached by Alfred and renounce being Robins, deciding to rely on themselves and each other.

=== Robin War ===
Shortly after Troy's death, a Robin outside of Duke's group accidentally kills a robber and police officer. Combining the two with public push, the Robin laws go into effect, making it illegal for teens to wear the Robin colors and insignia. These events were engineered by the Court of Owls, as the councilwoman who headed the legislation, Noctua, wishes to earn a place in the society.

Duke hosts a meeting of the remaining Robins, calling for whoever accidentally committed the crime to come forward. However the real Robin, Damian Wayne, crashes the meeting. Objecting to the use of his title while he was away, he challenges the Robins to prove themselves in a fight against him. The commotion is noticed by the GCPD, who send "Batman" to deal with them. He is quickly struck down by Damian, but before the fight can resume, Red Hood and Red Robin put a stop to it. They calm Damian down and call the first Robin, Dick Grayson.

Travis, one of the Robins, tells Duke that he was the one who killed the officer and robber. Duke seeing that it was an accident and that Travis is burdened by the guilt, encourages him to turn himself in and Travis agrees. While on his way, Travis is killed by a Talon to sow more public unrest. The official Robins train the group. Despite having faked his death and using a face changer, Duke recognizes Dick Grayson and reveals this during a training session. Duke and his friends are chosen as the best of the group, and are taken on a mission to try and get information. However, Dick has been feeding information to the police, as to have the Robins arrested and safe from the Court of Owls.

The original Robins, with help from Duke and his friends, break out and free the rest of the Robins. They tell the others to go home, as the Court of Owls is too deadly of an enemy for them. Thanks to information from Duke's friend Riko, they make their way to Gotham Academy. On the way, Damian sneaks away and is manipulated into joining the Court to protect Gotham. He, alongside several Talons, fight against the others once they reach Gotham Academy, seeming to take them out with ease. Duke refuses to believe that Damian has genuinely joined the Court, getting back up to continue fighting him. He calls Damian by name, saying that he knows of Bruce Wayne's amnesia as the result of sacrificing himself, and how Damian does not need to live up to that. This causes Damian to snap out of the Court's manipulations. The Robins that went home see the destruction throughout the city. They decide to rally once more and the tides turn against the Court, temporarily sending them back underground.

=== Batman Vol 9: Bloom ===
After Robin War, the villain Mr. Bloom begins distributing experimental devices that give the user powers, but are likely to kill their host. After overhearing a conversation between Bruce and Jim Gordon, Duke becomes drawn to the mystery. He steals a neutralized device given to Bruce, as Bruce is reluctant to be involved in the case. He first shows the device to his older friend Daryl Gutierrez, a tech genius working as an engineer for the GCPD, who is unable to identify it.

Duke turns to other sources, tracking a trail to the Penguin's Iceberg Lounge. He finds a book containing information on Penguin's investigations on Bloom. The Penguin and his gang find Duke in the study, nearly capturing him. He barely escapes, only to be seemly apprehended by guards outside. Until Bruce Wayne takes them down. Bruce had discovered the device missing, and since Duke had used the Fox Center's computers for his research, was able to deduce what he was doing and follow him.

He expresses concern for Duke, he continues to press when Duke tries to avoid the conversation, asking why Duke has treated him coldly. Duke becomes upset, as he is aware of Bruce's former identity as Batman while Bruce is not. He tells Bruce that he does not take a real look at his life, saying that his denial is based in selfishness. He tells Bruce that anyone can be who he is now, but in his old life only he could be him, and that he used to inspire the whole city. He continues with his speech, causing a spark in Bruce's memory when he saves Duke from an incoming train. Duke, feeling no better, tells Bruce to stay away.

Duke tells Daryl that it almost made him give up hope and vigilantism entirely, however, he went over the evidence he stole from the Iceberg Lounge one last time, and noticed that it contained the names of the nominees for the grant that Daryl won years before. He asks Daryl what is going on, Daryl snaps and his form begins to mutate to where he looks eerily similar to Bloom. He reveals that he was the "original" Bloom, having initially created the devices after Zero Year, believing that with powers people would band together to protect each other. However, his first test with his cousin yielded fatal results, which made Daryl burn the remaining devices.

After Batman's disappearance following Endgame, he turned towards his experiments again. This time using unidentified and near death patients. There was only one success, who became horrifically deformed, and slaughtered the other patients. The patient somehow recognized Daryl as the source of what happened to them, and decided to take the Bloom moniker, along with the rest of the devices.

Daryl insists that he can stop Bloom and perfect the devices. Duke tries to reason with him, saying that powers are not necessary and all you need is good people. Daryl mocks him and the Robin movement. He moves to take and dispose of a Robin pin that Duke gave him, but Duke takes advantage of his distraction to incapacitate him and take control of the airship.

During Daryl's confession, Bloom has begun widespread havoc across the city. Introducing handpicked convicts they have used the devices on. They inform the populace that they have hidden devices all over the city, and that they now have a programmed thrall to encourage their use, as the use of them makes Bloom stronger. Along with sabotaging the GCPD's atom collider, which could cause a black hole.

Duke directs the airship to where Bruce, having remembered being Batman, is struggling to hold them off. Duke uses the high powered magnets in the ship to grab onto Bloom. The more Bloom struggles, the stronger the magnets get. This also disables the thrall, leading to people removing their devices and diverting power from Bloom. Gordon uses a dampener on the collider, and the resounding shock wave kills Bloom. Duke is approached by Bruce, who offers to train him as an official vigilante.

=== All-Star Batman ===
Duke becomes an official member of the Batman Family. After accepting Bruce's offer to train under him, Duke moves into Wayne Manor and begins working alongside all of Gotham's vigilantes. He is a heavy feature in All-Star Batman, assisting Bruce in dealing with Two-Face, Victor Zsasz, Hugo Strange, and Mr. Freeze.

=== Dark Days: The Road to Metal ===
Leading into the events of Dark Nights: Metal, while Batman was on a mission related to the mysteries surrounding Nth Metal, Duke was tasked to guard the Batcave. This led to a confrontation with the Green Lantern, Hal Jordan, who had been sent by the Guardians of the Universe to investigate sinister cosmic omens pointing to that location. Duke joined the investigation and together they found a secret level of the Batcave. In the hidden level were various clues that Batman had collected and stored over the years related to Nth Metal, as well as a prison holding the Joker.

The Joker taunts the heroes into freeing him using the secrets he has learned from the cave. He reveals the origins of metahumans, and that Batman recruited Duke because Duke and his mother are metahumans who are connected to a "Dark Crisis". In the chaos of their fight, The Joker destroyed Batman's machines before escaping the two heroes and vanishing from the cave entirely. Batman arrives and confirms there is some truth to what the Joker said. Duke's powers begin to manifest, and using a Green Lantern ring and the power of the Shazam's dagger, the trio unknowingly set off the chain of events leading to the invasion of Barbatos and the Dark Multiverse.

=== Batman & The Signal ===
After studying under Batman for over a year, Bruce surprised him with his very own base of operation and an upgraded suit; congratulating him for completing his training. Duke took the codename Signal and became the daylight protector of Gotham, recruiting his former Robin gang teammates Riko Sheridan and Izzy Ortiz for technical support.

Duke's first solo mission as Signal was to investigate the sudden spike in dead metahuman bodies being discovered all throughout The Narrows. This led Signal into conflict with The Null, a metahuman from the Arkham Juvenile Detention Center aka "Juvie Arkham". After defeating Null, Signal decided to investigate further into Juvie Arkham, which had once been the old Gotham solarium before being reworked to house metahuman delinquents. Duke used his Ghost Vision to infiltrate Juvie Arkham and walked straight into an ambush. Luckily, Detective Aisi arrived just in time to help Signal make a narrow escape.

Later, Signal met up with Aisi to compare notes. Using his photokinetic sight to examine a tissue sample from one of the dead metahumans, Signal discovered trace amounts of Nth metal embedded in the skin of the sample. The metal and the sample appeared to be react Duke but also to something in the air. That is when Signal noticed a strange solar pattern radiating from the Gotham Proper housing project. Signal theorized someone must be using Gotham Proper to direct supercharged solar energy toward different sections of the city like a sundial, creating unstable metahumans across The Narrows.

Duke returns to the Batcave to bring his new theory to Bruce when the bat-computer is hijacked by someone calling himself Gnomon. He shows them a live broadcasts of The Narrows overrun with innumerable metahumans, all chanting Duke's name, as they wreak havoc across the city. Gnomon reveals that he is the one creating the metahumans. Gnomon claimed to have created the metahumans for Duke as a gift, asking Duke to join him. Duke and Bruce head out as Batman and Signal to stop the villain.

When Batman and The Signal arrive on the scene the Batfamily are spread thin. The duo split up, with Duke making his way to confront Gnomon at Gotham Proper. Signal arrived at Gotham Proper just as Detective Aisi and the GCPD cleared the area, and the two enter the building to confront Gnomon together. In the solar observatory, Gnomon reveals he is Duke's father and that years ago his mother, Elaine, fled to Gotham to hide Duke from him. Signal can sense everything Gnomon says is true due to their genetic connection but summons the resolve to stop Gnomon anyway. Signal, with the help of Detective Aisi, manages to defeat Gnomon, who manages to escape capture.

=== The Outsiders ===
Some time after the events of Justice League: No Justice, the villain Karma lured Duke into a trap that blew up a building, killing a civilian, in the process. This attack left Duke in critical condition and kicked off a series of terrorist attacks by the villain to isolate Batman him from his allies. Batman responded by re-forming the Outsiders and conceded leadership of the group to Black Lightning, fearing he might compromise the team. Enlisting the help of Katana, Cassandra Cain, and a recovered Duke, the Outsiders took down Karma and officially forming the newest iteration of the Outsiders.

Still traumatized from the Karma attack, Duke and the Outsiders are involved in a proxy war between Batman and Ra's al Ghul over the metahuman Sofia Ramos. Ra's manipulates the Outsiders, planting the cyborg Kaliber in their ranks to get to Sofia to keep them busy and disrupt their team.

With Katana and Black Lightning preoccupied by Sofia Ramos and Kaliber, Duke is captured by Ra's' acolyte Ishmael. Ishmael reveals he was reborn in the Lazarus Pit, changing his initial ability to steal metahuman powers into the ability to evolve and change metahuman powers. Ishmael and Ra's see potential in Duke and plan to use Ishmael's powers to evolve Duke's powers for Ra's ends. Ishmael chained, beat Duke and modifies his metahuman abilities, allowing him to manipulate darkness as well as light.

=== Death Metal ===
During the events of Death Metal, Signal, Orphan, Spoiler, and Red Robin fight to reclaim the Narrows in Gotham City. Guarding the area is Quietus, an amalgamation of Duke Thomas, Ra's al Ghul, and Batman originating from a universe in the Dark Multiverse. Quietus initially overpowers Duke and his team, using the waters of the Lazarus Pits to torture Duke with twisted visions of his history from the Dark Multiverse. Duke perseveres and defeats Quietus, reclaiming the Narrows.

== Powers and abilities ==
Duke Thomas is a metahuman with the photokinetic ability to absorb, redistribute and manipulate both light and darkness. Duke's most notable ability is his "Ghost Vision", a power which allows him to perceive the "ghosts" of photons and see a few minutes into the past. He can also utilize this ability to discern where light particles will end up in the future. Duke has enhanced vision, which allows him to perceive the electromagnetic spectrum, see through walls, and see extremely small objects down to the subdermal level. He can perceive and interpret light originating from across dimensional and temporal boundaries under the right conditions. He can also manipulate the light around him to illuminate his surroundings and become invisible.

Duke's photokinetic powers grant him the ability to manipulate shadows, as well as darkness itself. Duke can siphon darkness in the same way that he absorbs light, describing this power as "behaving like a tide" that pushes and pulls shadows toward himself. Duke can travel to different locations via shadows, which he can utilize to coordinate attacks with his allies or make hasty escapes. He can charge the darkness that he generates and then direct it to attack or ensnare his opponents; when charged, the darkness sparks with a photoelectric effect.

By combining all of his photokinetic abilities, Duke can envision a path and then move using light and shadows to near instantly traverse that distance. When using this ability everything around Duke appears to slow to a standstill.

Gnomon, Duke's biological father, claims to be an immortal of over a thousand years and has stated that Duke possesses his "infinite blood"; this implies that he may possess similar immortality. This claim is supported when it is discovered that Duke's powers allow him to heal rapidly in dire situations.

=== Skills and training ===
Duke's greatest asset is his prodigious intellect as well as his capacity for leadership. As a child, he mentally trained himself with riddles and puzzles, hoping to eventually present the Riddler with a riddle even he was not capable of solving. Duke was a child prodigy, going on to compete for a Genius Grant against the likes of gifted engineer Daryl Gutierrez (Mr. Bloom) when he was twelve years old. His intellect makes him a skilled detective, allowing him to eventually discern the identities of Bruce Wayne as Batman, Dick Grayson as Agent 37, Damian Wayne as Robin and Alfred as "The Nest" behind the "We Are Robin" movement. He developed into a charismatic leader, able to regularly gain the trust and loyalty of others and persuade them to support his causes. Under his guidance, Duke's faction of the Robin gang achieved a level of prominence that surpassed all of the others, becoming the driving force behind the entire "We Are Robin" movement. His ability to coordinate and rally those under his command makes him a formidable field commander, even when working with other, more experienced Bat-family members. Duke's knack for leadership has been recognized by Batman, who has been specifically preparing Duke to assume Justice League-level leadership.

Duke is a highly skilled and relatively seasoned hand-to-hand combatant. He has demonstrated considerable fighting skills, which allow him to hold his own against multiple opponents at once despite not having had access to proper training. As part of the "We Are Robin" gang, Duke became proficient in the use of nunchaku and received training from Agent 37, Red Hood, Red Robin and Robin during the events of Robin War. After departing the Robin movement, Duke received direct training from Bruce Wayne and studied every discipline he'd mastered to become Batman, including training in various martial arts and gaining access to drives that contained all of Batman's accumulated contingency plans, journal entries and personal insights over the years. Duke's precognition and enhanced visual senses make him uniquely intuitive in a fight; they enable him to detect weak points and react to attacks faster than normally possible by slowing down his perception. He can even slow his perception down to the point that he can catch flying projectiles. Since joining the Outsiders, Duke's training has been overseen by both Katana and Black Lightning; he spars with both as well as Batgirl and Metamorpho on a regular basis. During his tenure with the Outsiders, Lady Shiva took a personal interest in Duke's development and mentored him to utilize his abilities more effectively. Duke can combine his umbrakinetic powers with his martial arts in order to enhance his aptitude in melee combat.

== Other versions ==
- An alternate universe version of Duke Thomas who became Robin following Damian Wayne's death appears in The New 52: Futures End.
- An alternate universe version of Duke Thomas appears in Batman: White Knight. This version is an ex-special forces soldier who runs a youth group and united several local gangs under his guidance to protect Gotham's Backport sector.
- An alternate universe version of Duke Thomas appears in Tales from the Dark Multiverse. This version killed Barbatos and forged his body into armor before devoting himself to fighting the monsters of the Dark Multiverse using the Parall-Axe, an axe that can harness the Emotional Spectrum.
- An alternate universe version of Duke Thomas appears in Future State. This version is part of a resistance against the Magistrate that rules Gotham and wields the Soultaker sword, which houses Jefferson Pierce's cursed spirit.

== Supporting characters ==
Duke has a number of supporting characters such as Detective Aisi, Izzy Ortiz, Riko Sheridan, and the rest of his former We Are Robin gang.

=== Family ===
Duke's family, particularly his mother Elaine Thomas, are key to his character. Elaine's mysterious past, and Duke's biological father being revealed to be Gnomon, have made Duke a person of interested to various immortals throughout the DC Universe, such as Talia al Ghul, Ra's al Ghul and The Immortal Man. Duke eventually moved to The Narrows to live with his cousin Jay, after training under Batman and living at Wayne Manor as a ward.

=== Enemies ===
- Mr. Bloom (Daryl Gutierrez) - Duke's childhood friend and former GCPD engineer turned biokinetic villain. Bloom became obsessed with the mystery of Duke's genetics after the events of Superheavy.
- Gnomon - Duke's seemingly immortal biological father. Gnomon was using the sun to create metahumans across Gotham in Duke's name, including the metahuman delinquents of Juvie Arkham.
  - The Null - The lead Juvie Arkham delinquent with the ability to create negative space, fill it with nullifying energy, and then wield it like a weapon.
  - Palette - A delinquent with the ability to convert particles into black holes to create miniature universes in the form of weaponized finger paint.
  - Killjoy - A delinquent with the ability to produce knives from her metallic skin and throw them with great accuracy.
- Ra's al Ghul - Ra's and Talia al Ghuls refer to Duke as a "potential" and have taken a particular interest in Duke's metahuman abilities. Ra's was the main antagonist during Duke's initial run with the Outsiders, even sending Ishmael to capture Duke to make him into one of his acolytes.
  - Ishmael - Ra's' metahuman enforcer and loyal acolyte. Ishmael has the ability to steal or modify powers of other metahumans.
- Quietus - A Dark Multiverse amalgamation of Duke Thomas, Batman, and Ra's al Ghul.

== Collected editions ==
Title	Material collected	Pages	ISBN
We Are Robin Vol. 1: Vigilante Business	We Are Robin #1-6; DC Sneak Peek: We Are Robin #1.	127	978-1401259822
We Are Robin Vol 2: Jokers	We Are Robin #7-13	154	978-1401272791
Limited Series
Batman & The Signal Vol. 1	Batman and The Signal #1-3; All-Star Batman #1-4, #6-9; New Talent Showcase 2017 #1	164	978-1401279677

|978-1401279677 |DC POWER 2024.

== In other media ==
=== Television ===
- Duke Thomas appears in a photograph depicted in the Titans episode "Barbara Gordon".
- Duke Thomas as Robin appears in Batwheels, voiced by AJ Hudson.

=== Webtoons ===
Duke Thomas appears in the webtoon Batman: Wayne Family Adventures. This version initially refused to use his powers in crime-fighting in an attempt to prove himself and fit in with the powerless Bat-Family. Duke reconsiders his views after being motivated by Luke Fox.
