= Starborn =

Comic book superhero

Starborn (Benjamin Warner) is a superhero that appears in American comic books published by Boom! Studios. The character was created by writer-editor Stan Lee with Chris Roberson and Khary Randolph. The character first appeared in Starborn #1 (December 2010).
