= Mr. Bloom =

Supervillain appearing in Batman

Publication information
- Publisher: DC Comics
- First appearance: Batman (Vol. 2) #43 (August 12, 2015)
- Created by: Scott Snyder; Greg Capullo

In-story information
- Alter ego: Unknown
- Species: Metahuman
- Team affiliations: Task Force Z
- Abilities: Size manipulation; Pyrokinesis; Electricity; Technology expert

Mr. Bloom is a supervillain that appears in American comic books published by DC Comics, debuting in Batman (Vol. 2) #43 in 2015. Mr. Bloom's creators, Scott Snyder and Greg Capullo, referred to him as the anti-Joker. He is the main antagonist of the 2014-15 "Superheavy" story arc, during Commissioner Jim Gordon's temporary tenure as a heavily armored law-endorsed replacement of Batman, and later returns as the antagonist of the 2021 maxiseries Task Force Z, in which he comes into conflict with Red Hood and a team of zombified versions of Batman's Rogues Gallery.

== Fictional character biography ==
After Jim Gordon takes on the role of Batman, he begins investigating dead criminals who possessed their powers for a brief period, leading him to Mr. Bloom. Mr. Bloom considered Gordon's predecessor, Bruce Wayne, as a "wild flower", similar to himself, who operates outside of societal constraints to improve the world. His goal is to murder everyone in Gotham City to start all over again. It is revealed that Mr. Bloom was once a test subject of inventor Daryl Gutierrez and turned into the persona after stealing seeds that can grant powers from Gutierrez. Jim Gordon was unable to defeat Mr. Bloom by himself, leading to the original Batman returning to defeat the villain with a giant robotic suit alongside Gordon.

Mr. Bloom returned in Task Force Z #1 in November 2021, working with Red Hood and reanimated corpses of Batman villains to rehabilitate himself.

== Creation and development ==
Mr. Bloom debuted in Batman #43 in 2015 by Scott Snyder and Greg Capullo. It was revealed that the villain has been active for a while as shown in Batman #44. Mr. Bloom fights against Gordon as the new Batman when Wayne goes missing after the events of "Batman: Endgame".

Capullo initially thought that Snyder's idea of having a flower on Mr. Bloom's face did not look too dangerous. Capullo said: "But one of the things that Scott kept saying was that he was like a weed, so I wanted to pursue that angle. I thought I could make that look creepy". Snyder referred to Mr. Bloom as the "anti-Joker" and said that giving the Joker an origin would cheapen such a terrifying character, while Mr. Bloom's anonymity makes the character "almost an inversion of that". Snyder said: "What's scary about Mr. Bloom is that anybody disaffected enough or angry enough at things not working and the machine of Gotham breaking down could become Mr. Bloom with the right push".

On the other hand, you have a villain that grows like a weed in the cracks—the chasms that grow between different communities, between rich and poor, between different races, different classes, all of that. And that's what makes Mr. Bloom so scary. He's a reflection of what can go very wrong.

— Greg Capullo

== Powers and abilities ==
Mr. Bloom is able to survive major injuries, including a gunshot in the head. He is able to manipulate his body by changing his size, turning his fingers into claws, and using electricity as well as pyrokinesis with his fingers. The character used a device to control robots in the vicinity. He has seeds that grant supernatural powers to people, but those seeds contain radiation that Mr. Bloom can use to murder them and each activation of a seed gives Mr. Bloom more power.
