= We Are Robin =

American comic book series

Publication information
- Publisher: DC Comics
- Schedule: Monthly
- Genre: Superhero
- Publication date: June 2015 – May 2016
- No. of issues: 12

Creative team
- Written by: Lee Bermejo
- Artist(s): Rob Haynes; Khary Randolph

We Are Robin was a comic book series published by the comic book publishing company DC Comics with Lee Bermejo as dual artist and writer, along with other artists Rob Haynes, Jorge Corona, and Khary Randolph. The first issue was released in June 2015 and the last issued in May 2016. It took place after Batman: Endgame while Bruce Wayne had amnesia and was unable to resume his mantle of Batman. The name "We Are Robin" also plays into the current Robin being away from the city, with teens filling in the gap both heroes left. It would lead into the 2016 crossover event Robin War, which crossed over with Red Hood and the Outlaws and the main Batman title, while Commissioner Jim Gordon held the mantle of the Dark Knight in Wayne's absence, which concluded the storyline.

== Background ==
Batman: Noël writer Lee Bermejo explains We Are Robin is a new approach to showcase diversity in the DC Universe for readers. On the subject of expanding the character of Robin, he explained: "With ideas and big concepts, teenagers can get really passionate about that stuff and it can be their whole life. That was something interesting to me, that this thing could be bigger than just one guy jumping around in a domino mask".

According to Bermejo, his inspiration for the series came from the question of why Batman would put a child out on the streets to fight crime, thus risking placing him in danger. While We Are Robin does not focus on past Robins Dick Grayson, Jason Todd, Tim Drake, Stephanie Brown, or the incumbent Damian Wayne, Bermejo did not rule out including them in the future. By bringing in different characters as Robin, Bermejo hopes to create a different dynamic with the identity: "You can take that concept of Robin and really play with it and really stretch it and expand upon it and bend it. It still will hold resemblance to the core of the character in the Bat-mythos".

== Plot ==
Duke Thomas, a victim of the Joker, attempts to search for his family in the months following Batman: Endgame, becoming a delinquent due to being forced to live on the streets.

While being arrested, a teenage girl takes a photo of him and sends it to a group chat with the caption "found him". Duke is placed into a new foster home, while the members of the group chat argue about whether to include him in a mysterious group. A member titled "The Nest" overrules them for his enrollment. Duke sneaks out, and is followed by several unseen members.

Duke makes his way into the sewers, and follows two people who allude to being in a cult like group. He finds an underground town in a cavern, where many people are being preached to by a man. The man speaks of a terrorist plot to destroy Gotham City, and alludes to a King that presides over the group orders it, and he is merely a mouth piece. During this speech, Duke is singled out as an outsider, and everyone in the cavern attempts to attack him. He is saved by the group that followed him, finally revealing their name "We Are Robin".

An unknown man uses hidden cameras to watch the Robins fight, in a monologue, he admits to being the organizer and benefactor of the Robin group, revealing a cache of gear and outfits.

== Collected editions ==
Title	Material collected	Published date	ISBN
We Are Robin Vol. 1: The Vigilante Business	We Are Robin #1-6	April 2016	978-1401259822
We Are Robin Vol. 2: Jokers	We Are Robin #7-12	October 2016	978-1401264901

== In other media ==
Members of the team "We Are Robin" including Daxton Chill and Duke Thomas appear, along with Carrie Kelley and Stephanie Brown, as photographs in the third season of Titans in the first episode "Barbara Gordon" when former Robin Dick Grayson goes through Bruce Wayne's computer and confronts Bruce about him searching for a replacement for recently deceased Robin Jason Todd.

== See also ==
- List of Batman comics
