= Robin War =

DC Comics storyline

- Promotional Image for "Robin War"

Publication information
- Publisher: DC Comics
- Genre: Crossover
- Publication date: December 2015 – January 2016
- Main character(s): Robin, Court of Owls

Creative team
- Written by: Tom King, Tim Seeley, Ray Fawkes, Lee Bermejo, Patrick Gleason, Brendan Fletcher, Scott Lobdell, Will Pfeifer
- Artist(s): Khary Randolph, Alain Mauricet, Jorge Corona, Andres Guinaldo, Walden Wong, Mikel Janín, Steve Pugh, Carmine Di Giandomenico, Scott McDaniel, Micuel Mendonca, Adam Archer, Javi Fernandez, Alvaro Martinez, Raul Fernandez

"Robin War" is a comic book crossover storyline published by the comic book publishing company DC Comics. The event ran from December 2015 to January 2016 in the books Robin War, Grayson, Detective Comics, We Are Robin, Robin, Son of Batman, Gotham Academy, Red Hood/Arsenal, and Teen Titans. The series features numerous incarnations of Batman's crime-fighting partner, Robin, including Damian Wayne, Tim Drake, Jason Todd and the original, Dick Grayson.

== Plot summary ==
A young member of the We Are Robin movement named Travis sparks a citywide response to teenage vigilantes called "The Robin Laws", which make any visual or verbal identification with the movement illegal. Councilwoman Noctua spearheads the legislation, doing so to earn her place in the Court of Owls. Duke Thomas, leader of one of the cells of the movement, calls a meeting, which is interrupted by Damian Wayne, current Robin, who objects rather violently to anyone else claiming the title. James Gordon, current Batman, protests Noctua's orders to capture all of the Robins, but follows them when she refuses to relent. Damian takes him down, and Tim Drake and Jason Todd intervene, telling Damian to wait for Dick Grayson, the original Robin, current agent of Spyral. The Court of Owls murders Travis before he can follow Duke's guidance and stop the escalation of the war by turning himself in.

Dick, Jason, Tim, and Damian train the Robin movement and lead them on several missions, all of which turn out to be Dick's plan to have the authorities capture all of the Robins except himself to keep them safe. They are taken to a vast secret prison facility nicknamed "The Cage" which houses a large number of aerial barred cells reminiscent of bird cages. Grayson runs into Gordon, and together, they determine that Noctua seems to be benefitting from the war. The Cage is taken over by the Owls, who force Tim and Jason to fight to the death. Instead, they release all of the Robins from the cages and begin an assault on the Owl's forces of Talons.

The fight leads the Robins underneath Gotham Academy, where Elite Talons, berserkers devised to destroy Gotham if the Court lost control, are hatching. Batman, having split up from Grayson, shows up to stop the Talons, while Grayson meets with Lincoln March, who was released from the Court's punishment for his betrayal of them during Batman Eternal to carry out his plan to ensnare Grayson as one of their agents. They've convinced Damian to join them to save Gotham as a ploy for Grayson to save the younger Robin by joining himself. Gordon and the Robins manage to destroy the Elite Talons, but Grayson joins the Owls to save Damian and end the war. Duke and Damian seem to become friends as the aftermath of their ordeals. As Dick meets with his brothers in the Batcave and explains his whereabouts during the fight with the Elite Talons, Jason, Tim and Damian voice their concerns about trusting Dick when they feel he isn't being honest. Dick reconfirms his dedication to his brothers and reasserts himself as the leader, by reminding the three about why they have followed Bruce through it all in the first place: Family. Afterwards, Grayson is welcomed to the newly expanded, international Parliament of Owls, as he complies and says, "I'm not Robin".

== Main titles ==
- Robin War #1
- Grayson #15
- Detective Comics #47
- We Are Robin #7
- Robin: Son of Batman #7
- Robin War #2

== Tie-ins ==
- Gotham Academy #13
- Red Hood/Arsenal #7
- Teen Titans #15

== Collected edition ==
Title	Material collected	Published date	ISBN
Robin War	Robin War #1-2, Robin: Son of Batman #7, Grayson #15, Detective Comics #47, We Are Robin #7, Gotham Academy #13, Red Hood/Arsenal #7, Teen Titans #15	April 2016	978-1401262082
