= Khary Randolph =

American comic book artist

- Born: January 10, 1979 (age 47) Boston, Massachusetts, U.S.
- Areas: Penciller, Artist, Inker
- Notable works: Starborn; Charismagic; Tech Jacket; Mosaic; Excellence
- Awards: Glyph Comics Awards (x3)

Khary Randolph (born January 10, 1979) is an American comic book artist. He has worked on such series as Starborn, Charismagic, Tech Jacket, Mosaic, and Excellence; and for such publishers as Marvel Comics, Epic Comics, DC Comics, Aspen Comics, Image Comics, and Boom! Studios.

== Biography ==
Born and raised in Boston, Randolph lives in Brooklyn, New York.

In an interview with Bleeding Cool, Randolph discussed his influences growing up:

I was always into the nerdy stuff – comics, video games, cartoons/anime. Escapism was the name of the game when you lived in the neighborhood I grew up with. . . . Even as a kid I was always analyzing things and trying to come up with ways that I would do them differently. . . . I wasn't the typical comic book fan at first. I was aware of Marvel and DC but they didn't really connect with me until I was a teenager. My first comic book love was Teenage Mutant Ninja Turtles and I pored over those books until they were literally falling apart. All of the great mainstream books of the 80s I had to discover much, much later. . . . The real turning point for me, however, was Image Comics. The art and the production values on those early books, specifically the colors, hit me like a ton of bricks. Youngblood, Cyberforce, WildCATS, Spawn – It was like nothing I had seen before, like truly next-level stuff. And plus, the way Wizard covered those creators back in the early 90s made them seem like true rock stars. It was over after that. I wanted that life.

Randolph graduated from the School of Visual Arts in 2000 with a BFA in Cartooning & Illustration.

His first published comic work was Spider-Man: Legend of the Spider-Clan #5, published by Marvel in 2003.

He was a guest at the 2006 edition of the Big Apple Comic Con's National Comic Book, Art, Toy & Sci-Fi Expo.

Randolph illustrated cards for the Chaotic Trading Card Game, released in 2007, alongside frequent collaborator Emilio Lopez.

Randolph worked on We Are Robin, which launched in June 2015, with writer Lee Bermejo and artist Rob Haynes, which detailed multiple teenagers in Gotham City who take up the mantle of Robin.

From 2013 to 2015, he created covers for DC Comics' Batman Beyond Universe. In 2016, Randolph created covers for Black Mask Studios' Black.

In 2019, he and writer Brandon Thomas launched the creator-owned series Excellence with Image Comics/Skybound Entertainment. Excellence, created entirely by people of color, is about a secret society of black magicians.

== Art style ==
Randolph is known for his dynamic art style which shows influence from manga and hip hop.

== Awards ==
- 2017 Glyph Comics Award for "Best Cover" for Black No. 1
- 2019 Glyph Comics Awards:
  - "Best Artist"
  - "Best Cover" for Noble, Vol 2: Never Events

== Exhibitions ==
- 2019 "Black / Excellence: The Art of Khary Randolph," New York City College of Technology Communication Design Center (Brooklyn, New York)

== Bibliography (selected) ==
=== Comics ===
- Amazing Fantasy #15: "Monstro" (with Robert Kirkman, Marvel, 2006)
- Batman Black and White No. 6 (with Brandon Thomas, DC Comics, May 2021)
- Charismagic #1–6 (with Vince Hernandez, Aspen Comics, 2011–2012)
- Deadpool: The Gauntlet No. 9, "Gangs of New York" (with Gerry Duggan and Brian Posehn, Marvel Comics, 2014)
- Epic Anthology: "Sleepwalker: New Beginnings" (with Robert Kirkman, Epic Comics, 2004)
- Excellence (with Brandon Thomas, Image Comics/Skybound Entertainment, 2019)
- Marvel NOW! 2.0: Mosaic #1–8 (with Geoffrey Thorne, Marvel Comics, October 2016–May 2017)
- Peter Parker: Spider-Man No. 55 (with Zeb Wells and Wayne Faucher, Marvel, June 2003)
- Robin War #1–2 (with Tom King, DC Comics, 2016)
- Spawn No. 198 (with Todd McFarlane, Image Comics, July 2010)
- Spider-Man: Legend of the Spider-Clan #5 (with Kaare Andrews and Skottie Young, Marvel Comics, April 2003)
- Starborn #1–9, 11–12 (with Chris Roberson and Matteo Scalera, Boom! Studios, 2010-2012)
- Tech Jacket #1–12 (with Joe Keatinge, Image, 2014–2015)
- Teen Titans Go! No. 22 (with J. Torres, DC Comics, October 2005)
- We Are... Robin No. 1 (with Lee Bermejo, DC Comics, Aug. 2015)
