= Red Hood/Arsenal =

2015 comic book series

- Cover of the first issue.

Publication information
- Publisher: DC Comics
- Schedule: Monthly
- Format: Ongoing series
- Publication date: 2015-2016
- No. of issues: 13
- Main character(s): Red Hood; Arsenal

Creative team
- Created by: Scott Lobdell
- Written by: Scott Lobdell

Red Hood/Arsenal is a 2015 comic book series published by DC Comics featuring the characters Red Hood (Jason Todd) and Arsenal (Roy Harper). It was written by Scott Lobdell and illustrated by Dexter Soy and Denis Medri. The series was the second ongoing title for the character Jason Todd.

== Publication history ==
The series was a continuation of Lobdell's earlier series Red Hood and the Outlaws. Lobdell enjoyed working with artist Dexter Soy and he was brought on for the main series. The new series Red Hood/Arsenal focuses on the two characters being "heroes for hire" with new costumes. The series heavily featured the character Joker's Daughter. It partook in the "Robin War" storyline in 2016. The series was concluded that same year to coincide with DC Rebirth.

== Reception ==
The series holds an average rating of 5.9 by 63 professional critics on review aggregation website Comic Book Roundup.

== Collected editions ==
| Title | Material collected | Published date | ISBN |
|---|---|---|---|
| Red Hood / Arsenal Vol. 1: Open for Business | Red Hood / Arsenal #1-6 | April 2016 | 978-1401261542 |
| Red Hood / Arsenal Vol. 2: Dancing with the Devils Daughter | Red Hood / Arsenal #7-13 | October 2016 | 978-1401264895 |

== See also ==
- List of Batman comics
- List of DC Comics publications
