= Batman =

DC Comics superhero

- Cover of the DC Comics Absolute Edition of Batman: Hush (2011); Art by Jim Lee

Publication information
- Publisher: DC Comics
- First appearance: Detective Comics #27 (cover-dated May 1939; published March 30, 1939)
- Created by: Bob Kane; Bill Finger (Note: Finger was not credited in official materials until 2015.)

In-story information
- Alter ego: Bruce Wayne
- Place of origin: Gotham City
- Team affiliations: Justice League; Bat-Family; Outsiders; Wayne Enterprises
- Partnerships: Robin (various); Batgirl (various); Alfred Pennyworth; James Gordon; Superman; Wonder Woman; Catwoman
- Notable aliases: Dark Knight; Caped Crusader; Matches Malone; World's Greatest Detective
- Abilities: Genius-level intellect; Master detective; Master martial artist and hand-to-hand combatant; Master tactician, strategist and field commander; Proficient in using high-tech equipment and weapons

Batman (Note: Sometimes referred to as "the Batman" and originally stylized as The Bat-Man) is a superhero who appears in American comic books published by DC Comics. Batman was created by writer Bill Finger and artist Bob Kane, and debuted in the 27th issue of the comic book Detective Comics on March 30, 1939. In the DC Universe, Batman is the alias of Bruce Wayne, a wealthy American playboy, philanthropist, and industrialist who resides in the fictional Gotham City. Originally a millionaire, the character is later depicted as a billionaire. As Batman, he vows never to kill any criminal. His origin story features him swearing vengeance against criminals after witnessing the murder of his parents, Thomas and Martha, as a child, a vendetta tempered by the ideal of justice. Vowing never to use firearms and other lethal weaponry, he trains himself physically and intellectually, crafts a bat-inspired persona and arsenal, utilizes his family wealth and resources, and monitors the Gotham streets at night. He lives at his personal residence, Wayne Manor, which also houses his secret base, Batcave. Kane, Finger, and other creators accompanied Batman with supporting characters, including his sidekicks Robin and Batgirl; allies Alfred Pennyworth, James Gordon and Lucius Fox; love interest and occasional adversary Catwoman; as well as foes such as the Penguin, the Riddler, Two-Face, and his archenemy, the Joker.

Kane conceived Batman in early 1939 to capitalize on the popularity of Superman; although Kane frequently claimed sole creation credit, Finger substantially developed the concept from a generic superhero into something more bat-like. They drew inspiration from pulp fiction characters such as Sherlock Holmes and the Shadow. Batman received a spin-off publication, Batman, in 1940. Kane and Finger introduced Batman as a ruthless vigilante who frequently killed or maimed criminals, but he evolved into a just, tempered superhero with a stringent moral code that prohibits killing during the 1940s. Unlike most superheroes, Batman does not possess any superpowers, instead relying on his intellect, fighting skills, and wealth. The 1960s Batman television series used a camp aesthetic, which continued to be associated with Batman for years after it ended. Various creators worked to return Batman to his darker roots in the 1970s and 1980s, culminating with the 1986 miniseries The Dark Knight Returns by Frank Miller.

DC has featured Batman in many comic books, including comics published under its imprints such as Vertigo and Black Label; he has been considered DC's flagship character since the 1990s. The longest-running Batman comic, Detective Comics, is the longest-running comic book in the United States. Batman is frequently depicted alongside other DC superheroes, such as Superman and Wonder Woman, as a member of organizations such as the Justice League and the Outsiders. In addition to Bruce Wayne, other characters used the Batman persona, such as Jean-Paul Valley / Azrael in the 1993–1994 "Knightfall" story arc; Dick Grayson, the first Robin, from 2009 to 2011; and Jace Fox, the son of Wayne's ally Lucius, since 2021. DC has also published comics featuring alternate versions of Batman, including the incarnation seen in The Dark Knight Returns and its successors, the incarnation from the Flashpoint (2011) event, and numerous interpretations in comics published under the Elseworlds label.

Batman is one of the most iconic characters in popular culture and has been listed among the greatest comic book superheroes and characters ever created. He is one of the most commercially successful superheroes, the second best-selling comic book series in history with 460 million copies sold worldwide, and his likeness has been licensed and featured in various media and merchandise sold around the world; this includes toy lines such as Lego Batman and video games such as the Batman: Arkham series. Batman has been adapted in many live-action and animated television series and films. Adam West portrayed him in the 1960s Batman television series, and he has been portrayed in films by Michael Keaton, Val Kilmer, George Clooney, Christian Bale, Ben Affleck, and Robert Pattinson. Many actors, most prolifically Kevin Conroy, have provided Batman's voice in animation and video games. In September 2024, Batman was given a star on the Hollywood Walk of Fame, being the first superhero to receive the honor.

== Publication history ==
=== Creation and early history ===
In early 1939, following the success of Superman, DC Comics' editors requested more superheroes. Bob Kane created Batman, initially drawing a character with red tights, bat wings, and a domino mask. Bill Finger, a collaborator, made significant contributions by suggesting a cowl, cape, gloves, and a darker costume. The character's alter ego, Bruce Wayne, was inspired by historical figures Robert the Bruce and Mad Anthony Wayne. As an aristocratic hero with a double identity, Batman has predecessors in the Scarlet Pimpernel (created by Baroness Emmuska Orczy, 1903) and Zorro (created by Johnston McCulley, 1919). Like them, Batman performs his heroic deeds in secret, averts suspicion by playing aloof in public, and marks his work with a signature symbol. Kane noted the influence of the films The Mark of Zorro (1920) and The Bat Whispers (1930) in the creation of the character's iconography. Finger, drawing inspiration from pulp heroes such as Sherlock Holmes, The Shadow, Dick Tracy, and Doc Savage, made the character a master sleuth. Kane took credit for the creation of the character and diminished Finger's ideas, although Finger advocated for the significance of his contributions. In 2015, DC began to credit Finger as the co-creator of Batman, following years of legal action by Finger's family.

=== Golden Age ===
Batman debuted in Detective Comics #27 in 1939. The first Batman story is derivative of the story "Partners of Peril" published in the pulp magazine The Shadow #113, which was published several months earlier, written by Theodore Tinsley and illustrated by Tom Lovell. Batman eventually became the star of the title; the cover logo became "Detective Comics featuring Batman". Because of its significance, issue #27 is among the most valuable comic books in existence, with one copy selling for $1,075,000 in a February 2010 auction. Commissioner Gordon also appears in the first Batman story, indicating the significance of police perception of his vigilante activity.

Early stories were dark, featuring a Batman who did not shy away from killing. Batman's origin is first revealed in a two-page story in issue #33 (Nov. 1939). Written by Finger, it depicts a young Bruce Wayne witnessing his parents' murder at the hands of a mugger. Days later, at their grave, the child vows that "by the spirits of my parents [I will] avenge their deaths by spending the rest of my life warring on all criminals".

Batman became the main cover feature of the title beginning with issue #35 (Jan. 1940). The character's popularity led to his own solo title in Spring 1940. Robin, Batman's sidekick, was introduced in issue #38 (April 1940) of Detective Comics, lightening the tone. Sales nearly doubled, despite Kane's preference for a solo Batman, and it sparked a proliferation of "kid sidekicks". Batman #1 introduced iconic villains like the Joker and Catwoman (originally called "The Cat"). Following Batman #1, DC established an editorial edict that Batman could not kill his enemies or fire a gun.

Batman featured in both Detective Comics and Batman for decades to come. DC became the most popular comic book publisher, with Batman and the company's other major hero, Superman, as the cornerstones of the company's success. The two characters were featured side by side as the stars of World's Finest Comics (originally titled World's Best Comics), beginning in fall 1940.

Several more of Batman's best known villains debuted in the pages of Detective Comics during this era, including the Penguin in issue #58 (December 1941), Two-Face in issue #66, and the Riddler in issue #140. Scarecrow first appeared in a Batman story included in World's Finest Comics #3 (September 1941). Creators including Jerry Robinson and Dick Sprang worked as artists in the Batman comics during this period, sometimes considered assistants to Kane. In the post-war period, Batman was removed from the "bleak and menacing world" of the strips of the early 1940s, and instead portrayed as a respectable citizen and paternal figure that inhabited a "bright and colorful" environment.

=== Silver and Bronze Ages ===
The 1950s saw Batman in lighter, science fiction-influenced stories. Mr. Freeze was introduced to his rogue's gallery in this period. However, declining sales led to a 1964 revamp by editor Julius Schwartz, who returned Batman to his detective roots and updated his appearance. Barbara Gordon was a significant new supporting character at this time. The 1966 Batman TV series introduced a campy, humorous tone, which was reflected in the comics until its cancellation in 1968. Poison Ivy first appeared in Batman comics in that year.

In the 1970s, writers Dennis O'Neil and Neal Adams restored Batman's dark, gritty nature, a trend that continued despite fluctuating sales. The 1970s restored the characterization of the Joker as a homicidal psychopath. The period also introduced Ra's al Ghul, a centuries-old terrorist who knows Batman's secret identity, and his daughter, the seductive Talia al Ghul. In the 1980s, the original Robin, Dick Grayson, established independence from Batman and adopted the name Nightwing.

=== Modern Age ===
In the Modern Age of Comic Books Batman comics have undergone significant transformations, reflecting changing storytelling trends and audience interests. Beginning with seminal works like The Dark Knight Returns in the 1980s, which reintroduced Batman in a grittier, more mature context, the character's narrative evolved to explore deeper themes and darker tones. This period also saw the exploration of Batman's origins and psyche in Batman: Year One, Batman: The Killing Joke, and Arkham Asylum: A Serious House on Serious Earth. Batman collaborated with a second Robin, Jason Todd, who had a troubled past. In the story arc "A Death in the Family" (1988), Todd is murdered by the Joker.

In the 1990s, Batman teamed up with a new Robin, Tim Drake. "Knightfall" (1993–1994) introduced Bane, who physically and mentally challenged Batman, leading to a temporary replacement by Jean-Paul Valley. The aftermath of an earthquake in "No Man's Land" (1999) depicted Gotham City in chaos, pushing Batman to his limits. Entering the 21st century, Grant Morrison's run introduced Damian Wayne as Batman's son and heir. Morrison's storytelling also delved into surreal and existential themes, such as in Batman R.I.P. (2008) and Final Crisis (2008). The New 52 reboot in 2011 refreshed Batman's continuity while preserving core elements of his character. In Night of the Owls (2012), by Scott Snyder, Batman confronts the Court of Owls, a clandestine society that has been controlling Gotham for centuries. In 2024, Snyder wrote a new series featuring an alternate Batman, Absolute Batman, which was particularly successful commercially.

== Characterization ==
DC Comics concept art of Bruce Wayne by Mikel Janín

Batman's secret identity is Bruce Wayne, a wealthy American industrialist. As a child, Bruce witnessed the murder of his parents, Dr. Thomas Wayne and Martha Wayne, which ultimately led him to craft the Batman persona and seek justice against criminals. He resides on the outskirts of Gotham City in his personal residence, Wayne Manor. Wayne averts suspicion by acting the part of a superficial playboy idly living off his family's fortune and the profits of Wayne Enterprises, his inherited conglomerate. He supports philanthropic causes through his nonprofit Wayne Foundation, which in part addresses social issues encouraging crime as well as assisting victims of it, but is more widely known as a celebrity socialite. In public, he frequently appears in the company of high-status women, which encourages tabloid gossip. He feigns near-drunkenness by consuming large quantities of disguised ginger ale, though he is a teetotaler to maintain his physical and mental prowess. Although Bruce Wayne leads an active romantic life, his vigilante activities as Batman account for most of his time. While Bruce Wayne is never depicted as being especially religious, he is ethnically Jewish on his mother's side; his maternal cousin Batwoman (Kate Kane) is practicing. His father, Thomas, raised Bruce as a Christian, but as an adult he does not follow any religion.

Various modern stories have portrayed the extravagant, playboy image of Bruce Wayne as a facade. This is in contrast to the Post-Crisis Superman, whose Clark Kent persona is the true identity, while the Superman persona is the facade. In Batman Unmasked, a television documentary about the psychology of the character, behavioral scientist Benjamin Karney notes that Batman's personality is driven by Bruce Wayne's inherent humanity; that "Batman, for all its benefits and for all of the time Bruce Wayne devotes to it, is ultimately a tool for Bruce Wayne's efforts to make the world better". Bruce Wayne's principles include the desire to prevent future harm and a vow not to kill. Bruce Wayne believes that our actions define us, we fail for a reason, and anything is possible.

Writers of Batman and Superman stories have often compared and contrasted the two. Interpretations vary depending on the writer, the story, and the timing. Grant Morrison notes that both heroes "believe in the same kind of things" despite the day/night contrast their heroic roles display. Morrison notes an equally stark contrast in their real identities. Bruce Wayne and Clark Kent belong to different social classes: "Bruce has a butler, Clark has a boss." T. James Musler's book Unleashing the Superhero in Us All explores the extent to which Bruce Wayne's vast personal wealth is important in his life story, and the crucial role it plays in his efforts as Batman.

Will Brooker notes in his book Batman Unmasked that "the confirmation of the Batman's identity lies with the young audience ...he doesn't have to be Bruce Wayne; he just needs the suit and gadgets, the abilities, and most importantly the morality, the humanity. There's just a sense about him: 'they trust him ...and they're never wrong."

=== Personality ===
Batman's primary character traits can be summarized as "wealth; physical prowess; deductive abilities and obsession". The details and tone of Batman comic books have varied over the years with different creative teams. Dennis O'Neil noted that character consistency was not a major concern during early editorial regimes: "Julie Schwartz did a Batman in Batman and Detective and Murray Boltinoff did a Batman in the Brave and the Bold and apart from the costume they bore very little resemblance to each other. Julie and Murray did not want to coordinate their efforts, nor were they asked to do so. Continuity was not important in those days."

Batman on the variant cover of Detective Comics#1000 (May 2019). Art by Jason Fabok.

The driving force behind Bruce Wayne's character is his parents' murder and their absence. Bob Kane and Bill Finger discussed Batman's background and decided that "there's nothing more traumatic than having your parents murdered before your eyes". Despite his trauma, he sets his mind on studying to become a scientist and to train his body into physical perfection to fight crime in Gotham City as Batman, an inspired idea from Wayne's insight into the criminal mind. He also speaks over 40 languages.

Batman is often treated as a vigilante by other characters in his stories. Frank Miller views the character as "a dionysian figure, a force for anarchy that imposes an individual order". Dressed as a bat, Batman deliberately cultivates a frightening persona in order to aid him in crime-fighting, a fear that originates from the criminals' own guilty conscience. Miller is often credited with reintroducing anti-heroic traits into Batman's characterization, such as his brooding personality, willingness to use violence and torture, and increasingly alienated behavior. In 1940, Batman's characterization underwent a major shift shortly after the introduction of his young sidekick, Robin. DC editor Whitney Ellsworth felt that the character's violent, lethal methods would be a bad influence and taint his heroic image. Consequently, DC established a strict ethical code for its heroes, and Batman was subsequently retconned to possess a stringent moral code prohibiting him from killing. Miller's Batman was closer to the original pre-Robin version, who was willing to kill criminals if necessary. Some contemporary authors have presented Batman as obsessive, neurotic, or even nearly psychopathic; in contrast, Grant Morrison argues that the character can be more consistently understood as basically well-adjusted and mentally healthy.

=== Fictional character biography ===
Batman's history has undergone many retroactive continuity revisions, both minor and major. Elements of the character's history have varied greatly. Scholars William Uricchio and Roberta E. Pearson noted in the early 1990s, "Unlike some fictional characters, the Batman has no primary urtext set in a specific period, but has rather existed in a plethora of equally valid texts constantly appearing over more than five decades." Later editors, beginning with Dennis O'Neil, have attempted to ensure consistency and continuity between stories. The following is a standard biography of the current mainstream version of Batman; the order of events vary in different stories and eras.

Thomas and Martha Wayne are shot by Joe Chill in Detective Comics #33 (November 1939), art by Bob Kane

Orphaned at a young age after witnessing the murder of his parents—the prominent Gotham City physician Dr. Thomas Wayne and his wife, Martha—Bruce Wayne was driven by the trauma to dedicate his life to a one-man war on crime as the vigilante Batman. The gunman, named Joe Chill, escapes. Wayne is raised by Alfred Pennyworth. This event drives Wayne to train his body to its peak condition, and eventually to fight crime as Batman. Pearson and Uricchio note that the origin story is one of the few fixed aspects of Batman's biography, constant in all of the different versions.

Bruce Wayne is brought up in Wayne Manor, and leads a happy and privileged existence until the age of 8, when his parents are killed by a small-time criminal while on their way home from a movie theater. That night, Bruce Wayne swears an oath to spend his life fighting crime. He engages in intense intellectual and physical training; however, he realizes that these skills alone would not be enough. When a bat flies through his window, Bruce decides to create the Batman persona so that criminals will fear him.

Wayne takes in an orphaned circus acrobat, Dick Grayson, who becomes his vigilante partner, Robin. Alfred Pennyworth arrives at Wayne Manor, and after deducing the Dynamic Duo's secret identities, joins their service as their butler. Batman forms the Justice League, along with Superman and Wonder Woman. Grayson grows up and attends college. After Grayson's maturation, Batman usually works solo in Gotham City, with occasional team-ups with Robin or Batgirl. Grayson eventually adopts a new identity, Nightwing. Batman encounters Ra's al Ghul and his daughter, Talia al Ghul.

Batman attempts to train a new Robin, Jason Todd, but he is killed by the Joker. Subsequently, Batman begins exhibiting an excessive, reckless approach to his crimefighting. He eventually adopts a new Robin, Tim Drake.

A new enemy, Bane breaks Batman's spine, paralyzing him. Bruce Wayne then asks Jean-Paul Valley to take on the identity. Valley becomes increasingly violent, while Wayne recuperates; eventually Wayne defeats Valley. Wayne hands the Batman mantle to Dick Grayson for an interim period before permanently returning the Batman identity.

Bruce officially adopts Tim Drake, an orphan, as his son. Subsequently, Batman meets Damian Wayne, his son with Talia al Ghul.

Batman is apparently killed by Darkseid. Dick Grayson becomes Batman and Damian Wayne becomes Robin. Bruce Wayne has in fact been sent backwards through time, and to return to the present he journeys through various historical eras. Upon returning to the present, Wayne franchises the Batman identity across the globe; Wayne Enterprises publicly funds "Batman, Incorporated", an international Batman organization. Dick Grayson returns to the Nightwing identity, with Wayne serving as the sole Batman once again. Batman faces the Court of Owls, a secret organization that has been operating in Gotham City for decades. Both Joker and Batman apparently die in battle with each other. Bruce Wayne returns, with amnesia. Jim Gordon temporarily becomes Batman, using a high-tech suit. Wayne, regains his memories.

Batman proposes to Catwoman and she accepts, but she leaves him at the altar. Bane kills Alfred Pennyworth.

== Supporting characters ==
Batman's interactions with both villains and cohorts have, over time, developed a strong supporting cast of characters.

=== Enemies ===
Batman faces a variety of foes ranging from common criminals to outlandish, though often likewise superpower-less supervillains. Many of them mirror aspects of the Batman's character and development, often having tragic origin stories that lead them to a life of crime. These foes are commonly referred to as Batman's rogues gallery. Batman's "most implacable foe" is the Joker, a homicidal maniac with a clown-like appearance. The Joker is considered by critics to be his perfect adversary, since he is the antithesis of Batman in personality and appearance; the Joker has a maniacal demeanor with a colorful appearance, while Batman has a serious and resolute demeanor with a dark appearance. As a "personification of the irrational", the Joker represents "everything Batman [opposes]". Like Batman, the Joker character has a strong capability for characterization of varying verisimilitude; he is an equally successful character when depicted as a literal, mostly irksome clown, a traditional gangster, or a philosophically motivated antagonist with no moral reservations. Other long-time recurring foes that are part of Batman's rogues gallery include Catwoman (a cat burglar anti-heroine who is variously an ally and romantic interest), Two-Face (Harvey Dent), the Penguin, the Riddler, Ra's al Ghul, the Scarecrow, Mr. Freeze, Poison Ivy, Harley Quinn, Bane, Clayface, and Killer Croc, among others. Many of Batman's adversaries are often psychiatric patients at Arkham Asylum.

=== Allies ===
Alfred Pennyworth, Batman's loyal butler and father figure, first appeared in Batman #16 (1943). After Bruce Wayne's parents were killed, Alfred raised Bruce and became one of the few people to know his secret identity. He is often portrayed as a steadying presence in Bruce's life, offering both emotional support and practical assistance in Batman's crime-fighting endeavors. More than just a caretaker, Alfred is a trusted ally and sometimes sidekick, sharing Wayne Manor with Bruce and contributing to Batman's mission.

One of Batman's most crucial allies is Commissioner James Gordon. Their relationship is built on mutual respect and a shared commitment to justice in Gotham City. In Batman: Year One, Gordon and Batman learn to trust each other, which transforms their efforts against crime into a more effective partnership. Gordon's perspective as a police officer complements Batman's vigilantism, allowing them to tackle Gotham's challenges together. Another important ally is the Justice League, which further emphasizes the importance of collaboration. Batman's relationship with Superman showcases how their contrasting ideologies can complement each other. In stories like World's Finest, their friendship highlights how Batman's methods benefit from Superman's optimism and strength.

=== Sidekicks ===
Batman and Robin, art by Jack Burnley

Robin, Batman's vigilante partner, has been a widely recognized supporting character for many years; each iteration of the Robin character, of which there have been five in the mainstream continuity, functions as a member of the Batman family and as Batman's "central" sidekick in various media. Bill Finger stated that he wanted to include Robin because "Batman didn't have anyone to talk to, and it got a little tiresome always having him thinking." The first Robin, Dick Grayson, was introduced in 1940. In the 1970s, he finally grew up, went off to college, and became the hero Nightwing. A second Robin, Jason Todd was introduced in the 1980s, following Dick Grayson's departure from the role. Initially impulsive and rebellious, Jason's tenure as Robin was controversial among fans. In 1988, DC held a fan vote to determine his fate in the iconic A Death in the Family storyline, where the Joker brutally beat Jason with a crowbar and left him to die in an explosion. The fans voted for his death. However, Jason was later resurrected and returned as the antihero Red Hood.

The third Robin in the mainstream comics is Tim Drake, who first appeared in 1989. He went on to star in his own comic series, and goes by the name Red Robin, a variation on the traditional Robin persona. In the first decade of the new millennium, Stephanie Brown served as the fourth in-universe Robin between stints as her self-made vigilante identity the Spoiler, and later as Batgirl. After Brown's apparent death, Drake resumed the role of Robin for a time. The role eventually passed to Damian Wayne, the 10-year-old son of Bruce Wayne and Talia al Ghul, in the late 2000s. Damian's tenure as Robin temporarily ended when the character was killed off in the pages of Batman Incorporated in 2013. He was brought back to life and returned to the role the next year.

Batman's next young sidekick is Harper Row, a streetwise young woman who avoids the name Robin but followed the ornithological theme nonetheless; she debuted the codename and identity of the Bluebird in 2014. Unlike the Robins, the Bluebird is willing and permitted to use a gun, albeit non-lethal; her weapon of choice is a modified rifle that fires taser rounds. In 2015, a new series began titled We Are...Robin, focused on a group of teenagers using the Robin persona to fight crime in Gotham City. The most prominent of these, Duke Thomas, later becomes Batman's crimefighting partner as The Signal.

=== Romantic interests ===
Batman's two most significant romantic partners are both morally ambiguous femme fatales: Catwoman and Talia al Ghul. Catwoman/Selina Kyle first appeared in Batman #1 (1940). She was created in the pre–Comics Code era and portrayed as a "flirtatious and sensual" character to add a layer of sex appeal to Batman. Catwoman is Batman's most frequently represented romantic partner, although their relationship is often ambivalent. The two were engaged, but the marriage was called off.

Talia al Ghul, introduced in Detective Comics #411 (1971) as the daughter of Batman's enemy Ra's al Ghul. Their love story resulted in the birth of Damian Wayne, who would later become Robin. She recurs throughout Batman stories as an ambiguous femme fatale.

Batman's first love interest was Julie Madison, an actress introduced in Detective Comics #31 (1939); they were engaged, but she left him due to his playboy persona. Following The New 52 DC relaunch, the character was reintroduced as an artist whose father was a gunrunner involved in the death of Bruce's parents.

Another love interest is intrepid reporter Vicki Vale, who debuted in Batman #49 (1948), and was inspired by Superman's girlfriend, reporter Lois Lane. Vicki frequently tried to prove that Bruce Wayne was Batman, but never succeeded.

Kathy Kane/Batwoman debuted in Detective Comics #233 (1956); she was introduced as a love interest for Batman following allegations of homosexuality between Batman and Robin. The character was written out in the 1960s and returned in the 1970s to be killed by the League of Assassins. Writer Grant Morrison later brought Kathy back into DC's continuity in Batman, Inc., as part of his attempts to canonize every Batman story, but she was killed off again.

Silver St. Cloud was introduced in 1977; she was a socialite who learned Batman's identity and could not come to terms with his dangerous lifestyle.

Natalia Knight/Nocturna, debuted in Detective Comics #529 (1983) as the leader of a criminal organization. She became Batman's love interest and later the adopted mother of Jason Todd. Nocturna was later killed by her former lover, Night-Slayer, but returned in subsequent continuity.

=== Other characters who take on the identity of Batman ===
On several occasions, former Robin Dick Grayson has served as Batman; most notably in 2009 while Wayne was believed dead, and served as a second Batman even after Wayne returned in 2010. As part of DC's 2011 continuity relaunch, Grayson returned to being Nightwing following the Flashpoint crossover event.

In an interview with IGN, Morrison detailed that having Dick Grayson as Batman and Damian Wayne as Robin represented a "reverse" of the normal dynamic between Batman and Robin, with, "a more light-hearted and spontaneous Batman and a scowling, badass Robin". Morrison explained their intentions for the new characterization of Batman: "Dick Grayson is kind of this consummate superhero. The guy has been Batman's partner since he was a kid, he's led the Teen Titans, and he's trained with everybody in the DC Universe. So he's a very different kind of Batman. He's a lot easier; He's a lot looser and more relaxed."

Over the years, there have been numerous others to assume the name of Batman, or to officially take over for Bruce during his leaves of absence. Jean-Paul Valley, also known as Azrael, assumed the cowl after the events of the Knightfall saga. Jim Gordon donned a mecha-suit after the events of Batman: Endgame, and served as Batman in 2015 and 2016. In 2021, as part of the Fear State crossover event, Lucius Fox's son Jace Fox succeeds Bruce as Batman in a 2021 storyline, depicted in the series I Am Batman, after Batman was declared dead.

Additionally, members of the group Batman Incorporated, Bruce Wayne's experiment at franchising his brand of vigilantism, have at times stood in as the official Batman in cities around the world.

== Abilities ==
=== Skills and training ===
Batman has no inherent superhuman powers; he relies on "his own scientific knowledge, detective skills, and athletic prowess". Batman's inexhaustible wealth gives him access to advanced technologies, and as a proficient scientist, he is able to use and modify these technologies to his advantage. In the stories, Batman is regarded as one of the world's greatest detectives, if not the world's greatest crime solver. Batman has been repeatedly described as having a genius-level intellect, being one of the greatest martial artists in the DC Universe, and having peak human physical and mental conditioning. As a polymath, his knowledge and expertise in countless disciplines is nearly unparalleled by any other character in the DC Universe. He has shown prowess in assorted fields such as mathematics, biology, physics, chemistry, and several levels of engineering. He has traveled the world acquiring the skills needed to aid him in his endeavors as Batman. In the Superman: Doomed story arc, Superman considers Batman to be one of the most brilliant minds on the planet.

Batman has trained extensively in various fighting styles, making him one of the best hand-to-hand fighters in the DC Universe. He possesses a photographic memory, and has fully utilized his photographic memory to master a total of 127 forms of martial arts. The DC Book of Lists records various instances of training taking place in the comic book stories, including practice of kung fu, boxing, karate, ninjutsu, savate, judo and jujutsu. In terms of his physical condition, Batman is described as peak human and far beyond an Olympic-athlete-level condition, able to perform feats such as easily running across rooftops in a Parkour-esque fashion and pressing thousands of pounds regularly.

Batman is strongly disciplined, and he has the ability to function under great physical pain and resist most forms of telepathy and mind control. He is a master of disguise, multilingual, and an expert in espionage, often gathering information under the identity of a notorious gangster named Matches Malone. Batman is highly skilled in stealth movement and escapology, which allows him to appear and disappear at will and to break free of nearly inescapable deathtraps with little to no harm. He is also a master strategist, with numerous plans in preparation for almost any eventuality. Batman is an expert in interrogation techniques and his intimidating and frightening appearance alone is often all that is needed in getting information from suspects.

=== Technology ===
Batman utilizes a vast arsenal of specialized, high-tech vehicles and gadgets in his war against crime, the designs of which usually share a bat motif. Batman historian Les Daniels credits Gardner Fox with creating the concept of Batman's arsenal with the introduction of the utility belt in Detective Comics #29 (July 1939) and the first bat-themed weapons the batarang and the "Batgyro" in Detective Comics #31 and 32 (Sept. and October 1939).

Batman's batsuit aids in his combat against enemies, having the properties of both Kevlar and Nomex. It protects him from gunfire and other significant impacts, and incorporates the imagery of a bat in order to frighten criminals.

The details of the Batman costume change repeatedly through various decades, stories, media and artists' interpretations, but the most distinctive elements remain consistent: a scallop-hem cape; a cowl covering most of the face; a pair of bat-like ears; a stylized bat emblem on the chest; and the ever-present utility belt. His gloves typically feature three scallops that protrude from long, gauntlet-like cuffs, although in his earliest appearances he wore short, plain gloves without the scallops. The overall look of the character, particularly the length of the cowl's ears and of the cape, varies greatly depending on the artist. Dennis O'Neil said, "We now say that Batman has two hundred suits hanging in the Batcave so they don't have to look the same ...Everybody loves to draw Batman, and everybody wants to put their own spin on it."

Finger and Kane originally conceptualized Batman as having a black cape and cowl and grey suit, but conventions in coloring called for black to be highlighted with blue. Hence, the costume's colors have appeared in the comics as dark blue and grey; as well as black and grey.

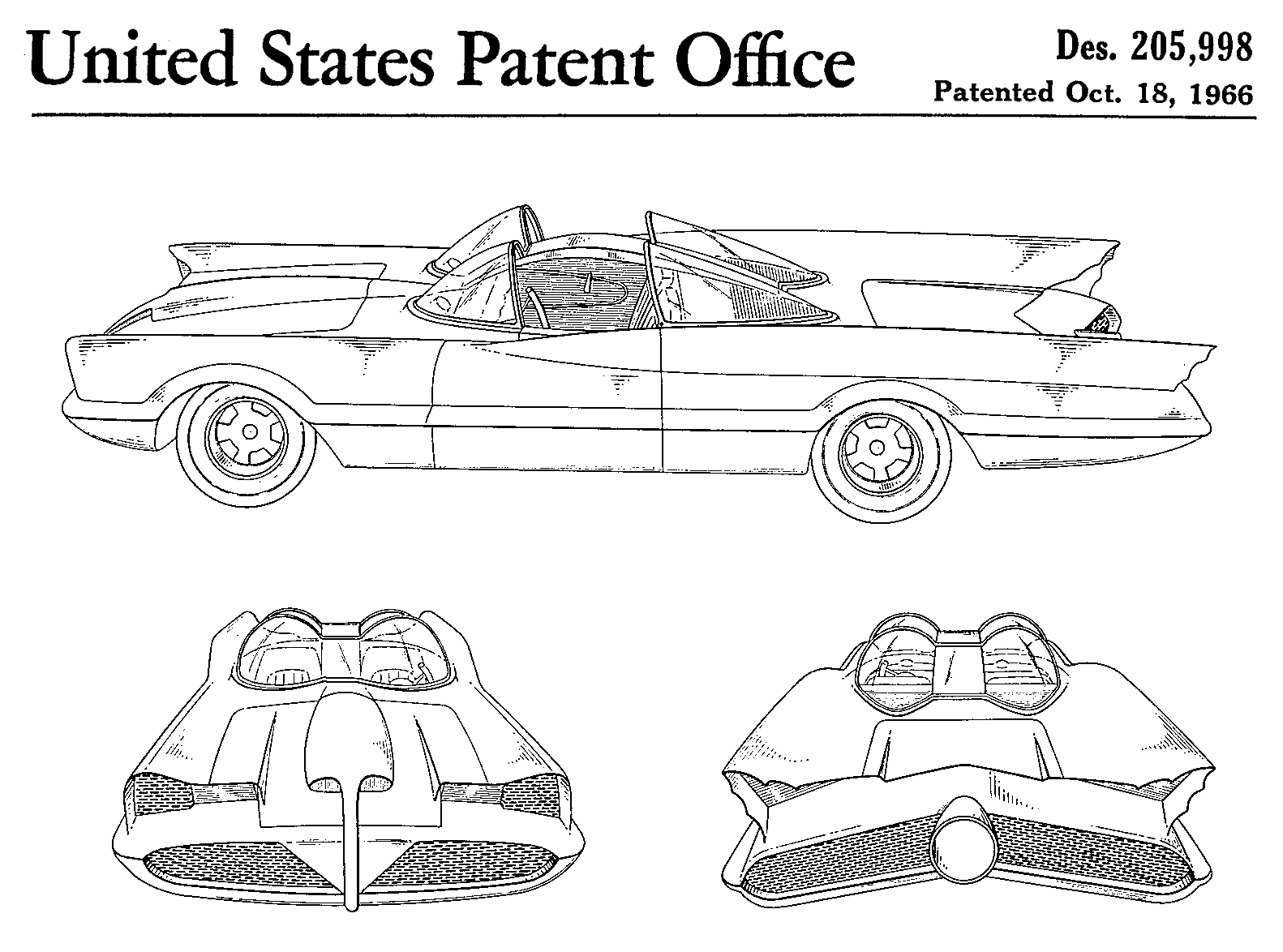
The 1966 television Batmobile, built by George Barris from a Lincoln Futura concept car

Batman's primary vehicle is the Batmobile, which is usually depicted as an imposing black car, often with tailfins that suggest a bat's wings. Batman also has an aircraft called the Batplane.

Batman keeps most of his field equipment in his utility belt. Over the years it has shown to contain an assortment of crime-fighting tools, weapons, and investigative and technological instruments. Different versions of the belt have these items stored in compartments, often as pouches or hard cylinders attached evenly around it.

When Batman is needed, the Gotham City police activate a searchlight with a bat-shaped insignia over the lens called the Bat-Signal, which shines into the night sky, creating a bat-symbol on a passing cloud which can be seen from any point in Gotham. The origin of the signal varies, depending on the continuity and medium.

The Batcave is Batman's secret headquarters, consisting of a series of caves beneath his mansion, Wayne Manor. As his command center, the Batcave serves multiple purposes; supercomputer, surveillance, redundant power-generators, forensics lab, medical infirmary, private study, training dojo, fabrication workshop, arsenal, hangar and garage. It houses the vehicles and equipment Batman uses in his campaign to fight crime. It is also a trophy room and storage facility for Batman's unique memorabilia collected over the years from various cases he has worked on.

== Reception ==
Batman has ascended to the status of a global pop culture phenomenon, transcending his origins in comic books. His influence expanded notably with the release of the 1989 film, which propelled him to the forefront of public consciousness through widespread merchandising. The Guardian describes Batman as emblematic of the constant reinvention characteristic of modern mass culture, embodying both iconic status and commercial appeal, making him a quintessential cultural artifact of the 21st century.

=== Media appearances ===
Apart from comics, Batman's presence spans various mediums, including newspapers, radio dramas, television, stage, and film. From the 1940s serials to contemporary TV shows like Gotham and Titans, Batman's legacy endures. Celebrating the character's 75th anniversary, Warner Bros released Batman: Strange Days, showcasing his timeless appeal.

In September 2024, Batman became the first superhero to be given a star on the Hollywood Walk of Fame. It was the 2,790th star. Different adaptations have been criticized by fans for the extreme changes in tone and style between different iterations of the character in the franchise.

=== Different interpretations ===
Gay interpretations of Batman have been studied academically since psychologist Fredric Wertham's claims in 1954. Andy Medhurst and Will Brooker have explored Batman's appeal to gay audiences and the validity of a queer reading. Meanwhile, in psychological interpretations, Dr. Travis Langley sees Batman as representing the "shadow archetype", confronting inner darkness to fight evil, according to Carl Jung and Joseph Campbell's theories. Langley's analysis adds depth to Batman's psychological complexity.

== Bibliography ==
- Beatty, Scott (2005). The Batman Handbook: The Ultimate Training Manual. Quirk Books. ISBN 978-1-59474-023-7.
- Boichel, Bill (1991). "Batman: Commodity as Myth". The Many Lives of the Batman: Critical Approaches to a Superhero and His Media. London: Routledge. ISBN 978-0-85170-276-6.
- Daniels, Les (1999). Batman: The Complete History. Chronicle Books. ISBN 978-0-8118-2470-5.
- Daniels, Les (1995). DC Comics: Sixty Years of the World's Favorite Comic Book Heroes. Bulfinch. ISBN 978-0-8212-2076-4.
- Daniels, Les (2003). DC Comics: A Celebration of the World's Favorite Comic Book Heroes. Billboard Books/Watson-Guptill Publications. ISBN 978-0-8230-7919-3.
- Daniels, Les (April 2004). Batman: The Complete History: The Life and Times of the Dark Knight. Chronicle Books. ISBN 978-0-8118-4232-7.
- Desris, Joe (1994). "Cops, Crooks, and Creeps". The Golden Age of Batman The Greatest Covers of Detective Comics From the '30s to the '50s. New York, New York: Artabras. ISBN 0896600467.
- Manning, Matthew K.; Wallace, Daniel (2022). Batman: The Ultimate Guide. DK. ISBN 978-0-7440-4821-6.
- Pearson, Roberta E.; Uricchio, William, eds. (1991). The Many Lives of the Batman: Critical Approaches to a Superhero and His Media. London: Routledge. ISBN 978-0-85170-276-6.
- Steranko, Jim (1970). The Steranko History of Comics 1. Supergraphics. ISBN 978-0-517-50188-7.)
- Wallace, Daniel; Dolan, Hannah (2010). "1930s". DC Comics Year By Year A Visual Chronicle. London, United Kingdom: Dorling Kindersley. ISBN 978-0-7566-6742-9.
- Wright, Bradford W. (2001). Comic Book Nation: The Transformation of Youth Culture in America. The Johns Hopkins University Press. ISBN 978-0-8018-6514-5.
