= Court of Owls =

Organization in Batman and other DC Comics

- The Court of Owls surrounds Batman. Art by Greg Capullo.

Publication information
- Publisher: DC Comics
- First appearance: Batman (vol. 2) #6 (February 2012)
- Created by: Scott Snyder (writer); Greg Capullo (artist)

In-story information
- Type of organization: Organized crime Secret society
- Base(s): Gotham City, later international
- Agent(s): The Talons

Roster

The Court of Owls is a criminal organization and secret society appearing in American comic books published by DC Comics. They appear as adversaries of the superhero Batman. Created by writer Scott Snyder and artist Greg Capullo, the Court is described as an organization of the wealthiest and most influential citizens of Gotham City, having existed since the city's founding and completely unknown among its general population outside of an urban legend centered around their reputation for grisly assassinations carried out by indoctrinated agents known as Talons. The 2015–2016 "Robin War" story line details their international expansion, with the group renaming itself as the Parliament of Owls.

The Court of Owls made their on-screen debut in 2015's Batman vs. Robin as part of the DC Animated Movie Universe before making their live-action debut later that same year in the Gotham television series. They feature prominently in the story of the 2022 video game Gotham Knights, and appear as main antagonists in the unrelated 2023 television series of the same name.

== Publication history ==
The Court of Owls was created by writer Scott Snyder and artist Greg Capullo and feature as Batman's main antagonists in the first two-story arcs of The New 52, the 2011 reboot of DC's continuity. They are first mentioned in Batman (vol. 2) #2 (2011) and make their first cameo appearance in Batman (vol. 2) #3 when Batman discovers one of their secret bases of operation and where they are seen posing with one of their assassins, the Talon William Cobb, in a series of old photographs, finally providing Batman with proof of their existence. The Court of Owls make their first full appearance in Batman (vol. 2) #6 with Batman fighting his way through the Labyrinth.

== Fictional team history ==
=== The New 52 ===
The Court of Owls is a violent cabal of some of Gotham City's oldest and wealthiest families who use murder and money to wield political influence throughout history. To carry out their interests, they employ a breed of highly trained assassins known as Talons. The leaders of the organization appear to be human and wear white owl masks on their faces. The earliest history of the Court of Owls dates back to Gotham's earliest days in the 1600s.

Bruce Wayne recounts that, as a child, he believed the Court of Owls responsible for the death of his parents and personally investigated the conspiracy before determining that there was no evidence. When Wayne announces plans to rebuild and reshape Gotham City for the future, the Court sentences him to death and their assassin, the Talon William Cobb, attempts to murder him during a meeting with Lincoln March. They struggle at the top of Wayne Tower and the killer survives a fall from the top. Batman discovers that their society has various secret headquarters throughout hidden rooms in every building established by the Alan Wayne Trust, created by Bruce's great-grandfather Alan Wayne.

In the 2012 storyline Night of the Owls, the Court of Owls, angered at William Cobb's defeat at the hands of Batman, awaken all of their other Talons to reclaim Gotham City from Batman. The Court's goal is to prove that they, not Batman, are the superior legend of Gotham City. The Bat Family and Birds of Prey work together to defeat them.

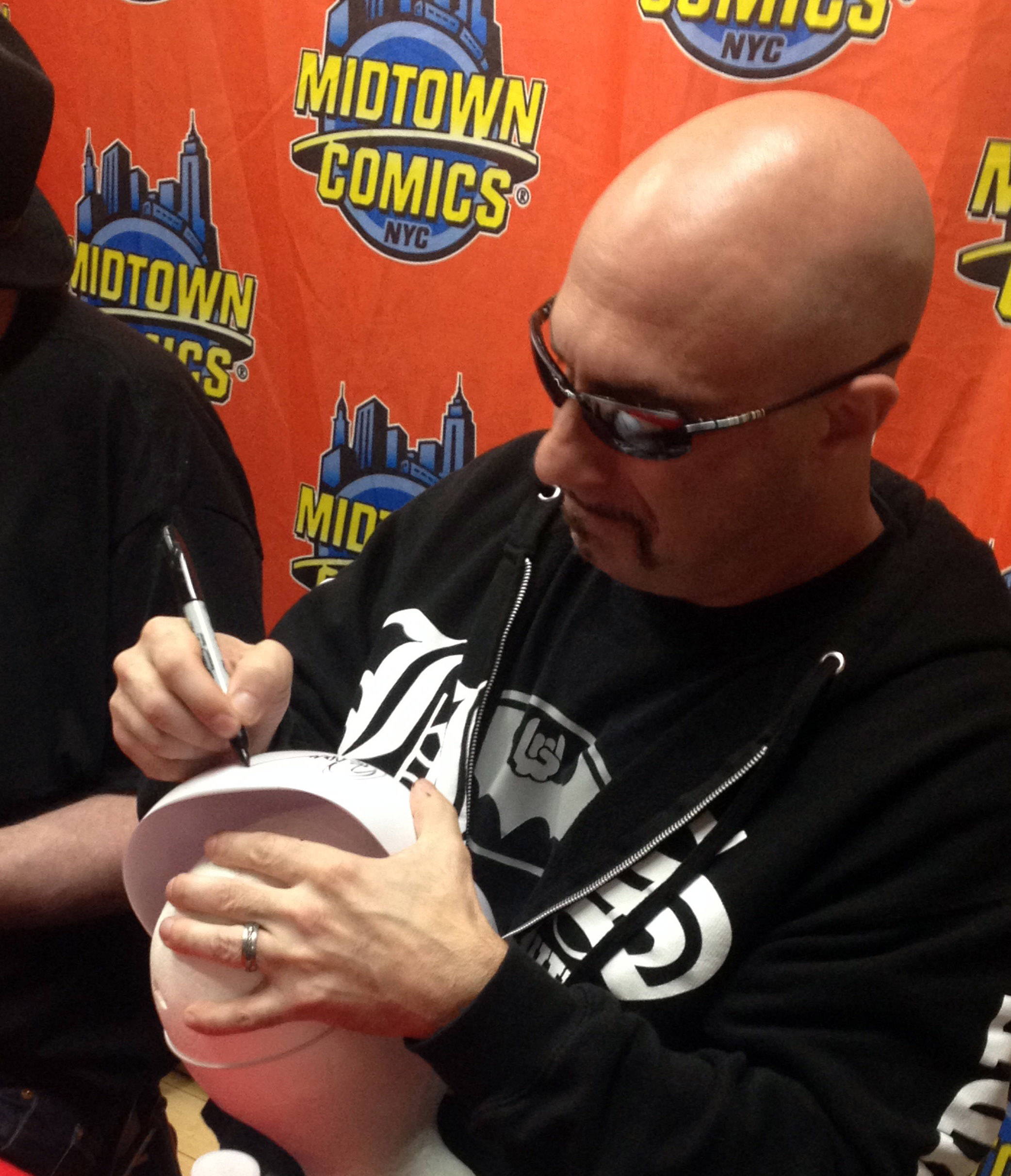
Artist Greg Capullo signing a Court of Owls replica mask during an appearance at Midtown Comics.

During the Forever Evil storyline, the Court of Owls see the news from the Crime Syndicate that the Justice League is "dead" and claims that the Court of Owls will prosper. With their existence threatened, they dig into the foundations of their arcane history and use it to adapt. A prominent member of the Court of Owls shows his daughter where the Court of Owls began: the chamber of the First Talon.

At the conclusion of the 2014–2015 series Batman Eternal, it is revealed that Lincoln March used the Court's resources to fund Cluemaster's campaign against Batman, reasoning that Batman's public death at the hands of an unknown enemy would forever end the "myth" of the Dark Knight. However, the plan fails when Batman's allies and the people of Gotham City rally together against March's assault after Commissioner Gordon calls on them to stand up for the city in Batman's name, forcing March to retreat.

In the 2015-2016 storyline Robin War, the Court of Owls reanimate Lincoln March, who has devised a way to obtain their prophesied Gray Son. Councilwoman Noctua, a member of the Court, rises to power in Gotham City and implants laws that ban all Robin paraphernalia and will imprison those caught possessing or wearing anything Robin-related. This gets the attention of the four Robins: Dick Grayson, Jason Todd, Tim Drake, and Damian Wayne, who all arrive in Gotham to train the hundreds of members of the Robins street gang.

=== DC Rebirth ===
In Nightwing (vol. 4), Lincoln March addresses the Parliament of Owls as they decide to cast aside their connection to the Court of Owls in Gotham and don black owl masks. As March begins to preach his new role in the Parliament, he is killed by the Raptor, who reveals that both he and the Parliament agree that March's own desires began to become a hindrance to them and they needed a clean path to Nightwing. Dick Grayson has finally re-obtained his secret identity and has returned to the role of Nightwing. He willingly works for the Parliament to bring them down from the inside; they are wary of and suspect Grayson's true intentions, but they do not know that their leverage over him has been resolved. To keep him in check, the Parliament partners him with the Raptor to aid in his missions.

In the 2017 storyline Dark Nights: Metal, it is revealed that the Court of Owls were predominately a cult that worshiped Barbatos, a dark god associated with bats who hailed from the Dark Multiverse beneath the DC Multiverse. A cell of members ambush the Justice League and offer Batman as the key to open up the Dark Multiverse, but are killed by The Batman Who Laughs and his Robins.

Dick Grayson is shot in the head by KGBeast, causing him to sustain amnesia and assume the name Ric. His amnesia was in part caused by the Court of Owls in an attempt to finally get Dick to join them. Dick's memories are altered and he relives his darkest days as his friends and allies work to free him.

== Members ==
- R.H. Orchard – Built the Orchard Hotel in 1893. His son Benjamin Orchard ran away from home and joined Haly's Circus. R. H. turned his own son into a Talon as a reprisal for turning his back on his legacy.
- Maria Powers – The wife of Joseph Powers and owner of the Powers Hotel.
- Lincoln March – A Gotham City mayoral candidate and COO of March Venture who claims to be Thomas Wayne Jr.
- Thurston Moody – A wealthy Gotham nobleman who is a potential member in the 1800s. He used kidnapped children as slaves beneath Gotham City, which was uncovered by Jonah Hex and Amadeus Arkham.
- Sebastian Clark – The former Grandmaster of the Court. Clark escaped the Court when it came for his father and lived in Europe for years under an assumed identity before returning to Gotham City and assuming the title of Grandmaster.
- John Wycliffe – The Grandmaster of the Court after Sebastian Clark. He is a descendant of Bartholomew Wycliffe, one of the signers of Gotham's original charter. Wycliffe was killed by Sebastian Clark.
- Moloch - Orator is a member of the Court of Owls.
- Doctor Leviticus - An inventor and member of the Court of Owls who was responsible for discovering the Electrum used for the Court of Owls' resurrection of Talons.
- Judge of Owls - A high-ranking member of the Court of Owls.
- Cressida Clarke - The granddaughter of Sebastian Clark and an associate of the Court of Owls.

=== Talons ===
The Talons are a group of highly trained assassins loyal to the Court of Owls. Among the known Talons are:

- Uriah Boone – Uriah Boone was one of the oldest Talons, active at some point before Gotham was industrialized.
- Ephraim Newhouse – Ephraim Newhouse was the Talon of 1665. During the Night of the Owls storyline, Newhouse is revived and sent by the Court to assassinate Oswald Cobblepot.
- Henry Ballard – Henry Ballard is the Talon of 1847. He remembers the Gotham City of his time as a violent place and sees the city's present the same way.
- Talon of the 1780s - An unnamed Talon from the 1780s who was later beheaded by Damian Wayne.
- Alexander Staunton – Alexander Staunton was the Talon of 1856.
- Felix Harmon – Felix Harmon, known as the "Gotham Butcher," was the Talon of the 1860s.
- Xiao Loong – Xiao Loong was the Talon of the 1890s.
- The O'Malleys – Three generations of O'Malleys have served as Talons: James O'Malley, his son Brandon, and his grandson Nathaniel.
- Jonas – Jonas was the Talon of the 1920s. He was from a poor African-American farming family in Georgia.
- Benjamin Orchard – A Talon in the 1930s for one year.
- Mary Turner – Mary is the Talon of the 1940s. She was horribly disfigured at a young age by a bomb attached to a balloon which was sent by Emperor Hirohito to cause panic in the United States during World War II. Mary later joins the Birds of Prey and takes on the codename "Strix" (Latin for "owl").
- Alton Carver – Alton Carver was the most recent Talon. He was given mayoral candidate Lincoln March as a target.
- Calvin Rose – At age 8, Calvin Rose was locked in a dog kennel by his father for three days. After freeing himself, Rose escaped to Haly's Circus, where he was trained as an escape artist. Rose was later recruited by the Court of Owls and trained to be their next Talon.
- William Cobb – One of the Court's most prolific members, Cobb is the assassin sent to murder Bruce Wayne prior to the Night of the Owls. Born on October 10, 1901, Cobb was the son of an ironworker and textile worker who lost his life while working on a bridge. He is also the great-grandfather of Dick Grayson, and is later a member of the Suicide Squad.
- James Gordon Jr. – The son of James Gordon who was revived as a Talon.

== Other versions ==
An alternate universe iteration of the Court of Owls appears in Absolute Batman, with Martha Wayne as a prominent former member. This version of the group is a paramilitary organization.

== In other media ==
=== Television ===
- The Court of Owls appears in Gotham, with known members including Kathryn Monroe (portrayed by Kit Flanagan in the second season, Leslie Hendrix in the third season); Jim Gordon's uncle Frank Gordon (portrayed by James Remar); the Talons (portrayed by Brandon Alan Smith), who all dress in business suits and domino masks; and several unidentified people in owl masks secretly led by Sensei (portrayed by Raymond J. Barry). Additionally, Jim also briefly joins the Court to discover their plan to destroy Gotham. In the episode "Pretty Hate Machine", the Court's members are killed by the Talons working for Sensei because they condoned Hugo Strange's unauthorized murder of Thomas and Martha Wayne.
- The Court of Owls appears in the Harley Quinn episode "A Thief, A Mole, An Orgy", led by the unidentified High Owl (voiced by Andy Daly) and with Bruce Wayne, Catwoman, Bane, Killer Croc, and KGBeast, among other prominent figures and supervillains, as known associates. This version of the group is an orgy-based secret society.
- The Court of Owls appears in Gotham Knights (2023), led by Rebecca March and consisting of Lincoln March and Cressida Clarke. Additionally, Alan Wayne appears as a former member who betrayed the court, Doctor Leviticus as a past member, and Felix Harmon as a known Talon. This version of the group is connected to Mayor Hamilton Hill and Gotham's unnamed governor. Throughout the series, they murder Bruce Wayne, frame his adoptive son Turner Hayes for it, and blackmail Detective Sophia Green to retrieve portraits that Alan possessed and contain a map to an element called "Electrum" so they can use it to "live forever". Additionally, Rebecca's real name is revealed to be Dr. Rebekah Leviticus, who has lived for years and was previously engaged to Alan. Upon obtaining and refining the Electrum, she poisons Lincoln and orders the Talons to kill the other Court members.

=== Film ===
- The Court of Owls appears in Batman vs. Robin, consisting of the Grandmaster (voiced by Robin Atkin Downes), socialite Samantha Vanaver (voiced by Grey DeLisle), and an unidentified Talon (voiced by Jeremy Sisto) who is the son of an abusive jewel thief. Throughout the film, Talon attempts to help Robin realize his potential and join the Court. However, Talon betrays them after refusing to kill a kidnapped Robin and seizes control of the Court's army of zombified Talons. After his army is destroyed by Batman, Nightwing, and Alfred Pennyworth and he is defeated by Robin, Talon commits suicide.
- The Court of Owls will appear in The Batman: Part II.

=== Video games ===
- William Cobb / Talon appears as a playable character in Lego DC Super-Villains, voiced by Travis Willingham.
- The Court of Owls appear in Gotham Knights (2022). This version of the group is led by Bruce Wayne's uncle Jacob Kane as the Voice of the Court, has Penguin's mother Constance Cobblepot as a known member, and displays a feud with the League of Shadows. Additionally, Kirk Langstrom was a member of the Court before he conducted work with the League and was killed by the Talons for his betrayal.

=== Novels ===
- The Court of Owls appear in the tie-in novel Batman: The Court of Owls, by Greg Cox. Set shortly after the Court's comic debut, Batman's investigation into a missing arts student at Gotham University reveals said student had stumbled onto clues left in the artwork of a prominent artist from a century prior who reluctantly worked with the Court and had created a serum that could theoretically allow the user to see the future. Though the artist died before he shared the full formula with anyone, the Court has since begun attempting to recreate it, only for their efforts to incinerate test subjects. Batman's investigation reveals that the artist hid clues to Gotham's future in his artwork, ranging from fish in a fountain resembling the Jokerised fish to a statue of Janus directly in front of the court house where Harvey Dent would become Two-Face.
- The Court of Owls appear in the DC Icons novel Black Canary: Breaking Silence, written by Alexandra Monir.
