= Batman: Endgame =

Comic book story arc

- Publisher: DC Comics
- Publication date: October 2014 – April 2015
- Genre: Superhero
Title(s)
Batman (vol. 2) #35-40
- Main character(s): Batman; Joker

Creative team
- Writer: Scott Snyder
- Penciller: Greg Capullo
- Inker: Danny Miki
- Letterer: Steve Wands
- Colorist: FCO Plascencia
- Editor: Mark Doyle

"Batman: Endgame" is a six-issue comic book story arc first published by the comic book publishing company DC Comics in 2014, featuring the fictional superhero Batman. Written by Scott Snyder and drawn by Greg Capullo, it is set after the events of Batman Eternal; the story involves the return of Batman's arch-enemy, the Joker, following his disappearance in the 2012 story arc "Death of the Family".

== Publication history ==
Written by Scott Snyder with art by Greg Capullo, "Endgame" was first printed in October 2014, in Batman #35. The Joker's role as the story arc's central villain was not announced, and was detailed only in the issue's final pages, revealing the character would return to comics for the first time since his disappearance at the end of the "Death of the Family" (DotF) story arc in 2012, also written by Snyder. Snyder described "Endgame" as the concluding chapter of his Joker story, initially set up in "Zero Year" with a possible origin for the New 52 Joker, and continued with "Death of the Family" highlighting how Joker initially found meaning in his relationship with Batman. "Endgame" details how Joker reacts to Batman's perceived betrayal of their dynamic. Snyder said: "So this is really sort of the Joker saying, 'I once found meaning in our relationship and your relationship to your rogues. Now I think you've betrayed that, and it's time for me to just burn everything down'. So I guess that's where I'm coming from with this". The story was planned in part from the conclusion of Snyder and Capullo's work on "Death of the Family", and Snyder wanted to convey the message that Joker and Batman's bond had been broken, by having the Joker turn Batman's closest allies against him, the Justice League. "Endgame" celebrates the 75th anniversary of Batman and the Joker's debut and is designed as a transitional story that will alter the status quo of the Batman universe so that Snyder and Capullo can explore new elements afterwards.

Snyder described coming up with original ways for the human Batman to take on the superhuman Justice League as difficult. He chose to focus on Batman using means to incapacitate the members instead of neutralizing them completely, to avoid hurting his closest friends outside of the members of his Bat-family. Snyder and Capullo discussed the major points of each issue before Snyder began writing the script, so that Capullo could provide input on how to convey the action scenes. In one instance he suggested conveying the Flash's speed by having him tear away a piece of Batman's armor, and the rest of the action occurring within the timespan it takes for the piece to fall to the ground.

Issue #39 sees the Joker chop off Alfred's hand. Snyder originally considered this scene for DotF, with the Joker mailing the hand to Batman. Snyder considered that as the former story represented love, and "Endgame" representing hatred, the story needed to show that the stakes were high and that anything could happen with the Joker, even him entering the Batcave. Similarly, he felt that this story was the only place that would allow for Batman to team up his rogues gallery to defeat the Joker's ultimate plan.

In a February 2015 interview, Snyder stated that it was the last time he had plans to feature the Joker during his stint on Batman, but did not rule out the possibility that he would change his mind in the future. Snyder described "Endgame" as a horror to "Death of the Family"'s comedy, at least from the perception of the Joker, with all of the main characters escaping relatively unharmed in DotF. "Endgame" deliberately uses a darker color scheme to represent this tone, as the Joker intends to burn everything down for Batman's rejection in DotF. "Endgame" was intended to be Snyder's and Capullo's final story on Batman.

== Plot ==
Following a fear-chemical attack by the Scarecrow, Batman recovers in his new base of operations; a safehouse seized from the Court of Owls. Suddenly, Batman is attacked by Wonder Woman, who is determined to kill him. Batman instructs his butler Alfred to enact plan "Fenrir", a powerful, robotic-armor designed by Batman to do battle with the entire Justice League, flanked by a gas attack that evacuates Gotham City's citizens from the area. He manages to subdue Wonder Woman, the Flash, and Aquaman, but he is then attacked by Superman and thrown into the Gotham Royal Theater. When Batman asks who has manipulated the League into killing Batman, Superman's mouth stretches into a wide-grin as he and the subdued league members begin to laugh.

Batman battles the merciless Superman, finally subduing him with Kryptonite-laced gum. The League is revealed to be infected with a more powerful strain of Joker toxin, customized to each individual. Batman visits the Joker's former cell at the abandoned Arkham Asylum, where he meets with Eric Border, an orderly at the new Arkham Manor. Border states that he has only tried to help the city and Batman since arriving there, but he sees now that Batman cannot be helped. Batman is locked in Joker's cell, while Border removes his makeup to reveal himself as the Joker, having been using muscle relaxants and drugs to mask his appearance. The Joker confesses he now finds Batman boring following their final encounter, and now intends to bring their relationship to a permanent end. Batman is incapacitated by a paralytic gas, as the Joker announces that he will be left helpless as his plan truly begins.

Batman eventually recovers from his paralysis to find that the Joker has released an incurable airborne pathogen throughout Gotham, transmitted by laughter, that makes the victim look like the Joker, and turns feelings of love into violent hatred, triggering mass chaos. Batman travels to Gotham Presbyterian hospital to research the first recorded infection, but finds an infected Joe Chill, the man who murdered his parents, and a recreation of the night Batman's parents died, revealing the Joker knows his identity. Batman is able to save Duke Thomas from Chill and the mob of infected, but not his parents. Meanwhile, James Gordon researches the hospital and finds images appearing to be the Joker, taken decades before the Joker's first encounter with Batman. The Joker attacks Gordon, who responds by shooting the Joker dead. While Gordon phones Batman to relay the news, the Joker rises up and incapacitates Gordon. As Batman screams for Gordon, the Joker picks up the phone and responds "Hello, Bruce".

Batman finds Gordon dying, with an axe lodged in his chest. Gordon is revealed to be infected, and he suddenly attacks Batman, but is subdued by Alfred's daughter, Julia. With Nightwing's aid, Batman deduces that the Joker is using a serum capable of healing him from fatal damage, and that the virus contains the serum's complete inverse. They also discover that Paul Dekker, a crazed genius in regenerative technologies, was released into Border's custody a year earlier. Batman confronts Dekker, who reveals that he was only able to develop the healing serum and virus using a rare, natural component found in the Joker's spine; Dekker believes the Joker is immortal. He injects himself with a serum given to him by the Joker, believing it will make him immortal, but it kills him. Julia informs Batman that a search has revealed images of the Joker tracing back through centuries of Gotham's history, and that if a cure to the virus is not found, the infected will die within 24 hours. Desperate, Batman turns to the Court of Owls for aid.

The Court refuses to aid Batman, but he confronts their Talon assassin Uriah Boone, who has survived since the beginning of Gotham, about the Joker's supposed immortality. Meanwhile, the Joker uses his regenerative abilities to survive the long swim into the Batcave and its defenses. Alfred attempts to subdue the villain, but the Joker chops off his hand before absconding with Batman's crime-fighting trophies. Joker then leads a parade through the city, leading floats bearing the trophies through the infected citizens. Batman rallies his family and several of his greatest foes to band together against the Joker to save the city they all share. Seeing their combined efforts, the Joker prepares for his "best trick of all".

Batman battles the Joker, but he and his allies are subdued by Joker's lethal gas. The Joker removes Batman's mask, revealing that Nightwing was pretending to be Batman as a distraction, while the real Batman searched the cave system beneath Gotham that the Joker would have traveled after falling off the cliff during the end of "Death of the Family". Batman finds a cave rigged with Joker's explosives and housing a pool of Dionesium, the healing fluid that grants Joker his regenerative abilities.

The Joker confronts Batman and detonates the explosives. As the cave begins to collapse, he and Batman battle, gravely wounding each other. Batman injects the Joker with an immune-response blocker, having deduced that he hasn't really lived as long as others claim, but is using the Dionesium. When the Joker attempts to stab a subdued Batman, he is pushed into the path of a falling stalactite which breaks his back. As he desperately tries to crawl to the pool to heal, he is restrained by Batman until the cave roof falls and destroys the pool. Resigned to their fate, Batman reveals that the Joker has failed, as Batman gave his allies small doses of Dionesium, to protect them from Joker's poison, while he has recovered a larger amount of the Dionesium for Julia to cure the citywide plague. The Joker and Batman lie on the floor as the cave collapses upon them.

In the aftermath, Alfred refuses to have his hand reattached, asserting that he no longer has someone to tend to, while Dionesium recovered by Batman and given to Julia allows the city to be cured of Joker's plague. Discussing Batman's final letter, Alfred asserts that the story of Batman would always end in tragedy, and that while Batman had the resources to be immortal and escape death as the Joker offered, he was determined to only live in the time he had and "smile at the void". The note is shown, bearing only the word "Ha", mirroring Joker's final message to him at the end of "Death of the Family".

== Reception ==
=== Sales ===
The launch issue of the story-arc was DC Comics' best-selling title in October, selling an estimated 118,860 units. It was the sixth-best selling title overall, behind the first issue of the AXIS X-Men and Avengers storyline (138,966), Death of Wolverine #3 (141,567), the launch of the female-led Thor (150,862), Death of Wolverine #4 (165,582), and The Walking Dead #134 (326,334). Batman #36 was DC Comics' top-selling title of November, and the third highest-selling title of the month with an estimated 115,183 units. Batman #37 was the best-selling comic of December with an estimated 113,255 units sold. Alongside The Amazing Spider-Man's 104,739 units, it was the only other title to sell more than 100,000 units that month. Batman #38 was one of only four comics to sell more than 75,000 units in January, moving approximately 110,232 units ahead of The Amazing Spider-Man #12 (105,458) and #13 (103,093), and behind Star Wars #1 (985,976). This also made it DC Comics best selling title of the month. For February, Batman #39 was DC Comics best-selling title and the fifth-best selling title based on 118,106 units sold.

Issue	Published	Estimated no. of units sold	Sales chart position	Ref.
#35	October 2014	118,860	6	
#36	November 2014	115,183	3	
#37	December 2014	113,255	1	
#38	January 2015	110,232	2	
#39	February 2015	118,106	5	
#40	April 2015	131,128	4	

== Collected editions ==
Title	Material collected	Published date	ISBN
Batman Vol. 7: Endgame	Batman #35-40	September 2015	978-1401261160
Joker: Endgame	Batman Annual #3, Gotham Academy: Endgame #1, Batgirl: Endgame #1, Detective Comics: Endgame #1, Arkham Manor: Endgame #1 and material from Batman #35-39	October 2015	978-1401258771
Batman by Scott Snyder & Greg Capullo Omnibus Vol. 2	Batman #34-52, Detective Comics #27, Batman Annual #3-4, Batman: Futures End #1, DC Sneak Peek: Batman #1, Detective Comics #1000, Batman: Last Knight on Earth #1-3	November 2021	978-1779513267
