= The Return of the Joker =

Storyline in Batman Comics

- Cover of Batman #451, the conclusion to "Return of the Joker" art by Norm Breyfogle.
- Publisher: DC Comics
- Publication date: July – July 1990
- Genre: Superhero
- Title(s): Batman #450-#451
- Main character(s): Batman; Joker

Creative team
- Writer(s): Marv Wolfman, Darren Vincenzo
- Artist: Norm Breyfogle
- Penciller(s): Jim Aparo, Craig Rousseau
- Inker(s): Mike DeCarlo, Rob Leigh
- Letterer(s): John Constanza, Tim Harkins
- Colorist(s): Adrienne Roy, Chris Chucky
- Editor: Dennis O'Neil

The Return of the Joker is a story line in Batman Comics, featuring a villain posing as Joker, Batman's archenemy.

== Plot ==
The story opens with a judge found dead by hanging. While investigating the case, Commissioner Gordon comes to believe that the Joker is the culprit. Batman sends his ward, Tim Drake, to study in Tokyo to spare him from Jason Todd's fate. The Joker then attacks an investment party, stealing cash and jewels from the audience.

Gordon feels something is different about how the Joker operates and concludes that this Joker is an impostor. Meanwhile, in his hideout, the genuine Joker fumes at his name being wrongly used. While still recovering from the near-death experience he suffered in the "Death in the Family" story line, he decides to regain his confidence by committing a series of crimes as his old alter-ego, the Red Hood.

After regaining his self-confidence, the Joker goes after the impostor with Batman in pursuit. Both Jokers meet in a violent confrontation in which the real Joker gains the upper hand. Batman and the police stop them, but both of the Jokers escape. The impostor lures his three pursuers to the chemical plant where the Joker was born. To become like his idol, the impostor jumps into the vat of toxic waste, which disfigures the Joker — only for him to die instantly. Batman arrests the real Joker, who willingly gives up.

== Continuity ==
"The Return of the Joker" is the continuing story arc after "A Death in the Family". The Joker's origins were depicted before in "The Man Behind the Red Hood!" story-arc, which was later re-imagined in the one-shot graphic novel Batman: The Killing Joke.

== In other media ==
This comic series was also represented in a storyline in Batman: The Animated Series, which was then further continued in the animated series Batman Beyond for the film Batman Beyond: Return of the Joker.
