= Superman: Whatever Happened to the Man of Tomorrow? =

1986 comic book story

Whatever Happened to the Man of Tomorrow?
- Superman #423 (Sept. 1986), cover art by Curt Swan and Murphy Anderson.

Publication information
- Publisher: DC Comics
- Genre: Crossover
- Publication date: June 1986
- Main character: Superman

Creative team
- Written by: Alan Moore
- Penciller: Curt Swan
- Inker(s): George Pérez; Kurt Schaffenberger
- Letterer: Todd Klein
- Colorist: Gene D'Angelo
- Editor: Julius Schwartz

Collected editions
- Trade Paperback: ISBN 1563893150
- DC Universe: The Stories of Alan Moore: ISBN 1401209270
- 2009 Deluxe Edition: ISBN 1401223478
- 2020 Deluxe Edition: ISBN 1779504896

Whatever Happened to the Man of Tomorrow? is a 1986 American comic book story published by DC Comics, featuring the superhero Superman. Written by British author Alan Moore with help from long-time Superman editor Julius Schwartz, the story was published in two parts, beginning in Superman #423 and ending in Action Comics #583, both published in June 1986. The story was drawn by long-time artist Curt Swan in one of his final major contributions to the Superman titles and was inked by George Pérez in the issue of Superman and Kurt Schaffenberger in the issue of Action Comics. The story was an imaginary story which told the final tale of the Silver Age Superman and his long history, which was being rebooted following the events of Crisis on Infinite Earths, before his modern introduction in the John Byrne series, The Man of Steel.

Moore wanted his plot to honor the long history of the character and to serve as a complete conclusion to his mythology. The story is a frame story set 10 years after Superman was last seen, where Lois Lane recounts the tale of the end of Superman's career to a reporter from the Daily Planet. Her story includes numerous violent attacks against Superman by his enemies, the public revelation of his secret identity of Clark Kent and a number of deaths of those closest to him.

The story has been cited as one of the best stories of the character of Superman, and critics and audiences frequently choose it as one of the most memorable comics ever published. It is used as an example of how to close the long-time continuity of a comic book character. The story's legacy has endured with similar stories written as tributes to it. The title is a reference to one of the nicknames of Superman as the Man of Tomorrow and was later again used in the title of another Superman comic book series.

In the DC Multiverse, this story takes place on Earth-423 (a reference to Superman #423, the comic issue which launched the story).

== Background ==
The comic book Action Comics #1, published in April 1938 by National Allied Publications (later renamed DC Comics), marked the first publication of the character of Superman created by Jerry Siegel and Joe Shuster. The comic quickly became a success and its editor soon realized that it was because of the popularity of the character. In an unprecedented move at the time, National Allied Publications introduced a second comic book, Superman, exclusively featuring the popular character.

In the next few decades of publication, Superman underwent significant changes as a character, with new characters being introduced and changes in his history. Although the character was supposedly the same as ever, there were conflicting details of his origin by the early 1960s, including where he worked as a reporter and the fact that he was supposedly in two separate original teams of heroes, both as an honorary member of the Justice Society of America and as a full member of the Justice League of America, the latter of which included a number of heroes who had replaced the originals in the Justice Society. This conflict was resolved in an issue of The Flash #123 (Sept. 1961), "Flash of Two Worlds". The story introduced the idea of the DC Multiverse, which presented the idea that these original heroes from the Golden Age were from Earth-2, while the current generation of heroes were from Earth-1. This created an infinite number of worlds on which any number of conflicting stories could occur. This resolved the many conflicts in Superman's history at the time.

The Multiverse, however, allegedly turned out to be too complicated. DC Comics wanted more readers for their comics and decided that they would ease the confusion of new readers by getting rid of the Multiverse. They would accomplish this in the 1985 12-issue limited series Crisis on Infinite Earths. DC decided that, with the series, they could reboot the history of many of its characters, including Superman, leading to the idea of a last in-continuity story for the character.

== Production ==
With the conclusion of Crisis on Infinite Earths, the fictional continuity of the Silver Age that had begun in the 1950s was closed. From October to December 1986, all of the regular Superman comic books were not published to allow for the publication of the limited series The Man of Steel, which would reboot Superman's continuity. Outgoing editor Julius Schwartz decided to "make believe" his last two issues of Superman and Action Comics were the actual last two issues ever.

Initially, Schwartz wanted Superman co-creator Jerry Siegel to write the story as a way to book-end the character, but Siegel was unable to do so due to legal restrictions. While at a convention, Schwartz asked British writer Alan Moore, who had been developing the character of the Swamp Thing extensively, to be the writer of this final story. Moore pored over the extensive history of Superman and created a roadmap that would complete the stories and characters. To draw the story, Schwartz chose definitive Superman artist Curt Swan, who had been drawing the character in various publications since Superman #51 in 1948.

== Plot ==
The story was originally published in Superman #423 and Action Comics #583 (both dated September 1986). The first half of the story, published in Superman, was billed as the comic's "Historic Last Issue" as it was retitled The Adventures of Superman with #424.

=== Part 1: Superman #423 ===
Daily Planet reporter Tim Crane interviews Lois Lane – who has married a man named Jordan Elliott – for a story about the last days of Superman, as she is the last person to have seen him before his disappearance ten years prior. Lois explains that a period of relative peace had ensued after four of Superman's most dangerous enemies were rendered inactive; Brainiac had been damaged beyond repair, Lex Luthor had gone missing, and Parasite and Terra-Man killed each other. With no one left to fight against, Superman dedicated himself to conducting research in space. Upon returning from an expedition, Superman finds Metropolis destroyed at the hands of Bizarro, who until then was a well-meaning being endowed with a reversed reasoning that leads him to perform the opposite of his intentions. When Superman demands an explanation, Bizarro reveals his plan to become the "perfect imperfect duplicate": since Superman is a superhero who saves lives, Bizarro would become a villain who kills; since Superman's home planet of Krypton was accidentally destroyed and he came to Earth as a baby, Bizarro destroyed the Bizarro World himself and came to Earth as an adult; and since Superman is alive, Bizarro commits suicide with a piece of blue kryptonite.

At that time, Clark Kent had ceased to be a reporter for the Daily Planet and had become a news anchor alongside Lana Lang. The Toyman and the Prankster take advantage of this development to expose Superman's secret identity on live television: the pair send automated toys to attack the facilities and reveal Kent's invulnerability and uniform with a direct hit. The villains, communicating through one of the toys, reveal their involvement and that they had discovered Kent's identity through his childhood friend Pete Ross, whom they had tortured and killed. Superman tracks the broadcast radio waves and finds their location. During Ross' funeral, Superman voices his concern that three adversaries who were formerly only nuisances had become murderers, and worries that his more murderous enemies may reappear even worse. While Superman abandons the identity of Clark Kent, Lex Luthor searches an Arctic wasteland for the remains of Brainiac, hoping to study him. Brainiac's robotic skull proves sentient upon recovery, and it takes control of Luthor mentally and physically. Planning to exact revenge against Superman, the Luthor-Brainiac hybrid builds a new ship and takes his fight to Superman personally, kidnapping the Kryptonite Man along the way.

After saving the Daily Planet staff from an assault by an army of Metallos, Superman takes Lois, Lana, Jimmy Olsen, Perry White and his wife Alice to his Fortress of Solitude for their safety. Superman's dog Krypto joins them, having returned from deep space. At this moment, the Legion of Super-Heroes visits from the 30th century, accompanied by Supergirl. Superman is shocked to see his cousin alive, as she had recently died in his time, though he spares Supergirl this detail when she wonders how she is able to be here when the laws of time travel disallow multiple versions of the same person from occupying the same period. The Legion gives Superman a gift, a small statue of himself holding the Phantom Zone projector, and Superman fears that the Legion is visiting him on this specific day to pay their last respects before his death.

=== Part 2: Action Comics #583 ===
Action Comics #583, cover art by Curt Swan and Murphy Anderson.

The next morning, Superman's fears begin to materialize: the Legion of Super-Villains arrives from the future, stating that according to legend, Superman faces his greatest enemy this day and will cease to exist. The Luthor-Brainiac hybrid erects a force-field around the Fortress to prevent other heroes (including Batman, Wonder Woman, Captain Marvel and others) from interfering. In the ensuing battle, Jimmy and Lana use artifacts from the Fortress's trophy room to acquire superpowers and aid Superman in the standoff. Lana subdues the Kryptonite Man while Jimmy successfully shuts down the force-field generator; though the force-field mysteriously remains intact. Luthor briefly overcomes Brainiac's influence and begs Lana to kill him; she complies, snapping his neck. The Legion of Super-Villains kills Lana, while Brainiac maintains control over Luthor's corpse and murders Jimmy. A new attack on the Fortress breaches its walls, allowing the Kryptonite Man to rush in. He is ambushed and killed by Krypto, who succumbs to radiation poisoning in the process. Superman flies into a rage upon discovering Lana's death, and the Legion of Super-Villains is frightened into fleeing back to their own time.

After Brainiac deactivates when Luthor's body goes into rigor mortis, Superman realizes that not all of his old foes have yet been accounted for, and that the last one, Mister Mxyzptlk, must be behind such bizarre events. Mxyzptlk emerges, sheds his outer facade as a "funny little man", and reveals that after hundreds of years of being merely mischievous, he had become bored and began a new villainous phase in his immortal life. As Superman and Lois flee, they suddenly realize the significance of the statue Superman received, and Superman threatens Mxyzptlk with the Phantom Zone projector. Mxyzptlk panics and says his own name backwards, which sends him back to the Fifth Dimension; at the same time, Superman activates the projector, sending Mxyzptlk into the Phantom Zone. Mxyzptlk dies as he is torn in half between dimensions. Superman, in penance for breaking his own code against killing, voluntarily enters a chamber containing a sample of gold kryptonite — which permanently strips him of his powers — and disappears into the Arctic. Although Superman's body is never found, it is assumed by all parties that the powerless hero died of exposure.

After Crane concludes his interview and leaves, Lois and Jordan's son Jonathan plays with a piece of coal as the couple comment on how much Jordan prefers a normal life; this and the name of their son implies that Jordan is really the de-powered Superman. As Jonathan squeezes the coal into a diamond, Jordan winks to the reader, as he and Lois continue to "just live happily ever after".

== Collected editions ==
The story was originally reprinted in 1997, in trade paperback format. In 2006, DC pulled the original trade paperback from the market and inserted it, along with Batman: The Killing Joke, into a revised edition of Across the Universe: The Stories of Alan Moore (now retitled DC Universe: The Stories of Alan Moore). The initial printing of this collection omitted the introduction essay at the start of the story, though this was corrected with later printings of the collection.

In 2009, DC Comics re-released the story again as a stand-alone hardcover. The new version collected the original story as well as additional Alan Moore-penned Superman material: Superman Annual #11 (featuring the story "For the Man Who Has Everything") and DC Comics Presents #85, which features a team-up between Superman and the Swamp Thing. The 2009 edition features a cover drawn by Brian Bolland after Curt Swan and Murphy Anderson's Action Comics #583 cover. A trade paperback of this edition was released in 2010 (ISBN 978-1-4012-2731-9). This edition was re-issued in December 2020, featuring the same cover artwork from the original 1997 collection, based on the Superman #423 cover.

- Superman: "Whatever Happened to the Man of Tomorrow?" (trade paperback, 48 pages, 1997, DC Comics, ISBN 1-56389-315-0)
- DC Universe: The Stories of Alan Moore (trade paperback, 2006, Titan Books ISBN 1-84576-257-6 DC Comics ISBN 1-4012-0927-0)
- Superman: Whatever Happened to the Man of Tomorrow? Deluxe Edition, hardcover, 126 pages, 2009, DC Comics ISBN 1401223478)
- Superman: Whatever Happened to the Man of Tomorrow? The Deluxe Edition (2020 Edition), hardcover, 2020, DC Comics ISBN 1779504896)

== Reception ==
The ending of Whatever Happened to the Man of Tomorrow? has been cited as one of the most memorable moments in DC Comics history, and one of the most memorable "imaginary stories". The deaths of Bizarro and Krypto are considered some of the best moments in comic history, while the plot is generally considered one of the best by Moore.

The story is generally positively viewed. The blog "Girls Gone Geek" described the story as "touching, haunting and playful in all the right places" and "a great read whether you're a hardcore comics lover or a casual reader with only basic knowledge of Superman" and added that "the level of poignancy that Moore achieved here is rare because the medium doesn't often allow for it". A public vote of the users on the website "Comic Book Resources" named it the 25th best storyline in comics of all time.

Many Superman writers who worked with the character after the story cite it as a favorite of theirs in Superman's history. J. Michael Straczynski, who claimed that if he could only write one character for the rest of his life, it would be Superman, called the story the greatest Superman story ever. Scott Snyder also claimed the story to be among his favorites, while George Pérez claimed that although he was only the inker in the story, it was one of the best moments of his career.

== Legacy ==
During the 1990s, Alan Moore revisited many of the themes of the story in the comic Supreme, originally created by Rob Liefeld as a pastiche of Superman. Displeased with the rebooted Superman by John Byrne, and his own comics revisionism from the 80s, Moore decided to recreate the imaginative range of the original Superman mythos with Supreme.

The story's title was homaged in Neil Gaiman's 2009 "Batman: Whatever Happened to the Caped Crusader?". Writer Grant Morrison, at the time, was placing many of the Silver Age elements of Batman's history back into continuity. Similar to Whatever Happened to the Man of Tomorrow?, there was to be a change in the status quo of the Batman titles where the original Batman, Bruce Wayne, had apparently been killed and was being replaced by Dick Grayson. Gaiman's story was meant to serve as a memorial to the original Batman and was set at Batman's funeral. Similarly to the Superman story, the Batman story appeared in the two main Batman titles at the time and were published in a month before a short break on all Batman titles for the publication of the limited series "Batman: Battle for the Cowl".

“Whatever Happened to the Man of Tomorrow?” was also an inspiration for James Gunn's 2025 film ''Superman'', set in the DC Universe.

== Other appearances ==
In the Superman/Batman comic book series, an older Superman from a future timeline appears wearing the same costume that Superman wore in Kingdom Come. In 2005, at the closing moments of the "Absolute Power" story arc in Superman/Batman and with the intervention of Metron, the future Superman manages to change the timestream and with it, he becomes Jordan Elliot, ready to live happily ever after.
