= Batman (comic book) =

American comic book series

- Cover of Batman #1 (spring 1940) art by Bob Kane and Jerry Robinson

Publication information
- Publisher: DC Comics
- Schedule: List: Quarterly: #1–5 Bimonthly: #6–80; #254–259 Eight times a year: #81–168 Nine times a year: #169–177; #238–246 10 times a year: #178–237 Seven times a year: #247–253 11 times a year: #260–270 Monthly: #271–715 except for biweekly status for #436–439, 448–453, 464–469, 477–482, 492–497, 627–628, 643–644, 660–661, 682–683, and 691–692
- Format: Ongoing series
- Genre: Superhero
- Publication date: List: (vol. 1) Spring 1940 – August 2011 (vol. 2) September 2011 – May 2016 (vol. 3) June 2016 – May 2026 (vol. 4) September 2025 – present
- No. of issues: List: (vol. 1): 715 (#1–713 plus issues #0 and #1,000,000), one Special and 28 Annuals (vol. 2): 57 (#1–52 plus issues #0 and #23.1–23.4), one Special and four Annuals (vol. 3): 163 plus a DC Rebirth one-shot, nine Specials and seven Annuals (vol. 4): 14 (as of October 2026 cover date)
- Main characters: Batman; Batman Family

Creative team
- Written by: List: (vol. 1) Bill Finger Don Cameron Denny O'Neil David V. Molnár Len Wein Gerry Conway Grant Morrison (vol. 2) Scott Snyder (vol. 3) Tom King James Tynion IV Joshua Williamson Chip Zdarsky (vol. 4) Matt Fraction
- Penciller: List: (vol. 1) Bob Kane Jerry Robinson Dick Sprang Sheldon Moldoff Carmine Infantino Bob Brown Irv Novick Neal Adams Ernie Chan Mike Grell Don Newton Gene Colan Jim Aparo Tony Daniel (vol. 2) Greg Capullo (vol. 3) David Finch Mikel Janin Clay Mann Joëlle Jones Mitch Gerads Jorge Jiménez (vol. 4) Jorge Jiménez
- Inker: List: Jerry Robinson Charles Paris Joe Giella Dick Giordano Frank McLaughlin Alfredo Alcala Sandu Florea (vol. 2) Jonathan Glapion Danny Miki (vol. 3) Danny Miki
- Letterer: List: (vol. 4) Clayton Cowles
- Colorist: List: (vol. 1) Adrienne Roy (vol. 2) FCO Plascencia (vol. 3) Jordie Bellaire June Chung Tomeu Morey (vol. 4) Tomeu Morey

Collected editions
- Dark Knight Archive Volume 1: ISBN 1-56389-050-X

Batman is an ongoing superhero American comic book series published by DC Comics, featuring the character of the same name as its protagonist. The character, created by Bill Finger and Bob Kane, first appeared in Detective Comics #27 (cover dated May 1939). Batman proved to be so popular that a self-titled ongoing comic book series began publication with a cover date of spring 1940. It was first advertised in early April 1940, one month after the first appearance of his new sidekick, Robin the Boy Wonder.

Though the Batman comic book was launched as a quarterly publication, it later became a bimonthly series through the late 1950s, after which it became a monthly publication.

In September 2011, The New 52 rebooted DC's continuity. In this new timeline, the original Batman series ended at issue #713 and was relaunched with a new first issue (cover dated November 2011). Batman (vol. 2) ran until issue #52.

In 2016, DC Comics began a new relaunch of its entire line of titles called DC Rebirth, which continued continuity from the New 52. The Batman comic book was relaunched again with a new #1 issue (August 2016) and placed on a twice-monthly release schedule. The series continued through the next major relaunch by DC Comics, called "Infinite Frontier", reverting to a monthly schedule with issue #106 (May 2021).

In September 2025, the series relaunched again under the DC All In initiative, though due to delays, the third volume continued publishing after the fourth had begun.

== Publication history ==
=== The Golden Age ===
Batman made his first appearance as the lead feature of the anthology series Detective Comics #27 in May 1939. The character's popularity in Detective Comics led the publisher to launch a new title entirely dedicated to stories about Batman – a step they had only taken previously once before, with the Superman series. Batman began publication in the spring of 1940, with stories written by Bill Finger and illustrated by Bob Kane, though Finger went uncredited for years thereafter. The first issue was published on April 24, 1940, containing four original stories introducing new characters who would become notable recurring villains of Batman's rogues gallery: two stories with the Joker, one with Hugo Strange and one with Catwoman. The series was published quarterly until issue #5 (Spring 1941), and bimonthly afterwards. Alfred Pennyworth, the Wayne family butler, was introduced in issue #16 (April–May 1943). In 2021, a near mint issue of Batman #1 was sold for over $2.2 million at Heritage Auctions, setting a record for the most expensive Batman comic sold.

Editor Whitney Ellsworth assigned a Batman story to artist Dick Sprang in 1941. Anticipating that Bob Kane would be drafted to serve in World War II, DC inventoried Sprang's work to safeguard against delays. Sprang's first published Batman work was the Batman and Robin figures on the cover of Batman #18 (Aug.-Sept. 1943), reproduced from the art for page 13 of the later-published Detective Comics #84 (Feb. 1944). Sprang's first original published Batman work, and first interior-story work, appeared in Batman #19 (Oct.-Nov. 1943), for which he drew the cover and the first three Batman stories, and penciled the fourth Batman story, inked by Norm Fallon. Like all Batman artists of the time, Sprang went uncredited as a ghost artist for Kane.

After issue #21 (Feb.-March 1944) the number of Batman stories per issue was reduced from four to three. Instead, a four-page backup feature The Adventures of Alfred began in issue #22 (April–May 1944) showing Alfred's comedic attempts to become a detective. The Adventures of Alfred ran in the pages of Batman until issue #36 (Aug.-Sept. 1946).

Villains which debuted during this early era included the Mad Hatter in issue #49 (Oct.-Nov. 1948) and Killer Moth in issue #63 (Feb.-March 1951). In 1953, Sheldon Moldoff became another one of the primary Batman ghost artists who, along with Win Mortimer and Dick Sprang, drew stories credited to Bob Kane, following Kane's style and under Kane's supervision. Bill Finger and Moldoff introduced Ace the Bat-Hound in #92 (June 1955).

=== The Silver Age ===
The early part of the era known to comics fans and historians as the Silver Age of Comic Books saw the Batman title dabble in science fiction. New characters introduced included Mr. Freeze and Betty Kane, the original Bat-Girl.

In 1964, Julius Schwartz was made responsible for reviving the faded Batman titles. He jettisoned the sillier aspects that had crept into the series such as Ace the Bat-Hound and Bat-Mite and gave the character a "New Look" that premiered in Detective Comics #327 (May 1964). Schwartz's first issue of the Batman title was #164 (June 1964) which was written by France Edward Herron and drawn by Sheldon Moldoff. The Riddler returned after an 18-year absence in #171 (May 1965). Among the new villains introduced during this period was Poison Ivy in #181 (June 1966). In the 1960s, Batman comics were affected by the popular Batman television series, with campy stories based on the tongue-in-cheek premise of the series.

Frank Robbins and Irv Novick became the comic's new writer and artist respectively with issue #204 (August 1968), and began shifting the tone of the series in a more serious direction. In issue #217 (December 1969), after the Batman television program's influence had died down, the character of Dick Grayson was written out of the main stories and sent off to attend college; Bruce Wayne and Alfred also moved out of Wayne Manor into a penthouse in Wayne Tower in the heart of Gotham City.

=== The Bronze Age ===
In 1970, Dennis O'Neil began writing stories for both Detective Comics and Batman. By issue #232 (June 1971) O'Neil had become the main writer on the Batman title, frequently collaborating with artist Neal Adams. O'Neil's early run as writer mainly featured original characters as villains; in issue #232 O'Neil and Adams introduced a new villain who would become a significant recurring antagonist, the mysterious immortal eco-terrorist Ra's al Ghul. Batman #237 (December 1971) featured a metafictional story by O'Neil and Adams which featured several comics creators appearing in the story and interacting with Batman and Robin at the Rutland Halloween Parade in Rutland, Vermont. In issue #251 (September 1973) O'Neil and Adams also revitalized the Joker by bringing him back to his roots as a homicidal maniac who murders people on a whim. Issues #254-261 (Jan.–Feb. 1974-March–April 1975) of the series were in the 100 Page Super Spectacular format, published bimonthly with several reprints of older stories included as backup features. O'Neil's run as the main writer on Batman concluded in 1975 with issue #268 (October 1975), although he would return to the title to write one-off issues several times afterwards.

The Robin backup feature, starring Dick Grayson as a student at Hudson University, was shifted from Detective Comics to Batman as of issue #227. Mike Friedrich remained the writer on the backup feature until issue #242; beginning with issue #244, the backup was written by Elliot S. Maggin until it was discontinued after issue #254.

O'Neil was followed as the main writer on Batman by David Vern Reed, who had previously written for the series in the early 1950s. The series reached its 300th issue with a June 1978 cover date and featured a story by writer David Vern Reed and artists Walt Simonson and Dick Giordano.

Len Wein became the writer of the series with issue #307 (January 1979) and in his first issue, created Wayne Foundation executive Lucius Fox, later portrayed by Morgan Freeman in the movies Batman Begins, The Dark Knight, and The Dark Knight Rises. Julius Schwartz ended his tenure as editor of the series with issue #309 (March 1979). After Wein, Marv Wolfman briefly wrote Batman and co-created the Electrocutioner in issue #331 (Jan. 1981).

Gerry Conway, then the writer for Detective Comics, began writing Batman as well with issue #337 (July 1981), assisted with plotting in his earliest few issues by Roy Thomas. Conway included long-form story arcs that ran through both Batman-centric titles, effectively writing them as a single twice-monthly series rather than two separate monthly comics. One of the developments of Conway's run was to relocate Batman and Alfred back to Wayne Manor. The Robin backup feature was once again included in Batman for issues #337-339 and #341-343, written by Conway, until the character of Dick Grayson was reintegrated into the main story. Together with artist Don Newton, Conway introduced Jason Todd in Batman #357 (March 1983) as part of the final story arc he wrote before leaving the title with issue #359 (May 1983).

Writer Doug Moench began his run on the title with issue #360, continuing the series' permanent crossover with Detective Comics. Jason Todd would assume the costumed identity of Robin in issue #368 (February 1984). Moench and artist Tom Mandrake created the character of Black Mask in Batman #386 (August 1985). Moench's longtime collaborator, artist Paul Gulacy made his DC Comics debut with a two-part story in issues #393-394. The title reached its 400th issue in October 1986 and featured work by several popular comics artists and included an introduction by novelist Stephen King.

=== Post-Crisis ===
Due to the events of the 1985 miniseries Crisis on Infinite Earths, the continuity of DC Comics was altered. Established characters were given the opportunity to be reintroduced in new ways. While the Batman series was not rebooted – with the Crisis noted to have passed in issue #392 (February 1986) – writer Frank Miller, who had previously worked on the limited series The Dark Knight Returns, and artist David Mazzucchelli retold the character's origin story for the new continuity in the monthly pages of Batman #404-407 (February–May 1987). The story, Batman: Year One, garnered high critical acclaim for its realistic interpretation of Batman's genesis, and its accessibility to new readers who had never followed Batman before. IGN Comics ranked Batman: Year One at the top of a list of the 25 greatest Batman graphic novels, saying that "no other book before or since has quite captured the realism, the grit and the humanity of Gordon and Batman so perfectly." Notable comic book creators Greg Rucka, Jeph Loeb, and Judd Winick have cited Year One as their favorite Batman story.

Following Year One, writer Max Allan Collins and artist Chris Warner wrote a four-issue flashback story depicting a new origin for Jason Todd. The character was reinvented as an orphan from Crime Alley whom Batman first encountered trying to steal the Batmobile's tires, and was also given a more ruthless streak towards the more violent villains.

Jim Starlin, Jim Aparo, and Mike DeCarlo became the writer and artists of Batman with issue #414 (December 1987); Aparo would subsequently return as artist on the title several times over the next twelve years. One of their first storylines for the title was "Ten Nights of The Beast" in issues #417-420 (March–June 1988) which introduced the KGBeast. During Starlin's tenure on the title, DC Comics became aware of the fanbase's growing disdain for the character of Jason Todd. Following a cliffhanger in which the character's life hangs in the balance, DC set up a 900 number hotline which gave callers the ability to vote for or against Jason Todd's death. The kill option won by a narrow majority, and the following month the character was shown dying from wounds inflicted in the previous issue's cliffhanger. The story, entitled "A Death in the Family", received high media exposure due to the shocking nature in which a familiar character's life had ended. Cover artist Mike Mignola would illustrate the Elseworlds story Gotham by Gaslight the following year.

Marv Wolfman returned as writer on Batman with issue #436 (Early August 1989), initially with Pat Broderick as penciller and John Beatty as inker. Their first story arc, "Batman: Year Three", interwove flashbacks of a retelling of Dick Grayson's origin story. The flashbacks in the first issue also featured the first appearance of Tim Drake, who would ultimately become the third Robin, as "a very young child" who witnesses the murder of Dick Grayson's parents. The next story arc, "A Lonely Place of Dying", was a crossover with The New Titans, co-plotted by George Pérez. The arc re-introduced Tim Drake as a thirteen-year-old, with Aparo returning as interior penciler for Batman. The character revealed how, as a nine-year-old and years after the Grayson murders, he had recognized Robin as Dick Grayson. He subsequently deduced Batman's identity as well. Despite first donning the Robin costume in issue #442, Tim Drake did not become the new Robin immediately, with the remainder of Wolfman's run including the character only in subplots showing his training in criminal investigation, such as in "Crimesmith" and "The Penguin Affair".

The 1989 release of the film Batman, directed by Tim Burton, correlated with a significant increase in 1989 sales of the ongoing Batman comic titles. That year later became known as "The Year of the Bat". Capital and Diamond City Distributors reported that Batman surpassed sales of the top-selling Uncanny X-Men. Upon its launch in September, Batman: Legends of the Dark Knight – a series focusing on darker stories set early in Batman's crimefighting career – surpassed Batman to become the top-selling comic of that year. Batman #442 ultimately came in third place. Batman and Legends of the Dark Knight continued dominating comic sales charts into the first half of 1990 until being surpassed by Todd McFarlane's run on Spider-Man.

Norm Breyfogle became a cover artist for the main Batman title with issue #450, in "The Return of the Joker" storyline, a sequel to "A Death in the Family". Writer Alan Grant transferred from Detective Comics to the main Batman title with issue #455 (October 1990). Their first story arc together, with Breyfogle as both cover and interior artist, was "Identity Crisis". The story followed directly from their final arc on Detective Comics, "Rite of Passage." The three-issue "Identity Crisis" culminated in Tim Drake officially becoming the new Robin, with a redesigned costume, in issue #457 (December 1990). Breyfogle later pointed out that "Neal Adams was the one who designed the costume. The 'R' symbol and the staff were all that was really mine." Tim Drake then starred in the five-issue miniseries Robin before returning in Batman #465 (Late July 1991) for the story "Debut", depicting the new Batman and Robin team's first official mission together. Grant left the main Batman title with issue #480 (Late June 1992) for his own ongoing Batman title, Batman: Shadow of the Bat, where he was again partnered with Breyfogle for the first five issues.

Doug Moench returned as writer of the main Batman title with issue #481 (Early July 1992). Together with Chuck Dixon, writer of Detective Comics, Moench was a mastermind of the Knightfall crossover story arc which saw Batman's back being broken by the super-strong villain Bane. A new character, Jean-Paul Valley, officially takes up the Batman mantle in Bruce Wayne's absence and defeats Bane in issue #500 (October 1993). Valley is driven mad with power, and Wayne forcefully reclaims the mantle of Batman after his recovery. Jean-Paul Valley was subsequently spun off into his own ongoing series, Azrael, written by Dennis O'Neil. Following a tie-in to the event miniseries Zero Hour: Crisis in Time!, a special issue #0 was published featuring flashbacks to important events across Bruce Wayne's lifetime. The series was then included in the crossover story Prodigal, in which Dick Grayson temporarily fills the role of Batman for the first time.

Artist Kelley Jones began illustrating Batman with issue #515 (February 1995). Moench and Jones's work together on Batman was renowned for its surreal gothic imagery. The pair co-created the Ogre and the Ape in Batman #535 (October 1996). During Moench's tenure as writer, the Batman title was included in several more crossover stories including Contagion, Legacy and Cataclysm. Moench's second run ended with a special issue #1,000,000 (November 1998), a tie-in to DC One Million in which Batman is brought to the 853rd century.

The Batman titles in 1999 were dominated by the large crossover story arc "No Man's Land", which sees Gotham City ravaged by a large earthquake, leading to the U.S. government's order to evacuate the city and abandoning and isolating those who chose to remain behind. The main Batman comic was put in perpetual crossover with Detective Comics, Legends of the Dark Knight and Shadow of the Bat, with stories by multiple writers running through all four books. Greg Rucka, one of the writers of the crossover, adapted the story into a prose novel published in 2000.

After the conclusion to "No Man's Land", the Batman title was handled for seven issues by writer Larry Hama and artist Scott McDaniel. At issue #582, Ed Brubaker became the writer of the series and kept a trend of gritty crime drama that included more grounded villains such as the Penguin, Brubaker's new villain Zeiss, and Deadshot. Brubaker's run received a short interruption by the crossover story Officer Down, in which Commissioner Gordon is shot in the line of duty and ultimately retires from the Gotham police force, followed by a three-issue story arc by writer Brian K. Vaughan. Brubaker and Rucka masterminded the crossover story Bruce Wayne: Murderer? in which Bruce Wayne is framed for the murder of his girlfriend and is jailed. Issue #600 retitles the crossover story to Bruce Wayne: Fugitive as Batman escapes jail and temporarily abandons his Bruce Wayne identity altogether. The milestone issue featured three backup stories, presented as lost issues never before published from iconic eras in Batman's history: one presented in the style of Dick Sprang, one in homage to artists of the 1960s such as Gil Kane and Carmine Infantino, and one comedic story pencilled by Sergio Aragonés and written by stand-up comedian Patton Oswalt in his comic writing debut. After the conclusion of Bruce Wayne: Fugitive, Brubaker closed his run with two issues co-written with Geoff Johns.

The Batman series received a soft relaunch at issue #608 (December 2002) with the year-long storyline Batman: Hush by writer Jeph Loeb and artist Jim Lee. Loeb had previously written two year-long miniseries set during Batman's early crimefighting career: Batman: The Long Halloween (1996-1997) and its sequel Batman: Dark Victory (1999-2000). The 12-part "Hush" storyline was a murder mystery that delved through numerous periods in Batman's history, featured each of Batman's major villains in some important role, and introduced a new character that was the story's namesake. It also called into question the events surrounding Jason Todd's death. Hush was followed by a six-issue arc titled "Broken City" by the creative team of the Vertigo series 100 Bullets, a five-issue story arc "As the Crow Flies" by writer Judd Winick and the crossover story Batman: War Games. Judd Winick then became the ongoing writer for the series; his story Batman: Under the Hood revealed that Jason Todd had returned from the dead long ago and become the ruthless Gotham crime lord Red Hood. The final part of Winick's run as writer took place concurrently with the 2005-2006 event miniseries Infinite Crisis.

=== One Year Later ===
After Infinite Crisis, all the regular monthly titles of the DC Universe jumped forward in time by one year, depicting the characters in radically different situations and environments than they were in the preceding issues. Batman and Detective Comics were relaunched with the crossover story Face the Face, written by James Robinson, which saw Batman returning from a year-long overseas journey that retraced the steps he took after initially leaving Gotham City in his youth and featured the return of James Gordon to the role of Gotham City Police Commissioner.

Grant Morrison began their long-form Batman narrative in issue #655. The first story, "Batman and Son", reveals that Wayne is the father of a child named Damian, and attempts to steer the child away from the machinations of his mother, Talia al Ghul. From there, Morrison began a story arc that saw an evil influential organization known as the Black Glove attempt to destroy everything Batman is and what he stands for. This culminated in the storyline Batman R.I.P., where the Black Glove initially succeeds in doing so, but is thwarted by Bruce Wayne's ability to preserve his sane mind while an erratic, alternate personality takes over. Morrison's final two issues were tie-ins to the event miniseries Final Crisis, also written by Morrison. In Final Crisis, Batman appears to be killed by Darkseid but is revealed to have been transported to the distant past and stranded there. The next two issues of Batman starred the Batfamily in the wake of Batman's apparent death.

Neil Gaiman wrote issue #686, the first part of a two-part story titled Batman: Whatever Happened to the Caped Crusader? Structured in homage to Alan Moore's 1986 story Superman: Whatever Happened to the Man of Tomorrow?, it served as a quasi-send off to a generation of Batman stories. The story concluded in Detective Comics #853.

The main Batman series then went on hiatus during the publication of the miniseries Batman: Battle for the Cowl, which concluded with Dick Grayson assuming the role of Batman. The Batman books were relaunched under the banner "Batman Reborn", introducing Grayson as Batman and Damian Wayne as the new Robin, with Grant Morrison moving to a new series titled Batman and Robin. Writer Judd Winick temporarily returned to the title with issue #687 for Grayson's first solo arc as Batman, before handing the writing and art duties off to Tony Daniel with issue #692.

Grant Morrison temporarily returned to the Batman title for issues #700-702. The milestone issue #700 (August 2010) was set during the past, present and future of Batman, with different eras drawn by an art team consisting of Tony Daniel, Frank Quitely, Andy Kubert, and David Finch. Issues #701-702 (September – October 2010), titled "R.I.P.: The Missing Chapter", retold the events from the end of Batman: R.I.P. through to the end of Final Crisis from Bruce Wayne's point of view, leading into the miniseries Batman: The Return of Bruce Wayne.

Tony Daniel resumed writing and art duties with issue #704. Even after Bruce Wayne's return to the present day, Dick Grayson remained the star of the Batman series as the main Batman of Gotham. Issues #708-709 (May – June 2011) were part of the crossover story Batman: Judgment on Gotham written by David Hine.

On June 1, 2011, it was announced that all series taking place within the shared DC Universe would be either cancelled or relaunched with new #1 issues, after a new continuity was created in the wake of the Flashpoint event miniseries. The first volume of the Batman series concluded with issue #713, "Storybook Endings", published on August 17, 2011.

=== Volume 2 (The New 52) ===
As part of DC's company-wide title relaunch, The New 52, the second volume of Batman began publication on September 21, 2011. The main character was once again Bruce Wayne, with Dick Grayson having returned to his role as Nightwing. As with all of the books involved in the continuity reboot, the character of Bruce Wayne was made younger and was stated to have been a superhero for only five years; however, all four major Robins were accounted for as still having served at Batman's side in the new continuity. The second volume of Batman was almost in its entirety written by Scott Snyder and pencilled by Greg Capullo.

The first story arc of the volume, "The Court of Owls", focused on Batman's discovery of a secret society in Gotham City that he had never known about before, dating back to the time of Gotham's founding and his ancestor Alan Wayne, and his battles against the agents of the Court of Owls known as the Talons. The first major crossover of the New 52 era, "Night of the Owls", tied into the events of issues #8-9 (June – July 2012). In issue #7, Snyder and Capullo also introduced the character Harper Row, who would ultimately become the Gotham superhero Bluebird; issue #12 then depicted Harper Row's first encounter with Batman. Beginning with issue #8, the series began featuring backup stories written or co-written by James Tynion IV, who was Snyder's former student.

Issue #0 was published in September 2012 as part of DC's line-wide "Zero Month" event, depicting an incident set very early on in Bruce Wayne's crime-fighting career. The spin-off series Talon, focusing on a rogue Talon from the Court of Owls, debuted in the same month.

The second major story arc was named Death of the Family, a name-play on the classic story A Death in the Family, featuring the Joker as its main antagonist. While the main story was in Batman, various other series that featured Batman-related characters published tie-in story arcs.

Beginning in June 2013 with issue #21, the third major story arc was Batman: Zero Year, a new Batman origin story for the New 52 continuity. Prior to Zero Year, Batman's origins had not been retold in-continuity since Frank Miller's "Batman: Year One". The story arc also introduced a young version of Duke Thomas, who would later star in the series We Are Robin and ultimately become the Gotham superhero known as the Signal. In September 2013 the story arc paused for DC's line-wide "Villains Month" event: instead, four issues numbered #23.1-23.4 were published weekly with each focusing on a separate Batman villain (Joker, Riddler, Penguin and Bane). The story arc paused again in February 2014 to allow Greg Capullo more time to complete his artwork: issue #28 was thus illustrated by Dustin Nguyen, and acted as a prelude to the weekly series Batman Eternal that would begin two months later. Batman: Zero Year concluded with issue #33.

Once the Batman series returned to the present day, its next major story arc was "Batman: Endgame", in which the Joker returned as the main antagonist. The storyline ran from October 2014 to April 2015, with the series Batgirl, Detective Comics, Gotham Academy and Arkham Manor releasing tie-in one-shots over March and April. Endgame concluded with the apparent deaths of both Batman and the Joker in issue #40.

DC Comics began the DCYOU initiative in June 2015, which aimed to shake up the established status quo of the DC Universe. James Gordon thus took on the Batman mantle became the main character of the series for the next major story arc, Superheavy. Bruce Wayne was revealed to be alive but with no memories of his previous life, having started dating Julie Madison. Ultimately Bruce Wayne would regain his memories and become Batman again, with Gordon made Commissioner of the GCPD once again following the story arc's conclusion in issue #50.

Snyder and Capullo's run on the series concluded with issue #51, "Gotham Is". The second volume of Batman concluded with issue #52, "The List", published on May 11, 2016.

=== Volume 3 ===
As part of the mid-2016 line-wide comic relaunch DC Rebirth, which sought to restore aspects of the DC Universe from before the New 52, the Batman series was relaunched with a new volume and placed on a semi-monthly publishing schedule. The new volume was initially written by Tom King and illustrated by David Finch and Mikel Janín on alternating stories. It was preceded by the one-shot special Batman: Rebirth, which was co-written by Scott Snyder and also served as the lead-in to Snyder's new title All-Star Batman; the third volume of Batman began publication two weeks later on June 15, 2016.

The first twenty issues consisted of a trilogy of story arcs – I Am Gotham, I Am Suicide and I Am Bane – interspersed with two issues of the crossover story Batman: Night of the Monster Men (written by Steve Orlando) and the two-issue story arc Rooftops. They explored Batman's psychological aspects, introduced the new recurring superpowered character Gotham Girl, and rekindled the romance between Batman and Catwoman. The series crossed over with The Flash in issues #21-22 for the story The Button, one of the important instalments of the overarching DC Rebirth story; issue #22 was scripted by Joshua Williamson, writer of The Flash. The flashback story arc The War of Jokes and Riddles ran through issues #25 to #32, depicting a conflict between the Joker and the Riddler taking place a year after the events of Zero Year.

With Batman proposing marriage to Catwoman in issue #24, the following year of storytelling in Batman placed strong emphasis on their engagement. In the lead-up to the characters' wedding, DC Comics published a series of tie-in one-shots titled Batman: Prelude to the Wedding in 2018. Issue #50, "The Wedding", ended with Catwoman leaving Batman at the altar. The twist ending was spoiled by The New York Times three days before the publication of issue #50, prompting criticism of the newspaper from comic book retailers.

The series crossed over with The Flash again in issues #64-65, both written by Joshua Williamson, for the story arc The Price. Published in the middle of the story arc Knightmares and set shortly before it, The Price was a tie-in to the event miniseries Heroes in Crisis also written by King. Tom King's final story arc, Batman: City of Bane, saw the character Alfred Pennyworth killed by Bane in issue #77 (Late October 2019). Although initially planned as a long-form story lasting 100 issues, Tom King's run ended with issue #85 at the end of 2019. King would later return to the character of Batman in the 12-issue limited series Batman/Catwoman.

James Tynion IV became the main writer of the title, beginning with a backup feature in issue #85 followed by the first issue of the story arc Their Dark Designs in issue #86. Tynion's second story arc The Joker War was pencilled entirely by Jorge Jiménez; it included Batman losing the vast majority of his fortune and equipment along with Wayne Manor, as well as introducing the new recurring characters of the Joker's new sidekick Punchline, traumatized teenage vigilante Clownhunter, and Batman's old crime-fighting rival Ghost-Maker. Tie-ins to The Joker War were published in other Batman-related titles as well as the one-shot special Batman: The Joker War Zone (November 2020).

Along with the rest of DC's ongoing titles, Batman went on hiatus during January–February 2021 for the event Future State, which depicted a possible future of the DC Universe featuring a dystopian Gotham. As part of DC Comics' relaunch Infinite Frontier in March 2021, Batman resumed publication on a monthly schedule with newly-included backup features as of issue #106. Tynion remained as writer, while Jorge Jiménez became the main ongoing artist.

Tynion's final story arc Fear State followed up on the Future State event. Bracketed by one-shots Batman: Fear State: Alpha and Batman: Fear State: Omega, the main storyline ran in Batman (temporarily published semi-monthly), with tie-in stories published in other Batman titles and flashback one-shots detailing new characters' origins published under the title Batman Secret Files. Tynion's run on Batman ended with issue #117, followed by Batman: Fear State: Omega, after which he departed from DC Comics.

Joshua Williamson became the new writer of Batman in December 2021 with issue #118, along with Jorge Molina as the new artist. Williamson's seven-issue run consisted of the story arc The Abyss and two issues of the crossover story Shadow War.

Chip Zdarsky became the main writer on Batman with issue #125 (September 2022). Jorge Jiménez returned as artist for Zdarsky's first story arc, Failsafe.

In 2024, at New York Comic Con, it was announced that Jeph Loeb and Jim Lee would be taking over the monthly Batman title from Zdarsky and Jimenez for a two-part sequel to their 2002-2003 story arc Batman: Hush called Hush 2, starting with issue 158 in March 2025. It was also confirmed by Lee that Scott Williams, Alex Sinclair, and Richard Starkings would return as inker, colorist, and letterer respectively for the story and that it would be part of the All In initiative. Lee further explained "There's an initial six issues that are in the actual Batman continuity starting with Batman No.158, which comes out last week of March. And that runs six issues. It resolves that arc but it ends with a bit of a cliffhanger. And then Jeph and I are coming back for a final six to resolve the Hush saga, which would probably be in 2026."

=== Volume 4 ===
In February 2025, it was announced that, following the conclusion of the "Hush 2" storyline, Matt Fraction would write a fourth volume of the Batman ongoing in September that same year, with Jorge Jimenez providing the artwork.

== Annuals ==
The Batman series has had Annuals published beginning in 1961. Seven issues of Batman Annual were published from 1961–1964. An additional 17 issues were published from 1982 to 2000 and the numbering continued from the 1961 series. Writer Mike W. Barr and artist Trevor Von Eeden crafted Batman Annual #8 (1982) and Von Eeden has noted that it is "the book I'm most proud of, in my 25 year career at DC Comics. I was able to ink it myself, and also got my girlfriend at the time, Lynn Varley, to colour it - her first job in comics."

Four more Annuals were published from 2006 to 2011, again with the numbering continued from the previous series. In 2012, a new Annual series was begun with a #1 issue.

== Content and themes ==
The earliest stories appearing in the Batman comic book depicted a vengeful Batman, not hesitant to kill when he saw it as a necessary sacrifice. In one of the early stories, he is depicted using a gun and metal bat to stop a group of giant assailants and again with a group of average criminals. The Joker, a psychopath who is notorious for using a special toxin called Joker venom that kills and mutilates his victims, remains one of the most prolific and notorious Batman villains created in this time period. By the end of the Joker's second appearance in the series, Batman has, since his debut in Detective Comics, killed around nineteen people and one vampire in all, with the Joker having killed only thirteen people, and Robin one. Later, during the Silver Age, this type of supervillain changed from disturbing psychological assaults to the use of amusing gimmicks.

Typically, the primary challenges that the Batman faced in this era were derived from villains who were purely evil; however, by the 1970s, the motivations of these characters, including obsessive-compulsion, child abuse, and environmental fanaticism, were being explored more thoroughly. Batman himself also underwent a transformation and became a much less one-dimensional character, struggling with deeply rooted internal conflicts. Although not canonical, Frank Miller's The Dark Knight Returns introduced a significant evolution of the Batman's character in his eponymous series; he became uncompromising and relentless in his struggle to revitalize Gotham. The Batman often exhibited behavior that Gotham's elite labeled as excessively violent, as well as antisocial tendencies. This aspect of the Batman's personality was also toned down considerably in the wake of the DC-wide crossover Infinite Crisis, wherein Batman experienced a nervous breakdown and reconsidered his philosophy and approaches to his relationships.

Dennis O'Neil and Neal Adams' work in the early 1970s re-infused the character with the darker tones of the 1940s. O'Neil said his work on the Batman series was "simply to take it back to where it started. I went to the DC library and read some of the early stories. I tried to get a sense of what Kane and Finger were after." Comics historian Les Daniels observed that O'Neil's interpretation of Batman as a vengeful obsessive-compulsive, which he modestly describes as a return to the roots, was actually an act of creative imagination that has influenced every subsequent version of the Dark Knight." Currently, the Batman's attributes and personality are said to have been greatly influenced by the traditional characterization by Dennis O'Neil and Neal Adams' portrayals, although hints of the Miller interpretation appear in certain aspects of his character.

Before recent reappraisals and continuing debates over post-1975 alterations in Foucauldian biopolitics and genealogies, the story of A Death in the Family had been critiqued by notable scholars for anti-Arabism and Islamophobia, the latter of which can include the orientalist discourses found in the former, on two principal counts. First, Bruce Wayne initially arrived in Beirut and spoke Farsi, a language that may or may not have been more apposite for the maligned "radical Shiite captors" (e.g., early Hezbollah as "bandits-in-bedsheets") in control of the Beqaa Valley---his ultimate destination. The second count implicated the Joker, garbed in "Arab" attire depicted as "Iranian", Joker's reference to the "insanity" of Iran, as well as Batman's renunciation of Iran in world geopolitics. Superman's chastisement of Batman for his statements, and an encounter with Muslim (and Christian) "refugees", attempted to offset the vilification. In a 1990 issue of Detective Comics, written by Alan Grant, a tarot card reader contended, for an inquiring Batman, that the etymology of "joker" can be traced to the French échec et mat and, ultimately, to the Persian māt---to render helpless, kill, or eliminate from a game.

In addition to establishing Tim Drake as a principal character in Batman and Detective Comics, Lauren R. O'Connor argues that the storyline "A Lonely Place of Dying" served as the dénouement of a transition from Dick Grayson's "absent sexuality", which earlier incited reader interpretations of homosexuality, to definitive heterosexual presence in a bildungsroman narrative. O'Connor offers multiple examples from this 1989 storyline, such as Drake's encounter with Starfire (modeled after Iris Chacón) and Grayson's heeding of Drake's concerns over Batman's psychology, to substantiate the notion of a heterosexual bildungsroman subplot.

Lauren R. O'Connor contends that, for early Tim Drake appearances in the pages of Batman, writers such as Grant and Chuck Dixon "had a lexicon of teenage behavior from which to draw, unlike when Dick Grayson was introduced and the concept of the teenager was still nascent. They wisely mobilized the expected adolescent behaviors of parental conflict, hormonal urges, and identity formation to give Tim emotional depth and complexity, making him a relatable character with boundaries between his two selves." In the Robin ongoing series, when Drake had fully transitioned into an adolescent character, Dixon depicted him as engaging in adolescent intimacy with a romantic girlfriend, yet still stopped short at overt heterosexual consummation. This narrative benchmark, despite a consummation panel in an alternate Marvel-DC universe, maintained Robin's "estrangement from sex" that began in the Grayson years. Erica McCrystal likewise observes that Alan Grant, prior to Dixon's series, connected Tim Drake to Batman's philosophy of heroic or anti-heroic "vigilantism" as "therapeutic for children of trauma. But this kind of therapy has a delicate integration process." The overcoming of trauma entailed distinct identity intersections and emotional restraint, as well as a "complete understanding" of symbol and self. Bruce Wayne, a former child of trauma and survivor guilt, guided "other trauma victims down a path of righteousness". Tim Drake, for example, endured trauma and "emotional duress" as a result of the death of his mother (father in a coma and on a ventilator). Drake contemplated the idea of fear, and overcoming it, in the "Identity Crisis" storyline.. Grant and Breyfogle subjected Drake to recurrent nightmares, from hauntings by a ghoulish Batman to the disquieting lullaby (or informal nursery rhyme), "My Mummy's dead...My Mummy's Dead...I can't get it through my head," echoing across a cemetery for deceased parents. Drake ultimately defeated his own preadolescent fears "somewhat distant from Bruce Wayne" and "not as an orphan". By the end of "Identity Crisis", an adolescent Drake had "proven himself as capable of being a vigilante" by deducing the role of fear in instigating a series of violent crimes.

During his stint on Batman, Alan Grant also introduced new antihero antagonists, such as Black Wolf and Harold Allnut, to explore myriad conceptions of civil society and debates over socioeconomic, political, and cultural issues of the early 1990s. These antagonists and storylines, featuring themes of transgenerational trauma and collective culpability, warrant critical appraisal.

== Significant issues ==
=== First appearances ===
Appearance	Issue number	Month/Year
The Joker	#1	Spring 1940
The Catwoman (as "the Cat")	#1	Spring 1940
Gotham City (by name)	#4	Winter 1941
The Batmobile	#5	Spring 1941
Alfred Pennyworth (as 'Alfred Beagle')	#16	April–May 1943
The Mad Hatter I	#49	October–November 1948
Vicki Vale	#49	October–November 1948
Deadshot	#59	June–July 1950
Killer Moth	#63	February–March 1951
Mister Freeze (as "Mr. Zero")	#121	February 1959
Bat-Girl (Betty Kane)	#139	April 1961
Poison Ivy	#181	June 1966
Ra's al Ghul	#232	June 1971
Arkham Asylum	#258	October 1974
Lucius Fox	#307	January 1979
The Snowman	#337	July 1981
Jason Todd (later Robin)	#357	March 1983
Harvey Bullock	#361	June 1983
Black Mask	#386	August 1985
Holly Robinson	#404	February 1987
Sarah Essen Gordon	#405	March 1987
KGBeast	#417	March 1988
Tim Drake (later Robin)	#436	August 1989
Shondra Kinsolving	#486	February 1992
Cassandra Cain (later Batgirl)	#567	July 1999
David Cain	#567	July 1999
Hush	#609	January 2003
Red Hood (Jason Todd)	#635	December 2004
Damian Wayne	#655	September 2006
Professor Pyg	#666	July 2007
Terry McGinnis	#700	June 2010
Court of Owls	(vol. 2) #1	September 2011
Mr. Bloom	(vol. 2) #43	August 2015
Gotham Girl	(vol. 3) #1	June 2016
Punchline	(vol. 3) #89	February 2020
Clownhunter	(vol. 3) #96	August 2020
Ghost-Maker	(vol. 3) #100	October 2020
Failsafe	(vol. 3) #125	July 2022
Annika Zeller	(vol. 4) #1	September 2025
Minotaur	(vol. 4) #4	December 2025
The Ōjō	(vol. 4) #5	January 2026

== Collected editions ==
=== Batman (1940–2011) ===
Title	Material collected	Pages	Publication date	ISBN	Notes
Batman (vol. 1) Pre-Crisis
Batman: The Dark Knight Archives Volume 1	Batman #1-4	224	January 1992	978-1563890505	
Batman: The Dark Knight Archives Volume 2	Batman #5-8	224	November 1997	978-1563891830	
Batman: The Dark Knight Archives Volume 3	Batman #9-12	224	June 2000	978-1563896156	
Batman: The Dark Knight Archives Volume 4	Batman #13-16	224	August 2003	978-1563899836	
Batman: The Dark Knight Archives Volume 5	Batman #17-20	212	November 2006	978-1401207786	
Batman: The Dark Knight Archives Volume 6	Batman #21-25	228	December 2009	978-1401225476	
Batman: The Dark Knight Archives Volume 7	Batman #26-31	264	December 2010	978-1401228941	
Batman: The Dark Knight Archives Volume 8	Batman #32-37	248	January 2013	978-1401237448	
Batman: The Strange Deaths of Batman	Batman #291-294	160	January 2009	978-1401221744	
Batman (vol. 1) Post-Crisis
Batman: Second Chances	Batman #402-403, #408-416, Annual #11	280	July 2015	978-1401255183	
Batman: Year One	Batman #404-407	280	HC: March 1988; SC: June 1988	HC: 978-1401206901; SC: 978-1401207526	
Batman: Ten Nights of The Beast	Batman #417-420	96	October 1994	978-1563891557	
Batman: A Death in the Family	Batman #426-429	148	November 1998	978-1401232740	
Batman: The Many Deaths of the Batman	Batman #433-435	72	March 1992	978-1563890338	
Batman: The Caped Crusader Volume 1	Batman #417-425, #430-431, Batman Annual #12	320	August 2018	9781401281366	
Batman: The Caped Crusader Volume 2	Batman #432-439, #443-444, Batman Annual #13	304	February 2019	9781401287825	
Batman: The Caped Crusader Volume 3	Batman #445-454, Detective Comics #615, Batman Annual #14	328	September 2019	9781401294274	
Batman: The Caped Crusader Volume 4	Batman #455-465, Batman Annual #15	328	May 2020	9781779500304	
Batman: The Caped Crusader Volume 5	Batman #466-473, Detective Comics #639-640	248	January 2021	9781779506016	
Batman: The Caped Crusader Volume 6	Batman #475-483, Detective Comics #642	248	February 2022	9781779508003	
Batman: Hush Volume 1	Batman #608-612	128	August 2004	978-1401200602	
Batman: Hush Volume 2	Batman #613-619	192	November 2004	978-1401200923	
Batman: Hush Absolute Edition	Batman #608-619	372	December 2011	1-4012-0426-0	
Batman: Broken City	Batman #620-625	144	May 2005	978-1401202149	
Batman: As the Crow Flies	Batman #626-630	128	March 2005	978-1840239140	
Batman: Under the Hood Volume 1	Batman #635-641	176	November 2005	978-1401207564	
Batman: Under the Hood Volume 2	Batman #645-650, Annual #25	195	June 2006	978-1401209018	
Batman: Face the Face	Batman #651-654, Detective Comics #817-820	208	September 2006	978-1401209100	
Batman and Son	Batman #655-658, #663-666	128	HC: August 2007	HC: 1-4012-1240-9; SC: 1-4012-1241-7	
Batman: The Black Glove	Batman #667-669, #672-675	176	August 2008	978-1401219093	
Batman R.I.P.	Batman #676-683	224	June 2010	978-1401225766	
Batman: Long Shadows	Batman #687-691	128	May 2011	978-1401227203	
Batman: Life After Death	Batman #692-699	200	November 2011	978-1401229757	
Batman: Time and the Batman	Batman #700-703	128	December 2012	978-1401229900	
Batman: Eye of the Beholder	Batman #704-707, #710-712	168	November 2012	978-1401234706	

=== The New 52 (2011–2016) ===
Title	Material collected	Pages	Publication date	ISBN
Batman (vol. 2)
Batman Vol. 1: The Court of Owls	Batman (vol. 2) #1-7	176	May 2012	HC: 978-1401235413; SC: 978-1401235420
Batman Vol. 2: The City of Owls	Batman (vol. 2) #8-12, Annual (vol. 2) #1	208	March 2013	HC: 978-1401237776; SC: 978-1401237783
Batman Vol. 3: Death of the Family	Batman (vol. 2) #13-17	176	November 2013	HC: 978-1401242343; SC: 978-1401246020
Batman Vol. 4: Zero Year - Secret City	Batman (vol. 2) #21-24	176	May 2014	HC: 978-1401245085; SC: 978-1401249335
Batman Vol. 5: Zero Year - Dark City	Batman (vol. 2) #25-27, 29-33	240	October 2014	HC: 978-1401248857; SC: 978-1401253356
Batman Vol. 6: Graveyard Shift	Batman (vol. 2) #0, 18-20, 28, 34, Annual (vol. 2) #2	224	May 2015	HC: 978-1401252304; SC: 978-1401257538
Batman Vol. 7: Endgame	Batman (vol. 2) #35-40	192	September 2015	HC: 978-1401256890; SC: 978-1401261160
Batman Vol. 8: Superheavy	Batman (vol. 2) #41-46	176	March 2016	HC: 978-1401259693; SC: 978-1401266301
Batman Vol. 9: Bloom	Batman (vol. 2) #47-50	176	September 2016	HC: 978-1401264628; SC: 978-1401269227
Batman Vol. 10: Epilogue	Batman (vol. 2) #51-52, Annual (vol. 2) #4; Batman: Futures End #1; Batman: Rebirth #1	144	December 2016	HC: 978-1401267735; SC: 978-1401268329

=== DC Rebirth (2016–2021) ===
Title	Material collected	Pages	Publication date	ISBN
Batman (vol. 3)
Batman Vol. 1: I Am Gotham	Batman: Rebirth #1; Batman (vol. 3) #1-6	192	January 2017	978-1401267773
Batman: Night of the Monster Men	Batman (vol. 3) #7-8, Nightwing (vol. 4) #5-6, Detective Comics #941-942	144	February 2017	978-1401270674
Batman Vol. 2: I Am Suicide	Batman (vol. 3) #9-15	168	April 2017	978-1401268541
Batman Vol. 3: I Am Bane	Batman (vol. 3) #16-20, 23-24; Annual (vol. 3) #1	176	August 2017	978-1401271312
Batman/The Flash: The Button	Batman (vol. 3) #21-22	104	October 2017	978-1401276447
Batman Vol. 4: The War of Jokes and Riddles	Batman (vol. 3) #25-32	208	December 2017	978-1401273613
Batman Vol. 5: The Rules of Engagement	Batman (vol. 3) #33-37; Annual (vol. 3) #2	160	April 2018	978-1401277314
Batman Vol. 6: Bride or Burglar?	Batman (vol. 3) #38-44	161	July 2018	978-1401283384
Batman Vol. 7: The Wedding	Batman (vol. 3) #45-50	176	October 2018	978-1401280277
Batman Vol. 8: Cold Days	Batman (vol. 3) #51-57	176	December 2018	978-1401283520
Batman Vol. 9: The Tyrant Wing	Batman (vol. 3) #58-60, Annual (vol. 3) #3, Batman Secret Files #1	152	March 2019	978-1401288440
Batman Vol. 10: Knightmares	Batman (vol. 3) #61-63, 66-69	176	September 2019	978-1779501585
Heroes In Crisis: The Price and Other Tales	Batman (vol. 3) #64-65	248	October 2019	978-1401299644
Batman Vol. 11: The Fall and the Fallen	Batman (vol. 3) #70-74, Batman Secret Files #2	144	December 2019	978-1779501608
Batman Vol. 12: City of Bane Part 1	Batman (vol. 3) #75-79	144	April 2020	978-1401299583
Batman Vol. 13: City of Bane Part 2	Batman (vol. 3) #80-85, Annual (vol. 3) #4	208	July 2020	978-1779502841
Batman Vol. 1: Their Dark Designs	Batman (vol. 3) #86-94	176	October 2020	978-1779505569
Batman Vol. 2: The Joker War	Batman (vol. 3) #95-100	176	February 2021	978-1779507907
Batman Vol. 3: Ghost Stories	Batman (vol. 3) #101-105, Annual (vol. 3) #5	183	June 2021	978-1779510631
Batman: Rebirth Collection Deluxe Edition Book One	Batman: Rebirth #1, Batman (vol. 3) #1–15	400	5 September 2017	978-1401271329
Batman/The Flash: The Button	Batman (vol. 3) #21–22, The Flash (Vol. 5) #21–22	96	17 October 2017	978-1401276447
Batman: Rebirth Collection Deluxe Edition Book Two	Batman (vol. 3) #16-32 and Annual #1	448	12 June 2018	978-1401280352
Batman: Rebirth Collection Deluxe Edition Book Three	Batman (vol. 3) #33–43, Annual (vol. 2) #2	328	11 December 2018	978-1401285210
Batman: Rebirth Collection Deluxe Edition Book Four	Batman (vol. 3) #44–57, DC Nation #0	344	9 July 2019	978-1401291884
Batman: Rebirth Collection Deluxe Edition Book Five	Batman (vol. 3) #58–63, #66-69, Annual (vol. 2) #3, Batman Secret Files #1	278	28 July 2020	978-1779503145
Batman: Rebirth Collection Deluxe Edition Book Six	Batman (vol. 3) #70-71, 73-85, Batman Annual #4, and Batman Secret Files #2	496	26 July 2022	978-1779515704

=== Infinite Frontier (2021–2023) ===
Title	Material collected	Pages	Publication date	ISBN
Batman (vol. 3)
Batman Vol. 4: The Cowardly Lot	Batman (vol. 3) #106–111, Infinite Frontier #0	168	September 2021	978-1779511980
Batman Vol. 5: Fear State	Batman (vol. 3) #112–117	160	March 2022	978-1779514301
Batman Vol. 6: Abyss	Batman (vol. 3) #118–121, 124	176	August 2022	978-1779516565
Batman: Shadow War	Batman (vol. 3) #122-123, Robin #13–14, Deathstroke Inc. #8–9, Shadow War: Alpha #1, Shadow War: Omega #1, Shadow War Zone #1	304	November 2022	978-1779517975
Batman Vol. 1: Failsafe	Batman (vol. 3) #125–130	176	March 2023	978-1779519931

=== Dawn of DC (2023–2024) ===
Title	Material collected	Pages	Publication date	ISBN
Batman (vol. 3)
Batman Vol. 2: The Bat-Man of Gotham	Batman (vol. 3) #131–136	240	August 2023	978-1779520425
Batman/Catwoman: The Gotham War	Batman (vol. 3) #137–138, Catwoman (vol. 5) #57–58, Batman/Catwoman: The Gotham War – Battle Lines #1, Batman/Catwoman: The Gotham War – Scorched Earth #1	272	June 2024	978-1779525987
Batman Vol. 3: The Joker Year One	Batman (vol. 3) #139-144	176	September 2024	978-1779524577
Batman Vol.4: Dark Prisons	Batman (vol. 3) #145-152	264	March 2025	978-1799500582

=== DC All In (2024–present) ===
Title	Material collected	Pages	Publication date	ISBN
Batman (vol. 3)
Batman Vol.5: The Dying City	Batman (vol.3) #153-157 and the lead story from #150	224	May 2025	978-1799501695

=== Batman (collected with Detective Comics) ===
- The Batman Chronicles
  - Volume 1 includes Batman #1, 192 pages, April 2005, ISBN 978-1-4012-0445-7
  - Volume 2 includes Batman #2-3, 224 pages, September 2006, ISBN 978-1-4012-0790-8
  - Volume 3 includes Batman #4-5, 192 pages, May 2007, ISBN 978-1-4012-1347-3
  - Volume 4 includes Batman #6-7, 224 pages, October 2007, ISBN 978-1-4012-1462-3
  - Volume 5 includes Batman #8-9, 192 pages, April 2008, ISBN 978-1-4012-1682-5
  - Volume 6 includes Batman #10-11, 192 pages, October 2008, ISBN 978-1-4012-1961-1
  - Volume 7 includes Batman #12-13, 192 pages, March 2009, ISBN 978-1-4012-2134-8
  - Volume 8 includes Batman #14-15, 192 pages, October 2009, ISBN 978-1-4012-2484-4
  - Volume 9 includes Batman #16-17, 160 pages, March 2010, ISBN 978-1-4012-2645-9
  - Volume 10 includes Batman #18-19, 168 pages, December 2010, ISBN 978-1-4012-2895-8
  - Volume 11 includes Batman #20-21, 168 pages, January 2013, ISBN 978-1401237394
- Batman: The Dynamic Duo Archives
  - Volume 1 includes Batman #164-167, 240 pages, March 2003, ISBN 978-1563899324
  - Volume 2 includes Batman #168-171, 216 pages, June 2006, ISBN 978-1401207724
- Showcase Presents: Batman
  - Volume 1 includes Batman #164-174, 552 pages, August 2006, ISBN 978-1401210861
  - Volume 2 includes Batman #175-188, 512 pages, June 2007, ISBN 978-1401213626
  - Volume 3 includes Batman #189-201, 552 pages, June 2008, ISBN 978-1401217198
  - Volume 4 includes Batman #202-215, 520 pages, July 2009, ISBN 978-1401223144
  - Volume 5 includes Batman #216-228, 448 pages, December 2011, ISBN 978-1401232368
  - Volume 6 includes Batman #229-244, 584 pages, January 2016, ISBN 978-1401251536
- Tales of the Batman: Don Newton, collects Batman #305-306, 328; Detective Comics #480, 483-497; and The Brave and the Bold #153, 156, and 165, 360 pages, December 2011, ISBN 978-1401232948
- Tales of the Batman: Gene Colan Volume One, collects Batman #340, 343-345, 348-351 and Detective Comics #510, 512, 517, 523, 528-529, 288 pages, August 2011, ISBN 978-1401231019

=== Batman-wide crossovers ===
These are crossovers that include most—if not all—of the Batman-related titles published at the time.

- Batman by Neal Adams Omnibus includes Batman #219, 232, 234, 237, 243-245, 251, 255, 640 pages, March 15, 2016, ISBN 1-40125-551-5
- Batman: Knightfall
  - Part One: Broken Bat collects Batman #491-497 and Detective Comics #659-663, 272 pages, September 1993, ISBN 1-56389-142-5
  - Part Two: Who Rules the Night collects Batman #498-500, Detective Comics #664-666, Batman: Shadow of the Bat #16-18, and stories from Showcase '93 #7-8; 288 pages, September 1993, ISBN 1-56389-148-4
  - Part Three: KnightsEnd collects Batman #509-510, Batman: Shadow of the Bat #29-30, Detective Comics #676-677, Batman: Legends of the Dark Knight #62-63, and Catwoman (vol. 2) #12; 304 pages, June 1995, ISBN 1-56389-191-3)
- Batman: Prodigal includes Batman #512-514, 288 pages, January 1998, ISBN 978-1563893346
- Batman: Contagion includes Batman #529, 264 pages, April 1996, ISBN 978-1563892936
- Batman: Legacy includes Batman #534-535, 224 pages, February 1997, ISBN 978-1563893377
- Batman: Cataclysm includes Batman #553-554, 320 pages, June 1999, ISBN 978-1563895272
- Batman: No Man's Land
  - Volume 1 includes Batman #563-566, 544 pages, December 2011, ISBN 978-1401232283
  - Volume 2 includes Batman #567-568, 512 pages, April 2012, ISBN 978-1401233808
  - Volume 3 includes Batman #569-571, 480 pages, August 2012, ISBN 978-1401234560
  - Volume 4 includes Batman #572-574, 552 pages, December 2012, ISBN 978-1401235642
- Batman: Officer Down includes Batman #587, 168 pages, August 2001, ISBN 978-1563897870
- Batman: False Faces includes Batman #588-590, 160 pages, March 2009, ISBN 1845767217
- Batman: Bruce Wayne, Murderer? includes Batman #599-600, 264 pages, August 2002, ISBN 978-1563899133
- Batman: Bruce Wayne, Fugitive
  - Volume 1 includes Batman #601 and #603, 160 pages, December 2002, ISBN 1-56389-933-7
  - Volume 2 includes Batman #605, 176 pages, March 2003, ISBN 1-56389-947-7
  - Volume 3 includes Batman #606-607, 176 pages, October 2003, ISBN 1-4012-0079-6)
- Batman: War Games
  - Act One - Outbreak includes Batman #631, 208 pages, March 2005, ISBN 978-1401204297
  - Act Two - Tides includes Batman #632, 192 pages, July 2005, ISBN 978-1401204303
  - Act Three - Endgame includes Batman #633, 200 pages, October 2005, ISBN 978-1401204310
- Batman: War Crimes includes Batman 643-644, 128 pages, February 2006, ISBN 978-1401209032
- Batman: Face the Face includes Batman #651-654 and Detective Comics #817-820, 192 pages, September 2006, ISBN 978-1401209100
- Batman: The Resurrection of Ra's al Ghul includes Batman Annual #26, Batman #670-671, Robin #168-169, Robin Annual #7, Nightwing #138-139, and Detective Comics #838-839), 256 pages, May 2009, ISBN 978-1401220327
- Batman: Whatever Happened to the Caped Crusader? includes Batman #686; Detective Comics #853; Secret Origins #36; Secret Origins Special #1; and Batman: Black and White #2, 128 pages, July 2009, ISBN 978-1401223038
- Batman: Gotham Shall Be Judged includes Azrael #14-18, Batman #708-709, Red Robin #22 and Gotham City Sirens #22, 200 pages, April 2012, ISBN 978-1401233785

=== With non-Batman titles ===
- A Lonely Place of Dying: collects Batman #440-442 and The New Titans #60-61, 116 pages, February 1990, ISBN 978-0930289638

== Adaptations in other media ==
Batman has had several adaptations that directly draw from iconic comic book storylines and arcs, bringing the essence of the comics to life in different media forms, primarily in animation and film. One of the most faithful adaptations is Batman: The Dark Knight Returns (2012-2013), a two-part animated film based on Frank Miller's seminal 1986 comic of the same name. This story follows an older Bruce Wayne returning to his role as Batman in a dystopian Gotham. Similarly, Batman: Year One (2011), another animated adaptation, takes inspiration from Frank Miller and David Mazzucchelli's 1987 comic of the same name, focusing on Batman's first year fighting crime and his alliance with Jim Gordon.

Batman: The Animated Series (1992-1995) is widely regarded as a seminal adaptation of the Batman mythos, blending original storytelling with elements drawn from the comics. Although the series created many of its own stories, it was heavily influenced by classic Batman comics. Episodes such as "Robin's Reckoning" are inspired by the origin of Robin as depicted in Detective Comics #38 (1940) Similarly, "The Laughing Fish" is adapted from a comic of the same name by Steve Englehart, featuring the Joker's fish-themed scheme. The series also set the stage for The New Batman Adventures (1997-1999), which continued and expanded upon the show's storylines, introducing new characters and elements from the comics.

=== Video games ===
The video game series Batman: Arkham (2009-2015), while featuring original storylines, includes significant influences from comic arcs like Under the Hood and Knightfall, most notably in Batman: Arkham Knight (2015). The Injustice video game series also adapts its narrative directly from the Injustice: Gods Among Us comic, where Batman leads a resistance against a tyrannical Superman.

== See also ==
- List of Batman comics
- List of DC Comics publications
- Catwoman (comic book)
- The Flash (comic book)
- Green Lantern (comic book)
- Harley Quinn (comic book)
- Superman (comic book)
- Wonder Woman (comic book)
