= Batman: Whatever Happened to the Caped Crusader? =

2009 Batman storyline

"Whatever Happened to the Caped Crusader?"
- Cover Batman (vol. 1), #686 (April 2009), art by Andy Kubert.
- Publisher: DC Comics
- Publication date: April 2009
- Genre: Superhero
- Title(s): Batman #686; Detective Comics #853
- Main character: Batman

Creative team
- Writer: Neil Gaiman
- Penciller: Andy Kubert
- Inker: Scott Williams
- Letterer: Jared Fletcher
- Colorist: Alex Sinclair
- Editor(s): Mike Marts; Janelle Siegel
- Hardcover: ISBN 1-4012-2303-6
- Paperback: ISBN 1401227244

"Whatever Happened to the Caped Crusader?" is a 2009 story featuring the DC Comics superhero Batman. The story is published in two parts in the "final" issues of the series Batman (#686) and Detective Comics (#853), released in February and April, respectively. Written by Neil Gaiman, pencilled by Andy Kubert and inked by Scott Williams, the story is purported to be the "last" Batman story in the wake of severe psychological trauma that Batman endures within the story Batman R.I.P. and his ultimate fate in Final Crisis.

The story's title is a reference to the backup stories published in DC Comics Presents from the early 1970s to the mid-1980s (which revisited various long-unused Golden Age and Silver Age characters and were all titled "Whatever Happened to (x)?") and is akin to writer Alan Moore's "last" Superman story "Superman: Whatever Happened to the Man of Tomorrow?".

== Publication history ==
In the introduction to the 1999 book Kurt Busiek's Astro City: Confession, Gaiman revealed that he, Kurt Busiek, and Kurt's wife Ann, had been in a car on the way to visit Scott McCloud when Gaiman and Busiek began a conversation about Batman. That conversation would eventually lead them to plot an idea about a theoretical Batman story. When the introduction was finally published in Gaiman's essay collection The View from the Cheap Seats, Gaiman revealed in a footnote that that idea had since been turned into one of his favourite sequences within the comic.

Gaiman described the job as something that he had to take part in: "It's one of those things where they phoned me up and said, 'This is what's going to be happening with Batman. Would you like to write the last issue of Batman and the last issue of Detective Comics? And when they make an offer like that, you say yes".

Gaiman asked artist Andy Kubert to make the artwork throughout the series represent various eras of notable artists that had worked on Batman. Major names of mention by Kubert include Jerry Robinson, Carmine Infantino, Neal Adams and more.

Like Whatever Happened to the Man of Tomorrow?, the two-issue tale presents a "final" Batman story. The Batman presented in the story is not necessarily the one from current DC Universe continuity, but rather an indeterminate amalgamation that pays homage to the entirety of the character's 70-year history.

The overall plot concerns the wake of Batman, taking place in the back of a small Gotham City bar. During the wake, a number of prominent figures from Batman's life each tell a tale of Batman and how he eventually died, giving multiple, unique histories of Batman, his life, and his death.

== Plot ==
=== Part 1: Batman #686 ===
The story begins over Gotham City, which the narrator describes as being "different". It is not quite the Gotham that he is accustomed to, but it is still intimately familiar to him. Outside the Dew Drop Inn in Crime Alley, Selina Kyle pulls up and enters. The bartender, Joe Chill, tells her that a group is gathered in the back. As Selina makes her way back, she arrives at a wake. Others soon arrive and enter the small room, including Two-Face, James and Barbara Gordon and the Joker. At the front of the room is an open coffin. As a casket containing the body of Batman is shown, the narrator says "That's me..." revealing that he is Batman and is viewing his own funeral.

Once everyone arrives, the eulogies begin. Every one of the eulogies is an account of how Batman died, but each story is different and often inconsistent with the others. Selina Kyle's eulogy relates the story of her relationship with Batman over the years, first as a criminal who tried to seduce him, later becoming a vigilante to get his attention and finally retiring to open a cat breeder's salon and sanctuary. Her tale ends with a story similar to the death of Robin Hood: Batman came to her store badly wounded, but instead of taking him to a hospital, she tied him to a couch and let him bleed to death. Alfred Pennyworth's eulogy is a bizarre account of Batman's formation. He tells of how Batman would spend long periods of time failing to apprehend any criminals, which only eroded his sanity further. To help him, Alfred hired several actor friends of his to pretend to be supervillains, beginning with a man named Eddie Nash to portray the Riddler, who had previously retired from acting after falling too deeply into character through method acting. Alfred himself took on the persona of the Joker to give Batman an "opposite number" to fight. The group would work together to keep Bruce happy and "alert" by perpetrating crimes reminiscent of those in Batman's Silver Age adventures, allowing him to "defeat" them and thus keep his fragile psyche and self-esteem together. Bruce eventually discovered the ruse but still would not give up being Batman. Ultimately, Batman was killed when Nash, who had become psychotic and believed himself to actually be the Riddler, shot Batman during a hostage incident. Batman describes this scenario of his death as "impossible".

Upon hearing these stories, Batman wonders if he is dead and a mysterious female shape appears next to him and says "Not yet". Batman asks what is going on and the voice replies "You're the World's Greatest Detective, Bruce. Why don't you figure it out?"

=== Part 2: Detective Comics #853 ===
Batman's wake continues, with Batman still an unseen spectator. Further eulogies are given by friends, associates and enemies alike. Betty Kane, the Mad Hatter, the Joker, Robin, Clayface, Harvey Bullock, Ra's al Ghul, and Superman each give differing accounts of Batman's death, but all of them contain the same theme: Batman never gives up or surrenders, even in the face of certain death.

Batman finally goes through a door that suddenly appears behind his casket. He enters a dark void and approaches a shaft of light. In the light, he sees that the woman that he has been speaking with is his mother, Martha Wayne. He has finally figured out what is happening: he is dying and having a near-death experience.

Batman understands that the stories he heard told do not seem to be about the same person, that the elements keep changing and he dies differently each time. But one thing remains constant: he is always Batman and Batman never gives up. He also accepts how his story will end, the only way it can end:

"The end of the story of Batman is, he's dead. Because, in the end, the Batman dies. What else am I going to do? Retire and play golf? It doesn't work that way. It can't. I fight until I drop. And one day, I will drop. But until then, I fight".

Martha confirms that this is the inevitable ending to Batman's quest, but also notes that Bruce was indeed truly happy for a small time when he was a child. She then tells Bruce his life is about to end and asks if he is ready. Bruce admits that he does not actually believe in an afterlife. Martha explains that:

"You don't get Heaven or Hell. Do you know the only reward you get for being Batman? You get to be Batman. And - when you're a child - you get a handful of years of real happiness. With your father. With me. It's more than some people get. You're done, now, Bruce. This time. You can stop fighting now... just for a few more years. It's over. Let it go".

Bruce then says goodbye to elements of his life in the form of Goodnight Moon, saying goodnight to his cave, his friends, his allies and his enemies. The final image of the story is the Bat-Signal in the night sky. The signal gradually transforms into a pair of doctor's hands, which reach for a newborn baby boy, who is handed to Martha Wayne in the hospital. She smiles down at the baby, calling him Bruce.

== Collected editions ==
The story is collected into a single volume:

- Batman: Whatever Happened to the Caped Crusader? (collects Batman vol. 1 #686 and Detective Comics vol. 1 #853 and three previous Batman-related Gaiman stories from Secret Origins vol. 2 #36 ("Pavane", a story in which Poison Ivy ultimately poisons a prison inspector who visits her), Secret Origins Special #1 ("When Is a Door Not a Door?", a story featuring a Gotham entertainment news program interviewing the Riddler in an attempt to understand and analyze Batman's enemies), and Batman Black and White #2 (a highly-meta story featuring Batman and the Joker going over lines for a fight between them before actually fighting one another and using the exact lines they had just rehearsed in a some sort of film being directed by Lobo); 128 pages, hardcover, July 2009, ISBN 1-4012-2303-6; paperback, August 2010, ISBN 1-4012-2724-4)
- The above are also collected in The DC Universe by Neil Gaiman, along with Green Lantern/Superman: Legend of the Green Flame, "On the Stairs" from Solo #8, and "Metamorpho, the Element Man" from Wednesday Comics #1-12. (224 pages, hardcover, October 2016, ISBN 9781401264888; 224 pages, paperback, February 2018, ISBN 9781401277734)

Both parts of the story also appear together in Titan Books' Batman Legends (Volume 2) #33.

== Awards ==
The storyline won the "Best Comic" SFX Sci-Fi Award in 2010. It won the 2009 British Fantasy Award for Best Comic/Graphic Novel. It also won the 2009 Goodreads choice award for Graphic Novel. In April 2010, it was nominated for the Hugo Award for Best Graphic Story.
