= The Man Behind the Red Hood! =

1951 comic book

- Publisher: DC Comics
- Publication date: February 1951
- Genre: Superhero
Title(s)
Detective Comics #168
- Main character(s): Batman, Robin, Red Hood (Joker)

Creative team
- Writer: Bill Finger
- Artist(s): Lew Sayre Schwartz, George Roussos
- Penciller(s): Lew Sayre Schwartz, Win Mortimer
- Inker: George Roussos
- Editor: Jack Schiff

"The Man Behind The Red Hood!" (1951) is a comic book story originally appearing in Detective Comics #168. It features Batman and a few university students trying to crack a decade-old case, and has the earliest origin story for the Joker.

== Plot summary ==
Batman and Robin have been asked by Dean Chalmers, head of Gotham University, to volunteer as teachers for his criminology class. Batman agrees.

Over the course of a month, Batman teaches the students many things and decides that they are ready for a real case—that of the "Red Hood". Batman gives the students clues about the mysterious burglar's crimes and encounters with Batman.

The students discover that the Red Hood decided to steal one million dollars from the Monarch Playing Card Company, but was thought to have been killed after jumping into a basin of the company's chemicals following a confrontation with Batman.

The Red Hood hears of the re-opening of the case and attacks the school. Finally, when Batman unmasks him, the Red Hood turns out to be the school gardener. Batman questions him and finds out that the school gardener had captured the real Red Hood and left him locked inside a tool shed. He decided to commit crimes and frame the real Red Hood.

Batman, Robin and the students discover that the "Red Hood" is in fact Batman's old nemesis, the Joker. The Joker explains that years ago, he was a lab worker who decided to steal from the Monarch Playing Card Company. After being thwarted by Batman, however, he jumped into the chemical waste to escape. He survived, but was left with his trademark green hair, chalk white skin, and red lips. Driven insane by the accident, he dedicated his life to getting revenge on Batman.

== Reprints ==
In addition to having been printed in Detective Comics #168, "The Man Behind The Red Hood!" has been reprinted in:

- Batman #213
- Batman Archives Vol.8 (ISBN 9781401233761)
- Batman In The Fifties (ISBN 9781563898105)
- Batman With Robin the Boy Wonder From the 30's to the 70's (ISBN 9780517190326)
- The Greatest Joker Stories Ever Told (ISBN 9780446391252)
- Limited Collector's Edition C-39

== Cultural impact ==
This story includes the first origin story of The Joker, Batman's greatest enemy. The Joker's origin from this comic has been used in various Batman-related media, including the 1989 film. The story would be updated in later storylines, including The Killing Joke and Zero Year. It was chosen as one of the comic books to represent "Batman In The Fifties" "Batman From The '30s To The '70s", and as one of "The Greatest Joker Stories Ever Told".
