= DC Universe: The Stories of Alan Moore =

2006 trade paperback comic collection

- Cover by Brian Bolland.
- Date: January 4, 2006
- Page count: 304 pages
- Publisher: DC Comics; Titan Books

Creative team
- Writer: Alan Moore
- ISBN: 978-1401209278

DC Universe: The Stories of Alan Moore (ISBN 978-1401209278) is a 2006 trade paperback collection of comic books written by Alan Moore for DC Comics from 1985 to 1988, published by Titan Books. This collection is a replacement for the earlier Across the Universe: The Stories of Alan Moore which contained all of the same stories except for "Whatever Happened to the Man of Tomorrow?" and The Killing Joke (with the original coloring).

== Stories ==
=== "For the Man Who Has Everything" ===
- Originally appeared in Superman Annual #11 (1985)
- Artist: Dave Gibbons
- Colorist: Tom Ziuko
- Letterer: Dave Gibbons

=== "Night Olympics" ===
- Originally appeared in Detective Comics #549-550 (April–May 1985)
- Artist: Klaus Janson
- Letterer: Todd Klein

=== "Mogo Doesn't Socialize" ===
- Originally appeared in Green Lantern #188 (May 1985)
- Artist: Dave Gibbons
- Colorist: Anthony Tollin
- Letterer: Todd Klein

=== "Father's Day" ===
- Originally appeared in Vigilante #17-18 (May–June 1985)
- Artist: Jim Baikie
- Colorist: Tatjana Wood
- Letterer: Annie Halfacree

=== "Brief Lives" ===
- Originally appeared in The Omega Men #26 (May 1985)
- Artist: Kevin O'Neill
- Colorist: Carl Gafford
- Letterer: Todd Klein

=== "A Man's World" ===
- Originally appeared in The Omega Men #27 (June 1985)
- Penciller: Paris Cullins
- Inker: Rick Magyar
- Colorist: Carl Gafford
- Letterer: Todd Klein

=== "The Jungle Line" ===
- Originally appeared in DC Comics Presents #85 (September 1985)
- Penciller: Rick Veitch
- Inker: Al Williamson
- Colorist: Tatjana Wood
- Letterer: John Costanza

=== "Tygers" ===
- Originally appeared in Tales of the Green Lantern Corps Annual #2 (1986)
- Artist: Kevin O'Neill
- Colorist: Anthony Tollin
- Letterer: John Costanza

=== "Whatever Happened to the Man of Tomorrow?" ===
- Originally appeared in Superman #423 and Action Comics #583 (September 1986)
- Artist: Curt Swan and George Pérez (Superman)

Curt Swan and Kurt Schaffenberger (Action Comics)

- Original Colorist: Gene D'Angelo
- Recolored by Tom McCraw
- Letterer: Todd Klein

=== "Footsteps" ===
- Originally appeared in Secret Origins #10 (January 1987)
- Artist: Joe Orlando
- Colorist: Carl Gafford
- Letterer: Bob Lappan

=== "Mortal Clay" ===
- Originally appeared in Batman Annual #11 (July 1987)
- Artist: George Freeman
- Colorist: Lovern Kindzierski
- Letterer: John Costanza

=== "In Blackest Night" ===
- Originally appeared in Tales of the Green Lantern Corps Annual #3 (August 1987)
- Penciller: Bill Willingham
- Inker: Terry Austin
- Colorist: Gene D'Angelo
- Letterer: John Costanza

=== "The Killing Joke" ===
- Originally appeared as Batman: The Killing Joke OGN (1988)
- Artist: Brian Bolland
- Colorist: John Higgins (original coloring)
- Letterer: Richard Starkings

== See also ==
- Alan Moore bibliography
