= Batman: The Killing Joke =

1988 graphic novel by Alan Moore and Brian Bolland

- Cover of Batman: The Killing Joke by Brian Bolland

Publication information
- Publisher: DC Comics
- Format: One-shot
- Genre: Superhero
- Publication date: March 1988
- No. of issues: 1
- Main characters: Batman; Joker; Jim Gordon; Barbara Gordon

Creative team
- Created by: Alan Moore; Brian Bolland; John Higgins
- Written by: Alan Moore
- Artist: Brian Bolland
- Letterer: Richard Starkings
- Colorist(s): John Higgins (original); Brian Bolland (Deluxe Edition)
- Editor: Dennis O'Neil

Collected editions
- Trade Paperback: ISBN 0930289455
- Trade Paperback (Titan Books): ISBN 1852860820
- DC Universe: The Stories of Alan Moore: ISBN 1401209270
- 2008 Deluxe Edition: ISBN 5012256263
- Noir: ISBN 140126364X
- Absolute Edition: ISBN 1401284124
- Novel: ISBN 1785658107
- 2019 Deluxe Edition: ISBN 1401294057

Batman: The Killing Joke is a 1988 DC Comics one-shot graphic novel featuring the characters Batman and the Joker written by Alan Moore, illustrated by Brian Bolland, and originally colored by John Higgins. The Killing Joke provides another origin story for the Joker, loosely adapted from the 1951 story "The Man Behind the Red Hood!", which was written by Batman co-creator Bill Finger. The Joker's supposed origin is presented via flashback, while simultaneously depicting his attempt to drive Jim Gordon insane and Batman's desperate attempt to stop him.

Created by Moore, Bolland, and Higgins as their own take on the Joker's source and psychology, the story became famous for its origin of the Joker as a tragic character; a family man and failed comedian who suffered "one bad day" that finally drove him insane. Moore stated that he attempted to show the similarities and contrasts between Batman and the Joker. The story's effects on the mainstream Batman continuity also included the shooting and paralysis of Barbara Gordon (a.k.a. Batgirl), an event that eventually leads her to develop the identity of Oracle, secret data broker for the DC Universe's superhero community and leader of the superhero team Birds of Prey.

Many critics regard the graphic novel as the definitive Joker story and one of the greatest Batman stories ever published. The comic won the Eisner Award for "Best Graphic Album" in 1989 and appeared on The New York Times Best Seller List in May 2009. In 2006, The Killing Joke was reprinted as part of the trade paperback DC Universe: The Stories of Alan Moore. In 2008, DC Comics reprinted the story in a deluxe hardcover edition, which featured new coloring by Bolland, with a more subdued palette than the original. Elements of The Killing Joke have inspired or been incorporated into other aspects of various Batman works.

== Background and creation ==
Artist Brian Bolland conceived the idea for the story after watching the 1928 film The Man Who Laughs, which features a character named Gwynplaine (played by Conrad Veidt) whose rictus grin inspired the visual design of the Joker. Bolland's rendition of the Joker was partially influenced by that film. DC editor Dick Giordano's invitation led directly to Bolland working with writer Alan Moore to create a plausible background story for the Joker. He recounted: "I thought about it in terms of who's my favorite writer at the moment, what hero I would really love to do, and which villain? I basically came up with Alan, Batman and the Joker".

Although the story takes pains to stress that it is merely one possible "origin story" for the Joker, it has been widely accepted and adopted into DC continuity, and editor Len Wein had to ask the publisher for approval of a central mutilation of long-running character Barbara Gordon. Bolland said that he saw "Judge Death [as] almost a dry run for drawing the Joker". He also recounted that "by the time Alan had finished Watchmen he had fallen out with DC to a certain extent... in the end, he only continued to do Killing Joke as a favor to me".

The 48-page prestige format one-shot comic took a considerable amount of time to produce. Both Moore and Bolland are well known for their meticulous and time-consuming work; both creators' then-recently finished 12-issue maxiseries titles – Moore's Watchmen and Bolland's Camelot 3000 – had seen delays. Bolland was aided by the laid-back attitude taken by DC, who he says "seemed prepared to let me do it at my own pace". The original editor, Len Wein, left the company, and was replaced by Dennis O'Neil, a "very hands-off sort of guy", with whom Bolland only recalls having one conversation about the book.

Bolland envisaged the flashback sequences in black and white, and instructed Watchmen colorist John Higgins to use "muted November colors". He was upset when he saw the finished comic had "garish... hideous glowing purples and pinks... and my precious Eraserhead-esque flashback sequences swamped in orange". The 2008-published 20th anniversary edition of the book featured new colouring by Bolland, restoring his artistic intentions to the palette. All the original artwork had long disappeared in the hands of collectors but DC figured out a way to reverse engineer the already colored prints to isolate the black & white from the colors. In addition to recoloring, Bolland also did a touchup on several of the characters' faces using Photoshop.

== Plot summary ==
Joker, before his accident, with his pregnant wife. Art by Brian Bolland and John Higgins.

An unnamed man quits his job at a chemical company to become a stand-up comedian, only to fail miserably. Desperate to support his pregnant wife, he agrees to guide two criminals through the chemical plant where he previously worked so that they can rob the playing card company next to it. The police inform him that his wife and unborn child have died in a household accident. Grief-stricken, the comedian tries to withdraw from the plan, but the criminals convince him into keeping his commitment.

At the plant, the criminals encounter security personnel, and a shootout ensues in which the comedian's two accomplices are killed. The comedian is then confronted by Batman. He flees by jumping into the chemical plant's waste pound lock and is swept through a pipe leading outside. He discovers to his shock that the chemicals have permanently bleached his skin chalk-white, stained his lips red and dyed his hair green. His disfigurement, compounded by the loss of his family, drives him completely insane and marks the birth of the Joker. He later admits that he is not sure whether this actually happened, as he tends to remember his past differently at different times.

The Joker, after emerging from the canal of chemical waste. Art by Brian Bolland and John Higgins.

In present day, Batman goes to Arkham Asylum to talk with the Joker about ending their years-long feud, only to find that the Joker has escaped. The Joker shoots and paralyzes Barbara Gordon and kidnaps her father, Commissioner James "Jim" Gordon. He takes Gordon to an abandoned amusement park, where he tortures and cages him in the park's freak show. He forces Gordon to view blown-up photos of a wounded Barbara, lying stripped nude and in pain on the floor after the shooting. He then puts Gordon on display before the park's freaks, ridiculing him as "the average man", a weakling doomed to insanity.

Batman's attempts to locate Commissioner Gordon are unsuccessful until the Joker sends him an invitation to the amusement park. Though traumatized by his ordeal, Gordon retains his sanity and moral code, and insists that Batman capture the Joker "by the book" to "show him that our way works". Batman dodges a series of booby traps while the Joker tries to persuade his nemesis that the world is a "black, awful joke" that is not worth fighting for, and it only takes "one bad day" to drive an ordinary man insane.

Batman subdues the Joker and tells him that Gordon is as sane as ever, and the Joker is alone in his madness. He offers to help the Joker rehabilitate in order to end their everlasting war, which Batman fears may one day result in a fight to the death. The Joker apologetically declines, saying it is too late for that. He says that the situation reminds him of a joke about two inmates in an asylum who try to escape. Batman chuckles at the joke's punchline, and as the two old foes share a laugh, he grabs the Joker as police arrive.

== Themes and analysis ==
The book explores Moore's assertion that, psychologically, "Batman and the Joker are mirror images of each other" by delving into the relationship between the two. The story itself shows how the Joker and Batman came to terms with their respective life-altering tragedies, which both eventually lead to their present lives and confrontation. Critic Geoff Klock further explained that "both Batman and the Joker are creations of a random and tragic 'one bad day'. Batman spends his life forging meaning from the random tragedy, whereas the Joker reflects the absurdity of life, and all its random injustice".

The torments that the Joker puts Commissioner Gordon through are meant to serve as "proof that there is something buried deep within each lunatic, a nugget of insanity, that is simply waiting for the right moment to spring forth". Unlike the Joker, however, Gordon emerges from his ordeal with his sanity and moral code intact. The story is also famous for returning Batman to his darker roots, which changed how the Modern Age of Comics perceived the character. The Killing Joke delves deep into the character's psychology, framing him as being just as insane as the Joker, and postulating that he and the Joker perceive the world according to differing points of view, with the Joker viewing the world as one big joke.

The final panels of the book have been the subject of interpretation and debate. According to one view, Batman and the Joker, who have been fighting for years, end all of their disputes by having a good laugh about it all. Another interpretation, popularized by comic writer Grant Morrison, is that Batman kills the Joker at the end of the story, hence the title "The Killing Joke". Grant Morrison acknowledges the ambiguous nature of the story's ending, which they believe is a part of its enduring appeal, with the original script providing no further information. Alan Moore has said that, despite the perceived ambiguity, his intention for the ending was for Batman and the Joker to simply share a moment of lucidity before their endless cycle began again.

The Joker serves as an unreliable narrator. He admits to his own uncertainty, as he has disparate memories of the single event ("Sometimes I remember it one way, sometimes another...If I'm going to have a past, I prefer it to be multiple choice!"), accentuating the comic's depiction of "a world unraveling toward relentless urban violence and moral nihilism".

== References in other storylines ==
=== "The King of Comedy" ===
In 1995, Alan Grant wrote a story entitled "The King of Comedy" which appeared in his series Batman: Shadow of the Bat in two parts (#37 and #38). In the story, the Joker kidnaps the audience members who heckled and made fun of him during the stand-up routine he mentions in The Killing Joke, while Batman and a revenge-seeking bounty hunter named Wild Norton try to track him down.

=== Oracle Year One: Born of Hope ===
In 1996, John Ostrander and Kim Yale wrote a story entitled "Oracle: Year One: Born of Hope" which appeared in The Batman Chronicles #5. The story consists of Barbara recounting the events of The Killing Joke from her perspective, and the immediate aftermath of those events, including her recovery from her injuries and her adoption of the Oracle mantle.

=== No Joke ===
In 2007, Geoff Johns wrote a companion story to The Killing Joke entitled "No Joke" that appeared in the series Booster Gold.

In the story, Booster Gold is charged by Rip Hunter to go back in time and save Barbara from being shot by the Joker. Booster arrives at the carnival and is attacked by Joker's freaks. He manages to escape, but arrives too late to save Barbara. Catching the Joker in the middle of taking photos of his victim, Booster attacks in a rage. The Joker nevertheless gains the upper hand, snapping several photos of Booster in the process. Rip returns Booster to the future before the Joker can murder him, but Booster demands to be sent back again. He fails several times until learning that the Joker is destined to paralyze her, as this prompts her to become Oracle. Rip did this to demonstrate that some points in time, like Barbara's paralysis, are fixed and cannot be altered, so that Booster would not continue insisting on rescuing his friend Ted Kord from death, another fixed point. The story also reveals that Batman kept the photos of Barbara and Booster, and had been waiting until Booster came of age before confronting him. Batman thanks Booster for trying to stop Joker and offers him his friendship. Eventually, Dick Grayson, who becomes the new Batman for a short time, would also learn about this and offer his thanks to Booster.

=== "Ladies' Night" ===
In 2010, writer J. Michael Straczynski and artist Cliff Chiang collaborated on a one-shot story called "Ladies' Night", which was published in the anthology series The Brave and the Bold. The story is set shortly before The Killing Joke and deals with Zatanna and Wonder Woman struggling to come to terms with the impending attack on Barbara after Zatanna has a precognitive dream about it. Like "No Joke", the story heavily implies that the heroines cannot alter Barbara's fate, despite their desire to do so, instead giving her a final night on the town before she loses the use of her legs. The story also implies that Wonder Woman served as the inspiration for Barbara Gordon's eventual codename of the Oracle.

=== The New 52 ===
When DC Comics relaunched its continuity in 2011, many of Batman's stories were erased from history or altered, but the events of The Killing Joke remained intact. In the new continuity, Barbara Gordon recovered from the paralysis after three years. Although she resumes her work as Batgirl one year after recovering her mobility, she continues to have posttraumatic stress disorder when exposed to gunfire that could result in receiving new spinal damage.

In March 2015, DC Comics released 25 Joker-themed variant covers for its various monthly series in celebration of the character's 75th anniversary. Among them was a cover to Batgirl #41 by artist Rafael Albuquerque that took its inspiration from The Killing Joke. The cover depicts the Joker standing next to a tearful Batgirl, who has a red smile painted across her mouth. The Joker has one hand holding a revolver draped over Batgirl's shoulder and is pointing to her cheek with the other hand, as if gesturing to shoot her. The cover quickly drew criticism for highlighting a dark period in the character's history, especially when juxtaposed with the youthful, more optimistic direction of the series at the time. The hashtag #changethecover drew dozens of posts on Twitter and Tumblr asking DC not to release the variant. DC ultimately withdrew the cover from publication at the request of Albuquerque, who said that he did not want to hurt or upset anyone through his art.

=== Three Jokers ===
The 2020 book Batman: Three Jokers features the Joker's pregnant wife, Jeannie, and includes more details about what happened to her.

== In other media ==
=== Film ===
==== Live action ====
- Along with The Dark Knight Returns, Tim Burton has mentioned that The Killing Joke influenced his film adaptation of Batman, specifically the origin of the Joker: "I was never a giant comic book fan, but I've always loved the image of Batman and the Joker. The reason I've never been a comic book fan — and I think it started when I was a child — is because I could never tell which box I was supposed to read. I don't know if it was dyslexia or whatever, but that's why I loved The Killing Joke, because for the first time I could tell which one to read. It's my favorite. It's the first comic I've ever loved. And the success of those graphic novels made our ideas more acceptable".
- Director Christopher Nolan has mentioned that The Killing Joke influenced the story, themes and Heath Ledger's performance as the Joker in the 2008 film The Dark Knight. The Joker's ambiguous, multiple-choice past and depiction as an unreliable narrator who provides various alternate possibilities of his origins, was inspired by the comic, as was the character's line "Madness is like gravity. All it takes is a little push", a nod to the Joker's philosophy in The Killing Joke that "All it takes is one bad day to reduce the sanest man alive to lunacy". In both stories, the Joker tries to corrupt one of Batman's allies by harming their loved ones. Ledger also stated in an interview that he was given a copy of the graphic novel as reference for the role.
- Writer/director Todd Phillips said that the Joker's descent into madness after an unsuccessful career as a stand-up comedian, his past as a struggling lower-class citizen, and his ambiguous past in The Killing Joke served as an inspiration for the narrative and thematic elements of the 2019 feature film Joker.

==== Animation ====
- The story is referenced in a flashback scene in the DC Universe Animated Original Movie, Batman: Under the Red Hood. Red Hood lures Batman (voiced by Bruce Greenwood) to the chemical factory where the Joker's (voiced by John DiMaggio) accident took place. The flashback then shows a fleeing Joker had attempted to escape while trying to claim that he was set up, only to accidentally fall into the chemicals that disfigure him. The film's villain, Jason Todd (voiced by Jensen Ackles) – whom the Joker had murdered, and who takes up his murderer's former criminal identity upon being returned to life by Ra's al Ghul (voiced by Jason Isaacs) – calls it Batman's greatest failure. Jason also obliquely refers to the Joker crippling Barbara.
- The Batman: The Killing Joke animated film was released on Blu-ray and DVD on August 2, 2016, and also played in select theaters in July. Sam Liu directed and Bruce Timm executive-produced the film. The Batman: The Animated Series castmates, Kevin Conroy, Mark Hamill, and Tara Strong, returned as Batman, the Joker, and Batgirl, respectively, alongside Ray Wise as Commissioner Gordon. The film received a mixed reception. The film's storyline follows the original comic, but also includes a new storyline involving Barbara's decision to retire as Batgirl after a crisis involving a Mafia war, as well as a brief sexual relationship between Batman and Batgirl that earned a particular amount of criticism from critics and fans.
- The Killing Joke was referenced several times in the interactive film adaptation of Batman: Death in the Family, which serves as a follow-up to Batman: Under the Red Hood. The film also reused the pictures the Joker took of Barbara in The Killing Joke animated film. If Batman sacrifices himself to save Jason, two possible scenarios can play out. If Jason chooses to disobey Bruce's dying wish, he meets the Joker at a diner. Joker reminisces about Batman by retelling Jason the same joke he told Bruce at the end of The Killing Joke before Jason stabs him to death. If Jason attempts to uphold Batman's moral code and arrest Joker without killing him, Joker reveals to him that he has been repressing all the times he killed criminals during his time as the Red Hood and has become more of a successor to the villain himself rather than Batman – all because of "one bad day".

=== Television ===
- In the pilot episode of the 2002 Birds of Prey television series, the pilot episode includes a version of the scene in which the Joker shoots Barbara in the spine, paralyzing her.
- The Killing Joke serves as inspiration for the characterization of Joker in The Batman. Additionally there have been many references throughout the series, such as Joker tormenting detective Ethan Bennet the same way Commissioner Gordon was, his origin story and his "one rotten day" speech, and him fighting Batman in a hall of mirrors in the episode "The Rubber Face of Comedy", Joker laughing menacingly along with the Penguin the same way Batman and Joker did in the episode "The Laughing Bat", and Barbara Gordon operating as Oracle in a potential future in the episode "Artifacts".
- In the FOX TV series Gotham (2014–19), story arcs involving the show's "Proto-Jokers", Jerome and Jeremiah Valeska (both played by Cameron Monaghan), are heavily influenced by The Killing Joke. Several scenes, themes, and lines of dialogue are directly taken from the comic. The episode "A Dark Knight: One Bad Day" takes inspiration from the Joker's observation that "All it takes is one bad day to reduce the sanest man alive to lunacy", and ends with Jeremiah shooting and paralyzing Selina Kyle (Camren Bicondova).
- In Young Justice, Barbara Gordon/Batgirl (voiced by Alyson Stoner) is introduced in Season 2, but is shown to become Oracle in Season 3 during the two-year time skip between seasons. In Season 4, it is revealed that Barbara was paralyzed after saving the Joker from an assassination attempt by Cassandra Cain. However, Barbara tells Cassandra she did not save the Joker for his sake, but to prevent Cassandra from becoming a killer.
- In Harley Quinn, the Joker shoots Batgirl when Harley Quinn meets with her to tell her that she's quitting the Bat-family at the end of "A Potato-Based Cloning Incident." In "Killer's Block", it's revealed that Batgirl is paralyzed from the waist down as Harley tortures the Joker for revenge, with Joker revealing he shot Batgirl after she exposed him for not being the one to kill Nightwing.

=== Video games ===
- In the 2008 video game Lego Batman: The Video Game, there is an alt featured in the game for The Joker called The Joker (Tropical), which shows him wearing a Hawaiian shirt, purple gloves and a sunhat, which looks very similar to the scene when he shoots and cripples Barbara Gordon in The Killing Joke, albeit with a few changes.
- In the 2011 video game Batman: Arkham City, the Joker (again voiced by Hamill) recounts his backstory from The Killing Joke to Hugo Strange (voiced by Corey Burton). When Strange expresses doubt at the Joker's story, the Joker admits that he prefers his origin story "to be multiple choice", repeating the line from the graphic novel.
- In the 2013 video game Injustice: Gods Among Us, a downloadable content Killing Joke pack includes three skins for the character from the story. It includes his Hawaiian attire, the Red Hood, and his hat and long coat.
- The 2013 video game prequel Batman: Arkham Origins, makes several references to The Killing Joke. When Batman (voiced by Roger Craig Smith) enters a carnival-themed room, the Joker (voiced by Troy Baker) tells him he got a great deal on an out-of-service amusement park, and jokes that "You should have seen the look on the real estate agent's face when we shook hands on the deal!", an allusion to the scene early in the graphic novel in which Joker cons the owner of a run-down amusement park out of the property, and then murders him. In a level depicting a psychiatric interview with Dr. Harleen Quinzel (voiced by Tara Strong), Joker is playable as the Red Hood, walking through the chemical plant that will end with his transformation into the Joker. Another scene shows him in an altercation with patrons at a comedy club who exhibited a poor reception to his act. Baker recites a monologue from the graphic novel.
- The 2015 video game Batman: Arkham Knight depicts the Joker's shooting of Barbara Gordon as one of the hallucinations Batman experiences.

=== Novel ===
Novelists Christa Faust and Gary Phillips wrote a novel adaptation of Alan Moore's story, published on September 25, 2018, by Titan Books.

=== Miscellaneous ===
- One of the two covers of the comic book Darkwing Duck Annual, published in March 2011, was a homage to Brian Bolland's cover of The Killing Joke.
- A fan-made audio drama adaptation of The Killing Joke was produced by a small group known as Cape Swoosh Productions and released on student radio in 2014 and was commended by Comic Book Resources for its fidelity to the source material.

== Reception and legacy ==
Although a one-shot, the events of The Killing Joke were adopted into ongoing comic book storylines. DC Comics officially retired Batgirl in the one-shot comic Batgirl Special #1 (July 1988), and when Barbara Gordon reappeared in the Suicide Squad series, she was in a wheelchair and became the computer hacker known as the Oracle. This event, along with a Batman storyline that takes place shortly afterward, "A Death in the Family", leads Batman's obsession with the Clown Prince of Crime to a personal level. The mantle of Batgirl would eventually be passed to successor Cassandra Cain and later, Stephanie Brown. Gordon's paralysis was later retconned into a temporary event that lasted only three years in DC Comics' 2011 line-wide title relaunch, The New 52, which saw her restored as the first and only Batgirl.

The graphic novel won the Eisner Award for Best Graphic Album and garnered Alan Moore the Best Writer award in 1989. Hilary Goldstein of IGN praised The Killing Joke, calling it "easily the greatest Joker story ever told" and adding that "Moore's rhythmic dialogue and Bolland's organic art create a unique story often mimicked but never matched". IGN declared The Killing Joke the third-greatest Batman graphic novel, after The Dark Knight Returns and Batman: Year One. James Donnelly of Pop Syndicate called The Killing Joke "one of the greatest comics of the 20th century". Van Jensen of ComicMix said: "Each time I read The Killing Joke I'm amazed all over again at how Alan Moore and Brian Bolland teamed to pack such intensity, ferocity and humanity into those pages". B.L. Wooldridge of Batman in Comics called the graphic novel "an incredible story, with Moore at his best and awe-inspiring art by painter Brian Bolland". Comics historians Robert Greenberger and Matthew K. Manning describe it as "the definitive Joker story of all time". Manning additionally called it "one of the most powerful and disturbing stories in the history of Gotham City".

Seb Patrick of Den of Geek also had a mixed response, calling The Killing Joke "one of the most revered and influential 'Batman' stories ever written and arguably the definitive Joker story", but adding that it's "not at the level of [Alan Moore's] true masterpieces such as Watchmen, V for Vendetta [and] The League of Extraordinary Gentlemen".

=== Creators' response ===
In a 2000 interview, and elsewhere, Moore has been critical of his work: "I don't think it's a very good book. It's not saying anything very interesting". Later qualifying that personal critique, he summarized the book saying: "I was making a point... '[that] there are a lot of similarities between Batman and the Joker'. That was the main point of The Killing Joke". In 2003, he further clarified why, with the benefit of hindsight, it was this view that leads him to consider it one his lesser works:

The Killing Joke is a story about Batman and the Joker; it isn't about anything that you're ever going to encounter in real life, because Batman and the Joker are not like any human beings that have ever lived. So there's no important human information being imparted...Yeah, it was something that I thought was clumsy, misjudged and had no real human importance. It was just about a couple of licensed DC characters that didn't really relate to the real world in any way.

Bolland gave his own thoughts on Moore's response in 2008:

The Killing Joke was not a project instigated by Alan, nor was it, as far as I know, a labour of love for him, and it doesn't usually appear in a list of his greatest works. I was glad he agreed to write it, though.

In a 2004 interview with Wizard magazine, Moore was also critical about his decision to disable Barbara Gordon: "I asked DC if they had any problem with me crippling Barbara Gordon – who was Batgirl at the time – and if I remember, I spoke to Len Wein, who was our editor on the project... [He] said, 'Yeah, okay, cripple the bitch'. It was probably one of the areas where they should've reined me in, but they didn't".

In the introduction to the story as it appears in the trade paperback DC Universe: The Stories of Alan Moore, Brian Bolland disputes the widely held belief that the story started as a Batman annual story and ended up as a prestige-format book. Bolland recalls that the idea for a one-off Batman story focusing on the Joker—with Batman more of an incidental character—was his. Bolland says that in 1984, Dick Giordano told him he could do any project for DC he wanted, and Bolland requested to do a Batman/Joker prestige book with Moore as writer. Bolland has also expressed dissatisfaction with the final book, and regrets that its impending schedule for release meant he could not color the book himself (John Higgins was the colorist). Bolland says that "the end result wasn't quite what I'd hoped. I don't think it rates with some of the highlights of Alan's career". March 2008 saw the release of the artwork as Bolland intended it: the twentieth anniversary hardcover edition of The Killing Joke is completely recolored by Bolland himself. The book made The New York Times Best Seller list in May 2009.

=== Influence on other Joker stories ===
Critic Mark Vogler wrote that The Killing Joke provided the Joker "with a sympathetic back story as it presented some of the villain's most vile offenses". Moore's rendition of the Joker's origin employs elements of the 1951 story "The Man Behind the Red Hood" (Detective Comics #168), which established the concept of the Joker originally having been a thief known only as the Red Hood. According to Will Brooker, in his 2001 book Batman Unmasked: Analyzing a Cultural Icon, the tragic and human elements of the character's story, coupled with his barbaric crimes as the Joker, reveal the character as more of a three-dimensional human being. During an interview with Salon, Moore explained that the Joker's psychotic nature could have been caused by a "bad decision" in his life.

Much of the Joker's backstory from The Killing Joke is also referred to in 2004's "Pushback" (Batman: Gotham Knights #50-55; reprinted with #66 as Batman: Hush Returns), in which the events are observed and reported by the Riddler, who recounts that the pregnant wife of the pre-accident Joker, who is called "Jack" prior to his accident, was kidnapped and murdered by the criminals in order to force his compliance.

=== Feminist interpretations ===
The book has been the subject of feminist critique, criticizing the treatment of Barbara Gordon. Author Brian Cronin notes that "many readers felt the violence towards Barbara Gordon was too much, and even Moore, in retrospect, has expressed his displeasure with how the story turned out". Author Sharon Packer wrote: "Anyone who feels that feminist critics overreacted to Gordon's accident is advised to consult the source material ... Moore's The Killing Joke is sadistic to the core. It shows Gordon stripped and mutilated, with before, during and after photos of the attack displayed before her bound and gagged father, the police commissioner. She is more than merely disabled". Gail Simone included the character's paralysis in a list of "major female characters that had been killed, mutilated, and depowered", dubbing the phenomenon "Women in Refrigerators" in reference to a 1994 Green Lantern story where the title character discovers his girlfriend's mutilated body in his refrigerator. Author Jeffrey A. Brown noted The Killing Joke as an example of the "relatively unequal violence female characters are subjected to" in the major DC/Marvel Comics industry. While male characters may be critically injured or killed, they are more than likely to be returned to their original conception, while "women on the other hand, are more likely to be casually, but irreparably, wounded such as when Barbara Gordon's (the original Batgirl) spine was shattered by the Joker just for fun and has been restricted to a wheelchair for over a decade now".

== Collected editions ==
Title	Material collected	Published date	ISBN
Batman: The Killing Joke	Original graphic novel	1988	0930289455
DC Universe: The Stories of Alan Moore	Batman: The Killing Joke (original colors) and Superman Annual #11, Detective Comics #549-550, Green Lantern #188, Vigilante #17-18, The Omega Men #26-27, DC Comics Presents #85, Tales of the Green Lantern Corps Annual #2-3, Superman #423, Action Comics #583, Secret Origins #10	January 2006	978-1401209278
Batman: The Killing Joke Deluxe Edition	Batman: The Killing Joke (new colors) and material from Batman: Black and White #4	2008	5012256263
Batman Noir: The Killing Joke	Batman: The Killing Joke (no colors) and material from Batman: Black and White #4	August 2016	978-1401263645
Absolute Batman: The Killing Joke	Batman: The Killing Joke (original and new colors) and material from Batman: Black and White #4, Countdown #31, Who's Who in the DC Universe #13	September 2018	978-1401284121
Batman: The Killing Joke Deluxe Edition (Black Label Edition)	Batman: The Killing Joke (new colors) and material from Batman: Black and White #4, Countdown #31, Who's Who in the DC Universe #13	September 2019	978-1401294052

=== Coloring ===
The entire story was recolored by Brian Bolland for the 2008 Deluxe Edition. The new colors featured black-and-white flashbacks, as opposed to Higgins' colors, along with one or two items per panel colored in pink or red, up until the helmet of the Red Hood is revealed. In addition to recoloring the pages, Bolland also removed the yellow oval around the bat symbol on Batman's chest. The blue parts of Batman's costume are changed to black, which doesn't fit with the way the character looked at the time of publication. A colored version of Bolland's "An Innocent Guy" was also included.

John Higgins' original coloring was used in DC Universe: The Stories of Alan Moore, which is now out of print. A printing of the story with Higgins' original colors on gray matte newsprint paper is also available in Absolute Batman: The Killing Joke. In 2023 DC made the Higgins colors available again through the One Bad Day box set, and again in the DC Finest release The Killing Joke and Other Stories. Additionally, the 2026 facsimile reprint of the issue uses the original Higgins coloring. There is still no official digital edition available with Higgins' original coloring.
