= Atomic Skull =

Fictional characters in DC Comics

- The Albert Michaels incarnation of Atomic Skull as depicted in Who's Who in the DC Universe #1 (March 1985). Art by Curt Swan.

Publication information
- Publisher: DC Comics
- First appearance: (Albert Michaels); Superman #303 (September 1976) (Michaels as the Atomic Skull); Superman #323 (May 1978) (Joseph Martin); The Adventures of Superman #483 (October 1991) (Martin as the Atomic Skull); Action Comics #670 (October 1991)
- Created by: (Albert Michaels); Gerry Conway; Curt Swan (Joseph Martin); Roger Stern; Bob McLeod

In-story information
- Alter ego: Albert Michaels; Joseph Martin
- Species: Metahuman
- Team affiliations: (Albert Michaels); SKULL; S.T.A.R. Labs; Secret Society of Super Villains; Injustice League (Joseph Martin); Secret Society of Super Villains
- Notable aliases: (Joseph Martin); Skull
- Abilities: (Both): Superhuman strength, stamina, and durability; Atomic blasts; (Albert Michaels): Resurrection; Genius-level intellect; (Joseph Martin): Power augmentation

The Atomic Skull is a supervillain appearing in American comic books published by DC Comics, commonly as an enemy of Superman. The character first appeared in 1978.

The first Atomic Skull is S.T.A.R. Labs scientist administrator Albert Michaels who used a radium-powered device designed to harness his neural disorder.

The second Atomic Skull is a student named Joseph Martin who gained his powers when the Dominators detonated a gene bomb.

== Publication history ==
The Albert Michaels version of the Atomic Skull first appeared in Superman #323 (May 1978), and was created by Martin Pasko and Curt Swan.

The Joseph Martin version of the Atomic Skull first appeared in The Adventures of Superman #483, and was created by Roger Stern and Bob McLeod.

== Fictional character biography ==
=== Albert Michaels ===
Albert Michaels is a brilliant, but unfriendly scientist-administrator at S.T.A.R. Labs with a rare nervous system disorder that short-circuits the electrical impulses in his brain, giving him painful and uncontrollable seizures. After failing to find a cure, Michaels secretly contacts the criminal organization SKULL, who give him a radium-powered device designed to harness his neural disorder into deadly atomic "brain-blasts" in exchange for him becoming their agent. However, these mental blasts are difficult to control and only worsen Michaels' condition, a situation that he blamed on Superman after the Man of Steel captured the scientists who could have cured him. Swearing revenge, Michaels dons a distinctive yellow and green costume, dubs himself the Atomic Skull, and eventually becomes the leader of SKULL. He utilizes a sleek skull-shaped hovercraft and is assisted by his lover Felicia, an artificially evolved panther.

Following Crisis on Infinite Earths, Michaels made one appearance, battling Thunder and Lightning in Teen Titans Spotlight. It is assumed that his background has not changed, although instead of being diagnosed with a nervous disorder, it was said that his powers came because he sought immortality and mutated himself.

Michaels returned in 2007 in Birds of Prey. He also appeared in the miniseries Villains United during the "Infinite Crisis" storyline, where he joined Alexander Luthor Jr.'s Secret Society of Super Villains.

In 2011, The New 52 rebooted the DC universe. Albert Michaels is re-introduced in Action Comics Annual #1, written by Max Landis. When a S.T.A.R. Labs submarine crashes underwater, one of its scientists is exposed to experimental radiation. He is washed to shore, with memories of the life he had, and the woman he loved and lost. Alone on a desert island, he fights to survive, eating the local, tropical vegetation. When a leopard finds and attacks him, he unexpectedly emits a blast of radiation that vaporizes its body. Eventually, he learns to use this power to his benefit, killing animals for food, and blasting away holes in the rock faces for shelter. The radiation soon takes its toll on him, as he remembers how he had caught his wife flirting with someone at a dance club and murdered her in a jealous rage. In anger, he destroys most of the island. His face melts away, revealing his radioactive skull.

After a fight with Superman, Michaels was given a job at the Metropolis Police Department. He assists Superman in apprehending Shockwave.

In 2016, DC Comics implemented a relaunch of its books called "DC Rebirth", which restored its continuity to a form much as it was prior to The New 52. Atomic Skull is seen imprisoned in Kamen Maximum Security Prison.

The Atomic Skull is shown trying to make amends by being the warden at Stryker's Island. He battles Hector Hammond when Hal Jordan attempts to free him from prison. Hammond renders Atomic Skull temporarily brain dead using his psychic powers, but Jordan convinces him to let Atomic Skull live.

=== Joseph Martin ===
Student Joseph Martin is at S.T.A.R. Labs for a routine check-up when the site is struck by an intense blast of energy from the Dominators' gene-bomb, giving him superhuman strength and causing his flesh to become invisible. Later attacked by some thugs, the resulting brain damage causes Martin to become insane and assume the guise of "the Atomic Skull", a hero from an old movie serial that he loved. He also emits dangerous amounts of radiation, later gaining the ability to project it as energy blasts. He has plagued Superman, whom he believed to be the serial's villain Doctor Electron (particularly when Superman acquired electricity-based powers), and Lois Lane, whom he saw as the Skull's love interest, Zelda Wentworth.

During the "Underworld Unleashed" storyline, Atomic Skull is given enhanced powers by the demon Neron in exchange for his soul. Cured of his delusions, he at first intends to follow the character's example for real as a superhero, but has since appeared as a more conventional supervillain.

== Powers and abilities ==
Albert Michaels can deliver powerful energy bolts through the visor of his mask. These blasts have been described as unique brainwaves, heat vision, and radioactive energy throughout the years. Aside from his energy attacks, Michaels is an experienced leader of the SKULL organization and a expert scientist.

Joseph Martin has immense strength, stamina, and durability, comparable to that of Superboy (Kon-El), Superman, and Lar Gand. He can also project blasts of purple atomic energy from his hands or mouth.

== Other versions ==
=== Flashpoint ===
An alternate universe version of Joseph Martin / Atomic Skull appears in Flashpoint as an inmate of the Doom prison.

=== Superman: Red Son ===
An unidentified alternate universe version of Red Skull appears in Superman: Red Son #3. This version was created by Lex Luthor in an unsuccessful attempt to kill Superman.

== In other media ==
=== Television ===
- Albert Michaels makes a non-speaking appearance in the Superman episode "Fugitive from Space".
- The Joseph Martin incarnation of the Atomic Skull appears in Justice League Unlimited, voiced by Lex Lang. This version is a member of Gorilla Grodd's Secret Society.
- The Albert Michaels incarnation of the Atomic Skull makes a non-speaking appearance in the Young Justice episode "Revelation" as a member of the Injustice League.
- The Albert Michaels incarnation of the Atomic Skull appears in the opening credits of Powerless.
- A hologram of an unidentified Atomic Skull appears in Superman & Lois.
- The Joseph Martin incarnation of Atomic Skull appears in My Adventures with Superman, voiced by Max Mittelman. This version is an agent of Task Force X whose abilities are derived from Kryptonian armor.

=== Film ===
- The Joseph Martin incarnation of the Atomic Skull appears in Superman vs. The Elite, voiced by Dee Bradley Baker. Following a fight with Superman, he is incarcerated at and forced to power Stryker's Island until he escapes by overloading the generator. Eventually, he is confronted and defeated by Superman and the Elite before the group's leader Manchester Black kills him at the behest of a boy whose father the Atomic Skull killed.
- An unidentified Atomic Skull makes a cameo appearance in Justice League vs. Teen Titans, voiced by an uncredited Rick D. Wasserman.

=== Video games ===
The Joseph Martin incarnation of the Atomic Skull appears as a character summon in Scribblenauts Unmasked: A DC Comics Adventure.

=== Miscellaneous ===
The Albert Michaels incarnation of the Atomic Skull appears in a special one-shot for the Young Justice tie-in comic book published for Free Comic Book Day.
