= Thomas Curry =

Tom, Tommy, or Thomas Curry may refer to:

- Tom Curry (footballer) (1894–1958), English footballer
- Tom Curry (rugby union) (born 1998), English rugby union player
- Tom Curry (writer) (1900–1976), American pulp fiction writer
- Thomas J. Curry (born 1957), Comptroller of the Currency of the United States
- Thomas John Curry (born 1943), bishop of the Roman Catholic Church
- Tommy J. Curry, professor at the University of Edinburgh
- Thomas Curry (comics) a character in DC Comics who is the father of Aquaman

== See also ==
- Thomas Currie (disambiguation)
- Tim Curry (disambiguation)
