= Truth, Justice, and the American Way =

Truth, Justice, and the American Way may refer to:

- Truth, Justice, and the American Way, a catch-phrase of the superhero Superman.
- What's So Funny About Truth, Justice & the American Way?, a comic book published by DC Comics in 2001
- Truth, Justice, and the American Way, the original title of the 2006 feature film Hollywoodland
- "Truth, Justice and the American Way" (Supergirl), an episode of the TV series Supergirl (2016)
- "What's So Funny About Truth, Justice, and the American Way?", an episode of the TV series Supergirl (2019)
