= What's So Funny About Truth, Justice & the American Way? =

2001 DC Comics story

- Cover of Action Comics #775 (March 2001) by Tim Bradstreet.
- Publisher: DC Comics
- Publication date: March 2001
- Genre: Superhero
- Title(s): Action Comics #775
- Main characters: Superman; The Elite

Creative team
- Writer: Joe Kelly
- Pencillers: Doug Mahnke; Lee Bermejo
- Inkers: Tom Nguyen; Dexter Vines; Jim Royal; Jose Marzan; Wade Von Grawbadger; Wayne Faucher
- Letterer: Comicraft
- Colorist: Rob Schwager
- Editors: Eddie Berganza; Tom Palmer Jr.
- Superman: The Greatest Stories Ever Told, Volume 1: ISBN 1-4012-0339-6

"What's So Funny About Truth, Justice & the American Way?" is a story that appeared in Action Comics #775 as published by DC Comics in March 2001. Written by Joe Kelly, pencilled by Doug Mahnke and Lee Bermejo, and inked by Tom Nguyen, Dexter Vines, Jim Royal, Jose Marzan, Wade Von Grawbadger and Wayne Faucher. The comic features a moral struggle between Superman and the values of a newer, more violent team of heroes called The Elite. The clash mirrored a real-life debate among the comics community in light of the success of comics such as The Authority, which featured explicit sex and violence. This issue was well-received by critics and has been reprinted several times.

== Plot summary ==
The Elite, a team of super-powered vigilantes, gain worldwide popularity for confronting terrorists and other criminals using methods that are characterized by mass destruction and violent, summary execution. They are led by a powerful British telekinetic named Manchester Black, and include Coldcast, who can emit tremendous amounts of energy; Menagerie, who is symbiotically bonded with many demonic-looking beasts called symbeasts; and the Hat, a magician whose abilities are centered upon his fedora. Despite the 32% approval that the Elite garner from the public, Superman condemns their unlawful killing of criminals.

After Superman neutralizes a group of alien invaders called the Klee-Tee, the Elite appear. When Manchester orders The Hat to kill the Klee-Tee, Superman assaults The Hat to prevent him from doing this, leading to an altercation with The Elite. During their next confrontation, which occurs in the middle of a city, Superman implores the group to move their imminent duel elsewhere, and the Elite obliges by transporting themselves and Superman to the Jovian moon Io, along with a group of hovering camera drones that transmit the ensuing battle back to Earth. Superman then endures a vicious beating at the hands of the Elite, one that appears to annihilate him.

However, one by one, the members of the Elite are subsequently attacked by an unseen Superman, and apparently killed by him. Superman uses his X-ray and heat vision to remove the mutated portion of Manchester's brain that gave him his telekinetic abilities, neutralizing him. As a terrified Manchester breaks down over his impending demise, Superman reveals that the Elite are all alive and awaiting arrest, and that the "lobotomy" he gave Manchester was the equivalent of a concussion and is not permanent. Superman explains that he created the illusion that he had crossed the line into brutal vigilantism to illustrate the danger and pointlessness of hatred and vengeance to the public. An enraged Manchester threatens retribution, telling Superman that he is living in a dream. Superman responds that dreams are what motivate people to transform themselves, and vows that he will never stop fighting until his dream of a world of dignity, honor and justice becomes a reality.

== Collected editions ==
The story was originally republished in a number of trade paperbacks:

- Justice League Elite, Volume 1 (collects: Action Comics #775, JLA #100, JLA Secret Files 2004, and Justice League Elite #1–4, 208 pages, 2005, Titan ISBN 1-84576-191-X, DC ISBN 1-4012-0481-3)
- Superman: The Greatest Stories Ever Told, Volume 1 (includes Action Comics #775, 192 pages, Titan, 2006 ISBN 1-84576-399-8 DC, 2004 ISBN 1-4012-0339-6)

== Reception ==
The issue was #47 in the Diamond Comic Distributors sales list, with an estimated sales figure of 37,076.

The issue was called "the single best issue of a comic book written in the year 2001", was voted the #1 in the Top Ten Comics of the Decade, #21 in the list of "Top 100 Comics of the last 30 years" and named the "Greatest Superman Story of All Time" by Wizard Magazine. It was also placed at #4 in the "Top 10 Overrated Comic Books" by Comics Bulletin.

== In other media ==
- The story was adapted into the 2012 DC Animated film, Superman vs. The Elite.
- The season four episode of Supergirl is titled "What's So Funny About Truth, Justice & the American Way?". This episode is not an exact adaptation of the comic book storyline but is the first episode of the titular character dealing with The Elite.
