= Tim Curran =

Tim Curran may refer to:

- Tim Curran (Australian rules footballer), former Australian rules footballer
- Tim Curran (rugby union) (born 1984), Australian rugby union footballer
- Timmy Curran, surfer
- Tim Curran, a fictional character on the TV Series Terra Nova
- Tim Curran, former political editor of Roll Call
- Tim Curran, plaintiff in Curran v. Mount Diablo Council of the Boy Scouts of America

== See also ==
- Tim Curry (disambiguation)
