= Superman vs. The Elite =

2012 film directed by Michael Chang

- Blu-ray cover
- Directed by: Michael Chang
- Written by: Joe Kelly
- Based on: What's So Funny About Truth, Justice & the American Way? by Joe Kelly
- Starring: George Newbern; Pauley Perrette; Robin Atkin Downes; Catero Colbert; Melissa Disney; Andrew Kishino
- Edited by: Christopher D. Lozinski
- Music by: Robert J. Kral
- Production companies: Warner Premiere; DC Entertainment; Warner Bros. Animation
- Distributed by: Warner Home Video
- Release date: June 12, 2012
- Running time: 76 minutes
- Country: United States
- Language: English

Superman vs. The Elite is a 2012 American animated superhero film based on the comic book story "What's So Funny About Truth, Justice & the American Way?" in Action Comics #775 (March 2001). It was adapted to film by Joe Kelly, who also wrote the comic book story and it was directed by Michael Chang. The film featured the return of George Newbern as Superman and David Kaufman as Jimmy Olsen reprising their roles from the DC Animated Universe. Released on June 12, 2012, it is the 14th film of the DC Universe Animated Original Movies.

== Plot ==
The supervillain Atomic Skull attacks Metropolis, killing several people before Superman arrives and defeats him. When questioned at the United Nations about the property damage and lives lost in the fight and why he doesn't try to "fix the world" with his power, Superman delivers a speech which emphasizes both the folly of lawless violence and the greater good that is found within everyone. His speech is interrupted by the leaders of Bialya and Pokolistan, who, blaming each other for the violation of a peace treaty, declare war on each other. Arriving in Bialya, Superman witnesses the deployment of a Pokolistani bio-weapon which attacks and destroys most of the Bialyan military forces.

As Superman tries to remove the Bialyan soldiers from danger, a team of super-powered vigilantes known as The Elite arrive and aid him in destroying the bio-weapon. The Elite consist of Manchester Black, a British telepath and telekinetic; Coldcast, a black man who can emit tremendous amounts of electrical energy; Menagerie, a Puerto Rican woman who is symbiotically bonded with a number of demonic-looking beasts; and Hat, an Asian magician whose abilities are centered upon his fedora.

Superman returns to Metropolis to report the news and further investigate the Elite. The Elite and Superman rescue civilians on a subway train trapped underwater due to a terrorist attack. The terrorists are nearly killed by Manchester's attempt at interrogation, and Superman begins to be concerned about the motives of his newfound friends. Manchester, the group's leader, broadcasts a message to the planet, announcing that the Elite intends to deal with villains lethally. After the broadcast, Superman travels to Bialya, where Coldcast inadvertently hits him with a neutrino pulse. Superman is saved by the other members of the Elite and teleported to their base of operations - a sentient macro-organism named Bunny. Superman's attempt to convince the Elite that killing is unnecessary falls upon deaf ears, and he is unceremoniously teleported back to Earth.

Atomic Skull breaks out of prison and is challenged by The Elite with little success. Superman arrives and begins to coordinate an attack with the Elite that allows them to emerge victorious, but Atomic Skull is executed by Manchester. The Elite inform Superman that, in the interests of peace, they have also killed both the Pokolistani and Bialyan leaders, and regard Superman's adverse reaction as a declaration of war.

Superman informs the Elite that he is willing to fight them, but away from the civilian populace. Black teleports both parties to the Moon, and broadcasts the fight worldwide. While Superman is able to withstand and counter the attacks of Coldcast, Menagerie and Hat, he is brought to his knees by Manchester's telekinetic attack. Coldcast unleashes a massive blast of electromagnetic energy, seemingly obliterating Superman. Moments later, the disconcerted voice of Superman begins to taunt the Elite, stating that he has finally been convinced that he needs to start killing villains - beginning with the Elite.

Reappearing in a blur of movement, Superman begins to take out the Elite one by one; first, he injects Menagerie with a poison before suffocating the Hat with a high-speed whirlwind. Against Coldcast's wishes, Manchester teleports them to Metropolis, hoping to use the innocent civilians as cover before Superman seemingly throws Coldcast into orbit. Reappearing before an increasingly desperate Manchester, Superman is once again attacked, but the assault fails to harm him. He uses his heat vision to "lobotomize" Manchester, stripping him of his powers.

Believing his death to be seconds away, Manchester tells Superman that the world knows he is no better than they are and thus unable to be trusted. However, Superman reveals that the Elite were not killed but transported to the Fortress of Solitude and stripped of their power. The people of Earth realize that violence and killing were incompatible with the tenets of justice, and accept that Superman's methods are in the best interests of humanity.

== Voice cast ==
- George Newbern as Kal-El / Clark Kent / Superman
- Pauley Perrette as Lois Lane
- Robin Atkin Downes as Manchester Black
  - Grey DeLisle as young Manchester Black
- Catero Colbert as Nathan Jones / Coldcast
- Melissa Disney as Pamela "Pam" / Menagerie
- Andrew Kishino as The Hat
- Dee Bradley Baker as Joseph Martin / Atomic Skull
- Ogie Banks as Terrence Baxter
- Paul Eiding as Pa Kent
- Troy Evans as Pundit
- Jennifer Hale as Kid Playing Superman
- David Kaufman as Jimmy Olsen
- Pamela Kosh as Abigail
- Jeff LaPensee as Falling Man
- Marcella Lentz-Pope as Vera Black
  - Tara Strong as young Vera Black
- Dave B. Mitchell as Shocktrooper
- Sumalee Montano as Newscaster
- Laraine Newman as Newscaster #3
- Nolan North as Pokolistani Ambassador
- Henry Simmons as Efrain Baxter
- Stephen Stanton as Bialyan Ambassador, Cartoon Superman, Manchester Black's Father
- Fred Tatasciore as Perry White
- Bruce Timm as MI-5 Agent
- Julie Wittner as Cowering Woman
- Rick Zieff as Desiccated Man

== Production ==
The film was first announced at San Diego Comic-Con 2011, during the screening of Batman: Year One, as one of the films from the DC Universe Animated Original Movies line for 2012, by producer Bruce Timm. Joe Kelly, writer of Action Comics #775, "What's So Funny About Truth, Justice & the American Way?", adapted his own work into the film. He was quoted as saying, "The story tackles themes that go way beyond a typical superhero story...politics, the price of power and America's place as a force in the world are all viewed through the lens of the DC Universe. Even if fans aren't paying close attention to these issues, they're all over the media. You can't escape them. So with the state of affairs being what it is, I can't think of a better time to see Superman confront these themes...I'm a big fan of taking real world issues and working them out through our "superhero" stories—but this one goes beyond strict allegory. Like the original comic story, the film is thought provoking without being preachy and really delivers a punch." He also said that, in terms of expanding the comic book issue into an animated film, and the differences between the two, that he "Alan [Burnett] helped me cut to the heart of the story and personalize it for an audience who might not have known the original comic...the original story was about anti-heroes and comic fans and trends in the industry that were disturbing to me when it was written. For the story to work as a film, we needed to get beyond that while keeping the core of the story: that Superman serves a purpose and his moral code is relevant even in the modern world. This is where the expansion into "world politics" really helped."

== Theme music ==
Superman vs. the Elite utilizes the same musical main theme that was composed by Robert Kral for Superman: Doomsday (2007).

== Reception ==
On Rotten Tomatoes, the film has an 80% score based on five reviews, with an average rating of 7.2/10.

Superman vs. the Elite earned $1,815,269 from domestic DVD sales and $1,394,884 from domestic Blu-ray sales, bringing its total domestic earnings to $3,210,153.

== Home media ==
Superman vs. The Elite was released on DVD and Blu-ray with a combo pack. Features include: a sneak peek at Part 1 of the animated film version of The Dark Knight Returns, two featurettes "The Elite Unbound: No Rules, No Mercy" and "Superman and the Moral Debate", audio commentary, two episodes of Superman: The Animated Series, and Action Comics #775 as a digital comic. The combo pack was released on June 12, 2012.

It is the final film by Warner Premiere, as Warner Home Video shut the company down two months later. Though, titles still continued to be released under the Warner Premiere label until 2013.

== See also ==
- What's So Funny About Truth, Justice & the American Way?
