= Tim Curry (disambiguation) =

Tim Curry (1946–2026), was an English actor and singer.

Tim Curry may also refer to:

- Tim Curry (attorney) (1938–2009), American attorney
- Tim Curry (guitarist), former member of The Crüxshadows

== See also ==
- Tim Curran (disambiguation)
- Tom Curry (disambiguation)
