= List of DC Comics characters: M =

== Josephine MacDonald ==
Josephine MacDonald, also known as Josie Mac, is a police officer who had a promising career ahead of her, until she responded to a call and discovered the mayor's wife in bed with an exotic dancer. Four days after the incident, her mistake of embarrassing the mayor's wife got her moved to the Missing Persons department at the precinct. Josie made the best out of her transfer because, unknown to her colleagues, she possessed minor psychic powers, which allowed her to find things and people that are lost through picking up "messages" from inanimate objects.

=== Josie Mac in other media ===
Josie Mac appears in Gotham, portrayed by Paulina Singer. This version is a member of the GCPD's Strike Force.

== Isla MacPherson ==
Isla MacPherson is a history teacher at Gotham Academy. The character–created by Brendan Fletcher, Becky Cloonan, and Karl Kerschl–first appeared in Gotham Academy #1 (December 2014).

=== Isla MacPherson in other media ===
Aisla MacPherson appears in Creature Commandos, voiced by Stephanie Beatriz. This version was a tenured professor and leading expert in Themysciran history before she is killed by Clayface.

== Heather Macy ==
Heather Macy-Thawne is a character appearing in American comic books published by DC Comics. The character–created by Joshua Williamson and Carmine Di Giandomenico–first appeared in The Flash: Rebirth vol. 2 #1 (August 2016). She is an ancestor of Eobard Thawne (aka Professor Zoom and Reverse-Flash).

== Mad Bomber ==
Mad Bomber (Bertram Smith) is a greedy, mentally unstable man who was killed by an airplane as it came down a runway while he attempted to escape Batman and Robin.

=== Mad Bomber in other media ===
An original incarnation, Ted Dymer, appears in the Batman: The Animated Series episode "Beware the Gray Ghost", voiced by Bruce Timm. This version is a toy store collector who became a supervillain to make money by threatening Gotham City in order to buy more toys.

== Madame Zodiac ==
Madame Zodiac is first introduced as a "crime broker" for Poison Ivy and Catwoman. Zodiac promises both the criminals that they will come into conflict with the Earth-Two Huntress (Helena Wayne), Batwoman (Kathy Kane), and Batgirl (Barbara Gordon), while in the commission of their crimes, but they would succeed. At the end of the story Poison Ivy and Catwoman are defeated but Zodiac evades capture after stealing a powerful mystical artifact.

An entity whom Madame Zodiac refers to as the "Adored One" possesses Batman's body, with magical duplicates of Batman being created for when the Adored One burns out his body. The possessed Batman briefly spars with Superman before being freed from the Adored One's control. Madame Zodiac is subdued by Superman, and Doctor Zodiac tells him about the mysterious prisoner. Superman shatters the walls of the cell, revealing the real Madame Zodiac chained to a wall. The Madame Zodiac who Doctor Zodiac had fallen in love with was a magical clone created by the Adored One. Madame Zodiac, Doctor Zodiac, and Superman confront the duplicate and the Adored One. Madame Zodiac is apparently killed by her evil duplicate, and both her duplicate and Doctor Zodiac are killed by the Adored One. Batman uses the Zodiac Idol to destroy the Adored One's containment sphere, dispersing it.

== Major Victory ==
Major Victory is the code-name of four characters in DC Comics.

=== William Vickers ===
William "Bill" Vickers is a member of the Force of July, a government-sponsored superhero team. He first appeared in Batman and the Outsiders Annual #1 (September 1984). He is later killed while fighting the forces of Eclipso.

Major Victory is shown to be alive in the Infinite Frontier continuity, where he is recruited by the Penguin, but he is soon killed in battle.

=== Second version ===
A second version of Major Victory is a victim of the Hollow Men, but is eventually saved by Superman. Major Victory may have died via decapitation.

=== Third version ===
In Crisis Aftermath: The Battle for Blüdhaven #1 (June 2006), a third version of Major Victory appears as a member of Freedom's Ring which are employed by the government to defend Blüdhaven from metahuman forces. Major Victory is later killed by Major Force.

=== Fourth version ===
A fourth version of Major Victory, a member of S.H.A.D.E.'s First Strike team, is introduced in Uncle Sam and the Freedom Fighters (vol. 1) #7 (March 2007).

== Mala ==
Mala, along with his brothers Kizo and U-Ban, is a native of the planet Krypton, and a former member of the science council. Some years before Krypton exploded, the trio attempted to take over the planet by threatening to remove all moisture from the atmosphere with one of their inventions. They were stopped by Superman's father Jor-El who placed them in suspended animation and sent them into outer space as an alternative to the death penalty. Mala and his brothers manage to escape on two occasions, but are returned to suspended animation each time.

=== Mala in other media ===
A female incarnation of Mala appears in Superman: The Animated Series, voiced by Leslie Easterbrook in the second season and Sarah Douglas in the third season. This version is a trusted lieutenant and partner of Jax-Ur who participated in the latter's attempt to take over Krypton years prior until Jor-El foiled their plot and imprisoned them in the Phantom Zone. After being freed, she battles Superman on two occasions before being killed by a black hole.

== Sebastien Mallory ==
Sebastien Mallory is a junior executive at LexCorp. He and Jimmy Olsen constantly clash with each other.

=== Sebastien Mallory in other media ===
Sebastien Mallory appears in the Superman & Lois episode "A World Without", portrayed by Jason Cermack.

== Matches Malone ==
- First appearance: Batman #242 (June 1972)
- Created by: Dennis O'Neil, Irv Novick, Dick Giordano
- Further reading: Matches Malone at the Comic Book DB (archived from the original); Matches Malone at the Grand Comics Database

Matches Malone is a character appearing in American comic books published by DC Comics. The character, created by Dennis O'Neil and Irv Novick, first appeared in Batman #242 (June 1972). He was originally a gang boss whom Batman attempted to recruit, but was accidentally killed by a ricocheting bullet that was meant for Batman. As a result, Bruce Wayne impersonated Malone in order to use his underworld contacts and to fool Ra's al Ghul.

Post-Crisis, the real Matches Malone was a small-time arsonist with his brother Carver Malone who came to Gotham City early on in Batman's career, attracting Batman's attention when Carver was apparently murdered. After discovering that Matches had died as well, Batman adopted his identity since no one else knew of his death. Years later, Batman learned that Carver had committed suicide due to his guilt over a fire that he and Matches had started, which resulted in the death of a homeless man. After operating underground for years by committing low-end robberies, Matches returned to Gotham upon hearing reports of his activities, only to be shot by Scarface for his betrayal, surviving long enough to confess his role in the aforementioned events to Batman and Nightwing. His last request was that Batman bury him next to his brother and avenge his death. Batman subsequently destroyed Scarface in 'revenge' for Malone's death.

=== Matches Malone in other media ===
- Matches Malone appears in Batman: The Animated Series and The New Batman Adventures as a disguise utilized by Batman.
- Matthew "Matches" Malone appears in Batman: The Brave and the Bold as a disguise utilized by Batman.
- Patrick "Matches" Malone appears in Gotham, portrayed by Danny Schoch in his first appearance and by Michael Bowen in his second appearance. This version is a hitman-for-hire and the killer of Thomas and Martha Wayne.
- Matches Malone appears in the Young Justice episode "Elder Wisdom" as a disguise utilized by Batman.
- Jimmy Malone appears in Tom Mankiewicz's aborted script for The Batman. This version would have been a criminal accomplice to the Joker.
- Matches Malone appears in The Batman Adventures. This version is a low-level enforcer for Rupert Thorne before being killed by Chicago gangsters Dapper and Cricket.
- Irving "Matches" Malone appears in Batman: Arkham Shadow as a disguise utilized by Batman. This version earned his nickname "Matches" from setting the Bat-Signal alight in order to get himself incarcerated at Blackgate and learn more about the Rat King's plans. By the end of the game, Malone is believed by the general public to be the Rat King. After Batman retires the identity, Malone is presumed dead by the authorities and the public at large.

== Moxie Mannheim ==
Moxie Mannheim is the founder of Intergang and the father of Bruno Mannheim. He was killed by his rivals.

In post-Crisis continuity, Mannheim had been in prison since the 1940s after being captured by Guardian and the Newsboy Legion. After being released from prison, he briefly worked with his old ally Granny Goodness. After surviving a fall into a chasm, he works with Dabney Donovan to revive his henchmen Mike Gunn, Ginny McCree, Noose, and Rough House in youthful, superpowered bodies and transfer himself into a youthful body.

In Infinite Crisis, Mannheim appears as a member of Alexander Luthor Jr.'s Secret Society of Super Villains until he is killed by Superboy-Prime. Mannheim was resurrected following the DC Rebirth relaunch, but is later killed by Red Cloud.

While Moxie does not have superpowers, he was shown to be a skilled marksman and an expert at hand-to-hand combat.

=== Moxie Mannheim in other media ===
- Moxie Mannheim appears as a character summon in Scribblenauts Unmasked: A DC Comics Adventure.
- A character based on Moxie Manheim named Antony Moxie appears in the Superman & Lois episode "Forever and Always", portrayed by Artine Brown. This version is the founder of Intergang. After turning down a deal to work with Lex Luthor, the Mannheim family kills Moxie and his loyalists and frames Luthor for the murders.
- Moxie Mannheim appears in Catwoman: Hunted, voiced by Jonathan Frakes. This version is a member of Leviathan who represents Intergang.

== Manticore ==
Manticore is the name of several characters appearing in American comic books published by DC Comics.

=== Anastasio Corvo ===
Anastasia Corvo is a member of Jihad who wears manticore-like armor. He was killed by Deadshot.

=== Second version ===
The second Manticore is an unnamed man who was recruited to join the Jihad in their attack on Manhattan before being killed by Duchess.

=== Third version ===
The third Manticore is an unnamed member of Jihad and Injustice League Unlimited.

=== Fourth version ===
The fourth Manticore is an unnamed Greek member of the Global Guardians with a manticore-like appearance.

=== Fifth version ===
The fifth Manticore is a member of Iran's sanctioned superhero team, the Elite Basij, who possesses a manticore-like appearance.

== Marauder ==
Marauder is the name of several characters appearing in American comic books published by DC Comics.

=== First version ===
The first Marauder is a Viking-themed space pirate from Earth-One, who fought Superman.

=== Second version ===
The second Marauder was created by Robby Reed's Master form the cell sample of an unknown person. He was used by Master to spring Naiad from prison.

=== Curtis Eisenmann ===
Curtis Eisenmann started out as a helicopter in the Gotham City Police Department. After losing some of his skin, left leg, and jaw in a helicopter accident, his mother Birgit saved his life by replacing his parts with cybernetics and equipping him with a powered exoskeleton. This led him to plan revenge on Batman.

=== Hastings ===
Hastings is an operative of the Sunderland Corporation who fought Hawkman.

=== Fifth version ===
The fifth Marauder is an armored criminal resembling Shayera Thal who worked for Metatech and was used to attack Hawkman.

=== Sixth version ===
The sixth Marauder is a cyborg mercenary who fought Aquaman while targeting nuclear warheads in Sub Diego.

During the "Infinite Crisis" storyline, Marauder appears as a member of Alexander Luthor Jr.'s Secret Society of Super Villains.

== March Harriet ==
March Harriet (Harriet Pratt; also called March Hare) is a small-time con artist and part-time escort who operated outside of Gotham City. She was recruited by Tweedledum and Tweedledee to join the Wonderland Gang which included a brainwashed Mad Hatter. Harriet acted as their version of the March Hare.

In 2016, DC Comics implemented a relaunch of its books called "DC Rebirth", which restored its continuity to a form much as it was prior to "The New 52". In this continuity, Harriet Pratt was born in East London before moving to Gotham City and becoming a thief. After being shot by security guards and left for dead, Harriet is nursed back to health by Jervis Tetch and joins his Wonderland Gang.

=== March Harriet in other media ===
- March Harriet appears in The Lego Batman Movie. She is among Batman's villains recruited by the Joker to take part in the attacks on Gotham City.
- March Harriet appears in the DC Comics Novel series adaptation of Mad Love, written by Paul Dini and Pat Cadigan. This version is a patient of Arkham Asylum under Harleen Quinzel's care.

== Clyde Mardon ==
Clyde Mardon is a scientist who discovered a method to control weather, and the brother of Mark Mardon. Once Clyde died of a heart attack, Mark used his research to create a weather-manipulating wand and be the criminal Weather Wizard.

=== Clyde Mardon in other media ===
- Clyde Mardon appears in the Superman: The Animated Series episode "Speed Demons", voiced by Lorin Dreyfuss.
- Clyde Mardon appears in the series premiere of The Flash, portrayed by Chad Rook. This version is a criminal alongside his brother Mark, was caught in a plane crash when S.T.A.R. Labs' particle accelerator exploded, giving them both the metahuman ability to manipulate weather. He was promptly killed by Joe West.

== Hurrambi Marlo ==
Hurrambi Marlo is the president of the fictional Middle Eastern country of Qurac, and was a recurring antagonist in DC Comics during the late Bronze Age, created by Marv Wolfman and Rich Buckler. Originally a military general, he came to a power in a coup that overthrew a pro-Western regime and established a military dictatorship in the country. His regime became notorious for diplomatic controversies, alleged state-sponsorship of terrorism, and usage of WMDs.

After coming to power, Marlo hired Cheshire to kidnap Adeline Kane in order to extract information from her that would help him in his upcoming invasion of neighboring Kyran. Her son, the Teen Titans member Jericho, went to Qurac to rescue her. Cheshire brings Jericho to Marlo, who reveals that he previously hired the Jackal to kill Jericho's father Slade Wilson. Jackal kidnapped Jericho and slit his throat, rendering him mute. After escaping, they confront Marlo as he was buying weapons for the upcoming invasion, but Jericho decides to pacify him. Later, Qurac obtained WMDs, and Marlo embarked on a quest to obtain a powerful substance called Promethium that would help Qurac become the strongest nation on Earth. Crossing lines again, Jericho stopped him in a battle.

Marlo was deposed after a Quraci protest, Superman was sent to send him on trial to the United States. Superman discovers that Marlo was merely a scapegoat for the US government's funding of terrorists in the Middle East after a failed assassination attempt on Marlo's life was ordered by the government.

== Maya ==
Maya (Chandi Gupta) is an Indian superheroine in the DC Universe. She first appeared in Justice League Europe #47 (1993), and was created by Gerard Jones and Ron Randall.

Chandi Gupta is an Indian girl who developed the ability to generate fire and water at a young age. Her parents leave her in the care of a cult which they had become involved with, whose members believe her to be the reincarnation of Shiva. Chandi flees to London after realizing that the cult intends to offer her as a human sacrifice.

While in London, Chandi assumes the codename Maya and helps the Justice League Europe defeat Sonar. She is offered membership in the Justice League and accepts, having nowhere else to go.

Maya later learns that the cult who adopted her is affiliated with the Overmaster, who plans to destroy Earth. Overmaster takes control of Maya's mind and uses her against her teammates. Mahayogi, whom she had fought earlier with the League, sacrifices himself to free her. After confronting the Overmaster, Justice League Europe disbands. Maya reunites with her parents, who are revealed to possess fire-based powers similar to hers.

=== Powers and abilities ===
Maya was originally only able to manifest a mystical bow, which is capable of firing projectiles made of mystical fire or water. She later developed the ability to manifest fire and water without using the bow as a focus.

=== Maya in other media ===
Chandi Gupta makes a non-speaking appearance in the My Adventures with Superman episode "Most Eligible Superman".

== Mayflower ==
Mayflower is a member of the Force of July, a government-sponsored superhero team. She first appeared in Batman and the Outsiders Annual #1 (September 1984). She is later killed by Ravan of the Suicide Squad during the Janus Directive event.

Mayflower is shown to be alive in the Infinite Frontier continuity, where she is recruited by the Penguin, but she is soon killed in battle.

== Nina Mazursky ==
Nina Mazursky is a character who was originally created for the Flashpoint tie-in series Frankenstein and the Creatures of the Unknown #1 (2011). She was created by Jeff Lemire and Ibraim Roberson. The mainstream version first appeared in Frankenstein: Agent of Shade and was created by Lemire and Alberto Ponticelli.

=== Flashpoint version ===
In the Flashpoint continuity, Nina is a fish-like humanoid from Romania who was adopted by scientist Myron Mazursky while he was working there. He made her believe that she was his biological daughter and was born a human until she was mutated to treat a lung disease. When Myron establishes the Creature Commandos, Nina becomes one of the group's founding members.

=== Mainstream version ===
In 2011, "The New 52" rebooted the DC universe and introduced a mainstream comics version of Nina Mazursky. Nina is a scientist working for S.H.A.D.E. who becomes a piscine mutant after extensive self-experimentation and joins the Creature Commandos to make use of her new abilities. Khalis, a mummy and fellow member of the Creature Commandos, gives Nina the ability to survive on land.

=== Nina Mazursky in other media ===
Nina Mazursky appears in Creature Commandos, voiced by Zoë Chao. This version is a member of the eponymous group from Star City who was born with her lungs outside of her body. Her scientist father Edward used genetic engineering in an attempt to heal her condition, only to inadvertently turn her into a piscine mutant who cannot breathe outside water without special equipment. After being bullied by her classmates, she runs away and lives in the waterways. Nina was eventually captured and arrested because of her appearance, resulting in Edward being shot by a police officer while intervening on her behalf. In the present, Nina is recruited into the Creature Commandos. During the group's mission in Pokolistan, Nina is killed by Ilana Rostovic, who she was tasked with killing.

== Professor Mazursky ==
Professor Mazursky is the name of two characters in DC Comics.

=== First version ===
The first Professor Mazursky (first name unknown) is a biochemist and a member of Project M during World War II. Mazursky helped convert soldiers Warren Griffith, Elliot Taylor, and Vincent Velcro into monstrous forms, with the three becoming founding members of the members of the Creature Commandos.

=== Myron Mazursky ===
Myron Mazursky is the Flashpoint version of Professor Mazursky who first appeared in Flashpoint: Frankenstein and the Creatures of the Unknown #1 (August 2011), and was created by Jeff Lemire and Ibraim Roberson.

Myron is the founder of the Creature Commandos, having been inspired by a village of monsters he encountered during a trip to Romania. While in the village, Myron adopted an amphibious girl named Nina. Years later, after the Creature Commandos were decommissioned following World War II, Myron returned to the village and laid low there. In 2011, the awakened Creature Commandos found Myron in the monster village. When he invited his creations to join him, only Nina and Warren Griffith accepted.

=== Professor Mazursky in other media ===
A variation of Myron Mazursky, renamed Edward Mazursky, appears in flashbacks in the Creature Commandos episode "A Very Funny Monster", voiced by Gregg Henry. This version is a scientist from Star City who was married to Lily Mazursky before she left him amidst his efforts to help their daughter Nina due to her being born with her lungs outside of her body. Despite inadvertently turning Nina into a piscine humanoid, he enrolls her in a private school to help her socialize, but she runs away after being bullied. After she is captured by the Star City Police Department, Edward attempts to intervene only to be shot and killed by one of the officers.

== Amanda McCoy ==
Amanda McCoy is a scientist who works at the company LexCorp and was once extrapolated for information about Superman by Lana Lang.

=== Amanda McCoy in other media ===
- Amanda McCoy appears in the fourth season of Superman & Lois, portrayed by Yvonne Chapman. This version is the acting CEO of LuthorCorp while Lex Luthor is in prison.
- Amanda McCoy appears in media set in the DC Universe, portrayed by Natasha Halevi.
  - McCoy appears in Superman as an associate of Lex Luthor who assists him in controlling Ultraman. Following Ultraman's defeat, McCoy and her fellow co-workers are arrested.
  - McCoy appears in the second season of Peacemaker, where she is released from prison to work for A.R.G.U.S.

== Ginny McCree ==
Ginny "Torcher" McCree was a member of Moxie Mannheim's Intergang branch in the 1940s and the love interest of Mike Gunn. Upon her arrest, she was remanded to Arkham Asylum, where she died in 1943. In the present, Moxie has Dabney Donovan clone him and his dead gang members into new bodies, with McCree gaining pyrokinesis.

McCree later springs Mike Gunn out of prison as they avoid the police. After Gunn is shot and killed, McCree commits suicide by self-immolation.

== Naomi McDuffie ==
Naomi McDuffie originates from an alternate universe where the degradation of Earth's ozone layer exposed Earth to a previously-unknown type of radioactive energy, causing 29 people from around the planet to develop superpowers. Naomi is the daughter of two of the eight remaining superhumans, with the rest either being killed or leaving Earth following a conflict. Zumbado, one of the remaining superhumans, tries to kill the infant Naomi. Consequently, her parents send her to Earth-0 for her safety and are killed in battle doing so. The infant ends up in a small Oregon town, where a Rannian ex-soldier and resident of the town, going by the name Greg McDuffie, witnesses her arrival, and adopts her. In Naomi's absence, Zumbado conquers Earth.

Naomi lives an ordinary life in her hometown raised by Greg and his human wife, who knows about her husband's secrets, until Superman crashes through the center of town in a battle with Mongul. This prompts a couple of citizens to talk about the previous time the town had an encounter with otherworldly beings. Having learned that the date of the incident was also the day she was adopted, Naomi questions whether she has a connection to superheroes and begins looking into her origins. Greg reveals his own origins to Naomi, before telling her about her arrival on Earth-0. He gives Naomi a device he found with her, which contains a message from her birth mother, and awakens her superpowers.

Following these events, Naomi flies to Metropolis, and meets Superman and Batman. She later joins the reformed Young Justice. Following the events of Dark Nights: Death Metal, Naomi joins the Justice League.

Her name is a nod reference to American comic creator the late Dwayne McDuffie.

=== Naomi McDuffie in other media ===
Naomi McDuffie appears in a self-titled television series, portrayed by Kaci Walfall. This version is a Superman fangirl living in the real world who is drawn into the DC Universe as she develops superpowers.

== Meanstreak ==
Meanstreak is a member of the New Extremists who can create power painful energy spikes. She was with the New Extremists when they were members of Overmaster's Cadre.

== Menace ==
Menace (Russell Tavaroff) he is a former friend of Luke Fox who became his enemy after being exposed to the Venom offshoot Snakebite, which gives him enhanced strength and durability, but damages his mind.

=== Menace in other media ===
Russell Tavaroff appears in Batwoman, portrayed by Jesse Hutch. This version is a Crows agent who Jacob Kane assigned to take over Sophie Moore's case.

== Menagerie ==
Menagerie is a name shared by two antiheroines in the DC Universe, both members of the Elite. The two are Puerto Rican sisters who are linked with a symbiotic alien weapon crèche called symbeasts.

Pamela first appears in Action Comics #775 (March 2001). While the origins of her powers are unclear in Action Comics #775, Manchester Black states that the rogue Men in Black (from the Department of Extranormal Operations) once picked up the dregs of society, turning them into weapons and selling them off to alien bidders. Black recruits Pam to be a member of the Elite. This group takes it upon themselves to "free the Earth of scum". They come into conflict with Superman during their first mission and Superman disables them following a showdown on Jupiter's moon, Io. The Elite are delivered into custody, but soon released by President Lex Luthor. During an assassination attempt on Luthor, Menagerie reveals to Superman that the Elite are acting against their wills. For her betrayal, Black places her in a vegetative state.

Sonja first appears in JLA #100 (August 2004). Following Manchester's apparent death, his sister Vera Black takes it upon herself to clear the family name and reassembles the Elite as a force for good. As Sister Superior, Vera convinces Pamela's sister, Sonja, to assume control of the alien cache as the second Menagerie. Vera then approaches the JLA with a proposition to form a sort of black ops JLA team: Justice League Elite.

=== Menagerie in other media ===
- The Pamela incarnation of Menagerie appears in Superman vs. The Elite, voiced by Melissa Disney.
- The Pamela incarnation of Menagerie appears in Supergirl, portrayed by Jessica Meraz. This version is Pamela Ferrer, a jewel thief who became bonded to a snake-like alien.

== Mentalla ==
- First appearance: Legion of Super-Heroes #14 (September 1985)
- Created by: Paul Levitz and Steve Lightle
- Abilities: Telepathy and psi invisibity
- Aliases: Delya Castil

Mentalla (Delya Castil) was a rejected Legion candidate who infiltrated the Fatal Five, but was found out and subsequently murdered by the Emerald Empress.

== Dell Merriwether ==
Dell Merriwether is a serial killer from Central City who was given the "ultimate super-costume" created by tailor Paul Gambi. He was defeated by the Flash and Green Lantern and sentenced to the electric chair.

== Micron ==
- First appearance: Batman Beyond S3E7 "The Call, Part 1" (November 2000)
- Created by: Paul Dini and Alan Burnett
- Abilities: Shrinking and growing in size

Micron is a superhero, successor of the Atom, and member of Justice League Unlimited. He made his first appearance in the Batman Beyond episode "The Call" (November 2000), voiced by Wayne Brady.

=== Other versions ===
A Future's End incarnation of Micron appears in Batman Beyond (vol. 5) as a member of the Justice League of America (JLA).

== Midas ==
Midas (real name unknown) is a scientist working on a bacterial strain that would be able to revolutionize the treatment of toxic waste. While demonstrating his findings, he encounters a woman who seduces him, but turns out to be an eco-terrorist hoping to steal the formula. The terrorists botch the job, causing an explosion which kills them. Injured by the explosion, Midas leaps into a river of toxic waste, and emerged as a monster made of waste. Midas constructs the Blood Rose robot, who becomes the love of his life, aiding him in a life of crime that especially worked against Oliver Queen.

=== Midas in other media ===
James Midas appears in the Arrow episode "Training Day", portrayed by Andrew Kavadas. This version is the corrupt CEO of Midas Medical.

== Mighty Bruce ==
Mighty Bruce is a small-time criminal and computer wizard who becomes a cellmate of Major Disaster. He joins Disaster in the Injustice League alongside Big Sir, Clock King, Cluemaster, and Multi-Man.

Mighty Bruce is with the Injustice League when Maxwell Lord reworks the group as Justice League Antarctica and adds G'nort and Scarlet Skier to their ranks. After an incident involving killer penguins that the Justice League International helps them fight, followed by an earthquake that destroys Justice League Antarctica's base, Lord fires them and disbands the group.

== Mikado ==
Mikado is a character appearing in American comic books published by DC Comics. Created by Dennis O'Neil and Denys Cowan, he first appeared in The Question #8 (September 1987).

Jerry Spaulding is a physician who works at a hospital in a Hub City slum, performing emergency surgery on victims of urban violence. A lover of fine comedy, including Gilbert and Sullivan's comic opera The Mikado, Spaulding decides to take the fight to the people who had caused all the pain. Wearing a mask of Japanese design, he adopts the nom de guerre Mikado and begins a series of attacks on the people who were causing all the pain.

== Mime ==
Mime (Camilla Ortin) was the daughter of a firework salesman named Oscar Ortin who had a disdain for loud noises. After the death of her parents, Camilla began practicing in the art of the mime artist. She started the Cameo Company until it went bankrupt driving her to a life of crime. She stole several bells from the churches across Gotham City before being apprehended by Batman and remanded to Arkham Asylum.

=== Mime in other media ===
Mime makes a non-speaking cameo appearance in The Lego Batman Movie as one of several villains recruited by Joker to take part in his attacks on Gotham City.

== Mindboggler ==
Mindboggler is a character appearing in American comic books published by DC Comics. Created by writer Joey Cavalieri and artist Rafael Kayanan, she first appeared in Firestorm (vol. 2) #29 (November 1984).

Leah Wasserman is a member of the Assassination Bureau, from whom she received the ability to generate illusions. In her first encounter with Firestorm, Mindboggler uses her powers to make him believe he is confronting an active volcano in Central Park and transmuting its fire into harmless Frisbees. Firestorm is in fact creating a rain of deadly razor blades, causing several civilians to believe he has gone insane.

Mindboggler later joins the Suicide Squad under Amanda Waller's leadership. After her squadmate Captain Boomerang sexually harasses Plastique, Mindboggler uses her powers to embarrass him. Humiliated, Boomerang refuses to save Mindboggler on their next mission, allowing her to be shot and killed. Following Mindboggler's death, the group Jihad utilizes a digital entity called Ifrit who possesses her appearance and personality.

== Mirror Monarch ==
Mirror Monarch is an alias utilized by several characters in DC Comics. The character, created by Geoff Johns and Francis Manapul, first appeared in The Flash (vol. 3) #1 (June 2010). The character is a heroic, futuristic member of the Renegades police force from the 25th century inspired by Mirror Master.

The first Mirror Monarch was killed by the Top to frame Barry Allen, and is succeeded by a second Mirror Monarch.

=== Mirror Monarch in other media ===
A female incarnation of Mirror Monarch, Eva McCulloch, appears in The Flash (2014).

== Angelo Mirti ==
Angelo Mirti was Sofia Falcone's personal bodyguard during her time as capo of the Falcone crime family, until he was killed by the Joker.

=== Angelo Mirti in other media ===
Angelo Mirti appears in The Penguin episode "After Hours", portrayed by Eugene Solfanelli. This version is an enforcer for the Falcone crime family.

== Mister 103/Mister 104 ==
Mister 103/Mister 104 (Jonathan Dubrovny) is a biochemist who suffered from a mental collapse according to Chief. He gained the ability to transform his body into various elements and became Mister 103, basing his name on the 103 chemical elements known at the time. After the 104th element rutherfordium is discovered, Dubrovny changes his codename to Mister 104.

During the "Infinite Crisis" storyline, Mister 104 appeared as a member of Alexander Luthor Jr.'s Secret Society of Super Villains.

=== Mister 103/Mister 104 in other media ===
Mister 104 appears in Doom Patrol, portrayed by Sendhil Ramamurthy. This version has the real name of Rama.

== Mister Handsome ==
Mister Handsome first appeared in Catwoman: Defiant #1 and was created by Peter Milligan and Tom Grindberg.

Mister Handsome is a crime lord and a one-time enemy of Catwoman. He is killed and replaced by his wife Mary who assumes the mantle of Mister Handsome. Mary was eventually defeated by Catwoman.

=== Mister Handsome in other media ===
Mister Handsome appears in Superman (2025), performed by Trevor Newlin. This version is an alien-like creature created by Lex Luthor in a petrie dish when he was twelve years old.

== Mister Poseidon ==
Mister Poseidon is a villain who wore rings that had different effects like a shrinking ring. He fought the Sea Devils and was defeated by them.

Mister Poseidon later constructed a ring that enabled him to break Ultivac out of the Fortress of Science outside of Metropolis. The two have a brief fight with the Forgotten Heroes, but manage to escape. Poseidon and Ultivac later met up with Enchantress, with the three assembling a group called the Forgotten Villains with Atom-Master, Faceless Hunter, and Kraklow.

During the "Infinite Crisis" storyline, Poseidon appears as a member of Alexander Luthor Jr.'s Secret Society of Super Villains.

== Mister Terrible ==
Mister Terrible is the name of several characters appearing in American comic books published by DC Comics.

=== First version ===
The first Mister Terrible is an unnamed man who is a criminal counterpart of Mister Terrific, possessing a version of the T-Spheres. During the "Infinite Crisis" storyline, Terrible appears as a member of Alexander Luthor Jr.'s Secret Society of Supervillains. When accompanying Deathstroke in an attack on the House of Secrets, Terrible attempts to kill Catman by stabbing his heart, but misses and stabs his leg instead. Mister Terrible later appears as a member of the Injustice League.

=== Earth 29 version ===
In 2016, DC Comics implemented a relaunch of its books called "DC Rebirth" which restored its continuity to a form much as it was prior to "The New 52". Mister Terrible comes from Earth 29 which is inhabited by Bizarros, being the Bizarro counterpart of Mister Terrific.

== Mister Toad ==
Mister Toad is a humanoid toad, a minion of Professor Pyg and a member of the Circus of Strange who was apprehended by Batman. He is later killed under unspecified circumstances with a chess piece in his hands; it would then be discovered that Joker was responsible. Toad returned in the series "The New Golden Age".

=== Mister Toad in other media ===
- Mister Toad appears in Beware the Batman, voiced by Udo Kier. This version is an eco-terrorist.
- Toad appears as a character summon in Scribblenauts Unmasked: A DC Comics Adventure.
- Toad appears in Beast Boy: Lone Wolf.

== Mister Who ==
Mister Who is the name of several characters appearing in American comic books published by DC Comics.

=== First version ===
The first Mister Who is a crippled scientist with a missing eye who created Solution Z, which gave him a variety of superpowers. He fought Doctor Fate before being presumed dead when the speedboat he was escaping in collided with a ship's hull. Mister Who survived the encounter by turning into a piscine humanoid. Getting his gang back together, Who fools the people of the city by posing as the unnamed mayor. After rescuing the mayor, Doctor Fate managed to apprehend Who while his gang got away.

Mister Who is among the villains who were recruited into Mister Mind's Monster Society of Evil.

During the "Infinite Crisis" storyline, Mister Who appears as a member of Alexander Luthor Jr.'s Secret Society of Super Villains.

=== Owl Haines ===
The second Mister Who is "Owl" Haines who fought Green Arrow.

== Mokkari ==
Mokkari is a New God of Apokolips who became a partner of the DNAlien Simyan. The two run Apokolips' Evil Factory, a rival of Project Cadmus.

In 2011, "The New 52" rebooted the DC universe. Mokkari is depicted as the half-brother of Simyan. He infiltrates Project Cadmus on DeSaad's behalf to obtain the technology there, which originated from New Genesis.

== Molecule ==
- First appearance: Teen Titans (vol. 3) #38 (September 2006)
- Created by: Geoff Johns and Carlos Ferreira
- Abilities: Ability to shrink
- Further reading: Molecule at the Comic Book DB (archived from the original); Molecule at the Grand Comics Database

Molecule is a character appearing in American comic books published by DC Comics. The character, created by Geoff Johns and Carlos Ferreira, first appeared in Teen Titans (vol. 3) #38 (September 2006).

Molecule is a teen superhero patterned after the Atom and a member of the Teen Titans during the "one-year gap" between the series Infinite Crisis and the "One Year Later" storyline. He is one of a group of teen heroes attacked by the Terror Titans and put in the arena of the Dark Side Club. While trying to escape, he is killed by the Persuader.

== Monarch of Menace ==
- First appearance: Detective Comics #350 (April 1966)
- Created by: Robert Kanigher; Sheldon Moldoff

Monarch of Menace is an enemy of Batman with a royalty theme. He was the first villain to beat Batman, and later retired after acquiring enough cash. The Monarch also has a son who was humiliated by the Monarch and his henchmen, driving the son to become the new Monarch and recreate his father's crimes, eventually being defeated by Batman and Robin.

== Mongal ==
Mongal is the sister of Mongul II (who is the son of Mongul I), introduced by her brother to Superman in Superman (vol. 2) #170. When Krypto the Superdog nearly killed Mongul II, Mongal escaped and reappeared to destroy New York City. After Maxima is killed in the Our Worlds at War miniseries, Mongal takes over her homeworld of Almerac before being killed by Mongul. Mongal was resurrected following The New 52 and DC Rebirth relaunches.

=== Mongal in other media ===
- Mongal appears in the Batman: The Brave and the Bold episode "Duel of the Double-Crossers!", voiced by Gary Anthony Williams. This version is the sister of Mongul, whom she is competitive towards, and is served by the Female Furies.
- Mongal appears in DC Super Hero Girls.
- Mongal appears in DC Super Hero Girls: Intergalactic Games, voiced by Julianne Grossman.
- Mongal appears in The Suicide Squad, portrayed by Mayling Ng. This version is a member of the eponymous team until she is killed in battle.
- Mongal appears as a character summon in Scribblenauts Unmasked: A DC Comics Adventure.

== Monk ==
Monk (also called Mad Monk) first appeared in Detective Comics #31 (September 1939) and was created by Gardner Fox, Bob Kane, and Sheldon Moldoff. He is among the earliest villains faced by Batman. Monk is depicted as a vampire who wears a red, monk-like outfit with a hood that bears a skull and crossbones. Later depictions establish that Batman believes that the Monk only pretends to be a vampire. However, Monk possesses genuine supernatural powers, allowing him to hypnotize others and transform into a wolf.

The Monk returned several decades later, when writer Gerry Conway revived him in 1982's Detective Comics #515. This version of the character is a post-Civil War plantation owner in New Orleans named Louis DuBois. He and his sister Dala are attacked by their vengeful ex-slaves and subjected to a voodoo ritual which transforms them into undead beings.

=== Monk in other media ===
- The Monk appears in the Batman: Caped Crusader episode "The Devil's Due", voiced by Blythe Melin.
- The Monk appears in All-New Batman: The Brave and the Bold #12.

== Monkey Prince ==
Monkey Prince is a clone of the Monkey King who was separated from his progenitor during a conflict with Darkseid and gestated inside a rock. Centuries later, Ultra-Humanite opens a portal to the Phantom Zone. The clone is transported to Earth, where Ultra-Humanite's daughter Laura Shugel and her lover Winston Shen adopt him and name him Marcus.

Marcus grows up in a loving household while remaining oblivious to his origin and his parents' criminal backgrounds. During Marcus' childhood, when his family lives in Gotham City, Batman breaks into their home during a thunderstorm to interrogate Winston and Laura, but flees after seeing Marcus. The experience leaves Marcus with a fear of bats, storms and water and a hatred for superheroes, which periodically cause him to suffer from panic attacks.

When Marcus is fifteen, the Shugel-Shens move back to Gotham due to his parents' work. After Marcus is tormented by several bullies at his high school, the school janitor Mr. Zhu encourages him to face his fears, prompting him to jump into the school swimming pool. Marcus is transported to Flower Fruit Mountain, where Zhu tells him that his true father is the Monkey King and reveals himself to be Pigsy, his father's comrade. Appointing himself as Marcus' shifu, Pigsy warns Marcus of an upcoming threat to Earth and places a circlet on his head, transforming him into the Monkey Prince.

The Monkey Prince becomes overconfident with his powers and initially uses them for selfish reasons, such as getting revenge on his bullies. His inexperience and fear interferes with his ability to maintain his transformation, forcing Marcus to accept Pigsy as his shifu and come to terms with his birthright. Under Pigsy's tutelage, the Monkey Prince overcomes his fears to awaken and control his abilities while discovering more about his father's history.

== Monocle ==
Monocle (Jonathan Cheval) is an honest businessman in the field of optics, who lost his business to a criminal's schemes. Determined to get revenge on the people that cheated him, Cheval invents a number of monocles that can emit beams of energy. He is eventually captured by Hawkman after killing two of the criminals, although the remaining one is jailed with him.

Decades later, after being released from prison, he is invited by the Ultra-Humanite to join his Secret Society of Super Villains which battles Hawkman along with the rest of the Justice Society of America and the Justice League of America. He and his colleagues are defeated and banished into an inter-dimensional limbo until the Ultra-Humanite from 1942 contacts his future counterpart, enlisting the aid of all criminals then present in limbo. Monocle briefly resides once more in 1942 until he and his allies are defeated once again, this time at the hands of the All-Star Squadron.

Monocle appears with Merlyn and other various villains and ex-Suicide Squad members in the mini-series Identity Crisis (2004). He was killed by Manhunter (Kate Spencer) in Manhunter #9 (2005).

In 2011, "The New 52" rebooted the DC universe. During the "Forever Evil" storyline, Monocle is among the villains assembled by the Crime Syndicate of America. When he assumes that the Crime Syndicate of America is actually the Justice League in disguise, Monocle is killed by Ultraman.

=== Monocle in other media ===
- Monocle makes non-speaking appearances in Justice League Unlimited as a member of Gorilla Grodd's Secret Society before being killed by Darkseid.
- Monocle makes a cameo appearance in Justice League: The New Frontier.
- Monocle appears as a character summon in Scribblenauts Unmasked: A DC Comics Adventure.

== Monster ==
Monster (Jason Rogers) is a character created by Gardner Fox, first appearing in All-Star Comics #20 (March 1944). He is an enemy of the Justice Society of America.

== Monstress ==
Monstress (Candi Pyponte-Le Parc III) is a character appearing in American comic books published by DC Comics. Created by Tom Peyer, Tom McCraw, and Lee Moder, she first appeared in Legion of Super-Heroes (vol. 4) #82 (July 1996).

Candi is a native of the planet Xanthu who was mutated by a gene bomb and gained superhuman strength after being caught in the accidental detonation of a gene bomb her father created. Shunned by her father and the working class, who viewed her as an enemy, Candi joined the Uncanny Amazers while looking for a place to belong. Candi originally possesses bright green skin, which Element Lad changes to orange as a prank. However, she accepts her new skin color despite Element Lad being able and willing to change it back. During the Legion Lost storyline, Monstress is killed by Element Lad, who has gone insane and become the villain Progenitor after being lost in space.

=== Monstress in other media ===
Monstress appears as a character summon in Scribblenauts Unmasked: A DC Comics Adventure.

== Juan Montez ==
Juan Montez is a former professional boxer who went by the nickname "Mauler" and is a former sparring partner of Ted Grant. With Maria Montez, he became the father of Yolanda Montez. When Grant was thought to be lost in Limbo, Nuklon gave his champion belt to Juan to remember him by.

=== Juan Montez in other media ===
Juan Montez appears in Stargirl, portrayed by Wilmer Calderon. This version is Catholic.

== Maria Montez ==
Maria Montez is the wife of Juan Montez and an old friend of Ted Grant. When Maria and her unnamed sister were pregnant, they were experimented upon by the evil Doctor Love. The side effects of the experiments were behind Yolanda Montez's abilities and she supported her daughter's campaign as the second Wildcat.

After Yolanda was killed by Eclipso, Maria brought her body to a witch who was able to bring Yolanda back to life. However, this was exposed as a scam by the original Wildcat.

=== Maria Montez in other media ===
Maria Montez appears in Stargirl, portrayed by Kikey Castillo. This version is a Catholic housewife.

== Moonbow ==
Moonbow (Brittany Brandon) was created by Gerry Conway and Joe Brozowski, and first appeared in Firestorm (vol. 2) #48 (June 1986).

Moonbow is introduced as a moon-themed criminal who wields a steel longbow. She attacks two rival gangs, drawing the attention of the police and Firestorm (Ronnie Raymond). When Firestorm confronts Moonbow, he inadvertently allows her to escape. In their next encounter, Firestorm allows Moonbow to escape again, describing her as a misguided Robin Hood-esque vigilante. Moonbow is revealed to be Brittany Brandon, Ronnie's classmate.

In Doomsday Clock, Moonbow appears as an operative of the Department of Metahuman Affairs.

== Moon Maiden ==
Moon Maiden (Laura Klein) is a DC Comics superhero who first appeared in JLA Giant Size Special #3 (October 2000). She was created by Dan Curtis Johnson and Dale Eaglesham. JLA Giant Size Special was the character's only major appearance and was written as if she had been a superhero and member of the Justice League for years.

Moon Maiden was originally known as the Praemonstra Supra and was created by the Hundred, a group of ancient Romans devoted to peace who fled the Roman Empire. The Hundred accidentally created the villain known as the Centurion while attempting to create a champion to enforce their ideology, then created the Praemonstra Supra to combat him. She was subsequently adopted by Hugh Klein, an astronaut who arrived on the Moon.

After learning of her origin and purpose, Laura becomes a superhero and an early member of the Justice League. During a battle with the Centurion, Moon Maiden destroys his Erasure Weapon, which erases them both from history and causes most of the world to forget her.

== Sophie Moore ==
Sophie Moore was a cadet captain at West Point, where she held the rank of S-3, or Operations Officer. She was also the roommate and girlfriend of Kate Kane, who was herself the Brigade Executive Officer, one rank above Sophie. The two boxed competitively at the academy, with a strong implication that Kate beat Sophie in an academy championship match before their senior year. When Kate resigned from the academy due to DADT allegations, she did not rat out Sophie.

In 2011, "The New 52" rebooted the DC universe. Sophie's history with Kate remains intact. After graduating from West Point, Sophie eventually made the rank of colonel and accepted a teaching position at Gotham Military Academy. She later reunites with Kate by chance at a charity carnival, where she learns that Kate is engaged to Maggie Sawyer. She attempts to schedule a friendly dinner with Kate, to no avail.

=== Sophie Moore in other media ===
Sophie Moore appears in Batwoman, portrayed by Meagan Tandy. This version is accused of homosexual conduct for her relationship with Kate, though she still decides to stay in the military. She later became a high-level agent of Crows Security.

== Jared Morillo ==
Jared Morillo is a detective who works for the Keystone City Police Department.

== Mortalla ==
Mortalla is the wife of DeSaad and member of Darkseid's Elite. With one hand, Mortalla can induce sleep. With another hand, Mortalla can induce death.

== Mother Mayhem ==
Mother Mayhem is the name of three characters appearing in American comic books published by DC Comics.

=== Anna Resik ===
Anna Resik is the first Mother Mayhem and mother of the eighth Brother Blood.

=== May Bennett ===
May Bennett is the second Mother Mayhem and mother of the ninth Brother Blood.

=== Sonya Tarinka ===
Introduced in The New 52, Sonya Tarinka was a woman without a home and whose only constants were hunger and loneliness. This changed when she was approached by a charismatic man who would introduce himself as Brother Blood. Claiming to be more than man, he explained that everything with blood is connected by the Red that humans will not only be united under primal laws again but that something much bigger is coming to reset us all. Liking the idea of unity, she stayed despite his unorthodox religious flaws and became a loyal pupil. After absorbing energy from the Source, she gained the ability to control those connected by the Red in addition to utilizing blood-manipulating magic.

=== Mother Mayhem in other media ===
- A character loosely inspired by the Anna Resik incarnation of Mother Mayhem named Maya Resik appears in Arrow, portrayed by Ana Mercedes. After killing her husband Sebastian Sangre, her son Sebastian Blood frames her and has her sent to a mental institution before eventually killing her as well.
- The May Bennett incarnation of Mother Mayhem appears in Titans, portrayed by Franka Potente. This version is the mother of Sebastian Sanger who moonlights as a Metropolis-based archaeologist and employee of LexCorp in addition to leading the Church of Blood. After working with Lex Luthor to uncover a temple in Azarath, she kills him to lure out Sanger and indoctrinate him into the Church of Blood. She is later killed in battle against the Titans.
- An unidentified Mother Mayhem appears in Teen Titans: The Judas Contract, voiced by Meg Foster.

== Mudslide ==
Mudslide is an unnamed man and a member of the Masters of Disaster who possesses geokinesis, which allow him to liquefy rocks with a touch.

== Sojourner Mullein ==
Sojourner "Jo" Mullein is a superheroine, known as the Green Lantern, appearing in American comic books published by DC Comics. She was raised a child of divorce in New York City. After witnessing the 9/11 attacks, Jo was inspired to make a difference in the world. She graduated valedictorian in her high school and joined the United States Army, and later the New York City Police Department. During her police career, she witnessed her partner beat a suspect nearly to death. Before being able to turn him in, Jo was suddenly fired after being tagged in a Black Lives Matter Facebook post. After being fired, Jo was approached by a Guardian of the Universe, who issued her a Power ring and a challenge: "One year to make a difference."

Following Infinite Frontier, Mullein began appearing in mainstream Green Lantern comics, becoming a main Green Lantern alongside Hal Jordan, John Stewart, etc.

=== Sojourner Mullein in other media ===
Jo Mullein makes a non-speaking appearance in the DC Super Hero Girls episode "#CruzControl".

== Multiplex ==
- First appearance: Firestorm #1 (March 1978)
- Created by: Gerry Conway; Al Milgrom
- Abilities: Self-duplication; Superhuman strength
- Aliases: Danton Black
- Further reading: Multiplex at the Comic Book DB (archived from the original); Multiplex at the Grand Comics Database

Multiplex (Danton Black) is a nuclear physicist who was Martin Stein's assistant in the designing of the Hudson Nuclear Facility. Feeling that he is not receiving his due credit, he begins stealing lab equipment. After being caught by Stein and fired, Black publicly accuses him of stealing his designs for the power plant. Stein, fearing that delays would cause the public to believe the reactors unsafe, decides to bring the reactors online. Simultaneously, Black breaks into the facility to steal blueprints he could use to fabricate evidence supporting his accusations against Stein. A bomb placed in the facility by a protest group explodes, transforming Stein and student Ronnie Raymond into Firestorm and giving Black the ability to clone himself.

Multiplex originally works as an operative of the 2000 Committee under the command of Henry Hewitt. He later appears as a member of the Suicide Squad and the Secret Society of Super Villains.

=== Powers and abilities of Multiplex ===
Multiplex can generate duplicates of himself, called "duploids", that share his consciousness and are mentally linked to him. The number that he can create is limited by the amount of energy he has, but he can absorb energy to create more. Each duploid possesses a degree of superhuman strength.

=== Multiplex in other media ===
- Danton Black / Multiplex appears in The Flash episode "Fastest Man Alive", portrayed by Michael Christopher Smith. This version is a former employee of Stagg Industries who seeks revenge on Simon Stagg for stealing his research in cloning, which led to the death of his wife. As a result of being exposed to dark matter after S.T.A.R. Labs's particle accelerator exploded while he was experimenting on himself, Black gained the ability to create mindless duplicates of himself that he can control mentally. Black attempts to pursue revenge against Stagg before being defeated by the Flash and falling to his death.
- Multiplex appears as a character summon in Scribblenauts Unmasked: A DC Comics Adventure.

== Murmur ==
Murmur (Michael Amar) is a once respected surgeon, succumbed to madness and started a killing spree to stop the voices inside his head. This spree went through Central and Keystone City and caught the eye of police officers Fred Chyre and Joe Jackam. They later tracked Amar down with the help from Central City forensic scientist, Barry Allen. Part of Amar's psychosis is the inability to stop himself from blurting out his crimes. Because of these outbursts, he is quickly convicted and sentenced to death.

It is soon discovered that Amar's blood is so abnormal that lethal injection can not kill him. While incarcerated in Iron Heights prison, Amar cuts out his own tongue and sews his mouth shut so he will no longer be able to incriminate himself. Wearing a thin mask of his own design, Amar becomes known as Murmur. While in prison, Murmur creates a virus that kills the guards and prisoners and escapes during the riots it causes. He then joins Blacksmith, who helps him with creating the virus, and her rogues. Afterwards, Murmur strikes out on his own.

=== Murmur in other media ===
- Murmur appears in Arrow, portrayed by Adrian McMorran. This version was beaten by corrupt police officers and forced to confess to a crime he did not commit for which he served time in Iron Heights Penitentiary and had his mouth sewn shut. Upon being released, he seeks revenge by stealing diamonds to create bullets only to be foiled and subdued by Team Arrow. As of the fourth season, Murmur has been re-incarcerated and built up a gang. While threatening Damien Darhk, the former forces Murmur to kill his gang and threatens him into joining H.I.V.E. The latter goes on to contribute to helping Darhk escape prison and kill Black Canary before mounting a failed attempt on Noah Kuttler's life, only to be foiled by Oliver Queen and John Diggle.
- Murmur appears as a character summon in Scribblenauts Unmasked: A DC Comics Adventure.
- A female incarnation of Murmur named Michelle Amar appears in the ninth season of The Flash, portrayed by Alexandria Wailes. This version is a member of the Red Death's Rogues who is described as an "angry med student turned serial killer", wields a knife created from Wayne Enterprises technology, and communicates through sign language.

== Dexter Myles ==
Dexter Myles is a former actor and the curator of the Flash Museum.

=== Dexter Myles in other media ===
Dexter Myles appears in The Flash, portrayed by Bruce Harwood and voiced by Robert Picardo.

== Mysto ==
Mysto the Magician Detective is a character in the DC Universe. He first appeared in Detective Comics #203 (January 1954). Mysto was a regular back-up feature in Detective Comics #203–212 (October 1954). He was dropped when Detective Comics went from 44 pages to 36. Mysto's only Modern Age appearance was in Detective Comics #500 (March 1981), in a special anniversary team-up story featuring Slam Bradley, Roy Raymond, and many other detectives that had once appeared in previous issues.

Rick Carter is a Wildcat flier piloting a small single-engine plane over the Tibetan plains when he spots three bandits chasing a lone old man. In gratitude for Carter saving the old man's life, Carter is taught ancient mysticism as well as tricks of the marketplace. Carter and his manservant Sikhi return to the United States to fight crime, using his skills as a stage magician.
