= Melissa Disney =

American actress

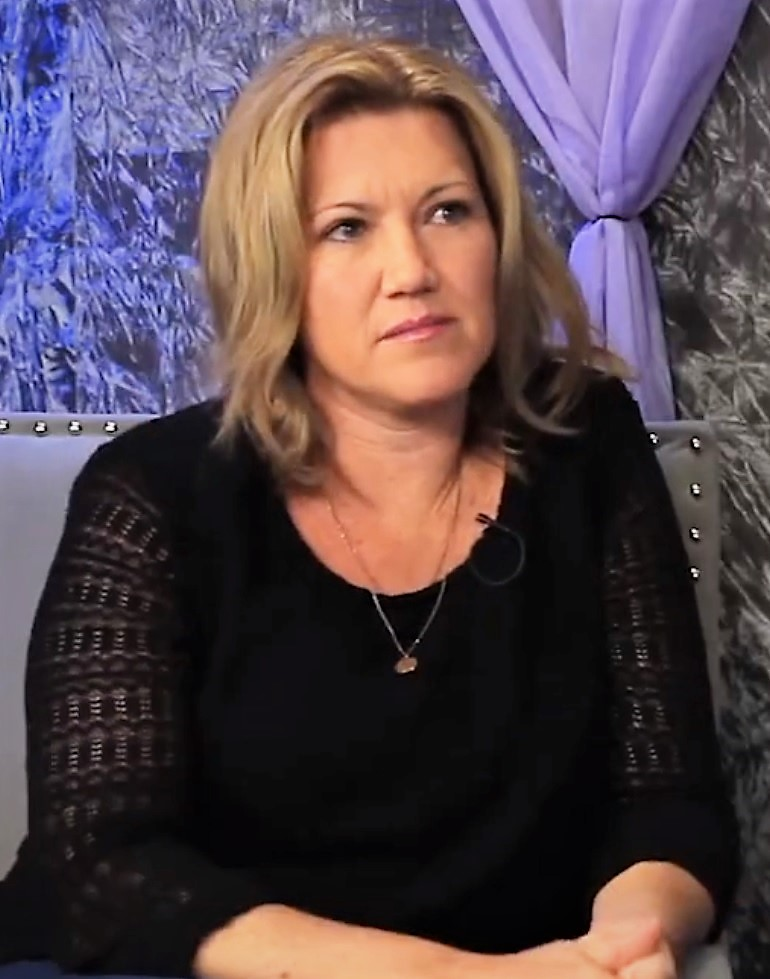
- Disney in 2020
- Occupations: Voice actress; writer
- Years active: 1995–present
- Spouse: Ryan Paul James (m. 2010)
- Website: www.melissadisney.com

Melissa Disney is an American films, television and voice actress and writer. She is most known as the voice of the titular character in the Nickelodeon animated series As Told by Ginger. Disney's other voice roles include Vivi Ornitier in Kingdom Hearts II (2005), Menagerie in Superman vs. The Elite (2012), and Imoen in the Baldur's Gate series.

== Early life ==
Disney is the granddaughter of silent film actress Toy Gallagher. She has often claimed to be a distant relative of American film producer and businessman Walt Disney.

== Career ==
Disney is one of a small number of women who do voice-over work for film trailers. The trailer for Gone in 60 Seconds, which she voiced in 2000, was one of the first by a major film studio to use a female voice.

She voiced the title character Ginger Foutley in the animated series As Told by Ginger. She is also known for her role as Elora the Faun in Spyro 2: Gateway to Glimmer (1999) and Courtney Gears (a parody of Courtney Love and Britney Spears) in Ratchet & Clank: Up Your Arsenal (2004).

She appeared as the character Melinda Chisney in Lake Bell's directorial debut In a World... (2013), a film about voice artists.

== Personal life ==
Disney is married to actor and writer Ryan Paul James. They were married on October 15, 2010, in San Diego, California.

== Filmography ==
=== Film ===
Year	Title	Role	Notes
1996	Reasons of the Heart	Crystal	
1998	Rusty: A Dog's Tale	Boo (voice)	
2000	The Life & Adventures of Santa Claus	Gardenia, Village Girl (voice)	
2000	Batman Beyond: Return of the Joker	Bobbi "Blade" Sommer (voice)	Direct-to-video
2001	The Trumpet of the Swan	Billie (voice)	
2003–2009	Hermie and Friends series	Lucy Ladybug, Hailey, Bailey, Lizzie, Adam Ant, Annette Ant (voice)	Direct-to-video
2011	Top Cat: The Movie	Trixie (voice)	
2012	Superman vs. The Elite	Menagerie (voice)	Direct-to-video
2013	Superman: Unbound	Thara Ak-Var (voice)	Direct-to-video
2013	In a World...	Melinda Chisney	
2020	The Croods: A New Age	Guy's Mother (voice)	

=== Television ===
Year	Title	Role	Notes
1998	I Am Weasel	Judge (voice)	Episode: "I.R.'s Phantom Foot"
1999	Superman: The Animated Series	College Girl (voice)	Episode: "Superman's Pal"
1999	Detention	Brittney (voice)	Episode: "Little Miss Popular"
1999–2000	Batman Beyond	Bobbi "Blade" Sommer, Curaré	6 episodes
2000	Static Shock	Nurse (voice)	2 episodes
2000–2006	As Told by Ginger	Ginger Foutley (voice)	Main role
2002	Dexter’s Laboratory	Girl #3, Girl #6.	Episode: "Would You Like That in the Can"
2003–2007	Jakers! The Adventures of Piggley Winks	Meg (voice)	Main role
2006	35th Annual Key Art Awards	Self (Announcer)	
2009	The Garfield Show	Nathan (voice)	Episode: "Neighbor Nathan"
2009	iCarly	Debbie	Episode: "iCook"
2011	84th Academy Awards	Self (Announcer)	
2017	Justice League Action	Mom, Brat (voice)	Episode: "Nuclear Family Values"
2019	92nd Academy Awards	Self (Announcer)	
2024	Georgie & Mandy's First Marriage	Answering Machine (voice)	Episode: "Secrets, Lies and a Chunk of Change"

=== Video games ===
Year	Title	Role	Notes
1998	Baldur's Gate	Imoen, Ithmeera	
1999	Spyro 2: Ripto's Rage!	Elora, Handel, Greta	
1999	Interstate '82	Sky Champion	
2000	Animorphs: Know the Secret	Rachel	
2000	Baldur's Gate II: Shadows of Amn	Imoen, Surayah Farrahd	
2000	Disney's 102 Dalmatians: Puppies to the Rescue	Fidget, Priscilla	
2000	Sacrifice	Seraph	
2001	Fallout Tactics: Brotherhood of Steel	Evita Eastwood	
2001	Baldur's Gate II: Throne of Bhaal	Imoen	
2002	Lilo and Stitch Hawaiian Adventure	Myrtle Edmonds, Elena, Teresa, Yuki	
2002	Ratchet & Clank	Starlene	
2003	Tony Hawk's Underground	Female Custom Skater	
2004	Shark Tale: Fintastic Fun!	Angie	
2004	Shark Tale	Angie, Shortie, Old Lady Fish	
2004	Tony Hawk's Underground 2	Female Custom Skater	
2004	Ratchet & Clank: Up Your Arsenal	Courtney Gears, Janice	
2005	Kingdom Hearts II	Vivi Ornitier	
2005	Jade Empire	Doctor An, Scholar Cai, Attendant Kitan	
2007	Bee Movie Game	Vanessa Bloome, Scientist	
2007	Disney Princess: Enchanted Journey	Narrator, Zara	
2008	Secret Agent Clank	Courtney Gears	
2012	Prototype 2	Sabrina Golloway	
2013	Marvel Heroes	American Dream	
2013	Deadpool	Psylocke, Rogue	
2016	Baldur's Gate: Siege of Dragonspear	Imoen	
2017	Prey	Science Operator AI	

== Awards ==
Disney won a Key Art Award for voicing the Gone in 60 Seconds trailer.
