= Thomas Currie =

Thomas Currie may refer to:

- Tom Currie (footballer) (born 1970), Scottish former footballer
- Tom W. Currie, American pastor, college president, and college football coach
- Thomas Currie, one of the first settlers of Tristan da Cunha
- Thomas Currie, a fictional character in The Books of Magic

== See also ==
- Thomas Curry (disambiguation)
