= The Elite (DC Comics) =

Group of fictional characters

- The original line up from Action Comics #775. Clockwise: Menagerie (foreground), Hat, Manchester Black, and Coldcast.

Publication information
- Publisher: DC Comics
- First appearance: Action Comics #775 (March 2001)
- Created by: Joe Kelly; Doug Mahnke

In-story information
- Member(s): Coldcast; The Hat; Manchester Black; Menagerie; Vera Black

The Elite is a team of fictional super-powered antiheroes appearing in American comic books published by DC Comics, in particular those featuring Superman and The Justice League. They are DC's response to Wildstorm's The Authority. The Elite made their first appearance in the story "What's So Funny About Truth, Justice & the American Way?", published in Action Comics #775 (March 2001). The story, which was voted number 1 in Wizard magazine's "Top Ten Comics of the Decade", was written by Joe Kelly, inked by Tom Nguyen and penciled by Doug Mahnke and Lee Bermejo. They appeared as antagonists before some of the characters merged with members of the Justice League to form the Justice League Elite.

== Fictional team history ==
The Elite were initially formed by Manchester Black as a team to do what he felt conventional heroes would not, which amounted to the team killing their enemies. This brings them into conflict with Superman in particular, who is disturbed at how the public were so quick to accept the Elite as killers because they seemingly got "results". Superman agrees to a confrontation with the Elite to prove a point, letting them seemingly defeat him and then rallying to defeat the Elite in a manner that made it look like he had killed them. This culminates in Superman apparently lobotomizing Black with his heat vision to remove his powers. As Black protests about how Superman had ruined his reputation, Superman revealed that he had done this just to demonstrate how scary it was when heroes actively fought to kill; in reality he had saved the Elite at the last minute, and all he had done to Black was give him a forced concussion that temporarily disabled his powers. Black vows to come back and defeat Superman, but Superman vows that he would keep fighting for an ideal world rather than give in to Black's cynicism.

After spending months working for the government on a new Suicide Squad, Black escapes with his powers restored. Having learned Superman's secret identity, Black rallies various other supervillains to mount a mass attack on Clark Kent's friends and acquaintances, even as the original Elite turned against him with Coldcast in particular now inspired by Superman's example. Menagerie is left in a vegetative state when Black triggers a stroke in punishment for her attempt to help Superman, while Coldcast and the Hat leave the battle. After Superman defeats the assembled forces sent against him, he returns home to find that Black had seemingly killed Lois Lane. When Superman refuses to kill Black, Black reveals that Lois's death was an illusion intended to provoke Superman into breaking his moral code. Distraught, Black ends his campaign against Superman and commits suicide.

Months later, a series of natural disasters are identified as a "rebellion" by the spirit of Mother Earth itself by the Hat, now working with Menagerie's sister, Coldcast, and Manchester's sister Vera. After the Elite help the Justice League deal with this problem by providing an enemy for the human race to unite against, Vera proposes that she be allowed to assemble a superhuman "black ops" team to deal with threats before they went public. The Elite's members ally with the Justice League, forming Justice League Elite.

== Team members ==
- Manchester Black is the team's first leader. A British telekinetic vigilante, currently inactive after realizing that he had become as bad as the villains that he wanted to fight. His Union Jack tattoo echoes the Authority's Jenny Sparks' t-shirt.
- Vera Black is a British psionic cyborg, sister of Manchester Black, and the second leader of the Elite.
- Coldcast is a muscular African-American man who sports dreadlocks and chains around his neck and wrists. He is capable of manipulating electromagnetism. Coldcast was eventually inspired by Superman to fight on the side of heroes.
- The first Menagerie is a Puerto Rican woman with a symbiotic suit of armor that allows her to transform into a chimeric creature. She was lobotomized and rendered comatose.
- The second Menagerie is the sister of the first Menagerie. She joins with an alien weapon cache that drives her insane, and later is incarcerated in a metahuman prison facility.
- The Hat is a young and powerful Asian Earth elemental with a measure of invulnerability and an ability to breathe fire. He is armed with a magic hat from which he can pull any item he desires, summon demons, and wield magic. He quits the team shortly after Vera Black takes over.
- Bunny is a bacterial colony that became a floating fortress before the Elite brought her to their universe to use as a base of operations.

== Collected editions ==
The Elite made their second appearance in the event story Ending Battle which was collected into a trade paperbacks of the same name:

- Justice League Elite:
  - Volume 1 (collects: Action Comics #775, JLA #100, JLA Secret Files 2004, and Justice League Elite #1–4, 208 pages, 2005)
  - Volume 2 (collects Justice League Elite #5–12, 192 pages, 2007)
- Superman: The Greatest Stories Ever Told Volume 1 (includes Action Comics #775, 192 pages)

== In other media ==
- The Elite appears in Superman vs. The Elite, consisting of Manchester Black, Coldcast, Menagerie, and the Hat.
- The Elite appears in the fourth season of Supergirl, consisting of Manchester Black, Menagerie, the Hat, and a Morae. This version of the group comes together in response to Agent Liberty and the Children of Liberty's bigotry towards aliens and the U.S. government and the Department of Extranormal Operations (D.E.O.)'s perceived ineffectiveness against those who kill aliens.
