= Tim Curran (rugby union) =

- Born: Tim Curran; 9 May 1984 (age 42) Vancouver, British Columbia, Canada
- Height: 1.83 m (6 ft 0 in)
- Weight: 95 kg (14 st 13 lb; 209 lb)

Rugby union career
- Position: Centre / Fullback
Senior career
Years	Team	Apps	(Points)
- Brumbies
2007–2008	London Irish	2	(0)
2008–	Secom Rugguts		

Tim Curran (born 9 May 1984) is an Australian rugby union footballer for the Secom Rugguts in Japan. He previously played for London Irish and Super Rugby team, the Brumbies.

Although born in Canada, Curran was raised in Canberra, ACT.
