= List of DC Comics characters: C =

== Cadejos ==
Cadejos is a character appearing in American comic books published by DC Comics. The character was created by writer Mark Waid and artist Dan Mora, and made his first appearance in Batman/Superman: World's Finest #21 (November 2023). He was originally introduced as being from the alternative universe of Earth-22, the setting of Kingdom Come; his main universe counterpart was introduced in the 2024 storyline Absolute Power. Cadejos is named for the Cadejo, a entity in Central American folklore which resembles a dog and carries chains.

In 2026, Cadejos' backstory was detailed in the special issue Justice League: The Dark Realm, written by Mora. Cadejos is revealed to be Andrés Aguilar, a Costa Rican man who bonded with the spirit Cadejos after the kidnapping of his daughter Victoria. Their bond gives Aguilar the ability to transform into a werewolf-like form with pyrokinetic abilities. In addition, Aguilar wields two chains that can be used as a conduit for his fire.

== David Cain ==
- First appearance: Batman #567 (July 1999)
- Created by: Kelley Puckett (writer); Damion Scott (artist)
- Species: Human
- Teams: League of Assassins
- Abilities: Masterly trained assassin, martial artist, marksman, and weaponry (knives, explosives, etc.). Highly skilled in espionage, infiltration, and teaching.
- Aliases: Orphan

David Cain is a supervillain appearing in American comic books published by DC Comics. Primarily associated with the Batman mythos, Cain first appeared in Batman #567 (July 1999), and was created by writer Kelley Puckett and artist Damion Scott. David is a world-class assassin, father of Cassandra Cain, and a former trainer of Bruce Wayne whose lethal teachings were rejected by the future hero.

=== Fictional history ===
Becoming frustrated and a believer of eugenics, he decides to father and raise several children as assassins; he selects Sandra Wu-San and employs manipulation that included killing her sister to coerce her into having a child with him, Cassandra Cain, an act pivotal towards her becoming the ruthless master assassin "Lady Shiva". Raised by David in complete isolation and abused, Cassandra trained solely in body language and combat—at the expense of reading, writing, or speaking. She became one of the world's most lethal fighters, able to anticipate opponents' moves through their movements alone.

Cain reemerges in Batman: No Man's Land, hired by Two-Face to assassinate Commissioner Gordon. Cassandra intervenes and saves Gordon. Cain, visibly shaken by his daughter's defiance and new ability to speak, leaves Gotham. Lex Luthor hires Cain to frame Bruce Wayne for the murder of Vesper Fairchild. However, Cain has an ulterior motive: determining whether or not Batman is worthy enough to raise Cassandra. In the One Year Later storyline, Robin captures Cain and offers him to the League of Assassins to rescue Cassandra—only to learn she has become their new leader under the influence of Deathstroke's mind-control serum. Cassandra shoots Cain, apparently killing him, though his body is never found.

David Cain is reintroduced in The New 52 continuity reboot as an assassin working for the villain named "Mother". He is paid to eliminate some of the most famous and powerful people on the planet, no matter how seemingly impossible the task.

== Rex Calabrese ==
Rex Calabrese, nicknamed "The Lion", is a mob boss operating in Gotham City prior to Batman's times and wore sharp teeth dentures to evoke his namesake. After Jim Gordon was incarcerated at Blackgate Penitentiary for a crime that he did not commit by Lincoln March, he is visited by Batman as Gordon tells him about Calabrese and how he knew he would not stay on top forever. Gordon would later discover that his cellmate is Calabrese who was arrested under the alias of "Leo Leone". Using his lion-like dentures, he saves Gordon from one of Carmine Falcone's men. Afterwards, Calabrese mentioned to Jim that his daughter grew up without a father and only helped to protect any prison guards who had daughters of their own from going through the same thing that his daughter went through. As Falcone is taken out of Blackgate to be extradited to Hong Kong, he warns that Calabrese will take Gotham City for himself again.

A messenger of Calabrese approaches Catwoman and leads her to Blackgate Penitentiary to meet him. Upon arrival, Calabrese reveals to Catwoman that he is her father and would like her to unify the crime families of Gotham City.

=== Rex Calabrese in other media ===
Rex Calabrese appears in The Penguin, portrayed by Louis Cancelmi. This version is a gangster from Oz Cobb's youth who moonlighted as a revered community figure and knew Oz's family.

== Calamity King ==
- Further reading: Calamity King at the Comic Book DB (archived from the original); Calamity King at the Grand Comics Database

Calamity King (E. Davis Ester) is a superhero from the 30th century in the DC Universe. He first appeared in Adventure Comics #342 (March 1966), and was created by Edmond Hamilton and Curt Swan. He possesses the ability to cause bad luck and attempted to join the Legion of Super-Heroes, but was rejected due to lacking full control over his powers.

=== Calamity King in other media ===
Calamity King appears in the Legion of Super Heroes episode "The Karate Kid", voiced by Alexander Polinsky.

== Candlemaker ==
The Candlemaker was created by writer Grant Morrison and artist Richard Case, and first appeared in Doom Patrol (vol. 2) #51 (January 1992).

The Candlemaker is an egregore, an entity who was created from humanity's fears of the apocalypse. Initially residing in another plane of existence, the Candlemaker enters the physical plane using Dorothy Spinner as a vector and possesses an android body. Robotman and Will Magnus deactivate Candlemaker's body, leaving it to be destroyed by Spinner.

Candlemaker is reintroduced in the series Unstoppable Doom Patrol, where Houngan conducts a ritual that infuses General Immortus with the Candlemaker's power. Now calling himself the Eternal Flame, Immortus attacks the Doom Patrol until he is banished to the Bleed.

=== Candlemaker in other media ===
The Candlemaker appears in Doom Patrol, voiced by Lex Lang.

== Canterbury Cricket ==
- First appearance: Flashpoint: The Canterbury Cricket #1 (August 2011)
- Created by: Mike Carlin; Rags Morales
- Species: Giant cricket (formerly human)
- Abilities: Cricket physiology; Sonic screech

The Canterbury Cricket (Jeramey Chriqui), is a superhero appearing in DC Comics. The character first appeared in Flashpoint: The Canterbury Cricket #1 (August 2011), created by Mike Carlin and Rags Morales.

Chriqui first appeared in the Flashpoint timeline, where he was a University of Kent student and conman in Canterbury, England. When Wonder Woman and the Amazons invaded England, Chriqui took cover inside a church. When the church was bombed by an Invisible Jet, Chriqui connected with a cricket and emerged from the wreckage as a giant cricket.

With his new abilities, he leads the Ambush Bugs, an insect-themed resistance group, though all but him die in a battle with the Amazons. He later joins Lois Lane's Resistance.

The Canterbury Cricket appears in the main DC Universe in Doomsday Clock as a member of Knights, Inc., the United Kingdom's sanctioned superhero team.

=== Canterbury Cricket in other media ===
- Canterbury Cricket appears in Justice League: The Flashpoint Paradox, voiced by Dee Bradley Baker.
- Canterbury Cricket appears as a character summon in Scribblenauts Unmasked: A DC Comics Adventure.

== Carapax ==
Carapax the Indestructible Man is an enemy of Blue Beetle. The character, created by Len Wein and Paris Cullins, first appeared in Blue Beetle vol. 6 #1 (June 1986).

Conrad Carapax is Dan Garrett's archaeologist rival who discovered Jarvis Kord's secret laboratory. He attempts to activate a dormant robot there, and is killed by its malfunctioning machinery, which causes his consciousness to be transferred into the robot. He's defeated by Ted Kord.

Carapax confronts Superman and Firestorm; Firestorm attempts to vaporize Carapax's robotic shell, but Superman convinces not to as doing so would kill Carapax so Firestorm transmutes Carapax's copper wiring into germanium, causing him to lose energy and faint.

Carapax later returns, steam-powered and capable of withstanding technological attacks, as part of a group formed to take out Jaime Reyes who defeated him.

=== Carapax in other media ===
- Carapax appears in Batman: The Brave and the Bold #1.
- Lt. Ignacio Carapax appears in Blue Beetle, portrayed by Raoul Trujillo. This version is the cyborg bodyguard of Victoria Kord and the wearer of Kord Industries' OMAC technology.

== Frankie Carbone ==
Frankie Carbone is a mobster who works for Sal Maroni and his family.

=== Frankie Carbone in other media ===
Frankie Carbone appears in Gotham, portrayed by Danny Mastrogiorgio. This version is a close friend of and second-in-command to Sal Maroni who is later killed by Oswald Cobblepot.

== Carcharo ==
Carcharo is a member of Helix and cousin of the second Wildcat (Yolanda Montez); both were among the children who were experimented on by Doctor Love while they were still in their mother's womb. Unlike Love's other subjects, Montez and Carcharo were not raised by Love, as their parents were deported before Love could take their children. Carcharo gained a shark-like appearance; in response, his mother attempted to drown him. Carcharo survived in the oceans, gaining the ability to control sharks over time. Eventually, Carcharo returns to land and attempts to usurp control of Helix, but is killed in battle with Mister Bones.

=== Carcharo in other media ===
Carcharo appears in the Stargirl episode "Frenemies – Chapter Eight: Infinity Inc. Part Two". This version is a patient at the Helix Institute for Youth Rehabilitation.

== Joseph Carver ==
Joseph Carver is a scientist who worked on experimenting on the Speed Force as a member of Black Hole.

=== Joseph Carver in other media ===
Joseph Carver appears in the sixth season of The Flash, portrayed by Eric Nenninger. This version is the leader of Black Hole, the CEO of McCulloch Technologies, and the husband of Eva McCulloch. He encountered resistance from Team Flash and CCPD before being killed by Mirror Monarch.

== Aaron Cash ==
- First appearance: Arkham Asylum: Living Hell #1 (July 2003)
- Created by: Dan Slott; Ryan Sook

Aaron Cash is a corrections officer and one of Arkham Asylum's most respected security guards. His hand was bitten off by Killer Croc and he sports a prosthetic hook in its place. Unlike many of his colleagues, he is neither mentally unwell nor corrupt and is a trusted ally of Batman. Cash was created by Dan Slott and Ryan Sook and first appeared in Arkham Asylum: Living Hell #1 (2003).

=== Aaron Cash in other media ===
- Aaron Cash appears in the Batman: Arkham video game franchise, voiced by Duane R. Shepard Sr.
- Aaron Cash makes cameo appearances in Batman/Teenage Mutant Ninja Turtles Adventures.
- Aaron Cash appears in Lego Batman: Legacy of the Dark Knight.

== Christopher Castillo ==
Christopher Castillo was the bodyguard of Louisa Falcone during her stay in Italy.

=== Christopher Castillo in other media ===
Christopher Castillo appears in The Penguin episode "Inside Man", portrayed by Berto Colón. This version works as Sofia Falcone's bodyguard until he is framed by Oz Cobb as a mole for the Maroni crime family and shot by Luca Falcone.

== Cerdian ==
- Further reading: Cerdian at the Comic Book DB (archived from the original); Cerdian at the Grand Comics Database

Cerdian is a character appearing in American comic books published by DC Comics. The character, created by Dan Jurgens and Steve Epting, first appeared in Aquaman (vol. 5) #63 (January 2000).

Cerdian is the son of Tempest and Dolphin. He is not seen after Infinite Crisis and is confirmed to have died during the destruction of Atlantis.

In post-Rebirth continuity, Cerdian was rescued from the destruction of Atlantis by Granny Goodness and raised to be part of her Furies. Cerdian is later rescued by the Flash and safely returned to Earth.

== Sarah Charles ==
Sarah Charles is a character appearing in American comic books published by DC Comics. She was created by Marv Wolfman and Chuck Patton, first appearing in Tales of the Teen Titans #57 (September 1985).

Sarah Charles is a scientist working for S.T.A.R. Labs. She and Teen Titans member Red Star attempt to rehabilitate Cyborg after he is captured by the Wildebeest Society, launched into space, and loses much of his memory.

=== Sarah Charles in other media ===
- Sarah Charles appears in the DC Animated Movie Universe films Justice League: War and Justice League: Throne of Atlantis, voiced by Melique Berger.
- Sarah Charles appears in the Young Justice episode "Another Freak", voiced by Beth Payne.

== Charybdis ==
- Further reading: Charybdis at the Comic Book DB (archived from the original); Charybdis at the Grand Comics Database

Charybdis is a character appearing in American comic books published by DC Comics. Created by Peter David and Martin Egeland, he first appeared in Aquaman (vol. 5) #1 (August 1994).

Charybdis and his wife Scylla are international terrorists who attempt to kill Aquaman. When Scylla is killed, Charybdis is driven mad by grief. He uses his ability to suppress metahuman abilities to defeat Aquaman and attempts to absorb his powers to himself. However, he is unable to control his ability to communicate with fish and falls into a pool of piranhas, fusing with them and becoming Piranha Man.

== Charles Chase ==
Charles Chase, created by Marv Wolfman and Keith Pollard, first appeared in Vigilante #2 (January 1984).

Chase is the father of Adrian Chase and Dorian Chase.

== Doris Chase ==
Doris Chase, created by Marv Wolfman and George Pérez, first appeared in The New Teen Titans #29 (March 1983).

Doris Chase is the wife of Adrian Chase. Doris and her two children (Adam Chase and Drew Chase) were killed by a bomb meant for Adrian, planted at mob boss Anthony Scarapelli's direction. The trauma caused him to become the Vigilante.

=== Doris Chase in other media ===
Doris Chase appears in Arrow, portrayed by Parveen Dosanjh. This version is the wife of Adrian Chase (actually Simon Morrison / Prometheus in disguise) who killed her.

== Angela Chen ==
Angela Chen is a character appearing in American comic books published by DC Comics. She was originally created by Alan Burnett, Paul Dini and Bruce Timm, first appearing in Superman: The Animated Series episode "The Last Son of Krypton". She is based on Cat Grant and is voiced by Lauren Tom. Angela is a reporter for the Daily Planet and also hosted the news series Metropolis Today.

=== Mainstream comics history ===
In the Prime Earth continuity of comics, Angela Chen first appeared as part of The New 52 and DC Rebirth in Justice League of America: Vixen Rebirth #1 by Steve Orlando, Jody Houser and Jamal Campbell. She appeared in the comics as a talk show host.

=== Angela Chen in other media ===
- Angela Chen appears in Superman: Shadow of Apokolips, voiced again by Lauren Tom.
- Angela Chen appears in Smallville: Season Eleven comics. This version is a field reporter for the TV channel GNN.
- Angela Chen appears in Justice League vs. Teen Titans, voiced by Laura Bailey.

== Cherry Bomb ==
Cherry Bomb (Gloria James) is the daughter of chemist Brian James who worked with Roy Lincoln in making a liquid that can open any lock. After her father was killed in a raid on his laboratory, Gloria learned that Lincoln is the Human Bomb and gained superpowers after attempting to recreate the formula that gave him his powers. However, she was unable to control her powers and was forced to wear a special suit to have control. Gloria served as the Human Bomb's sidekick before being kidnapped by the Time Masters. In the present, she is rescued by Stargirl and brought to the present day by Hourman.

Cherry Bomb and Ladybug are adopted by Phantom Lady, who plans to have them join the Freedom Fighters.

== Daxton Chill ==
Daxton Chill is a character appearing in American comic books published by DC Comics. The character, created by writer Lee Bermejo and artist Khary Randolph, first appeared in Detective Comics: Endgame #1 (May 2015).

=== Daxton Chill in other media ===
In the Titans episode "Barbara Gordon", Dick Grayson searches Bruce Wayne's computer and discovers files on several young people, including Daxton, whom Bruce considered to replace Jason Todd in the role of Robin.

== Chillblaine ==
Chillblaine is the name of several supervillains appearing in American comic books published by DC Comics. Each version has a cold gun similar to that of Captain Cold.

=== First version ===
The first version is an unnamed man who worked for Golden Glider before being killed after he was possessed by Eclipso.

=== Second version ===
The second version is an unnamed man who fought Wally West as the Flash twice. After being dragged into the beam of his cold gun, Chillblaine escaped from police custody and planned to enact his revenge during the New Year's Countdown before being defeated by West.

=== Third version ===
The third version is an unnamed man. He and his henchmen robbed a bank. The Flash informed Jay Garrick, Impulse, Johnny Quick, and Jesse Quick about his fights with the previous people known as Chillblaine. They helped the Flash defeat Chillblaine and his henchmen.

=== Fourth version ===
The fourth version is an unnamed man who was tracked down by John Fox and Linda Park when the former was filling in for Wally West. John and Linda learned that Chillblaine worked with Golden Glider before killing the latter. John and Linda tracked down Chillblaine to an aquarium where they fall into his trap before defeating him. Captain Cold later tracks Chillblaine down and kills him to avenge his sister's death.

=== Chillblaine in other media ===
- An unidentified version of Chillblaine appears in the Robot Chicken DC Comics Special, voiced by Matthew Senreich. This version is a member of the Legion of Doom.
- An original version of Chillblaine, Mark Blaine, appears in The Flash, portrayed by Jon Cor. This version is a former scientist of Ivo Laboratories who was fired for creating a microchip that could be used for cryogenic technology to create his "cryo-bracelets" for personal usage. Introduced in the seventh season, he attempts to seek revenge and frame Killer Frost who he sees as a kindred spirit after he's defeated, arrested, and incarcerated in Iron Heights Penitentiary. Blaine later gets out after turning state's witness and, as of the eighth season, starts dating Frost until the latter is killed while fighting Deathstorm. In the ninth season, Blaine joins the Red Death's Rogues in constructing the Cosmic Treadmill in exchange for help in resurrecting Frost. However, The Flash appeals to his better nature, leading to Blaine betraying the Rogues and destroying the device. After taking time to reflect on himself, Blaine helps Team Flash against the Negative Speed Force.

== Chimera ==
Chimera is the name of several characters appearing in American comic books published by DC Comics.

=== First version ===
The first Chimera is a master of disguise who fought Batman.

=== Sanjeet Bhatia ===
Sanjeet Bhatia is a reality-warping woman who is an ally of the Teen Titans.

=== Adam Sharp ===
Adam Sharp is a super soldier who took the name of Chimera when he worked for the organization Checkmate.

=== Rau'ut L'lwer ===
In 2011, "The New 52" rebooted the DC universe. A Durlan named Ra'ut L'lwer used the Chimera name as a member of the Teen Titans.

=== Coombs ===
In 2011, "The New 52" rebooted the DC universe and introduced a new incarnation of Chimera. He is a diver named Coombs working for Triton Base who is mauled by sharks despite Aquaman's intervention and given experimental life-saving treatment by Dr. Edrid Orson involving a brain tissue sample of the sea monster Karaqan and other DNA grafts from several marine animals. This ends up transforming him into a tentacled piscine humanoid.

As a result of Dr. Orson's experiment, Coombs gains shapeshifting abilities, which he primarily uses to assume the abilities of aquatic animals.

=== Chimera in other media ===
An original incarnation appears in the Arrow episode “Emerald Archer”, portrayed by Ryan Handley, this version is Kevin Meltzer, who started collecting vigilante masks after being saved by The Green Arrow, and uses a Wayne Tech Exosuit.

== Fred Chyre ==
Fredrick "Fred" Chyre is a character appearing in American comic books published by DC Comics. The character, created by Geoff Johns and Angel Unzueta, first appeared in The Flash vol. 2 #164 (September 2000). He is an officer of the Keystone City police department's metahuman unit who assisted the Flash against Cicada and Weather Wizard.

=== Fred Chyre in other media ===
Fred Chyre appears in The Flash episode "Pilot", portrayed by Al Sapienza. This version is Joe West's first partner before Eddie Thawne and Patty Spivot.

== Ciji ==
Ciji is a former spatial law officer tasked with escorting a group of bounty hunters that were chasing Vril Dox, eventually joining him in the R.E.B.E.L.S. and L.E.G.I.O.N. teams.

== Circuit Breaker ==
Circuit Breaker (Julien Jourdain) is a character appearing in American comic books published by DC Comics. He was created by A.L. Kaplan and first appeared in Lazarus Planet: Dark Fate (2023), a tie-in to the Lazarus Planet storyline.

Prior to the events of Lazarus Planet, Julien was a struggling stage actor who made a living portraying the Flash. After being caught in a Lazarus storm, Julien gains a connection to the Still Force, which allows him to absorb and manipulate kinetic energy and negate motion.

Circuit Breaker is transmasculine and uses he/they pronouns. He starred in the 2023, 2024, and 2025 issues of DC Pride, an LGBT-themed anthology series.

== Cressida Clarke ==
Cressida Clarke is a character appearing in American comic books published by DC Comics.

Cressida Clarke is the granddaughter of Sebastian Clarke, a grandmaster in the Court of Owls. She leads the Court of Owls in their mission to get revenge on the Joker for use of their Talons.

=== Cressida Clarke in other media ===
Cressida Clarke appears in Gotham Knights, portrayed by K.K. Moggie. This version was planted by the Court of Owls into Bruce Wayne's life by being an attaché and keeping an eye on his adoptive son Turner Hayes when Bruce is busy.

== Clown ==
The Clown is a character appearing in American comic books published by DC Comics. The character, created by Cary Bates and Irv Novick, first appeared in The Flash vol. 1 #270 (February 1979). He is a serial killer who used clown gimmicks in Central City.

Lyle Corley was part of The Flying Corleys circus until his loved ones' accidental deaths from improper safety precautions so he wanted vengenace on the three officials for saving money as well as The Flash who defeated him. The Clown was also responsible for Hunter Zolomon's origin story due to Eobard Thawne killing Derek Fox before Ashley Zolomon killed him.

== Clownhunter ==
Clownhunter is a character appearing in American comic books published by DC Comics. Created by James Tynion IV and Jorge Jiménez, the character first appeared in Batman (vol. 3) #96 (October 2020).

Bao Pham is an American-Vietnamese vigilante living in the Narrows, who witnessed his parents' brutal deaths at the hands of the Joker at age twelve. As he grew up and watched the Joker's body-count rise, he came to believe Batman wasn't going far enough and that the criminal needed to die. Five years after his parents' death, the Joker waged war on Gotham, leading an endless army of criminals to attack Gotham. After watching some of his men burn down a comic book store, Bao finally decided to take matters into his own hands and became Clownhunter. Using a baseball bat with a batarang attached to the end, he patrolled the Narrows and killed roughly twelve of Joker's men during the war.

With the aftermath of the Clown Prince of Crime's defeat, Batman confronted Bao in his room. Having heard that he'd been forced to fight his parents' zombified bodies during one of the fights, Clownhunter berated the Dark Knight for destroying their bodies and for not killing the Joker directly. In response, Batman told him to give up the vigilante path and gave him the contact details of Leslie Thompkins, warning him that he'd be arrested if he killed any more of the Joker's thugs.

Sometime afterwards, Clownhunter tracked down Harley Quinn and planned to murder the latter for involvement with his parents' murder. As he prepared to attack, Batman subdued him. However, another vigilante called Ghost-Maker subdued the Dark Knight and brought them to an abandoned area of Arkham Asylum. Freed from his restraints, Ghost-Maker offered Bao the opportunity to kill Quinn without Batman's intervention, hoping to prove his point to the Dark Knight. Though he planned to go through with it, he relented after Quinn apologized for her actions. Bao then left the asylum whilst they confronted Ghost-Maker.

== Cobalt Blue ==
Cobalt Blue is the alias of several characters appearing in American comic books published by DC Comics as an enemy of the Flash who would be possessed by the Blue Flame Talisman. The character was created by Mark Waid and Brian Augustyn, and first appeared in Speed Force #1 (November 1997).

=== Malcolm Thawne ===
Malcolm Thawne is the twin brother of Barry Allen and a distant ancestor of Eobard Thawne. He is the present-day version of Cobalt Blue, utilizing the Blue Flame Talisman capable of stealing super-speed, and possess various speedsters, before being overloaded by the Speed Force.

=== 21st century version ===
The 21st century version of Cobalt Blue wore a glass armor. Not much was seen of him as he was defeated in about 30 seconds by the time travelling Jay Garrick and Iris West II. This version had brutally attacked the loved ones of the Flash of this era. Cobalt Blue was killed, but the Blue Flame Talisman possessed the child Alex and killed the Flash. However, the time-travelling Max Mercury and Sela Allen returned the boy to normal.

=== Chardaq Allen ===
The 25th century version of Cobalt Blue is Chardaq Allen. Wally West and Professor Zoom defeated Chardaq which returned him to normal.

=== 26th century version ===
The 26th century version of Cobalt Blue is a female. She infected the colony Petrus with a virus, but Blaine Allen sacrificed himself to stop the virus. Ten years later, Jace Allen and the time-travelling Jesse Quick defeated her.

=== Cobalt Blue in other media ===
- Cobalt Blue appears as a character summon in Scribblenauts Unmasked: A DC Comics Adventure.
- Cobalt Blue appears in the ninth season of The Flash (2014) as Cobalt-97. This version is the Negative Speed Force utilizing a time-displaced crystal which possesses various individuals throughout time before merging with Eddie Thawne.

== Coldcast ==
- Further reading: Coldcast at the Comic Book DB (archived from the original); Coldcast at the Grand Comics Database

Coldcast (Nathan Jones) is a member of the Elite who can manipulate electromagnetism for various effects. Manchester Black recruited Coldcast prior to the team encountering Superman in Libya. After the team's defeat and Black's apparent suicide, Vera Black recruits Coldcast into a team that eventually becomes the Justice League Elite.

=== Coldcast in other media ===
Coldcast appears in Superman vs. The Elite, voiced by Catero Colbert.

== Coldsnap ==
Coldsnap is a metahuman and member of the Masters of Disaster who possesses cryokinesis. He is in love with teammate Heatstroke, though they are unable to physically touch due to their opposing powers.

=== Coldsnap in other media ===
Coldsnap appears in Black Lightning, portrayed by Derick Lewis. This version gained his powers from an A.S.A. experiment called "Project Masters of Disaster".

== Combattor ==
Combattor is a character appearing in American comic books published by DC Comics.

Henry Lawrence "Larry" Chin is a cybernetically enhanced minion of Lex Luthor. An illusory version of Chin called Synapse battles Superman alongside Lex Luthor, Bizarro, and Metallo.

The real Chin, known as Combattor, later battles Superman on Lex Luthor's orders. Gangbuster attacks Combattor with his taser, which affects Combattor's cybernetics and causes him to suffer a fatal heart attack.

=== Combattor in other media ===
Larry Chin appears in Superman, portrayed by Paul Kim. This version is an employee of LexCorp.

== Commander Cold ==
Commander Cold is a character appearing in American comic books published by DC Comics. The character, created by Geoff Johns and Francis Manapul, first appeared in The Flash (vol. 3) #1 (April 2010). He is the leader of the Renegades who is inspired by Captain Cold.

== Condiment King ==
The Condiment King is a character appearing in American comic books published by DC Comics where he is generally used as comic relief. Although Bruce Timm and Paul Dini created Condiment King as a one-off joke character for Batman: The Animated Series, Chuck Dixon and Scott Beatty created their own version in Batgirl: Year One #8.

=== Buddy Standler ===
The Condiment King first appeared in the Batman: The Animated Series episode "Make 'Em Laugh" as stand-up comedian Buddy Standler, voiced by Stuart Pankin. He was brainwashed by the Joker using Mad Hatter's mind-control technology into becoming Condiment King to ruin his reputation as retaliation for being spurned during a comedy contest the previous year.

Buddy Standler made his comic book debut in Detective Comics #1000. This iteration is shown to have two henchmen named Salt and Pepper.

=== Mitchell Mayo ===
Mitchell Mayo is a criminal who operates as the Condiment King introduced in Batgirl: Year One. He was seen holding up a bank until he was defeated by Batgirl. He later made an appearance while committing a crime before being defeated by Black Canary, Robin, and Blue Beetle. While fighting him, Robin observes that the villain is potentially dangerous (if only because his condiment guns could cause anaphylaxis), but his ludicrous nature prevents the Justice Department from taking him seriously. In the aftermath miniseries of the Final Crisis storyline, the Condiment King appears on General Immortus' side, having been given acidic vinegar from Professor Milo. He is seemingly killed after being betrayed and bludgeoned with his own guns by the Human Flame.

=== Condiment King's equipment ===
The Condiment King makes use of various condiments (sometimes capable of causing anaphylaxis) as his weapons in his condiment gun. The condiments include mustard, ketchup, tabasco sauce, and vinegar.

=== Condiment King in other media ===
- The Mitchell Mayo incarnation of the Condiment King appears in Harley Quinn, voiced by Alan Tudyk. He first appeared in promotional artwork released for the show before appearing in the second-season episode "Thawing Hearts", competing against his rival Kite Man and Poison Ivy for a wedding venue. In the episode "Something Borrowed, Something Green", Ivy has her plant Frank eat Condiment King and his fiancée so she can have the venue for herself and Kite Man.
- The Mitchell Mayo incarnation of the Condiment King appears in the DC Super Hero Girls episode "#WorkingStiff", voiced by Bobcat Goldthwait. This version is an obsessive perfectionist who has been fired from multiple restaurants.
- The Buddy Standler incarnation of the Condiment King makes a cameo appearance in The Lego Batman Movie as one of several villains recruited by the Joker.
- The Buddy Standler incarnation of the Condiment King appears in Lego Batman 3: Beyond Gotham, voiced by Nolan North.
- The Mitchell Mayo incarnation of the Condiment King appears as a "Rare" figure in HeroClix.
- The Mitchell Mayo incarnation of the Condiment King appears as a playable character in Lego DC Super-Villains, voiced by Armin Shimerman. This version is a member of the Legion of Doom.
- The Mitchell Mayo incarnation of the Condiment King appears in Lego Batman: Legacy of the Dark Knight.

== Confessor ==
Confessor is a member of the Church of Blood and serves as the group's interrogator.

=== Confessor in other media ===
Confessor appeared in the fourth season of Titans, portrayed by Noah Danby.

== Harriet Cooper ==
- Further reading: Harriet Cooper at the Comic Book DB (archived from the original)

Harriet Cooper is a character appearing in American comic books published by DC Comics. The character was created by Bill Finger and Sheldon Moldoff, and first appeared in Detective Comics #328 (June 1964).

Harriet is the aunt of Dick Grayson and came to live at Wayne Manor after Alfred Pennyworth's death. She involves herself in both Grayson's and Bruce Wayne's daily lives and, on occasion, comes close to uncovering their secret identities. When Alfred returns from the dead, she remains at Wayne Manor at his insistence. Over time, health problems reduce her activities and cause her to eventually leave Gotham City.

Some details from the television series (her last name, her status as a widow) were added to the comic stories in Detective Comics #373 (March 1968).

In September 2011, The New 52 rebooted DC's continuity. In this new timeline, Harriet has appeared in the ongoing series Gotham Academy.

=== Alternate versions of Harriet Cooper ===
Aunt Harriet appears in Tiny Titans #33 (December 2010).

=== Harriet Cooper in other media ===
- Aunt Harriet appears in Batman (1966), portrayed by Madge Blake.
- Aunt Harriet appears in the Batman '66 tie-in comics.
- Aunt Harriet appears in the animated films Batman: Return of the Caped Crusaders and Batman vs. Two-Face, voiced by Lynne Marie Stewart.

== Core ==
Core is a character appearing in American comic books published by DC Comics.

Pavlo Stupka was a Ukrainian soldier with radioactive powers and functioning as living nuclear reactor, known as Core. He was chosen by Mister Bones to participate in a version of Stormwatch.

== Jim Corrigan ==
Jim Corrigan is the name of three different characters in American comic books published by DC Comics.

=== Jim Corrigan (Black Lightning supporting character) ===
An African American police officer based in Metropolis who worked with both Jimmy Olsen and Black Lightning. He first appeared in Superman's Pal Jimmy Olsen #149 (May 1972). He later became a regular supporting character in the series Black Lightning beginning with issue #4.

=== Jim Corrigan (Corrupt Gotham officer) ===
Holding no relation to the Spectre's version, Jim Corrigan is a Crime Scene Unit officer in the Gotham City Police Department who routinely abuses his position by selling crime scene memorabilia such as bullets, as well as more extravagant items lost by villains Although the internal affairs division is aware of Corrigan's activities, they cannot interfere due to an explosive encounter between Corrigan and Renee Montoya, of the Major Crimes Unit, when Crispus Allen is accused of murder. Corrigan kills Allen when he begins investigating him, with Montoya resigning from the GCPD in response. Corrigan is later shot and killed by Allen's young son Mal; later stories instead identify Corrigan's killer as Mal's brother Jacob.

== Inza Cramer ==
- First appearance: More Fun Comics #55 (May 1940)
- Created by: Gardner Fox; Howard Sherman
- Teams: Lords of Chaos and Order; Justice League Task Force
- Abilities: Skilled sorceress and archaeologist; knowledgeable in the supernatural and Egyptology. Magical powers bolstered from access to mystical artifacts like the Helmet of Fate, allowing for magical feats through imagination powered by either chaos magic or life energies.
- Aliases: Inza Sanders, Fate, Doctor Fate, Inza Cramer Nelson

Inza Cramer (also Inza Sanders or Inza Cramer Nelson) is a character appearing in American comic books published by DC Comics, first appearing in More Fun Comics #55 (1940), created by Gardner Fox and Howard Sherman. The character is typically portrayed as love interest and partner of the first Kent Nelson, who is a fellow archaeologist and is the superhero Doctor Fate. Later, the character becomes the fourth Doctor Fate and is later succeeded by Jared Stevens and eventually dies.

=== Fictional history ===
Inza Camer, a native of Earth-Two and descendant of Ezra Hawkins, joined forces with Doctor Fate after being kidnapped by Wotan. They fell in love, married, and earned doctorates in philosophy and archaeology. Challenges arose due to Kent's secrecy as Doctor Fate, causing resentment and strained relations. They defeated sorcerer Khalis but faced further turmoil when Inza's jealousy was exploited by a Lord of Chaos. Nabu intervened, leading to discussions and eventual reconciliation. Later, it was discovered that Inza's connection to the Tower of Fate and her human spirit provided protection against certain magical influences. To combat the Lords of Chaos, Kent, Nabu, and Inza merged, forming a stronger Doctor Fate. This experience deepened Inza's understanding of Fate's mission and helped mend their relationship.

After Crisis on Infinite Earths, Inza and Doctor Fate are transported to the mainstream universe. In the first Doctor Fate series, their aging accelerated, leading to Inza's mental breakdown and eventual death. Kent and Nabu chose young Eric Strauss as their successor. In the second series, Kent and Inza's spirits resided in the Amulet of Anubis, living a happy afterlife with a "child" named Kent Nelson Jr. They were later brought back to life in younger bodies to fulfill their roles as Doctor Fate once again.

In the latter part of the Doctor Fate series, Inza took on the role of Doctor Fate, empowered by the Lords of Chaos without her knowledge. She wielded higher-level magical power and focused on addressing social issues in New York City, befriending a skeptical policewoman named Debby Niles. Inza faced various threats, including ancient Egyptian gods and the entity T'giian, whom she freed from control and worked alongside. She also dealt with Shat-Ru, a Lord of Order trapped in Kent Nelson's body. Inza and Kent's marriage faced challenges, but they reconciled and realized the impact of their powers on others. As Inza's activities as Doctor Fate escalated, she and Kent questioned the source of her power. The Chaos intelligence behind the Helmet of Fate revealed himself, admitting manipulation of events and causing strife in their marriage. Inza's power was transferred back to Chaos, and she and Kent, empowered by a half-helmet and Shat-Ru, defeated Chaos. Despite facing scrutiny from the government, Inza displayed her immense power and denounced their historical injustices, declining an agreement with the President. Inza and Kent shared the mantle of Doctor Fate together.

In Zero Hour: Crisis in Time!, Extant rapidly ages Kent and Inza to their proper physical ages, nearly killing them.

In the original Fate series, Inza and Kent pass on the mantle of Doctor Fate to Jared Stevens, a criminal who acquires the artifacts of Fate. Inza and Kent guide him before their energies are drained by demons. In the Book of Fate reboot, Inza is depicted as mentally compromised and insane from her time as Doctor Fate. In this series, Kent and Inza meet Jared, who becomes the new host for Nabu. They are finally released from Nabu's service and ascend to the afterlife. Jared rejects both the Lords of Chaos and Nabu, becoming an "agent of balance".

Following Flashpoint and The New 52 reboot, a revised version of Inza appeared briefly in the second Justice League Dark series in a flashback. This flashback suggests that her history is similar to her pre-Crisis counterpart, where she acted as the partner of Kent Nelson and faced strains on their marriage due to his role as Doctor Fate. During the Dawn of DC initiative, the character's original brief tenure as Doctor Fate is restored. The New Golden Age storyline reveals that Inza and Kent took in Salem the Witch Girl, whom became the former's sidekick. However, Salem's dangerous abilities threaten Inza's life, leading Salem to run away. Despite Kent and Justice Society Dark's efforts to find her, Salem mysteriously disappeared, and their memories of her were erased.

The events of Zero Hour are portrayed as occurring approximately nine years before Khalid Nassour becoming the new Doctor Fate, although there are discrepancies within continuity regarding Nassour's initial appearance and the length of his involvement in Justice League Dark. The extent of Fate's injury from Extant remains unclear, as it is uncertain whether it affected Kent Nelson alone or if it occurred during a joint fusion between Inza and Kent, as previously depicted.

=== Characterization ===
The chief love interest of Kent Nelson, the most re-occurring conflict between the pair originates from of Nabu's negative influence, cumulating to martial rifts between herself and Kent, her partnership towards the original incarnation of Doctor Fate, and the abusive manipulations Nabu imposes to prevent the pair from discovering a merging between the two would both supplant Nabu in power and disallow him to further influence them. As Doctor Fate, Inza's heroic activities has an emphasis more on using her overwhelming magical abilities in more local and community settings alongside acting as a mystical defender. Among the most powerful of Earth's supernatural community, she is considered a more talented spell-caster than her husband.

=== Powers and abilities ===
A sorceress and archaeologist with natural magical abilities, she possess acute knowledge of the supernatural and specializes in Egyptology. As an incarnation of Doctor Fate, she is classified as a "sorcerer", using artifacts for protection against the inherent risks associated with magic; the Helmet of Fate granted her immense sorcerous powers, including the power to merge with Kent to become a joint being of greater mystical power, with the appearance determined by the initiator of the transformation. Unlike other incarnations, she is powered by chaos magic due to her patron being a Lord of Chaos although later, her abilities were instead derived from life energies. She also used the Globes of Power, autonomous magical orbs suffused with magic and act in a manner similar to artificial intelligence.

While a powerful sorceress, Inza's usage of chaos magic comes at a risk of affecting her mental state. With Nabu as her patron, her mental state was also compromised although this was due to a lack of formal training as an agent of order. Her magical abilities also has certain limitations, such as being unable to cure terminal illness like cancer.

=== Inza Cramer in other media ===
- Inza Cramer appears in series set in the DC Animated Universe (DCAU). This version and Kent Nelson live in the Tower of Fate and assist those who lack purpose in their lives. First appearing in the Superman: The Animated Series episode "The Hand of Fate", voiced by Jennifer Lien, she subsequently appears in Justice League and Justice League Unlimited, voiced by Jennifer Hale.
- Inza Cramer appears in Smallville, portrayed by Erica Carrol.
- Inza Cramer makes non-speaking appearances in Young Justice.
- Inza Cramer makes a non-speaking appearance in Doctor Fate's ending in Injustice 2.

== Gerald Crane ==
Gerald Crane is the father of Scarecrow. Gerald had a brief relationship with Karen Keeny which resulted in the son's birth, but as they were not married, Karen's mother and grandmother raised Jonathan as theirs, not even hiding their contempt for Karen, Gerald and Jonathan. Years later, Gerald moved to Gotham City, married and had two children, finding a job in construction. His son (as Scarecrow) came back in an attempt to kill him, but was prevented by Batman.

In The New 52 (a reboot of DC Universe continuity), Gerald Crane is portrayed as a villainous doctor who experimented on his son and locked him in a small dark room. Gerald Crane suffered a heart attack and died which left his son trapped for days until the police discovered him.

=== Gerald Crane in other media ===
Gerald Crane appears in Gotham, portrayed by Julian Sands. This version is a biology professor whose wife died in a fire years prior. He suffered from severe pyrophobia and developed a serum in an attempt to cure this fear, leading Jonathan to develop a fear of scarecrows before he was gunned down by Jim Gordon and Harvey Bullock.

== Crash ==
- First appearance: Steel (1994) Annual #1 (1995)
- Abilities: Skilled marksman, martial artist, and tactician. Proficiency in psychology, philosophy, and economics.
- Aliases: Crash, The Everything Man, Reggie Glover

Crash is a character appearing in American comics books published by DC Comics. The character first made his debut in Steel Annual #1 (1995), created by Louise Simonson and Joe St. Pierre.

The alter-ego of Clay Michael Irons, Crash is the brother of John Henry Irons and the father of Natasha Irons, both heroes whom use the codename Steel. A more troubled youth compared to his older brother John Henry, whom he was envious of, Clay sought solace in gangs after their parents' death while John excelled in academics. After marrying a woman named Blondell and fathering Natasha and Jemahl, he attempted to distance himself form gang-life but instead worked as a mob enforcer, taught psychology, economics, philosophy, tactics, and trained in weaponry and martial arts until his boss's death in a drive-by. Presumably killed, he was actually taken by a federal agent and placed in witness protection until his knowledge can be used to make arrests. Clay later starts a new family under the name Reggie Glover but a gang member he help put away discovered him and puts a hit on his family in retaliation. Clay becomes a powerful crime boss with intents to wage war against those responsible for the death of his mentor and second family while covertly protecting the Irons from the shadows.`

In 2011, "The New 52" rebooted the DC universe. Clay's background is similar although John is instead the younger sibling and becomes an exotic arms dealer known as "Crash" and the "Everything Man" who uses his earnings to care for his family and fund Natasha's advance education. After double-crossing the demonic criminal Skyhook, he retaliates by kidnapping Clay's youngest son Ezekiel and anonymously reports him to law enforcement. Ezekiel's status as a missing person and his criminality's role strains his relationship with Natasha and leaves Clay yearning for vengeance.

== Flo Crawley ==
Florence "Flo" Crawley is Amanda Waller's cousin and a mission coordinator for the Suicide Squad, which Waller runs. In an attempt to join the main Suicide Squad team, Crawley embarks on an unauthorized mission to Apokolips, during which she is killed.

=== Flo Crawley in other media ===
Flo Crawley appears in The Suicide Squad and Superman, portrayed by Tinashe Kajese-Bolden. This version is initially an aide to Amanda Waller, later a U.S. Secretary, who displays no explicit familial connection to her.

== Ned Creegan ==
Ned Creegan is a crook who was tipped off by Billy Blabbermouth about valuable jewels that are being used for scientific experiments. He breaks into the house of scientist Nevil Long, steals the jewels, and takes them to a fence. Exposure to the jewels transforms Creegan into a skeletal form with an electric touch that Robin dubs Bag O'Bones. After giving an antidote to Creegan, Long reveals that his lifespan is shortened for every second he remains in his skeletal form. After a scuffle with irradiated animals, Batman and Robin apprehend Long and have him give the antidote to Creegan. After selling his secrets to the government to avoid legal trouble, Long attends the trial of Creegan who is sentenced to 20 years in prison.

Creegan returns with new powers as the Cyclotronic Man and is hired by Tobias Whale to kill Black Lightning and Superman. He lures them out by capturing Jimmy Olsen. Cyclotronic Man was defeated by Black Lightning and Superman.

At Gotham State Penitentiary, Warden Brewster informs Creegan that his parole request has been denied. Having become One Man Meltdown, Creegan goes into a frenzy and escapes from the penitentiary. Batman brings along the Outsiders to help track down Creegan. During a fight at S.T.A.R. Labs, Creegan takes Halo hostage and uses her aura abilities to his advantage. Katana defeats Halo as it is revealed that Brewster has been experimenting on Creegan. Returning to Gotham State Penitentiary, Creegan helps the Outsiders defeat Brewster.

=== Ned Creegan in other media ===
Ned Creegan appears in the Black Lightning episode "The Book of Occupation, Chapter One: Birth of Blackbird", portrayed by Chase Anderson. This version possesses additional disintegration and telekinetic abilities and was part of the same program that gave Commander Carson Williams his powers. He assists Markovian forces in raiding an A.S.A. facility to target the metahumans there until they are killed by Williams who snapped Creegan's neck.

== Aleksandr Creote ==
Aleksandr Creote is a former KGB agent who partnered with Savant, becoming his subordinate and helping him in his missions, and to check his mental disorder, due to his unrequited love for him. During a scheme to extort Oracle into divulge Batman's identity, he came into conflict with the Birds of Prey, but eventually both Savant and Creote become their allies.

== Crimson Centipede ==
The Crimson Centipede is the name of several characters appearing in American comic books published by DC Comics.

=== Creation of Ares ===
First appearing in Wonder Woman #169 (April 1967), Crimson Centipede is initially depicted as a powerful entity resembling a human with multiple limbs who was created by Ares to battle Wonder Woman. The Crimson Centipede stages burglaries to fund widespread criminal enterprises and counteract Wonder Woman's peaceful influence.

=== Insectoid ===
In 2016 after DC Comics implemented a relaunch called "DC Rebirth". the Crimson Centipede is reimagined as an insectoid creature who was created by a S.T.A.R. Labs biotech firm and accidentally freed by meninists.

=== Crimson Centipede in other media ===
The pre-Crisis incarnation of Crimson Centipede makes a non-speaking cameo appearance in the Creature Commandos episode "Cheers to the Tin Man" as an inmate of Belle Reve Penitentiary.

== Able Crown ==
Able Crown was the leader of the Burnley Town Massive gangs of Gotham City who ended up being double-crossed and killed by Ra's al Ghul.

=== Able Crown in other media ===
Able Crown appears in The Penguin, portrayed by Leon Addison Brown. This version worked under Oz Cobb before he is killed by his second-in-command Victor Aguilar.

== Crush ==
- First appearance: Teen Titans Special #1 (June 2018)
- Created by: Adam Glass; Bernard Chang; Jorge Jiménez
- Species: Human/Czarnian hybrid
- Abilities: Superhuman strength, stamina, durability; Regeneration
- Aliases: Xiomara Rojas
- Further reading: Crush at the Grand Comics Database

Crush is a character appearing in American comic books published by DC Comics.

Xiomara Rojas was born to an unknown human mother and Czarnian bounty hunter Lobo. Mysteriously, she crash-landed in the middle of the Burning Man festival in the Black Rock Desert wrapped in a sentient chain known as Obelus. Obelus would not allow her to be touched, until she was discovered by the couple David and Lisa Rojas, who would adopt the child. The family would homeschool Xiomara, and would move a lot due to their debts and legal issues.

After seeing a report of Lobo fighting Superman, she immediately recognized her true father. She confronted her adopted parents, who had previously told her that her birth parents were superheroes protecting the universe. She ran away, and after being attacked by white supremacists at a gas station, returned to find her mobile home burnt to the ground, with her parents dead and Obelus missing.

She began to fight in illegal rings, where she took the name Crush. She was then approached by Robin, who invited her to the Teen Titans. She accepted, believing Robin could help her solve her parents' murder.

After the Teen Titans were enrolled as students in the newly formed Titans Academy, Crush quits the team after feeling she has no place in the school.

After leaving the Teen Titans, Crush would travel space to hunt for her father's bounty and confront him.

By the events of "Dark Crisis", Crush has seemingly rejoined the Teen Titans.

=== Crush in other media ===
Crush will appear in the upcoming series Starfire!.

== Cryonic Man ==
Cryonic Man is a character appearing in American comic books published by DC Comics.

Philip (last name unknown) and his wife, Melissa, were cryogenically frozen in the 1940s as part of an experiment that would allow them to escape a potential apocalypse. Philip, Melissa, and several other people remained frozen for four decades before being released in the 1980s. Philip realizes that Melissa and everyone else who was frozen has died, but their minds were preserved in the machine. Philip becomes the supervillain Cryonic Man in an attempt to create new bodies for his companions, but is thwarted by the Outsiders. He is murdered by his frozen companions when they learn the truth about their deaths and Philip's activities.

=== Cryonic Man in other media ===
Cryonic Man appears in Justice League Adventures #12 as a member of the Cold Warriors.

== Thomas Curry ==
Thomas "Tom" Curry is a lighthouse keeper who fell in love with the Atlantean queen Atlanna and fathered Arthur Curry who would grow up to become Aquaman.

In his early life, Curry caught a fierce storm at the sea, and Atlanna saved his life. They fell in love, got married, and eventually had a son, Arthur Curry. But Atlanna soon had to return to Atlantis to fulfill her duties as Queen. Thomas was left to raise Arthur alone in seclusion as Atlanna was afraid her enemies would seek to destroy her family.

=== Thomas Curry in other media ===
- Thomas Curry appears in Justice League: Throne of Atlantis, voiced by Larry Cedar.
- Thomas Curry appears in media set in the DC Extended Universe (DCEU), portrayed by Temuera Morrison.
  - Thomas appears in Aquaman (2018). Years prior, he found an injured Atlanna and nursed her back to health. They would go on to fall in love and have a son named Arthur before she is eventually forced to return to Atlantis to protect her family. For the next twenty years, Thomas began taking walks to his lighthouse's pier every morning, waiting for Atlanna's return, while he took care of Arthur. In time, he would be reunited with Atlanna.
  - An alternate timeline variant of Thomas appears in The Flash. After Barry Allen changes history while preventing his mother from being killed, this version of Thomas never met Atlanna and was married to another woman.
  - Thomas appears in Aquaman and the Lost Kingdom.

== Cyber-C.A.T. ==
Christina Chiles, a.k.a. Cyber-C.A.T., is a character appearing in American comic books published by DC Comics. Created by Jim Balent and Doug Moench, the character first appeared in Catwoman (vol. 2) #42 in 1997.

Christina Chiles had been working on a cyber battle suit modeled after a cat and decided to test it against Catwoman, who had broken into the lab in which Christina worked. Despite the powers the suit gave her, Christina (now Cyber-C.A.T.) was beaten by Catwoman. Infuriated at her loss, Cyber-C.A.T. began a personal vendetta against Catwoman. As Catwoman managed to elude her, Cyber-C.A.T. became more and more fixated on tracking her down. Another confrontation with Catwoman resulted in failure because of the help of Catwoman's rival, the She-Cat.

Cyber-C.A.T. made one final attempt on Catwoman's life, but Catwoman had received her own suit of armor, which gave her powers on par with Cyber-C.A.T.'s, and finally destroyed the armor. Christina was taken into custody by the agency she worked for because of her unauthorized use of its technology.

== Cyborgirl ==
- First appearance: Wonder Woman (vol. 2) #179 (May 2002)
- Created by: Phil Jimenez; Roy Allan Martinez
- Species: Cyborg
- Abilities: Cybernetic enhancement; Superhuman durability; Superhuman speed; Superhuman agility; Superhuman reflexes; Superhuman stamina; Superhuman strength; Enhanced senses; Energy projection
- Further reading: Cyborgirl at the Grand Comics Database

Cyborgirl is a character appearing in American comic books published by DC Comics.

LeTonya Charles was a young woman who had destroyed her body with the drug Tar, but was granted a second chance when her aunt, Sarah Charles, one of the scientists who helped repair Cyborg, saved her with powerful cybernetic implants. Rather than use her newfound gifts for good, LeTonya chose to focus on personal gain as Cyborgirl. She became a member of Villainy, Inc., teaming up with several seasoned Wonder Woman villains. She and her teammates tried to overthrow Skartaris, but were stopped by Wonder Woman.

When the government rounded up villains and sent them to the planet Salvation, she handed herself over to the Justice League to avoid being exiled. Soon after, Cyborgirl joined the Cyborg Revenge Squad and was one of several such beings to wage an attack against Victor Stone at S.T.A.R. Labs. Stone avoided Cyborgirl's electromagnetic attack, but succeeded in defeating her through sheer force.

=== Powers and abilities of Cyborgirl ===
Because of the implants that her aunt gave her, Cyborgirl has the same powers as Cyborg. These include superhuman strength, durability, speed, stamina, senses, and energy projection.

=== Cyborgirl in other media ===
- When Justice League was pitched to the Kids' WB network, the lineup of the titular group originally included Robin, Impulse, and an original character described as a teenage female version of Cyborg (Cyborgirl or Natasha Irons). The promo is viewable on the fourth disc of the Justice League Season One boxed set.
- A character based on Cyborgirl named Laura Washington / Cyber-Woman appears in the Arrowverse crossover "Invasion!", portrayed by Erica Luttrell. This version is a doctor who artificially augmented herself using technology stolen from Van Horn Industries.

== Cyclone Kids ==
The Cyclone Kids are two characters appearing in American comic books published by DC Comics.

Amelia "Sisty" Hunkel is the daughter of Ma Hunkel. Mortimer "Dinky" Jibbet is the younger brother of Scribbly Jibbet and Ma Hunkel's neighbor. When Ma operated as Red Tornado, Sisty and Dinky became her sidekicks known as the Cyclone Kids.

Later on in their life, Sisty and Dinky got married and joined up with Old Justice. In addition, they have a niece who operates as Cyclone.
