= Manchester Black =

- Manchester Black in Action Comics #775, art by Doug Mahnke.

Publication information
- Publisher: DC Comics
- First appearance: Action Comics #775 (March 2001)
- Created by: Joe Kelly; Doug Mahnke

In-story information
- Alter ego: Manchester Black
- Species: Metahuman
- Team affiliations: The Elite; Suicide Squad; S.T.A.R. Labs; The Authority
- Abilities: Telekinesis; Mind reading; Mind control; Thought projection; Illusion generation; Dream manipulation; Memory manipulation; Reality manipulation; Lie detection

Manchester Black is a character in American comic books published by DC Comics, in particular those featuring Superman. He was created by Joe Kelly and Doug Mahnke in Action Comics #775 (March 2001). Introduced as an antihero, the character later becomes a supervillain.

David Ajala portrays Manchester Black in Supergirl.

== Fictional character biography ==
Manchester Black is a ruthless vigilante who leads a crime fighting team called the Elite. Other than his thick English accent, his notorious Union Jack tattoo, and a few snippets he told about his life, little is known about him. What is known includes insinuations that he was physically abused by his parents while growing up and has a hatred for people with "high moral concepts" who feel they are better than people like Black, who would do anything to survive. This hatred included superheroes who would only turn over captured villains to the police instead of killing them, which was the only way Manchester and the Elite felt villains could be dealt with.

Black first appears as the leader of the Elite, who gain worldwide popularity for their pragmatic approach of killing superpowered threats rather than simply neutralising them (leaving them free to escape and cause more damage). As they continue their activities, Superman opposes their cynical methods, believing that they are crossing a moral line doing so.

Eventually, Black and Superman decide to have a faceoff to settle their differences, their battlefield being Io, the moon of Jupiter. Superman is seemingly beaten by the Elite, with Black using his psychic powers to bring Superman close to a stroke by bursting blood vessels in his brain before his teammates (Coldcast, Menagerie, and Hat) finish him off with a sizeable explosion.

Despite this, Superman survives, and claiming that he now sees the value of Black's methodology, he seemingly kills all of the Elite in retaliation except Black. As Black prepares to attack Superman, he discovers that his powers have been completely neutralised; Superman had used his heat vision, focused through Black's retinas, as a scalpel and (temporarily) lobotomised the part of his brain controlling his abilities. Superman reveals that he hadn't actually killed the Elite, but had dispatched them in such a way as to demonstrate exactly why Black's methods were flawed and immoral; after this, he takes a furious, sobbing Black into custody.

Black is taken into custody, and his mental powers are restored over the next several months. In his next appearance during the Our Worlds at War storyline, Black is hired to lead a new Suicide Squad, consisting of Chemo, Plasmus, Shrapnel, Mongul, and Steel, to combat Imperiex. In the 2002 storyline Ending Battle, Black sends dozens of supervillains to attack Superman after learning his secret identity. Superman manages to hold the villains back, but learns that Black has apparently killed Lois Lane. Superman considers killing Black, but resists and decides to imprison him instead. Distraught at the thought that he has become a supervillain, Black commits suicide.

=== The New 52 ===
Manchester Black is resurrected following The New 52 continuity reboot and depicted as an executive at S.T.A.R. Labs. Black created Algorithm, an artificial intelligence that commits acts of terrorism throughout New York City to lure the Teen Titans to S.T.A.R. Labs, where he stages an attack against himself to be saved by the Titans and gain their trust. He then proposes a partnership; suspicious of Black's intentions, Red Robin agrees to it, but sends Beast Boy to investigate him.

In 2016, DC Comics implemented a relaunch of its books called DC Rebirth, which restored its continuity to a form much as it was prior to The New 52. Black is restored to his original look and powers, though his hair is black rather than purple. Black takes Jon Kent, the young Superboy, hostage and removes his powers, forcing him to watch images of his parents fighting off his creatures and suffering. Before Black can attack the Kents further, Jon's friend Kathy Branden uses her powers to create telepathic feedback, trapping Black's consciousness in the body of a cow.

Some time later, a restored Black is cornered by the authorities for various crimes likely stemming from improper use of his powers at his flat in South London. Black nearly escapes through use of his telepathy before he is shot in the back by a sniper and taken into custody by Superman. Awakening in the Fortress of Solitude, Black finds himself in a strange device healing his wounds and restoring his mobility as Superman asks for his help in saving the world. While Black initially rejects this request, he decides to put aside his combative past with Superman and help him reform the Authority to save the world before it is too late.

Following the liberation of Warworld, Black is revealed to have been an informant for Lex Luthor, though his adventures with Superman ultimately changed his allegiances. Black taunts Luthor, claiming that while Luthor is obsessed with Superman, Superman rarely thought of or mentioned Luthor while on Warworld. Angered, Luthor tortures Black and uses his abilities to wipe the knowledge of Superman's identity from most of Earth's population, killing him in the process. Black returns in an astral form and tricks Superboy-Prime into punching the fabric of reality, bringing him back to life.

== Powers and abilities ==
Black is a powerful telekinetic and telepath. He can create detailed illusions on a vast scale, erase memories, and could telepathically control thousands of minds at the same time. While controlling Bizarro and Silver Banshee, he was able to temporarily grant them enough sanity to enable them to communicate and form plans.

== In other media ==
David Ajala as Manchester "Ches" Black in Supergirl.

- Manchester Black appears in Supergirl, portrayed by David Ajala. This version is a Black British man who fell in love with an Empath from Ikthanol named Fiona Byrne. After the Children of Liberty capture and kill Byrne, Black seeks revenge by forming the Elite and using a Martian artifact called the Staff of H'ronmeer that grants telepathic powers, only to be killed by Martian Manhunter.
- Manchester Black appears in Superman vs. The Elite, voiced by Robin Atkin Downes as an adult and Grey DeLisle as a child.
- Manchester Black appears as an unlockable playable character in Lego Batman 3: Beyond Gotham, voiced again by Robin Atkin Downes.
- Manchester Black appears as a character summon in Scribblenauts Unmasked: A DC Comics Adventure.

== Collected editions ==
Some of Black's appearances have been reprinted in trade paperbacks:

- Justice League Elite (reprints: Action Comics #775, JLA #100, JLA Secret Files 2004 (lead story), and Justice League Elite #1-4, tpb, 208 pages, 2005, Titan ISBN 1-84576-191-X DC, ISBN 1-4012-0481-3)
- Superman: Ending Battle (reprints 2002's Superman (1986 series) #186-87, Adventures Of Superman #608-09, Superman: Man Of Steel #130-31, and Action Comics #795-96, tpb, 192 pages, 2009, DC, ISBN 1-4012-2259-5)
