= Dawn of DC =

2023 DC Comics relaunch event

- Front and back covers of Dawn of DC Primer Special Edition (May 2023) #1 by Jeff Spokes

Publication information
- Publisher: DC Comics
- Genre: Superhero
- Publication date: January 2023 – October 2024
- Main character: DC Universe

Creative team
- Written by: Various
- Artist: Various

Dawn of DC is a 2023 publishing initiative by the American comic book publisher DC Comics of its entire line of ongoing monthly superhero comic book titles. Following the events of the 2022 crossover storylines "Dark Crisis on Infinite Earths" and "Lazarus Planet", DC Comics started the Dawn of DC line in January 2023 with Action Comics #1051 and concluded with Absolute Power #4.

The initiative succeeds the Infinite Frontier line, and is itself succeeded by the DC All In initiative spearheaded by writers Joshua Williamson and Scott Snyder in October 2024.

== Publication history ==
DC Comics first announced the launch of Dawn of DC in November 2022. DC Publisher & Chief Creative Officer Jim Lee described that the "Dawn of DC is one of our most ambitious initiatives ever and is a chance for us to tell bigger and bolder stories across our line".

Unlike The New 52 or DC Rebirth where all titles were relaunched with new number one issues being released in a short period, Dawn Of DC instead is a yearlong storytelling initiative consisting of a slow rollout of new titles releasing throughout the year. Other books from prior to Dawn of DC, such as the Justice Society of America book that is being written by Geoff Johns as a part of The New Golden Age, will converge to the initiative. Action Comics by Phillip Kennedy Johnson, Batman by Chip Zdarsky, Catwoman by Tini Howard, Nightwing by Tom Taylor and Harley Quinn by Tini Howard are books which started prior to Dawn of DC and are now part of this initiative.

The first issue to be released under the Dawn of DC banner was Action Comics #1051 on January 24, 2023, with various others following suit thereafter. The tone for many of the books in Dawn of DC was inspired by Mark Waid and Dan Mora's Batman/Superman: World's Finest, along with Tom Taylor's Nightwing series. Along with the tone, the series are more interconnected and intertwined with one another, helping to enhance the shared universe. What happens in one series is directly going to affect another. Tom King commented that "Superman is going to have an impact on Wonder Woman, and what happens in Batman is going to impact Superman. The world is cohesive, not separated".

In May 2023, the ongoing series Batman celebrated its 900th issue along with being the first issue of Batman to be officially branded in Dawn of DC, even though the previous arcs were set after the events of Dark Crisis. The next issue went back to its previous numbering with #136 but was the first DC title to include legacy numbering with #901. In June 2023, both Wonder Woman and The Flash celebrated their 800th issues along with marking their first series in Dawn of DC. Following issue #800 both series were relaunched in September, starting from issue #1 with new creative teams.

In July and August 2023, the Knight Terrors event, headed by Joshua Williamson with multiple tie-in mini-series by various creative teams, took over the publishing line.

After the end of Knight Terrors, DC Comics published a Batman and Catwoman crossover titled Batman/Catwoman: The Gotham War, headlined by Chip Zdarsky and Tini Howard. This crossover takes place within the main Batman and Catwoman series, with their respective artists drawing these issues. Additionally, a Red Hood-centric two-issue tie-in miniseries, Batman/Catwoman: The Gotham War: Red Hood, was written by Matthew Rosenberg and drawn by Nikola Čižmešija. This crossover took place from August 2023 to October of the same year.

In October 2023, Superman with the 7th issue of its current volume celebrated its (legacy) 850th issue in an oversized special.

Titans: Beast World, the Titans-centric event started in November 2023, with the main series being written by Tom Taylor featuring art by Ivan Reis, Danny Miki and Lucas Meyer. The event tied in to both Titans and Nightwing, also written by Taylor.

At New York Comic Con 2024, DC Comics announced the "Superman Superstars" initiative occurring in the Action Comics series. The initiative began in January 2024 with creators Jason Aaron and John Timms for the story arc I, Bizarro in Action Comics #1061-1063. Following I, Bizarro, Joshua Williamson, Rafa Sandoval and Miguel Mendoca took over for the next story arc, House of Brainiac, a cross-over between Superman and Action Comics from April to June 2024. The next team to take over the initiative is Gail Simone and Eddy Barrows in #1067-1069 with the story Superman and the Challenge from the Stars.

In July 2024, DC comics published the next company-wide summer event, Absolute Power written by Mark Waid and drawn by Dan Mora. The event consists of the titular four-issue mini-series. The event uses threads built up in series published throughout Dawn of DC, including the character of Failsafe from the events of the Batman series written by Chip Zdarsky with art by Jorge Jimenez, from Batman (vol. 3) #125–130 and #144-148. Along with the Brainiac Queen, a new character created by Brainiac introduced during the events of House of Brainiac. The event lasted from July to October 2024, with the effects of the event leading into the new DC publishing initiative, DC All In, from Scott Snyder and Joshua Williamson.

== Plot ==
Throughout the runs of Dawn of DC, Amanda Waller attempts to rid the world of all metahumans, good or bad, eventually succeeding, taking away every super-powered being's power and turning the world against all super-heroic activities

== Overarching narrative ==
With the end of Dark Crisis on Infinite Earths, the Justice League was brought back from their supposed deaths. Amanda Waller, now inspired by this act, works under the Light to take action against all metahumans, both heroes and villains alike. In The Dawn of DC Primer #1, Waller tasks Peacemaker and Peacewrecker, her new right hands, with acquiring the Helmet of Hate from Lazarus Island. Whilst Peacemaker is off on his mission, Waller meets with a group of villains and gave them a new task, to kill the superheroes.

A new villain, Insomnia, fueled by his hatred of the Justice League and the superhero community (as a result of an attack by a group of evil Batmen which led to the deaths of his family) puts the entire world to sleep. He did this in order to find a mysterious object, the Nightmare Stone. After getting the Nightmare Stone, Insomnia brings the nightmares of the hero community to life. Following these events in "Knight Terrors", the world's opinion of the Justice League changes for the worse. Waller steals the Nightmare Stone through all of the chaos and a mysterious figure (later revealed to be one of the missing pieces of Raven's soul) combines the stone with the Helmet of Hate in order to transform into Doctor Hate. Waller then tells Hate to target the Titans now that the Justice League are feared by the world.

During the Necrostar incident, Waller and Peacemaker meet with the President of the United States and ask him to activate the emergency Bureau of Sovereignty in order to contain the threat. In the aftermath, Waller takes control of the Hall of Justice by framing the Titans for Beast Boy's invasion; and Hate has trapped Raven in her soul gem.

Waller meets with the Council of Light, which turns out to be multiple versions of Brainiac. It is revealed that Brainiac teleported Waller and her Suicide Squad when they fought the Crime Syndicate before Dark Crisis. Waller is angry that Brainiac used her and warns him to stay out of her way.

Reviving Time Commander to rebuild Failsafe, and grooming a reset Brainiac Queen to her ideology, Waller sets to work to remove all metahumans permanently.

== Changes to the DC Universe ==
Following the events of the Dark Crisis, the Justice League, as a team, has gone onto a long term hiatus with the Titans, led by Nightwing, becoming the DC universe's premier superhero team. The Titans are now located in Blüdhaven with their new Titans Tower being rebuilt over an old prison, which was destroyed following a prison breakout, led by the villain Heartless. The villain Brother Blood has now changed public perception for himself and his cult, the Church of Blood now rebranded as the Church of Eternity. He is promoting this new change with the support of Teen Titans member Garth/Tempest. Garth rejected the offer to join this new Titans team in support of another who has the ability to be someone "who can make a real difference".

Following the events of "Dark Crisis", "Warworld Saga", "Lazarus Planet" and Action Comics #1050, a major change in the status quo occurred for the Superfamily. This includes the expansion of the Superman family and mythos with the addition of the Super Twins, Osul and Otho-Ra; Jon Kent now has new powers which mirror those of the Electric Blue Superman from the 1990s; and Lex Luthor uses Manchester Black's abilities to erase the public's knowledge of Superman's secret identity. Luthor is now in prison and has handed over the reins of LexCorp to Superman, with the company being renamed to Supercorp and having a new goal of helping Superman. Lois Lane also serves as the current editor-in-chief of the Daily Planet, with Perry White being on a sabbatical. Steelworks was founded by John Henry Irons / Steel to bring forth Metropolis into becoming the City of Tomorrow. Power Girl gains telepathic abilities due to the Lazarus Storm, and now goes by the name Paige. Jimmy Olsen now has a new love interest in the form of ex-supervillain Silver Banshee. Silver Banshee previously damaged Superman's hearing so he no longer has super-hearing, having done so after being threatened by a new group of evil mad scientist supervillains. These scientists have been physically changing Superman's rogues, making them more deadly and powerful.

Following the events of "Lazarus Planet", the Doom Patrol, led by the Chief, a new personality of Crazy Jane, have a new mission statement: with a rise in the metahuman population, their goal is to help, protect and offer safe haven, for the world's metahumans. Along with a new mission, the Doom Patrol have a new base called the Shelter, based out of an old missile silo, to provide shelter to new metahumans and allow them to improve their abilities. The Doom Patrol are joined by two new metahumans - Beast Girl and Degenerate.

During Dark Crisis, the superhero Oliver Queen / Green Arrow disappeared and did not return with the rest of the Justice League. This disappearance is investigated by the other members of the Arrow Family including Dinah Lance / Black Canary, Roy Harper / Arsenal and Connor Hawke / Green Arrow. Lian Harper, who died in the 2009 story Cry for Justice, is now back alive and well, reunited with her father, Roy Harper, and has rejoined the Arrow family. Connor ends up traveling to the future and meeting the Legion of Super-Heroes. For some unknown reason, the Green Arrow family can no longer be reunited in its entirety for in the future they caused a "Great Disaster".

Following "Lazarus Planet", magic in the DC Universe now works differently causing Billy Batson to use a new name, The Captain, as whenever he says "Shazam!", it triggers his transformation to occur. Other than Mary Marvel, the rest of the Shazam Family no longer has powers. Through the powers of Hippolyta, the meaning of "Shazam!" for Mary Marvel stands for new deities; Selene, Hippolyta, Artemis, Zephyrus, Aurora, and Minerva, though her powers appear to be the same.

The Guardians of the Universe have mysteriously disappeared, and in their place, the United Planets have taken control of the Green Lantern Corps. The United Planets claim that Sector 2814 (Earth) is a liability to the universe and reassign all Green Lanterns to other sectors across the universe. Furious at this change, Hal Jordan quit the Green Lantern Corps and returned to Earth. Carol Ferris, Hal Jordan's long time romantic interest has moved on from Hal and now has a new fiance. John Stewart retires from the Green Lantern Corps and now lives on Earth with his mother.

== Titles ==
Key

Color	Meaning
	Title continued into DC All In.

=== Ongoing series ===
Title	Issues	Creative teams (excluding back-ups) (Note: For additional creative team information, see each title's individual article.)			Debut date	Conclusion Date
Title	Issues	Writer(s)	Artist(s)	Colorist(s)	Debut date	Conclusion Date
Action Comics	#1051–1069	Phillip Kennedy Johnson; Jason Aaron; Joshua Williamson; Gail Simone	Rafa Sandoval; John Timms; Miguel Mendonca; Eddy Barrows	Matt Herms; Rex Lokus; Alejandro Sánchez	January 24, 2023	September 25, 2024
Catwoman (vol. 5) (Note: Although the story arc started in Catwoman (vol. 5) #51, the Dawn of DC banner was not added until #52.)	#52–68	Tini Howard	Sami Basri; Nico Leon; Stefano Raffaele	Veronic Gandini	February 21, 2023	September 18, 2024
Superman (vol. 6)	#1–18	Joshua Williamson	Jamal Campbell; Gleb Melnikov; David Baldeón; Bruno Redondo	Jamal Campbell; Alejandro Sánchez; Adriano Lucas	February 21, 2023	September 18, 2024
Nightwing (vol. 4) (Note: Although the story arc started in Nightwing (vol. 4) #101, the Dawn of DC banner was not added until #102.)	#102–118	Tom Taylor	Travis Moore; Bruno Redondo; Stephen Byrne	Adriano Lucas	March 21, 2023	September 18, 2024
Harley Quinn (vol. 4)	#28–43	Tini Howard	Sweeny Boo		March 28, 2023	September 25, 2024
Green Arrow (vol. 7)	#1–16	Joshua Williamson	Sean Izaakse; Phil Hester	Romulo Fajardo Jr.	April 25, 2023	September 25, 2024
Batman (vol. 3) (Note: Although the Chip Zdarsky run of Batman started in Batman (vol. 3) #125, with all the events taking place after Dark Crisis, the Dawn of DC banner was not added until #135.)	#135–152	Chip Zdarsky	Mike Hawthorne; Jorge Jiménez; Belen Ortega	Tomeu Morey	May 2, 2023	September 4, 2024
Shazam! (vol. 5)	#1–15	Mark Waid; Josie Campbell	Dan Mora; Emanuela Lupacchino	Alejandro Sánchez; Trish Mulvihill	May 2, 2023	September 4, 2024
Green Lantern (vol. 7)	#1–15	Jeremy Adams	Xermánico	Romulo Fajardo Jr.	May 9, 2023	September 11, 2024
Titans (vol. 4)	#1–15	Tom Taylor	Nicola Scott; Travis Moore; Lucas Meyer	Annette Kwok; Tamra Bonvillain; Adriano Lucas	May 16, 2023	September 18, 2024
Batman: The Brave and the Bold (Note: Though the series does not include the Dawn of DC banner, these titles were advertised to be in the Dawn of DC or have stories which occur during or have an effect in the Dawn of DC)	#1–20	Various			May 16, 2023	December 26, 2024 (Note: Despite ending after the beginning of All In, it doesn't fold into the All In banner.)
Poison Ivy	#13–25	G. Willow Wilson	Marcio Takara; Luana Vecchio; Haining	Arif Prianto; Luana Vecchio	June 6, 2023	September 25, 2024
The Penguin	#1–12	Tom King	Rafael de Latorre	Marcelo Maiolo	August 22, 2023	July 24, 2024
Birds of Prey (vol. 5)	#1–13	Kelly Thompson	Leonardo Romero; Javier Pina; Gavin Guidry	Jordie Bellaire	September 5, 2023	September 4, 2024
Blue Beetle (vol. 10)	#1–11	Josh Trujillo	Adrian Gutiérrez	Wil Quintana	September 5, 2023	July 3, 2024
Batman and Robin (vol. 3)	#1–13	Joshua Williamson	Simone di Meo		September 12, 2023	September 11, 2024
Green Lantern: War Journal	#1–12	Philip Kennedy Johnson	Montos	Adriana Lucas	September 19, 2023	August 21, 2024
Wonder Woman (vol. 6)	#1–13	Tom King	Daniel Sampere	Tomeu Morey	September 19, 2023	September 18, 2024
The Flash (vol. 6)	#1–13	Simon Spurrier	Mike Deodato, Jr.	Trish Mulvihill	September 26, 2023	September 25, 2024
Power Girl (vol. 3)	#1–13	Leah Williams	Eduardo Pansica	Romulo Fajardo Jr.	September 26, 2023	September 25, 2024

=== Limited series ===
Title	Issues	Creative teams (excluding back ups)			Debut date	Conclusion date
Title	Issues	Writer(s)	Artist(s)	Colorist(s)	Debut date	Conclusion date
Adventures of Superman: Jon Kent	#1–6	Tom Taylor	Clayton Henry; Darick Robertson	Jordie Bellaire	March 7, 2023	August 1, 2023
Unstoppable Doom Patrol	#1–7	Dennis Culver	Chris Burnham; David Lafuente	Brian Reber	March 28, 2023	October 24, 2023
Superboy: The Man of Tomorrow	#1–6	Kenny Porter	Jahnoy Lindsay		April 18, 2023	September 19, 2023
Spirit World (vol. 2) (Note: Part of the "We Are Legends" banner.)	#1–6	Alyssa Wong	Haining		May 9, 2023	October 31, 2023
Cyborg (vol. 3)	#1–6	Morgan Hampton	Tom Raney	Michael Atiyeh	May 16, 2023	December 19, 2023
The Vigil	#1–6	Ram V	Lalit Kumar Sharma	Rain Beredo	May 16, 2023	October 17, 2023
City Boy	#1–6	Greg Pak	Minkyu Jung	Sunny Gho	May 23, 2023	November 7, 2023
Justice Society of America (vol. 4) (Note: Also part of The New Golden Age, which started in November of 2022, headlined by Geoff Johns.)	#6-12	Geoff Johns	Mikel Janín; Jerry Ordway	Jordie Bellaire	May 23, 2023	May 23, 2023
Steelworks	#1–6	Michael Dorn	Sami Basri	Andrew Dalhouse	June 6, 2023	November 28, 2023
Hawkgirl (vol. 2)	#1–6	Jadzia Axelrod	Amancay Nahuelpan	Adriano Lucas	July 18, 2023	December 19, 2023
Tales of the Titans (Note: Though the series does not include the Dawn of DC banner, these titles were advertised to be in the Dawn of DC or have stories which occur during or have an effect in the Dawn of DC)	#1–4	Various			July 18, 2023	October 24, 2023
Fire & Ice: Welcome to Smallville	#1–6	Joanne Starer	Natacha Bustos	Tamra Bonvillain	September 5, 2023	February 6, 2024
Wesley Dodds: The Sandman	#1–6	Robert Venditti	Riley Rossmo	Ivan Plascencia	October 10, 2023	March 12, 2024
Jay Garrick: The Flash	#1–6	Jeremy Adams	Diego Olortegui	Luis Guerrero	October 17, 2023	March 19, 2024
Alan Scott: The Green Lantern	#1–6	Tim Sheridan	Cian Tormey	Matt Herms	October 24, 2023	March 26, 2024
Amazons Attack (vol. 2)	#1–6	Josie Campbell	Vasco Georgiev	Alex Guimarães	October 24, 2023	March 26, 2024
Outsiders (vol. 5)	#1–11	Collin Kelly & Jackson Lanzing	Robert Casey	Valentina Taddeo	November 14, 2023	September 11, 2024
Speed Force (vol. 2)	#1–6	Jarrett Williams	Daniele Di Nicuolo	Andrew Dalhouse	November 14, 2023	April 9, 2024
Red Hood: The Hill	#1–6	Shawn Martinbrough	Sanford Greene	Matt Herms	February 13, 2024	July 31, 2024
Kneel Before Zod	#1–8	Joe Casey	Dan McDaid	David Baron	January 2, 2024	August 7, 2024
Sinister Sons	#1–6	Peter Tomasi	David Lafuente	Tamra Bonvillain	February 13, 2024	July 10, 2024
Suicide Squad: Dream Team	#1–4	Nicole Maines	Eddy Barrows	Adriano Lucas	March 12, 2024	June 11, 2024

=== One-shots ===
Title	Creative team			Release date
Title	Writer	Artist(s)	Colorist(s)	Release date
Dawn of DC We Are Legends Special Edition #1	Greg Pak; Ram V Alyssa Wong	Minkyu Jung; Lalit Kumar Sharma; Haining	Sunny Gho; Romulo Fajardo Jr. Haining	May 2, 2023
Dawn of DC Knight Terrors Free Comic Book Day Special Edition #1	Joshua Williamson	Chris Bachalo; Howard Porter	Chris Bachalo; Brad Anderson	May 6, 2023
The Dawn of DC Primer #1	Joshua Williamson	Leandro Fernandez	Daniela Miwa	May 16, 2023
Power Girl Special #1	Leah Williams	Marguerite Sauvage		May 30, 2023
Supergirl Special #1	Mariko Tamaki	Skylar Patridge	Marissa Louise	October 31, 2023
Trinity Special #1	Tom King	Daniel Sampere; Belén Ortega	Tomeu Morey; Alejandro Sánchez	January 30, 2024

=== Events ===
Title	Issues	Creative team			Debut date	Conclusion date
Title	Issues	Writer(s)	Artist(s)	Colorist(s)	Debut date	Conclusion date
Knight Terrors
Knight Terrors: First Blood #1 (Note: That non-italicized titles for Knight Terrors are the main issues.)	#1	Joshua Williamson	Howard Porter	Brad Anderson	July 4, 2023	
Knight Terrors: Batman	#1–2	Joshua Williamson	Guillem March	Tomeu Morey	July 4, 2023	August 1, 2023
Knight Terrors: Black Adam	#1–2	Jeremy Haun		Nick Filardi	July 4, 2023	August 1, 2023
Knight Terrors: Poison Ivy	#1–2	G. Willow Wilson	Atagun Ilhan	Arif Prianto	July 4, 2023	August 1, 2023
Knight Terrors: Ravager	#1–2	Ed Brisson	Dexter Soy	Veronica Gandini	July 4, 2023	August 1, 2023
Knight Terrors: The Joker	#1–2	Matthew Rosenberg	Stefano Raffaele	Romulo Fajardo Jr.	July 4, 2023	August 1, 2023
Knight Terrors	#1–4	Joshua Williamson	Giuseppe Camuncoli; Stefano Nesi; Caspar Wijngaard	Tomeu Morey	July 11, 2023	August 22, 2023
Knight Terrors: Green Lantern	#1–2	Jeremy Adams	Eduardo Pansica	Luis Guerrero	July 11, 2023	August 8, 2023
Knight Terrors: Robin	#1–2	Kenny Porter	Miguel Mendonça	Adriano Lucas	July 11, 2023	August 8, 2023
Knight Terrors: Shazam	#1–2	Mark Waid	Roger Cruz	Arif Prianto	July 11, 2023	August 8, 2023
Knight Terrors: The Flash	#1–2	Alex Paknadel	Daniel Bayliss	Igor Monti	July 11, 2023	August 8, 2023
Knight Terrors: Zatanna	#1–2	Dennis Culver	David Baldeon	Rain Beredo	July 11, 2023	August 8, 2023
Knight Terrors: Catwoman	#1–2	Tini Howard	Leila Leiz	Marissa Louise	July 18, 2023	August 15, 2023
Knight Terrors: Nightwing	#1–2	Becky Cloonan; Michael W. Conrad	Daniele Di Nicuolo	Adriano Lucas	July 18, 2023	August 15, 2023
Knight Terrors: Punchline	#1–2	Danny Lore	Lucas Meyer	Alex Guimarães	July 18, 2023	August 15, 2023
Knight Terrors: Superman	#1–2	Joshua Williamson	Tom Reilly	Nathan Fairbairn	July 18, 2023	August 15, 2023
Knight Terrors: Wonder Woman	#1–2	Josie Campbell	Juan Ferreyra		July 18, 2023	August 15, 2023
Knight Terrors: Action Comics	#1–2	Leah Williams; Phillip Kennedy Johnson	Vasco Georgiev; Mico Suayan	Alex Guimarães; Romulo Fajardo Jr.	July 25, 2023	August 22, 2023
Knight Terrors: Angel Breaker	#1–2	Tim Seeley	Acky Bright	Brian Reber	July 25, 2023	August 22, 2023
Knight Terrors: Detective Comics	#1–2	Dan Watters	Riccardo Federici	Brad Anderson	July 25, 2023	August 22, 2023
Knight Terrors: Harley Quinn	#1–2	Tini Howard	Hayden Sherman	Triona Farrell	July 25, 2023	August 22, 2023
Knight Terrors: Titans	#1–2	Andrew Constant	Scott Godlewski	Ryan Cody	July 25, 2023	August 22, 2023
Knight Terrors: Night's End #1	#1	Joshua Williamson	Howard Porter; Giuseppe Camuncoli; Trevor Hairsine	Rain Beredo; Frank Martin	August 29, 2023	
Batman/Catwoman: Gotham War
Batman/Catwoman: The Gotham War – Battle Lines	#1	Chip Zdarsky; Tini Howard	Mike Hawthorne; Adriano Di Benedetto	Tomeu Morey	August 29, 2023	
Batman (vol. 3)	#137–138	Chip Zdarsky	Jorge Jimenez	Tomeu Morey	September 5, 2023	October 3, 2023
Catwoman (vol. 5)	#57–58	Tini Howard	Nico Leon	Veronica Gandini	September 19, 2023	October 17, 2023
Batman/Catwoman: The Gotham War: Red Hood	#1–2	Matthew Rosenberg	Nikola Čižmešija	Rex Lokus	September 26, 2023	October 24, 2023
Batman/Catwoman: The Gotham War – Scorched Earth	#1	Chip Zdarsky; Tini Howard	Mike Hawthorne; Adriano Di Benedetto	Romulo Fajardo Jr.	October 31, 2023	
Titans: Beast World
Tale of the Titans	#4	Andrew Constant	Brandt & Stein	Lee Loughridge	October 24, 2023	
Titans Beast World: Evolution (Note: One-shot collecting Teen Titans (vol. 1) #5, Tales of the New Teen Titans #3, and a story from Action Comics #1051.)	#1	Bob Haney; Marv Wolfman; Leah Williams	Bill Molno; George Pérez; Marguerite Sauvage	Bill Molno; Adrienne Roy; Marguerite Sauvage	November 21, 2023	
Titans: Beast World	#1–6	Tom Taylor	Ivan Reis; Lucas Meyer	Brad Anderson; Romulo Fajardo Jr.	November 28, 2023	January 30, 2024
Titans (vol. 4)	#6–7	Tom Taylor	Nicola Scott; Travis Moore; Stephen Segovia	Annette Kwok; Tamra Bonvillain	December 26, 2023	January 16, 2024
Titans: Beast World: Waller Rising	#1	Chuck Brown	Keron Grant		December 5, 2023	
Titans: Beast World Tour: Metropolis	#1	Nicole Maines; Joshua Williamson; Dan Jurgens; Zipporah Smith	Fico Ossio; Anthony Marques; Edwin Galmon	Luis Guerrero; Pete Pantazis; Edwin Galmon	December 5, 2023	
Titans: Beast World Tour: Gotham	#1	Chip Zdarsky; Grace Ellis; Gretchen Felker-Martin; Sam Maggs; Kyle Starks	Miguel Mendonça; Daniel Hillyard; Ivan Shavrin; PJ Holden; Kelley Jones	Mike Spicer; Rico Renzi; Ivan Shavrin; PJ Holden; José Villarrubia	December 12, 2023	
Titans: Beast World Tour: Central City	#1	Si Spurrier; Jarrett Williams; Alex Paknadel; A.L. Kaplan	Scott Koblish; George Kambadais; Serg Acuña; A.L. Kaplan	Hi-Fi; Matt Herms; A.L. Kaplan	December 19, 2023	
Titans: Beast World Tour: Atlantis	#1	Sina Grace; Frank Tieri; Meghan Fitzmartin	Riccardo Federici; Valentine De Landro; Maria Laura Sanapo	Lee Loughridge; Marissa Louise; Michael Atiyeh	January 2, 2024	
Titans: Beast World Tour: Star City	#1	Joshua Williamson; Ryan Parrott; Robert Venditti; Ted Brandt	Jamal Campbell; Roger Cruz; Gavin Guidry; Ro Stein	Adriano Lucas; Alex Gumiaraes	January 23, 2024	
House of Brainiac
Action Comics	#1064–1066	Joshua Williamson	Rafa Sandoval	Alejandro Sanchez	April 9, 2024	June 25th, 2024
Green Lantern (vol. 7)	#10–12	Jeremy Adams	Kevin Maguire	Romulo Fajardo Jr.	April 9, 2024	June 11th, 2024
Superman (vol. 6)	#13–15	Joshua Williamson	Rafa Sandoval	Alejandro Sanchez	April 16, 2024	June 25th, 2024
Power Girl (vol. 3)	#8–10	Leah Williams	Eduardo Pansica	Romulo Fajardo Jr.	April 23, 2024	June 25th, 2024
Superman: House of Brainiac Special	#1	Joshua Williamson; Mark Russell	Edwin Galmon; Steve Pugh	Edwin Galmon; Jordie Bellaire; Rex Lokus	April 30, 2024	
Absolute Power
Suicide Squad: Dream Team	#1–4	Nicole Maines	Eddy Barrows Eber Ferreira	Adriano Lucas	March 12, 2024	June 11, 2024
Free Comic Book Day 2024: Absolute Power Special Edition	#1	Mark Waid	Miekl Janín	Patricia Mulvihill	May 5, 2024	
Absolute Power: Ground Zero	#1	Nicole Maines Mark Waid Joshua Williamson Chip Zdarsky	V. Ken Marion Gleb Melnikov Skylar Patridge	Patricio Delpeche	June 25, 2024	
Absolute Power	#1–4	Mark Waid	Dan Mora	Alejandro Sánchez	July 3, 2024	October 2, 2024
Absolute Power: Task Force VII	#1–7	Jeremy Adams John Layman Pornsak Pichetshote Alex Paknadel Dan Watters Leah Williams Stephanie Williams	Khary Randolph Max Raynor Claire Roe Pete Woods Marco Santucci Caitlin Yarsky	Alex Guimarães	July 10, 2024	September 25, 2024
Absolute Power: Origins	#1–3	John Ridley	Alitha Martinez	Andrew Dalhouse	July 24, 2024	September 25, 2024
Absolute Power: Super Son	#1	Sina Grace Nicole Maines	Travis Mercer John Timms	Hi-Fi Rex Lokus	September 18, 2024	

== See also ==
- List of current DC Comics publications
