= Gotham War =

Comic book storyline

- Publisher: DC Comics
- Publication date: August – October 2023
- Genre: Superhero
Title(s)
see #Reading order
- Main character(s): Batman; Catwoman; Damian Wayne; Jason Todd; Dick Grayson; Tim Drake; Vandal Savage

Creative team
- Writer(s): Chip Zdarsky, Tini Howard
- Artist(s): Jorge Jiménez, Nico DeLeon, Mike Hawthorne
- Letterer(s): Lucas Gattoni, Clayton Cowles, Steve Wands,
- Colorist(s): Mike Spicer, Romulo Fajardo Jr., Veronica Gandini
- Editor: Ben Abernathy

"Gotham War" is an eight-issue comic book crossover storyline published by the comic book publishing company DC Comics in late 2023, featuring Batman and his family dealing with Catwoman's new idea in taking down crime. Primarily written by Chip Zdarsky and Tini Howard, the arc is their first major arc on Batman and Catwoman in Dawn of DC. The main story received poor reviews from critics, with critics criticizing the inconsistent art, story, and writing for Catwoman.

== Publication history ==
In May 2023, DC Comics announced "Gotham War" to bridge the gap between the Batman and Catwoman series. The events in this story also take place after "Knight Terrors".

== Plot ==
=== Prelude ===
After Failsafe transports Batman to an alternate universe, he meets an alternate version of Catwoman who questions whether Batman's method of fighting crime is effective. During this adventure, Batman reawakens his Zur-En-Arrh personality and temporarily loses his hand, but gets an artificial hand after defeating an alternate version of the Joker. Batman's mental struggle with Zur-En-Arrh continues into the events of Gotham War. Throughout the event, Bruce's mind is torn between himself and Zur-En-Arrh, losing control of himself in the process. During the "Knight Terrors" event, Batman's body is possessed by Deadman in order to defeat the main villain Insomnia, and Batman collapses due to too much stress on his body and falls into a coma.

=== Main plot ===
Batman wakes up from his coma after eight weeks and learns from Barbara Gordon that the Bat-Family has been taking care of him. Batman goes out to fight crime but finds it too peaceful which he deems suspicious. Batman meets with Tim Drake who tells him that Catwoman wants to hold a meeting with them. Batman meets Nightwing, Jason Todd, Barbara Gordon, Duke Thomas, Kate Kane, Stephanie Brown, Damian Wayne and Cassandra Cain at the meeting where Catwoman reveals that she wants to make Gotham City a better place. Catwoman explains her idea of training low level goons to just rob from the rich and not from the poor, as long as they donate 15 percent of the money to charities, and no harming innocent people. Catwoman tries convincing Batman to not interfere as violent crime in Gotham has plummeted since he was asleep, but Batman argues saying her method will not really get rid of crime, and angrily leaves the meeting. Jason decides to team up with Catwoman to help her against Batman. After meeting with Renee Montoya who belittles his method, Batman sees a robber named Roland Garner fall to his death after being shot at by the owner of an apartment he thought was empty, and decides to fight Catwoman.

Batman takes down Catwoman's henchmen all across Gotham City which causes Catwoman to be nervous and call in Jason Todd. Tim Drake tries to calm down Batman to no avail, and Nightwing meets up with Barbara, Tim, Jason, and Stephanie to discuss Batman's behavior. Professor Pyg holds a meeting with Mad Hatter, Scarecrow, Firefly, Two-Face, Black Mask, and Ventriloquist to hide from Batman. Jason purposely sets off an alarm in a random house to alert Batman so he and Catwoman can ambush him, but Batman attacks Catwoman's forces head-on, knowing it is a trap. Batman easily defeats Catwoman's goons before being attacked by Jason, Nightwing, Tim Drake, Duke Thomas, Spoiler and Cassandra Cain. During the fight, Damian Wayne saves Batman and helps him escape, while Catwoman is angered that Batman destroyed her home base. Batman learns that someone bought Wayne Manor from him, and is nearly overwhelmed with his Zurr-En-Arrh personality wanting to take over. Batman calms himself down, but is shocked to find Vandal Savage in the Batcave.

Vandal Savage explains he bought Wayne Manor, which causes Batman to be distraught and have a mental breakdown in front of his parents grave. Catwoman's lieutenant Marquise tells Catwoman what's been going on recently, and Catwoman asks Jason Todd to train her army on how to steal cars. Batman enters a building where he encounters The Riddler giving him a clue that Catwoman plans to target a ballet show. Batman confronts Jason and incapacitates him, while Savage tries to convince Catwoman to be his lieutenant but she declines his offer. Catwoman is trying to find where Jason is, while it's revealed that Marquise is actually Savage's daughter Scandal Savage.

Vandal Savage explains that he is dying and needs the Lazarus Pits to prolong his life, but Ra's al Ghul does not allow him to use the Lazarus Pits. While waiting to die Scandal Savage finds Vandal Savage and tells him that Ra's Al Ghul died, and takes control of the League of Shadows to find more of the Lazarus Pits after the Lazarus Volcano exploded. Batman kidnaps Jason Todd and uses mind control to implant a failsafe in Jason's mind to make him more fearful. Nightwing tries to go to Batman's base to cut Batman off his technology, but Damian Wayne attacks him. Tim Drake arrives to fend off Damian Wayne, but Batman arrives and a fight breaks out. Nightwing savagely beats up Batman when he finds out Batman is using the Riddler to find Catwoman's thieves and used mind control on Jason, but Tim Drake stops Nightwing. Batman captures them in a net and leaves Damian Wayne, Nightwing and Tim Drake to be caught by the cops, but they escape. Catwoman decides to meet up with Batman to persuade him to stop attacking her group.

Catwoman consoles Batman on what happened, but an explosion knocks them back. Batman escapes, while Catwoman finds out Vandal Savage secretly training her army under his new League of Shadows. Catwoman confronts Vandal Savage who wants to use Catwoman's army to steal items that happen to have the Lazarus Pit in them. Vandal Savage decapitates Catwoman, but it is revealed that "Catwoman" was actually Lady Clayface, who escapes to tell Catwoman what's happening. Vandal Savage meets with Professor Pyg and the rest of the villains to convince them to join his side in order to kill Batman and Catwoman, and regain their henchmen. Catwoman briefly fights against Scandal Savage, and convinces Batman to team up to find Jason Todd. Meanwhile, Jason Todd tries to save a girl in a burning building but is overwhelmed by Batman's failsafe. Thankfully, Batman and Catwoman save him, and is confronted by Mad Hatter, Firefly, Two-Face, Professor Pyg and Ventriloquist.

Tim Drake falls into a trap and is captured by Batman's villains. Batman escapes from the villain and realizes that Vandal Savage is gathering meteor fragments to be immortal again, and Batman asks the Bat Family to help save Tim Drake while he stops Vandal Savage. Batman goes back to the Batcave where he tracks down Vandal Savage is going to the Gotham City Observatory. Catwoman manages to convince some of her henchmen to join her side again, while the Bat-Family frees Tim Drake and fights the Gotham City villains. Catwoman meets up with Batman in the Gotham City Observatory where Batman realizes the meteor fragments are a homing beacon for another huge meteor, and they confront Vandal Savage. During the chaos, Jason Todd use the Batwing to blow up the meteor, and it causes Gotham City Observatory to collapse. Vandal Savage tries to touch the remaining fragments of the meteor, but he seemingly perishes alongside Catwoman who saves Scandal Savage. Two weeks later, Dick Grayson meets up with Bruce Wayne to see how he's been doing, and Bruce announces that he needs time to be by himself due to his recent actions. While patrolling in Gotham City, Batman sees Catwoman's silhouette and realizes she's still alive, while a robber realizes that Bruce Wayne is Batman.

== Reading order ==
- Batman/Catwoman: The Gotham War – Battle Lines #1 (Part 1)
- Batman (Vol. 3) #137 (Part 2)
- Batman/Catwoman: The Gotham War – Red Hood #1 (of 2) (tie-in)
- Catwoman (Vol. 5) #57 (Part 3)
- Batman (Vol. 3) #138 (Part 4)
- Catwoman (Vol. 5) #58 (Part 5)
- Batman/Catwoman: The Gotham War – Red Hood #2 (of 2) (tie-in)
- Batman/Catwoman: The Gotham War – Scorched Earth #1 (final part)

== Critical reception ==
According to Comicbook Roundup, the entire event received an average rating of 6.2 out of 10 based on 370 reviews, indicating mixed or average reviews.
