= Timemaster =

Timemaster may refer to:

- Time Master, 1984 role-playing game
- Timemaster (film), 1995 American film
- TimeMaster H.O., a component of the Apple II system clocks

== See also ==
- Time Masters
