= Batman of Zur-En-Arrh =

Fictional character in DC Comics universe

Batman
- The Tlano version of the Batman of Zur-En-Arrh as seen in Batman #113. Illustrated by Dick Sprang.

Publication information
- Publisher: DC Comics
- First appearance: Batman #113 (February 1958)
- Created by: France Herron (writer); Dick Sprang (artist)

In-story information
- Alter ego: Tlano
- Place of origin: Zur-En-Arrh
- Abilities: Genius-level intellect Hand-to-hand combat

Batman of Zur-En-Arrh is a character appearing in media published by DC Comics. Introduced in the Silver Age, the character is an alien named Tlano from the planet Zur-En-Arrh who decided to become a version of Batman for his own planet.

The character's reappearance in the 2000s rebranded him as a violent and unhinged backup personality of Batman, but the alien version has been revealed to still exist in the main continuity.

== Publication history ==
=== 1950s ===
Batman of Zur-En-Arrh first appeared in Batman #113 (February 1958), in the story "Batman—The Superman of Planet-X!". It was written by France Herron and drawn by Dick Sprang. In the story, Tlano, the Batman from Zur-En-Arrh, brings Earth's Batman to his planet to help him battle giant robots piloted by an unidentified alien race. While on the planet, Earth's Batman discovers he has "Superman-like" powers through similar means of the Superman of his world. The end of the story leaves it ambiguous to the reader whether Batman's adventure was real or a dream.

=== 2000s ===
When Grant Morrison took over the Batman series in September 2006, it began referencing classic moments from the character's career, including using a version of Bat-Mite and reusing a costume and dialogue from the then-50-year-old Batman #156. Among the references was the "Zur-En-Arrh" phrase, which appears on an alley wall and again on a dumpster in Batman #655 and continues to appear, usually as a background element graffiti, until the Batman R.I.P. story arc. The story reveals that the "Zur-En-Arrh" persona is a backup personality created by Bruce Wayne in the event he was ever mentally compromised. The Zur-En-Arrh personality is more violent and unhinged than Batman's normal persona and is dressed in a costume out of red, yellow, and purple rags referencing the one worn by Tlano.

=== 2020s ===
In 2022, when Chip Zdarsky took over as the new Batman writer, he reintroduced the Zur-En-Arrh persona as having created Failsafe, a robot who serves as a contingency plan should Bruce fall from grace. Bruce's struggle with Zur and the consequences of its violent, unflinching methods remained a prominent storyline throughout Zdarsky's run.

== Fictional character biography ==
=== Tlano ===
One night, Bruce Wayne finds himself in a daze. He dresses as Batman and takes off in the Batplane while remaining unclear of his own actions. Batman soon finds out that he has been teleported to another planet called Zur-En-Arrh. There, he meets the scientist Tlano monitoring his activities on Earth and has decided to become a version of Batman for his own planet. On this planet, the Batman of Earth has enhanced abilities, similar to those of Superman, due to the different elements of the alien planet. The two Batmen join forces to defeat giant invading robots piloted by an unidentified alien race. After the robots are destroyed, the Batman of Zur-En-Arrh gives Bruce his Bat-Radia device as a keepsake before he returns to Earth.

=== Bruce Wayne ===
Bruce Wayne as the Batman of Zur-En-Arrh on the variant cover of Batman #679 (September 2008). Illustrated by Tony Daniel.

In the past, the psychiatrist Simon Hurt was hired to oversee an isolation experiment, for which Batman volunteered. During this process, he gave Bruce Wayne a post-hypnotic trigger connected to the phrase "Zur-En-Arrh", young Bruce Wayne's mishearing of his father's last words ("Zorro in Arkham"). Many years later, Hurt is working with the Black Glove when they decide to target Batman and his allies, first spreading information to the effect that Batman's father somehow survived his murder by Joe Chill. Then, using the Zur-En-Arrh trigger in conjunction with drugs, Hurt inflicts Bruce with amnesia and releases Bruce Wayne in the streets of Gotham. Bruce assembles a makeshift Batman costume and declares himself "the Batman of Zur-En-Arrh".

Bat-Mite appears as a hallucination of Batman and counsels the Zur-En-Arrh Batman, revealed to be a backup personality created after a hallucination Batman suffered when exposed to Professor Milo's gas. It was intended to take over for Bruce Wayne if he was ever psychologically attacked in such a manner as to render Batman out of action. The colorful costume expresses a greater confidence and demonstrates a greater willingness to torture and possibly kill his opponents; on one occasion, Zur describes himself as being Batman "when you take Bruce out of the equation".

During his travels during the "Dawn of DC" initiative, Bruce meets Daniel Captio and learns how to create multiple personas. Batman created Zur-En-Arrh when Professor Milo poisoned his mind and caused him to experience his fears. To prevent his mind from getting hijacked, Bruce uses a machine to create his Zur-En-Arrh personality. During a fight against Joker, Batman witnesses Joker killing innocent people which enrages Bruce to allow Zur to take over his body. Zur nearly kills Joker, but stops when his visions of Martha Wayne and Joker convince Bruce to not break his no-killing rule. Bruce then uses the machine to lock Zur to make sure it does not happen again.

When Batman fights Failsafe, a robot created in case he ever went rogue and killed someone, he is forced to unlock the Batman of Zur-En-Arrh from his consciousness and let him take over his body. Tim Drake is surprised by Zur, but remembers reading Bruce's files, and realizes that Zur is the back-up personality of Batman without Bruce Wayne's morality and personality. Zur also revealed that he created Failsafe himself, and when Failsafe attacks, Tim and Zur take him on. However, when Zur refers to Tim Drake as just a soldier and Failsafe nearly kills Tim, Bruce takes over his body again, locking Zur away again.

When Failsafe transports Batman to a different Earth, Batman meets Darwin Halliday, an alternate version of Joker who never became insane. While traveling throughout the multiverse, Batman meets multiple alternate versions of himself, which causes his mind to fracture and his Zur-En-Arrh personality to infect the other Batmen. Additionally, Zur manipulates Batman and causes him to act irrationally during his conflict with the Bat Family and Catwoman. As a result, Batman isolates himself from the Bat-family to prevent himself from hurting them.

Batman finds Joker killing innocent people again, and Joker tells Batman that he wants to meet the real version of him. He then subjects Batman to gas, and forces his Zur-En-Arrh personality to come out, and Zur recruits the alternate versions of himself to hold off Batman. Zur defeats Joker and breaks his back, then implants his consciousness in Failsafe. Zur tells Bruce he plans to replace him due to his old age and his humanity holding Bruce back. Bruce tries his best to stop Zur, but is quickly defeated and sent to Blackgate Penitentiary. It is also revealed that the main Zur has forced other Zur personalities to follow his orders, and created a machine to absorb the other personalities into his mind.

Zur-En-Arrh goes back to Gotham and meets Jason Todd, who attacks him due to Zur influencing Bruce to violate his mind during Gotham War. Failsafe tries to trick Jason, but it does not work. Regardless, Failsafe announces himself in Gotham and Damian Wayne, believing Zur to be the real Bruce's mind uploaded to Failsafe, joins with him in his crusade against crime, while Jason, Tim Drake, Dick Grayson, Barbara Gordon, Cassandra Cain, Duke Thomas, and Stephanie Brown try to find where Bruce is. Zur warns Amanda Waller to stay out of his way, and confronts Daniel Captio on letting Bruce escape. While fighting crime, Damian is suspicious of Zur's activities and uncovers Zur creating Amazo bodies, into which he will upload versions of himself from across the multiverse. This results in Zur imprisoning Damian Wayne when he learns the truth and fights back, replacing him with a clone of Bruce as his Robin. Zur is eventually defeated when Batman tricks him to kill Jason temporarily, which allows Failsafe to reactivate and weaken Zur's personality. Batman reached into Zur's memory and discovered a way to shut down Failsafe, effectively neutralizing Zur.

Amanda Waller secretly steals Failsafe's body for her own purposes.

== Characterization ==
=== Costume ===
The costumes of the two incarnations of the Batman of Zur-En-Arrh are the same, consisting of gaudy, outlandish colors. In the modern continuity, the crazed Bruce Wayne comments that, despite the ostentatiousness of the costume, Robin had dressed this way for years, implying that it reflects the "total confidence" of the Zur-En-Arrh Batman in his ability to attract the attention of his enemies whereas the Earth Batman dresses in dark colors to attack his foes in the shadows.

=== Skills, abilities, and resources ===
Tlano possessed much high-tech equipment, owing to his residence on a futuristic planet. His version of the Batmobile had an "atomic-powered" motor, and he flew a rocket-shaped Batplane. His main weapon was the "Bat-radia", with which he could "jam atmospheric molecules", affecting the equipment of his enemies. At the end of the story, Tlano leaves Bruce with the device, which becomes inoperable in Earth's environment.

The Bruce Wayne incarnation also possesses a Bat-radia. This may or may not reflect a continuity between the two stories, as Grant Morrison has made efforts to treat Batman's entire publication history as his backstory. This version of the device scrambled security systems, for instance, overriding and confusing Arkham Asylum's, as well as serving as a tracking device to allow Batman's allies to find him. To add a note of humor to the story, the radia is presented as a "cheap-ass radio" instead of the object seen in the imaginary story, and members of the Black Glove dismiss it as such until they discover its true purpose.

== In other media ==
=== Television ===
The Tlano incarnation of the Batman of Zur-En-Arrh appears in Batman: The Brave and the Bold, voiced by Kevin Conroy. This version is the protector of Gothtropolis, works as a reporter at the Solar Cycle newspaper, is assisted by a robot butler called Alpha-Red, is an associate of Chancellor Gor-Zonn and Vilsi Vaylar, and is an enemy of Rohtul.

=== Film ===
The Bruce Wayne incarnation of the Batman of Zur-En-Arrh appears in Batman: Death in the Family. Depending on the viewer's choices, if Batman sacrifices himself to save Jason Todd, he will be resurrected by Talia al Ghul via a Lazarus Pit. However, it drives him insane, renders him incapable of traditional speech, and causes him to don a colorful costume. Upon learning of this, Todd will either kill or save Batman. If the former choice is made, Todd hesitates, leading to Batman killing him and Talia. If the latter choice is made, Todd defeats Talia before working with Dick Grayson to help Batman regain his sanity.

=== Video games ===
- The Batman of Zur-En-Arrh appears as a character summon in Scribblenauts Unmasked: A DC Comics Adventure.
- The Batman of Zur-En-Arrh appears as a playable character in Lego Batman 3: Beyond Gotham, voiced by Troy Baker.
- The Batman of Zur-En-Arrh appears as an unlockable alternate skin for Batman in Batman: Arkham Knight.
- The Batman of Zur-En-Arrh appears as an unlockable alternate skin for Batman in Doodle Jump: DC Super Heroes.
- Zur-En-Arrh suits for Dick Grayson, Barbara Gordon, Jason Todd, and Tim Drake appear as alternate skins in Gotham Knights.
