= Time Commander =

- Time Commander as depicted in his debut appearance in The Brave and the Bold #59 (April 1965). Art by Gil Kane, Jack Adler, and Ira Schnapp.

Publication information
- Publisher: DC Comics
- First appearance: The Brave and the Bold #59 (April 1965)
- Created by: Bob Haney; Ramona Fradon

In-story information
- Alter ego: John Starr
- Abilities: Ability to control, manipulate, and travel through time using a special hourglass

The Time Commander is the name of two DC Comics supervillains. The first appeared in Brave and the Bold #59 (April–May 1965). He was created by Bob Haney and Ramona Fradon. The second appeared in JSA Classified #34 (2008).

== Fictional character biography ==
=== John Starr ===
John Starr was a brilliant scientist who turned to crime after the demise of the artificial humanoid project which employed him. He was soon imprisoned, and while incarcerated perfected the Hourglass, which harnessed electricity and gave control over time itself.

Calling himself the Time Commander, the "Modern Monte Cristo", Time Commander's criminal career focused on rewriting his past: making himself appear "railroaded" into prison and killing his former employer. These early schemes were foiled by Batman and Green Lantern.

Years later, Time Commander begins resurrecting the dead by reversing time's flow, with the goal of returning humanity to Eden. Elongated Man, Metamorpho and Rocket Red join up with Animal Man and they track down Time Commander. It is revealed, however, that Time Commander is reversing time in positive ways, such as granting one woman youth and bringing back a dead man. Regardless, Time Commander swiftly defeats most of them, even destroying Rocket Red's armor. Animal Man notices the positive effects but is not sure if it is a good idea in the long run. Time Commander notes he is making life more interesting in general, furthermore that Animal Man does not seem like a bad person, just that Time Commander does not want psychiatric help. Metamorpho smashes Time Commander's hourglass and knocks him out with one punch.

After a later encounter with Epoch, the Time Foes become stuck in a temporal loop (as a result of the dawning moments of Zero Hour affecting reality). Unable to free himself or his teammates, Time Commander seemed doomed to perish there, although they somehow escape later, as the Foes were later seen in other stories post-Zero Hour.

Years later, in a reality affected by two time crises (Zero Hour and Infinite Crisis) since the Time Foes were last seen, Waverider is in a clock store when time freezes. Time Commander appears inside of an hourglass and berates Waverider for his failed promises to make him and other villains Time Masters in exchange for joining his fight. Time Commander and Waverider are soon killed after being attacked by Mister Mind.

Time Commander is resurrected following The New 52 and DC Rebirth relaunches, which rebooted the continuity of the DC universe. Following a confrontation with Batman, he is killed by the Court of Owls. In Absolute Power, Amanda Waller resurrects Time Commander and uses his hourglass to give her Amazo army self-healing abilities.

=== Sterling Fry ===
Sterling Fry is a student of John Starr who succeeds him as Time Commander following his death. However, he is seemingly killed after being exposed to his hourglass' tachyons.

== Powers and abilities ==
Time Commander's hourglass allows him to control time, allowing him to travel through time, move objects or beings through time and manipulate time in various ways.

== Other versions ==
An alternate universe variant of Time Commander appears in a flashback in JLA: Another Nail. This version is the leader of the Warpists, consisting of Calendar Man, Amazo, and Starfire.

== In other media ==
The Time Commander appears in Justice League Unlimited #19.

== See also ==
- Time travel in fiction
- Time Masters
- Epoch (DC Comics)
- Waverider (character)
- Zero Hour: Crisis in Time
- Infinite Crisis
