= House of Brainiac =

2024 Superman crossover story arc

- Publisher: DC Comics
- Publication date: April – June 2024
- Genre: Superhero
Title(s)
- Superman (vol. 6) #13–15
- Action Comics (vol. 1) #1064–1066
- Superman: House of Brainiac Special #1
- Main characters: Superman; Lex Luthor; Brainiac; Lobo; Lois Lane; Superboy (Kon-El)

Creative team
- Writers: Joshua Williamson; Jeremy Adams
- Artists: Rafael Sandoval; Fico Ossio; Edwin Galmon
- Penciller: Rafael Sandoval
- Letterer: Dave Sharpe
- Colorist: Alejandro Sánchez
- Editors: Paul Kaminski; Jillian Grant

"House of Brainiac" is a Superman crossover story arc published by DC Comics in April 2024. The series is written by Joshua Williamson with artwork by Rafael Sandoval, Miguel Mendoca, Rico Ossio, and Edwin Galmon.

Teased in Superman Annual 2023 #1, the story arc is told in Action Comics and Superman, where Superman and Lobo have to deal with an invasion from Brainiac. The event was met with critical acclaim, with praise for Joshua Williamson's writing, the art, the characters, and the action.

== Publication history ==
DC Comics released the "House of Brainiac" storyline in April 2024. Green Lantern and Power Girl have a tie-ins to that event. The event also made a debut of new villain called the Brainiac Queen, a female version of Brainiac.

== Plot ==
=== Prelude ===
Lex Luthor removes Superman's identity by using technology from Warworld (home planet of Mongul) and Henry Bendrix's machines to amplify Manchester Black's psychic ability because he wants the world to not see Superman and Jon Kent as humans. Superman confronts Lex Luthor, and sends him back to prison.

Superman is then asked by Lex Luthor to be the head of Supercorp (a company that will assist Superman in his heroics). Although Superman is hesitant, he begrudgingly agrees to work with Luthor.

Before Superman's first arrival to Metropolis, Luthor had aspired to be the city's first hero, first clashing with and then teaming up with Doctor Pharm and Mr. Graft to work in their research on green kryptonite, discarding them both when he has no more use for them and stealing their research, which leads them to attack Lex Luthor. Superman and Luthor eventually team up to defeat Pharm and Luthor's mother, who was working against her own son. It is later revealed that Brainiac put Czarina (Lobo's home city) in a bottle, and Pharm captured Lobo to run experiments on him. After Superman teams up with Luthor to defeat Pharm and his team, Lobo is freed and Brainiac starts heading to Earth.

=== Main story ===
Lois Lane is enjoying her first day off in years and greets Conner Kent (Superboy), Kong Kenan, Othul-Ra and Osul-Ra (children she and Clark adopted after "Warworld Saga"), Supergirl, Lana Lang, Natasha Irons, Steel, and Perry White on her way to a yoga session with Jimmy Olsen and Silver Banshee. As Clark joins them, he overhears an army of Czarnians and robots descending upon Metropolis. As Superman and his allies started fighting off the robots and Czarnians, Steel reveals he tried calling for backup but something interfered with his systems. Superman realizes that Brainiac is the one behind the invasion, just as Brainiac sends General Chacal (a Czarnian similar to Lobo) to attack Supercorp where Lex Luthor is being detained. Brainiac captures Metallo, Mercy Graves and Lena Luthor (Luthor's daughter), while Luthor barely escapes during the chaos. Brainiac captures all of Superman's allies including Silver Banshee and Luthor, and teleports away before Superman can catch him.

Superman confronts Lobo at the Warriors Bar in Coast City about the Czarnians' invasion in Metropolis but Lobo denies his involvement. While Brainiac is torturing Silver Banshee, he starts coughing up blood, and asks his clones to take him to the cooling chamber. Superman explains to Lobo what happened, and Lobo recognizes Chacal. Supercorp creates vehicles for Superman and Lobo to head toward Brainiac's ship due to the United Planets quarantining Earth. As they pass the United Planets headquarters, they are attacked by Chacal and his minions. After Brainiac heals himself and frees Luthor, Luthor tells Brainiac if he leaves Lena Luthor alone, he will give him Superman. Brainiac is about to take Lana Lang to experiment her, but Supergirl realizes Brainiac's technology is from the planet Colu (because of her experience with Future Brainiac) and deactivates their prison. Superboy and Supergirl, however, realize they still do not have their powers, and have shrunk.

Superboy and Supergirl hide from Brainiac's wolves, and convinces Livewire and Parasite to free themselves and go to Brainiac's station. Livewire and Parasite return Superboy and Supergirl to their normal size, and encounter Lex Luthor and Brainiac experimenting on Lana Lang. Brainiac captures the duo, and transports everyone to his homeworld Colu. Supergirl escapes from her bonds and takes Luthor with her, with Brainiac sending reinforcements to capture them. Superman and Lobo fight off the Czarnians but retreat once they realize Chacal is stalling them for Brainiac. They go to Hardcore Station, a place where intergalactic aliens rest stop, and meet Space Cabbie. Lobo asks where Brainiac is, and Chacal finds them by tracking Lobo's scent. Chacal asks Lobo to take his position as leaders of Czarnians and asks Lobo to take out Superman.

Superman initially gains the upper hand, but Chacal helps Lobo capture Superman. Brainiac decides to run his experiments on Lena, while deciding to capture Lex Luthor and Supergirl after Luthor tells Supergirl that Brainiac is starting to lose his memories after bonding with him. Both of them are saved by Coluans, one of whom claims to be Brainiac's son. Brainiac takes the captured Superman, Parasite, Livewire, Superboy, and Parasite to his room, where he uses their energy to create his wife Brainiac Queen. Lobo and Chacal plan to leave, but Brainiac betrays them by ordering Brainiac Queen to kill the majority of Lobo's people and Chacal to gain more power.

Brainiac tells Superman he plans to let Brainiac Queen devour him and his allies and destroy other worlds to end all of existence. Lobo frees Superman, Livewire, and Parasite to hold off Brainiac Queen. Brainiac tells Lena that due to her having Luthor's spirit and her mother's immortal DNA, he will have his ship absorb her. Brainiac explains that his experience in absorbing knowledge has weakened him and caused him to lose part of his memory. Conner Kent uses his telekinesis to extend his field of control, deactivating Brainiac Queen and disrupting Brainiac's ship.

The Coluans and Superman allies return to normal size, while Superman plans to free all of Brainiac's imprisoned cities. Lex Luthor arrives and tells Superman that Brainiac wants to spread out across multiple bodies in the multiverse as his body cannot sustain the level of knowledge and power. While working with Brainiac, Luthor discovered a hidden back entrance in his programming, and plans to take over Brainiac's entire ship to save Lena. Brainiac realizes what is happening, and orders his family and the Coluans to attack Superman, Lobo, and Supergirl. While Luthor is trying to save Lena, it is revealed that Brainiac offered Lena in exchange for futuristic alien technology. Brainiac experimented on her and forced her to be his avatar, but Superman saved her. Just when Luthor manages to free Lena from Brainiac's programming, Brainiac's Sentries attacks them.

Superman, Lobo, and Supergirl are initially overwhelmed by Brainiac's forces, with Brainiac forcibly taking control of the Coluans. Superboy arrives with the rest of Superman's allies. Luthor and Lena manage to take out the rest of Brainiac's sentries and arrive at the core of Brainiac's hive mind. Luthor is tempted to betray Superman, but decides to connect his mind to the hive to shut down Brainiac's ship and intelligence. Lena warns him that it will overload his mind, but Luthor does it nonetheless.

Lobo shrinks Brainiac's army so he can carry them to safety, while Superman confronts Brainiac, who reveals to Superman that his intelligence has been shutting down, allowing him to experience emotions for the first time. Superman realizes that Brainiac has been seeking love and family. Brainiac makes Superman promise to save his city and family, and Superman agrees. Brainiac warps Brainiac Queen away before the ship explodes and kills him, but not before telling Superman that he has learned the secret of the universe and realizes that everything will end. Everyone reunites with each other in Metropolis, while Vril enlarges the rest of Brainiac's cities and creates a new planet called Colu 2.0 to house them. Superman thanks Lobo for his help; Lobo leaves but not before promising Superman that they will have a real fight. Superman reunites with Lois in Metropolis, but is shocked to learn from Lena that Lex Luthor no longer remembers who he is due to his exposure to Brainiac's ship. Meanwhile, Doomsday is pounding away.

=== Tie-ins ===
==== Green Lantern ====
The United Planets order Guy Gardner to bring Lobo in due to his dangerous behavior. Guy finds out Lobo has seemingly been wrestling and calls Booster Gold to confront him on letting Lobo be in a wrestling match, but Booster Gold hangs up. Guy interrupts the match, and takes Lobo into custody, but is confronted by space dolphins. Guy and Lobo hide from the space dolphins, and goes to a planet to ask for an interspace transmitter for backup. Guy learns that this "Lobo" is just a random Czarnian, and the Czarnian accidentally reveals their location to where all the bounty hunters will want to attack "Lobo" due to the high bounty.

==== Superman: House of Brainiac Special #1 ====
Brainiac reminisces on how similar Krypton and Czarnia (Lobo's home planet) origins were, except Czarnians unlocked the secret to immortality. This caused conflict between the Czarnians where one side wanted to spread their knowledge across the universe, while the other wanted to spread destruction. One Czarnian named Chacal rebelled the benevolent Czarnians and led a rebellion. The leader of the benevolent Czarnians named Tribb discovered Brainiac and asked for his help.

In exchange for Brainiac taking care of Chacal, Tribb would give him one city of her planet, and give him the secret to immortality. Brainiac agreed, but discovered that Czarnians are inherently violent, and one day the benevolent Czarnians will be just as ruthless as Chacal. Brainiac betrayed Tribb and captured the city of Paz, overrun by the General's forces, for his collection, but felt slight regret over seeing what he had done.

In the present day, Perry White is running for mayor who is nervous about his debate against Garon Blake who wants to deport aliens living in Metropolis. Perry is uncomfortable with the increase in xenophobia in Metropolis and talks to a bartender on what to do. During the debate, Garon thanks Brainiac for abducting the aliens during the recent invasion. Perry points out that thanks to the aliens living in Metropolis, people are safer and all Garon wants is their money. An alien girl is discovered in the debate, which leads to a riot, but one of Garon's supporters decides to join Perry's side after seeing how violent and xenophobic the supporters were to the alien. Amanda Waller meets with the Council of Light, which turns out to be multiple versions of Brainiac. It is revealed that Brainiac teleported Waller and her Suicide Squad when they fought the Crime Syndicate before "Dark Crisis". Waller is angry that Brainiac used her, and warns him to stay out of her way.

== Titles involved ==
=== Main series ===
- Action Comics #1064–1066
- Superman #13–15

=== Tie-ins ===
- Green Lantern #10–12
- Power Girl #8–10
- Superman: House of Brainiac Special

== Critical reception ==
According to Comic Book Roundup, the entire event received an average rating of 8.5 out of 10 based on 214 reviews. Gabe Hernandez from Weird Science praised the story as "intriguing" and the characterization of Brainiac, the latter aspect of which Gabe thought could open the door to a new status quo for the character in future stories. David Brooke from Action Comics called "House of Brainiac" "a great superhero adventure worth checking out", saying that the title combines the space opera with action that will entertain the readers.

== Future ==
The end of "House of Brainiac" leads to "Absolute Power", DC's company-wide event, which features the Brainiac Queen into the "Trinity of Evil" alongside Amanda Waller and Failsafe, working together into a campaign to drain the powers of all metahumans, regardless of being heroes or villains.
