= Absolute Power (comics) =

Comic book crossover event

- Cover of Absolute Power #1 art by Dan Mora.
- Publisher: DC Comics
- Publication date: July 3 – October 2, 2024
Title(s)
See below
- Main characters: Amanda Waller; Brainiac Queen; Dreamer; Batman of Zur-En-Arrh; Green Arrow; Justice League; Titans; Failsafe

Creative team
- Writer: Mark Waid
- Artists: Mikel Janín; Dan Mora
- Colorists: Patricia Mulvihill; Alejandro Sánchez
- Editor: Paul Kaminski

"Absolute Power" is a 2024 American comic book crossover event published by DC Comics. Serving as the conclusion to the Dawn of DC initiative, the main limited series was written by Mark Waid, with art by Dan Mora. The storyline ran between July 3 and October 2, 2024. The event takes place in the aftermath of "House of Brainiac". The primary limited series received positive reviews, with critics praising Mark Waid's writing, the artwork, the action, and its conclusion.

== Premise ==
To neutralize the abilities of every metahuman around the world, Amanda Waller recruits Failsafe and the Brainiac Queen into the Suicide Squad, beginning a campaign of hate and fear against metahumans. In response, the Justice League and the remaining heroes form a Resistance movement.

== Publication history ==
"Absolute Power" is a crossover event published by DC Comics and was released on July 3, 2024. The main limited series of four issues is written by Mark Waid and drawn by Dan Mora. During the Dawn of DC initiative, a "Trinity of Evil" was teased, featuring Amanda Waller, leader of A.R.G.U.S., Checkmate and the Suicide Squad, alongside the Batman of Zur-En-Arrh, a Silver Age character who was reintroduced in 2022 during the "Failsafe" arc from Batman (vol. 3) #125–130 by Chip Zdarsky and Jorge Jiménez, and the Brainiac Queen, a female variation of Brainiac who was introduced in 2024 during the "House of Brainiac" storyline by Joshua Williamson and Rafa Sandoval.

== Plot ==
=== Background ===
In response to recent events involving metahumans, Amanda Waller decides that superpowers, regardless of whether they come from superheroes or supervillains, are too dangerous to be left unchecked. She gains the approval of the Council of Light, a group of clones of Brainiac, to take drastic measures. To achieve her goal, Waller takes over the Hall of Justice, founding the Bureau of Sovereignty to discredit the Justice League and Titans. In addition, Waller coerces Dreamer and Green Arrow to work for her in taking over Gamorra and create a metahuman prison.

=== Main story ===
==== Issue #1: "Powerless" ====
In Metropolis, a group of robbers attempt to escape using a helicopter. Superman tries to de-escalate the situation, but one of the robbers fires his pistol at Superman, which manages to injure him and causes him to fall from the sky.

In Keystone City 28 hours earlier, Animal Man and Animal Girl land in the park and are met by a mob that nearly beats Animal Man to death. Batman and Robin watch news reports on Animal Man's attack and videos depicting superheroes committing acts of violence and destruction across the globe. Batman deduces the videos are fake, created by artificial intelligence to discredit superheroes. In the Hall of Order, Waller reveals to Sarge Steel that the Brainiac Queen created the videos as part of her plan to take down every superhero on the planet. Failsafe arrives and activates Task Force VII.

In the present, Superboy and Jon Kent arrive and see Superman injured and falling to the ground. They manage to grab him, but are depowered and captured by Amazo robots. Amanda Waller starts a worldwide broadcast, stating her intention to solve the super-powered being problem permanently. At the same time, the Amazo robots of Task Force VII, consisting of Depth Charge, Global Guardian, Jadestone, Last Son, Paradise Lost, and Velocity, attack. They depower and capture the majority of superheroes around the world. As Batman deduces that Waller would not start such an attack if she had not already won, he is attacked by Failsafe. Batman tries to warn the heroes on their secret communication channel, but is intercepted by Green Arrow, who is working for Waller. Meanwhile in an undisclosed location, the Brainiac Queen gives Jon Kent cybernetic enhancements, rendering him amnesiac.

==== Issue #2: "Resistance" ====
The remaining heroes regroup in the Fortress of Solitude. Waller, Brainiac Queen, and Failsafe take over the Hall of Justice while trying to locate the rest of the resistance. While Superman heals from his wound, the rest of the heroes argue over who should be the leader of the resistance. Nightwing calms everyone down, and the heroes decide Nightwing should be the leader of the resistance. Nightwing asks Batman to find if Amanda Waller has a Mother Box, Superman to gather allies in the multiverse, Black Canary to find out why Green Arrow is working for Waller, and Wonder Woman and Robin to find Waller's prison. A possessed Jon Kent and Brainiac Queen attack the heroes. Brainiac Queen captures Yara Flor, Wonder Girl, and Red Tornado while the rest of Task Force VII arrive. Dreamer arrives, but is disturbed by how callous Amanda Waller is to the heroes. Blue Beetle and Mister Terrific use the Phantom Zone projector to escape and Superman has the Fortress of Solitude self-destruct. Wonder Woman and Aquaman destroy the glass dome containing Kandor, allowing its inhabitants to distract Brainiac Queen long enough for Dreamer to send the rest of the heroes to the Phantom Zone before the Fortress explodes. Brainiac Queen repossesses Jon Kent while Green Arrow grabs Time Commander's hourglass.

==== Issue #3: "Last Stand" ====
In Gateway City, Hawkgirl asks for backup as she and Mammoth are attacked by Amazo robots. The remaining heroes land on Themyscira where Donna Troy and Wonder Woman convince Nubia to provide refuge. Barry Allen manages to get kryptonite from the Fortress of Solitude, Black Canary and Green Arrow's team have gone out to uncover Green Arrow's motivations, Hal Jordan retrieves Waller's weapons, and Superman, Batman, Wonder Woman, and Robin have gone out on separate missions. Nightwing instructs Aquaman, Blue Beetle, Red Tornado, and Yara Flor to take out Time Commander in Amanda Waller's headquarters, Donna Troy and the Amazons defend Themyscira, and the rest will have to save the remaining heroes. Failsafe attacks the Minister of Shanghai, and Brainiac Queen starts absorbing data from all Internet servers. Amanda Waller is enraged that the Amazo robots are gaining morality and sentience and tells Failsafe to initiate a partial reboot. Aquaman's team is attacked by Bizarro, but they quickly dispatch him and find Time Commander. They are then attacked by Black Alice and Deadeye. During the chaos, one of Aquaman's team members is killed. Brainiac Queen and Jon Kent attack Themyscira, but with the help of Nightwing, Mister Terrific and Artemis of Bana-Mighdall, Jon is freed from Waller's control. Jon Kent defeats Brainiac Queen by showing her that Waller is the true enemy. Batman and Superman arrive and they teleport Brainiac Queen to Pluto by using the Mother Box, with Zatanna reporting that she and Superman have unlocked the Dark Paths to enable teleportation, and Batman confronts Time Commander on how he can return everyone's powers. Meanwhile, Barry Allen is directed by Steve Trevor to head to the basement of Waller's base, and discovers that she is assembling a multiversal army.

==== Issue #4: "Showdown" ====
The rest of the heroes launch an attack on Waller's base on Gamorra while her multiversal allies attack Barry. Hal Jordan intervenes, giving Barry time to shut down the gateway. Task Force VII overwhelm the heroes while Nightwing is forced to deal with Failsafe and Waller weakens Jon Kent with kryptonite. Batman and Ted Kord meet with Time Commander where they realize the reason why Task Force VII can regenerate is they used Time Commander's technology to restore themselves from injury before they were attacked. Time Commander plans to use his hourglass to override one of the Amazo robots, which will cause a chain reaction that will destroy Task Force VII and return the heroes' stolen powers. Time Commander and Batman are knocked out before they can use the device, but Green Arrow picks it up and shoots it at one of the robots, shutting down Task Force VII and restoring the heroes' powers. This also causes Failsafe to be deactivated, while Wally West and Jay Garrick hold off the multiversal army. Green Arrow explains that he knew Waller would not trust him because she had telepaths around her, which is why he had Martian Manhunter put in a telepathic input that made him believe in Waller's cause until it timed out. Dreamer returns and knocks out Waller before she can attack Nightwing, and explains how Jon dreamed of her constantly while under Brainiac Queen's control, allowing her to enter the Dreamscape and heal her wounds. Barry is forced to sever the universe's connection to the rest of the multiverse to stop Waller's army from coming through, while Waller goes on a rant about how she won by manipulating the world to hate metahumans. Unknown to her, Nightwing has Air Wave record her her speech to the world.

Two days later, the world is recovering from Waller's attack. Wally and Jay Garrick confirm they cannot access the multiverse. It is revealed that whatever Barry did to separate their world from the multiverse also severed his connection to the Speed Force. Dreamer erases Waller's memory of the heroes' identities and leaves her alone in prison. Green Arrow calls a meeting with Batman, Superman, and Wonder Woman to explain his actions. They begrudgingly accept his apology, with Batman revealing that while most of the heroes' abilities returned, others inadvertently gained the abilities of other metahumans in place of their original abilities. Green Arrow admits that his undercover plan was not the smartest, but insists that the whole event would never have happened if they had been more communicative and never disbanded the Justice League. Superman, Batman, and Wonder Woman show him the schematics for the new Watchtower.

=== Subplots ===
==== Amanda Waller's rising ====
Waller explains how she suffered the tragedy of losing her family due to crime, which led her to found the Suicide Squad. Moreover, her experience on Earth 3 has caused her to be more radicalized and hate the metahumans.

==== Task Force VII's rampage ====
Task Force VII are tasked with depowering and capturing any heroes who escaped the initial attack, but they also absorb some of the heroes' morality, causing them to begin rebelling against Waller. Meanwhile, Steve Trevor reports to the metahuman prison base on Gamorra so the Bureau of Sovereignty can monitor him. Sarge Steel imprisons Trevor, but he escapes and learns that Waller is working with the Crime Syndicate.

== Titles involved ==
=== Preludes ===
| Title / | Issue(s) | Writer | Artist(s) | Colorist | Premiere date | Finale date | Note |
|---|---|---|---|---|---|---|---|
| Batman (vol. 3) | #145–149 | Chip Zdarsky | Jorge Jiménez | Tomeu Morey | March 5, 2024 | June 18, 2024 | "Dark Prisons" story arc |
| Free Comic Book Day 2024: Absolute Power Special Edition | One-shot | Mark Waid | Mikel Janín | Patricia Mulvihill | May 5, 2024 | | —N/a |
| Titans (vol. 7) | #11 | Tom Taylor | Lucas Meyer | Adriano Lucas | May 21, 2024 | | —N/a |
| Action Comics | #1066 | Joshua Williamson | Rafa Sandoval | Alejandro Sánchez | June 25, 2024 | | "House of Brainiac" crossover |
| Superman (vol. 6) | #15 | Joshua Williamson | Rafa Sandoval | Alejandro Sánchez | June 25, 2024 | | "House of Brainiac" crossover |

==== Countdown to Absolute Power ====
| Title | Issue(s) | Writer | Artist(s) | Colorist | Premiere date | Finale date |
|---|---|---|---|---|---|---|
| Suicide Squad: Dream Team | #1–4 | Nicole Maines | Eddy Barrows; Eber Ferreira | Adriano Lucas | March 12, 2024 | June 11, 2024 |
| Green Arrow (vol. 7) | #12–13 | Joshua Williamson | Eric Gapstur; Phil Hester; Sean Izaakse; Amancay Nahuelpan | Romulo Fajardo Jr. | May 28, 2024 | June 25, 2024 |
| The Flash (vol. 6) | #10 | Simon Spurrier | Vasco Georgiev; Ramón Pérez | Matt Herms | June 25, 2024 | |

=== Limited series ===
| Title | Issue | Writer | Artist | Colorist | Premiere date | Finale date |
|---|---|---|---|---|---|---|
| Absolute Power | #1–4 | Mark Waid | Dan Mora | Alejandro Sánchez | July 3, 2024 | October 2, 2024 |
| Absolute Power: Task Force VII | #1–7 | Jeremy Adams; John Layman; Pornsak Pichetshote; Alex Paknadel; Dan Watters; Leah Williams; Stephanie Williams | Khary Randolph; Max Raynor; Claire Roe; Pete Woods; Marco Santucci; Caitlin Yarsky | Alex Guimarães | July 10, 2024 | September 25, 2024 |
| Absolute Power: Origins | #1–3 | John Ridley | Alitha Martinez | Andrew Dalhouse | July 24, 2024 | September 25, 2024 |

=== One-shots ===
| Title | Writer | Artist | Colorist | Premiere date |
|---|---|---|---|---|
| Absolute Power: Ground Zero | Nicole Maines; Mark Waid; Joshua Williamson; Chip Zdarsky | V. Ken Marion; Gleb Melnikov; Skylar Patridge | Patricio Delpeche | June 25, 2024 |
| Absolute Power: Super Son | Sina Grace; Nicole Maines | Travis Mercer; John Timms | Hi-Fi; Rex Lokus | September 18, 2024 |

=== Tie-ins ===
| Title | Issue | Writer | Artist | Premiere date | Finale date |
|---|---|---|---|---|---|
| Batman (vol. 3) | #150–152 | Chip Zdarsky | Mike Hawthorne | July 3, 2024 | September 4, 2024 |
| Green Lantern (vol. 7) | #13–15 | Jeremy Adams | Fernando Pasarín | July 10, 2024 | September 11, 2024 |
| Superman (vol. 6) | #16–18 | Joshua Williamson | Jamal Campbell | July 17, 2024 | September 18, 2024 |
| Wonder Woman (vol. 6) | #11–13 | Tom King | Tony S. Daniel | July 17, 2024 | September 18, 2024 |
| Green Arrow (vol. 7) | #14–16 | Joshua Williamson | Amancay Nahuelpan | July 24, 2024 | September 25, 2024 |

== Release order ==
- Free Comic Book Day 2024: Absolute Power Special Edition
- Absolute Power: Ground Zero
- Absolute Power #1
- Batman (vol. 3) #150
- Absolute Power: Task Force VII #1
- Green Lantern (vol. 7) #13
- Superman (vol. 6) #16
- Wonder Woman (vol. 6) #11
- Absolute Power: Task Force VII #2
- Absolute Power: Origins #1
- Green Arrow (vol. 7) #14
- Absolute Power: Task Force VII #3
- Absolute Power #2
- Batman (vol. 3) #151
- Absolute Power: Task Force VII #4
- Green Lantern (vol. 7) #14
- Superman (vol. 6) #17
- Wonder Woman (vol. 6) #12
- Absolute Power: Task Force VII #5
- Absolute Power: Origins #2
- Green Arrow (vol. 7) #15
- Absolute Power #3
- Batman (vol. 3) #152
- Absolute Power: Task Force VII #6
- Green Lantern (vol. 7) #15
- Absolute Power: Super Son
- Superman (vol. 6) #18
- Wonder Woman (vol. 6) #13
- Absolute Power: Task Force VII #7
- Absolute Power: Origins #3
- Green Arrow (vol. 7) #16
- Absolute Power #4

== Critical reception ==
According to Comicscored.com, the Absolute Power four-issue limited series received a "Very Good" rating, with a Comicscore Index of 84 based on 82 ratings from critics. The Absolute Power: Task Force VII seven-issue limited series received a "Good" rating, with a Comicscore Index of 71 based on 74 ratings from critics. The Absolute Power: Origins three-issue limited series received a "Good" rating, with a Comicscore Index of 77 based on 24 ratings from critics.

According to Comicbook Roundup, Absolute Power received an average rating of 7.8 out of 10 based on 222 reviews.

== Future ==
Absolute Power concluded the Dawn of DC initiative, giving birth to the DC All In initiative, which was overseen by Joshua Williamson and Scott Snyder, and began in October 2024. Snyder said that All In would not consist of any reboots or relaunches to current titles.
