= Knight Terrors =

2023 DC Comics story arc

Publication information
- Publisher: DC Comics
- Format: Limited series
- Publication date: July – August 2023
- Main character(s): Insomnia; Deadman; Sandman; The DC Universe

Creative team
- Written by: Joshua Williamson
- Penciller: Howard Porter

"Knight Terrors" is an American comic book line-wide crossover event published by DC Comics from July to August 2023. The event is headlined by Joshua Williamson writing the opening and ending one-shots along with the core 4-issue miniseries. The event starts off in Knight Terrors: First Blood, with art by Howard Porter, and ends with Knight Terrors: Night's End. The entire event received positive reviews from critics, with critics praising the story and tie-ins, although there was criticism on the pacing.

== Publication history ==
Knight Terrors is a 2023 DC Comics crossover event written by Joshua Williamson and drawn by Howard Porter. Other creators include Guillem March and Chris Bachalo. The event was announced in February during a ComicsPRO convention on Pittsburgh.

Williamson said: "I love horror comics, and it's been a blast bringing the energy to Dawn of DC. Knight Terrors showcases the horror side of our heroes as a brand-new villain confronts them with their worst nightmares. It's a fun and horrific event that brings together all of the heroes and villains of DC, along with some surprises!"

Along with the core 4-issue miniseries there are various 2-issue tie-in miniseries focusing on different characters during the event. These titles replaced the main ongoing series, with many written by the same creatives working on the ongoing series.

== Plot summary ==
=== Prelude ===
Damian Wayne dreams of himself, his mother, his father, his girlfriend and Connor Hawke at a beach having a good time. However, his family suddenly attacks him and he sees a giant eyeball in the sky and visions of the Justice League and Teen Titans in trouble. Damian wakes up from his nightmare, revealing that he passed out while he and Batman were chasing Firefly and Killer Moth. Damian is relieved, telling himself it was just a dream and he had nothing to worry about.

=== Main plot ===
Doctor Destiny is attacked in his dream by a mysterious being in a twisted version of the Hall of Justice. Deadman observes a funeral happening and feels a strange presence coming from the Hall of Justice. Superman, Wonder Woman, and Batman meet up to discuss what is happening recently between the three of them and an alarm that just happened. Batman tells them he did not call any of them and sees a mutilated corpse of Doctor Destiny. Harley Quinn calls Batman to tell them that Doctor Destiny's body is still in Arkham; Deadman tries to possess Destiny's fake body but it doesn't work, so he possessed Batman's body to tell Superman and Wonder Woman that someone is trying to merge the Realms of Life and Death together.

Batman expels Deadman's soul out of his body, and Wonder Woman decides to go to Zatanna to ask for her help while Superman goes to Supercorp. Wonder Woman, Zatanna, and Detective Chimp observe the fake body, with Zatanna saying that the fake body is a powerful dream construct. Batman and Deadman head to Arkham Tower where Doctor Destiny is killed, but gets revived by a mysterious being who wants the Nightmare Stone and the Dream stone in the Hall of Justice. The mysterious being calls himself Insomnia and summons nightmare constructs to invade the world, and proceeds to cause the entire world to fall under his slumber, including heroes like Batman, Superman, Wonder Woman, Joker, Nightwing, The Flash, Ravager, and Green Lantern.

Deadman reveals that he hid the Nightmare Stone from Insomnia, but does not tell him if he hid it in the real waking world or in the dream world. It's revealed that the Nightmare Stone is in Arkham Tower, and when the Lazarus volcano exploded all around the world, it infected a man who was turned into Insomnia. Insomnia expels Deadman out of his body, and Deadman realizes Insomnia murdered John Dee when he would not tell him where the Nightmare Stone was. Deadman possesses Batman's body again to escape, and goes to the zombified corpse of Wesley Dodds for help.

Wesley Dodds explains he met Insomnia when he was a human leader of a cult who sought the Nightmare Stone by offering sacrifices. Wesley Dodds stopped Insomnia from acquiring the stone, while Insomnia tracks down John Dee's grandson on the Nightmare Stone's location, but John Dee's grandson does not know. Deadman and Wesley Dodds go to Mister Terrific's headquarters where they meet Red Tornado and learned that majority of the world has fallen under Insomnia's spell. Deadman accesses Insomnia's memory, but they are attacked by Insomnia's forces called the Sleepless Knights.

Damian Wayne arrives to help Deadman and Wesley Dodds fight against the Sleepless Knights, and they manage to escape. Deadman goes into Insomnia's memory again to find out that Insomnia's real name is Christopher who blamed the Justice League for turning him into a monster. Damian Wayne deduces that the Nightmare Stone is in a realm between the dead and the living, so Wesley Dodds creates a chemical concoction to put Damian and Deadman to sleep while the Sleepless Knights attack. Damian and Deadman arrive at a place call the Reality Stream where Deadman realizes the Nightmare Stone wants him to find it. Deadman manages to acquire the Nightmare Stone and escape the Reality Stream.

Deadman, Damian Wayne, and Wesley Dodds head to Arkham Tower to find Insomnia. While walking, Damian Wayne is nearly tricked by Insomnia to let his guard down, but he sees through the illusion. Insomnia also tries to trick Deadman to join his side by promising to bring back his loved ones, but Deadman refuses. The trio meet Insomnia's real body, where Deadman explains Insomnia's real name is Christopher Lukas, a killer who refused to sleep so people nicknamed him Insomnia, and was locked in Arkham when he saw something in his dreams that drove him insane. Deadman leaves Batman's body and plans to use the Nightmare Stone to cure Insomnia of his powers from the Lazarus volcano, and sees Insomnia's memory where its revealed Insomnia became evil because his family was killed during Dark Nights: Metal, and Insomnia blamed the Justice League for not saving them. Insomnia kills himself in his sleep to trap Deadman, which wakes up the rest of the heroes that were affected by Insomnia's spell, but also brings their nightmares into the real world.

Insomnia brings Deadman back to the real world, and attempts to reward him by giving him a dream of having a family. The Justice League arrive after waking up from their nightmares, and Insomnia summons out the monsters from the League's minds to fight against them. Deadman breaks free of Insomnia's spell after hearing Wesley Dodd's voice, but is seemingly killed by Insomnia. Batman, Superman, and Wonder Woman go to the dream version of Doctor Destiny's body to find the Dreamstone, which may counter the Nightmare Stone. Insomnia arrives and starts turning Batman, Superman, and Wonder Woman into their nightmare versions of themselves, but Deadman arrives to stop Insomnia, revealing he faked his death. Deadman sacrifices himself to stop Insomnia, while Insomnia is forced to relive nightmares of his family killing him over and over. While Insomnia is defeated, as a result of his actions, the world now fears the heroes. Wesley Dodds dies once again, and Batman collapses as a result of Deadman possessing his body too long and overworking it. Meanwhile, Amanda Waller and her henchmen, Bright, steal the Nightmare Stone and Doctor Fate's helmet, and combine it with an unknown person to form Doctor Hate, ordering them to take down the Titans.

=== Tie-ins ===
==== Knight Terrors: Action Comics ====
Power Girl falls under Insomnia's spell, seeing her boyfriend nearly raping her and her parents being dismissive. Power Girl wakes up from her nightmare but is attacked by Lilith Clay, and it's revealed that Power Girl is stuck in a simulation. Meanwhile, Kong Kenan, Conner Kent, Natasha Irons, Osul-Ra and Otho-Ra (children Superman adopted during the "Warworld Saga") are watching a movie when Osul-Ra has a nightmare about Cyborg Superman. After waking up, they are attacked by a Cyborg Superman who has absorbed Conner Kent and Krypto. Power Girl tries freeing herself from the simulation multiple times, to no effect. Insomnia tries impersonating Lilith Clay to break her down, but Power Girl finds a kryptonian ship causing the simulations and destroys it, causing her to wake up but realizes that Insomnia has the entire world under his spell. Meanwhile, the Cyborg Superman who absorbed Conner Kent and Krypto attacks the family, but Kong Kenan takes the family outside before being incapacitated. Cyborg Superman summons Mongul to scare the family, but Osul-Ra and Otho-Ra defeat him after realizing Cyborg Superman is not in full control. Osul-Ra and Otho-Ra wake up with Natasha Irons and Conner Kent's help, and realize that Insomnia has made the entire world fall under his spell.

==== Knight Terrors: Batman ====
Batman is trapped in a nightmare realm where he relives the death of Thomas Wayne and Martha Wayne's death at the hands of Joe Chill. He is transported to a graveyard where he encounters Insomnia (dressed as Robin) who wants the Nightmare Stone. Insomnia summons dead corpses of Dick Grayson, Tim Drake, Commissioner Gordon, Barbara Gordon, and Selina Kyle to overwhelm Batman, and Batman is transported to Joe Chill's body where he shoots his parents. Insomnia turns into a younger Bruce Wayne and attacks Batman, but Batman snaps out of it and escapes, realizing that Deadman is controlling his body. Insomnia confronts Batman, but Batman scares him off. Batman sees his younger self and comforts him saying that in the future he will meet new friends to help overcome his parents' death. Batman wakes up in the real world to see Gotham in chaos and Damian Wayne waiting for him, telling him they have lost.

==== Knight Terrors: Detective Comics ====
Commissioner Gordon visits the gravestone of his dead son when Insomnia's spell affects Gotham City. Gordon encounters a group of criminals called The Good People who summon Pentapriests from the Fifth Dimension to give them power, wealth and knowledge. The Pentapriests agree and mutate The Good People into monsters to terrorize the city. Commissioner Gordon confronts them and realizes their leader is a woman named Angelica Vanderbar and goes to see her, but finds her choking and Gordon's body starts to fall apart as a side effect of witnessing the Good People turn into monsters. Gordon tries to fight off the effects and confronts the big monster and manages to trick it into blowing itself up, but the Pentapriests arrive due to the commotion. The Pentapriest revealed they have gravely wounded Barbara Gordon, so Commissioner Gordon tells them to fix her. Barbara Gordon tells her dad she contacted the Pentapriests because she realizes Batman and her dad are getting older, and wanted to find out a way to slow down their aging. The Pentapriests disappear, and Gordon wakes up, realizing it was just a dream but disturbed on what just happened.

==== Knight Terrors: Green Lantern ====
Hal Jordan is piloting a plane with Carol Ferris when Insomnia's spell transports him to an early childhood memory of his father's funeral. He encounters zombified versions of his parents, and is transported throughout different parts of his childhood before encountering Parallax who impersonated the Guardians of the Universe. Jordan eventually overcomes Insomnia's influence through his willpower and escapes the nightmare. Insomnia also tries to attack Sinestro by impersonating his daughter Soranik Natu and steals his power ring.

==== Knight Terrors: Nightwing ====
Nightwing is affected by Insomnia's spell and finds himself in Arkham Asylum with Mad Hatter, Two-Face, and Professor Pyg's henchmen. He encounters Insomnia who forces him to see Scarecrow and the corpses of his parents, Barbara Gordon, and Batman. Nightwing snaps out of it and starts talking to Scarecrow to find a way out when he sees Barbara Gordon being turned into a cyborg. Scarecrow gives Nightwing a map to escape, and while trying to escape Nightwing finds out Harley Quinn is the head of security in Arkham Asylum. Nightwing tries to free Barbara Gordon, but it doesn't work so they go into a secret room where they meet Barbara Gordon hooked up to machines. Nightwing frees her, and Insomnia transports them to the Haly Circus to break Nightwing down. Nightwing, Scarecrow and Barbara Gordon defeat Insomnia's forces, and Nightwing wakes up from his nightmare.

==== Knight Terrors: Punchline ====
Punchline and the Royal Flush Gang attempt to break into the supposedly abandoned Clock Tower that was used by the Bat Family. She soon comes face-to-face with her deepest fear.

==== Knight Terrors: Ravager ====
Rose Wilson saves a girl, Rose Madison, from white monsters who murdered her family. The girl says the leader name is Murder Man, and his group is called Slaughter Squadron who is killing people. Rose realizes the girl is a past version of herself yet has a different family, when Insomnia takes control of Rose Madison and stabs Rose Wilson. In the real world, Peacekeeper finds Rose Wilson unconscious and takes her somewhere safe. Ravager is fighting off enemies in her mind and defeats Murder Man while Peacekeeper manages to wake her up.

==== Knight Terrors: Shazam ====
Mary Marvel is stuck in a nightmare loop where she encounters her family and Black Adam. She also encounters Insomnia, but is knocked out and wakes up to see Adam murdering her loved ones.

==== Knight Terrors: Superman ====
Superman is falling to the ocean as he is hit by Insomnia's spell, and experiences several nightmares where Insomnia tries to interrogate him to find the Nightmare Stone. During his nightmare, Superman is saved by Supergirl but they encounter alternate zombified versions of her. Superman's body is washed up on a beach where he is found by Aquaman, Jackson Hyde, Garth, and Mera. Supergirl recalls that she had a nightmare where her own father was killed by skeletal monsters in Krypton and meets Superman in his dream. They go meet Lois Lane in their dreams to fight a monster conjured by Insomnia and manage to defeat it, which wakes up Superman early enough to save Aquaman from a monster. Aquaman tells Superman that the Atlanteans will help move the people to safety while Superman must deal with Insomnia.

==== Knight Terrors: Robin ====
Tim Drake and Jason Todd are apprehending criminals with Barbara Gordon's help when they are affected by the Insomnia attack and sent into their respective nightmare realms. Tim Drake sees Captain Boomerang killing his father again while Jason Todd is attacked by Joker in his old Red Hood costume. Tim Drake and Jason Todd are overwhelmed by the nightmares and nearly give up. However, when Tim Drake overhears that Jason Todd thinks that he is a failure, he motivates Jason Todd by explaining that Batman and his family failed him, and even if Jason Todd pushes people away, people still care about him. Jason Todd then tells Tim Drake that he thinks he can save everyone, but he can't and should accept responsibility for that. With renewed confidence, Tim Drake and Jason Todd defeat the nightmares and are the first of the Bat Family to wake up, before deciding to team up to fight Insomnia.

==== Knight Terrors: The Flash ====
Barry Allen is investigating a crime scene when he gets a call from Iris West and Jay Garrick that Wally West has been mortally wounded by Gorilla Grodd who possesses the Spear of Destiny. In the hospital, Wally West tells Barry that something is wrong with Speed force due to a monster being trapped in it. Barry confronts Gorilla Grodd and beats him up, but Gorilla Grodd warns Barry that someone is watching him. Barry Allen goes to the Watchtower where he encounters a mutated Hal Jordan. Jordan creates his own Cosmic Treadmill in order for Barry Allen to travel back in time to save Wally. Barry is too late, and is dragged in the Speed Force where he encounters the monster Wally mentioned to him in the hospital. As Barry Allen tries to save Wally multiple times, he is left disfigured and battered from the monster. Barry goes to Iris West to see how Wally West is doing, and Insomnia impersonates Barry's mother to persuade him to keep on going. Barry Allen kills Hal Jordan when he refuses to help him, and travels to the 25th Century to steal Eobard Thawne's speed to get faster. Barry goes to the moment where Gorilla Grodd stabs Wally West, but encounters the monster in the Speed Force. Barry realizes that the monster in the Speed Force is a Paradox that is consisted of his multiple attempts trying to save Wally West, and is absorbed by the monster. However, the real Wally West breaks Barry Allen out of his nightmare and brings him into the real world, explaining that Barry Allen was in a trance running non-stop for hours, and decides to bring Barry up to speed over what's happening.

==== Knight Terrors: The Joker ====
Joker is confronting Batman when Batman slips and falls on his face, knocking him unconscious and falling over a building killing him. After the incident, Joker grows bored and joins a company where even though he kills people, everyone acts normal and friendly. Joker hears that Batman has returned and fought crime, but he doesn't believe them as he has Batman's corpse in his closet. Mr. Freeze and Scarecrow want to apply at the company Joker works at, but Joker is enraged that Mister Freeze says Batman is still alive. It's revealed that Joker would sleepwalk and impersonate as Batman fighting crime, and one day when Joker is fighting off criminals he is struck by his own Joker gas, freeing himself from Insomnia's spell and waking up in the real world. Joker then proceeds to go back to sleep after realizing it was just a nightmare.

==== Knight Terrors: Wonder Woman ====
Wonder Woman frees Detective Chimp from a spell, and they team up with John Constantine to save the Justice League Dark in the Nightmare Realm. As they travel further, Wonder Woman and Constantine fall under Insomnia's spells and are incapacitated. Wonder Woman manages to free herself when she realizes that fighting Insomnia's spells would make them stronger, and instead embraces them. Wonder Woman saves Bobo from monsters and frees John Constantine and Justice League Dark from the spell, and goes to Gotham alongside Detective Chimp, John Constantine, Ragman, and Etrigan the Demon.

==== Knight Terrors: Zatanna ====
Zatanna tries telling Red Tornado what just happened when Insomnia attacks her, Wonder Woman, and Detective Chimp with his spell. Zatanna managed to create a protective spell and tried contacting the Justice League Dark but sees two figures trying to get the Nightmare Stone. Zatanna summons Robotman to aid her escape with Wonder Woman and Detective Chimp. Zatanna and Robotman encounter corpses of their loved ones but they manage to put Wonder Woman and Detective chimp in a panic room, but one of the figures stabs Robotman in the back and transforms him into her servant. While The Sleepless Knights and Robotman chase Zatanna, Zatanna sets up traps to slow them down. The leader of the Sleepless Knights, the Sleepless Queen, summons a vision of Zatara to trick Zatanna in order to weaken her, but this fails and Zatanna frees Robotman and the Sleepless Knights retreat. Zatanna apologizes to Robotman for bringing him into this, and they head off to fight Insomnia.

== Titles involved ==
Title	Issues	Creative teams (excluding back ups)			Debut date	Conclusion date
Title	Issues	Writer	Artist	Colorist	Debut date	Conclusion date
Knight Terrors	#1–4	Joshua Williamson	Howard Porter, Giuseppe Camuncoli, Stefano Nesi, and Caspar Wijngaard	Frank Martin and Caspar Wijngaard	July 11, 2023	August 22, 2023
Knight Terrors: Batman	#1–2	Joshua Williamson	Guillem March, David Lafuente, and Trevor Hairsine	Tomeu Morey, Rex Lokus, and Antonio Fabela	July 4, 2023	August 1, 2023
Knight Terrors: First Blood	#1	Joshua Williamson	Howard Porter	Brad Anderson	July 4, 2023	July 4, 2023
Knight Terrors: Ravager	#1–2	Ed Brisson	Dexter Soy	Veronica Gandini	July 4, 2023	August 1, 2023
Knight Terrors: The Joker	#1–2	Matthew Rosenberg	Stefano Raffaele	Romulo Fajardo, Jr.	July 4, 2023	August 1, 2023
Knight Terrors: Poison Ivy	#1–2	G. Willow Wilson	Atagun Ilhan and Mark Morales	Mark Morales and Arif Prianto	July 4, 2023	August 1, 2023
Knight Terrors: Black Adam	#1–2	Jeremy Haun		Nick Filardi and Rex Lokus	July 4, 2023	August 1, 2023
Knight Terrors: Robin	#1–2	Kenny Porter	Miguel Mendonça	Adriano Lucas	July 11, 2023	August 8, 2023
Knight Terrors: The Flash	#1–2	Alex Paknadel	Daniel Bayliss and Tom Derenick	Igor Monti and Pete Pantazis	July 11, 2023	August 8, 2023
Knight Terrors: Shazam!	#1–2	Mark Waid	Roger Cruz and Wellington Diaz	Arif Prianto	July 11, 2023	August 8, 2023
Knight Terrors: Green Lantern	#1–2	Jeremy Adams and Alex Segura	Eduardo Pansica, Julio Ferreira, Mario Foccillo, Jordi Tarragona, and Julio Ferreira	Luis Guerrero and Prasad Rao	July 11, 2023	August 8, 2023
Knight Terrors: Zatanna	#1–2	Dennis Culver	David Baldeon	Rain Beredo	July 11, 2023	August 8, 2023
Knight Terrors: Wonder Woman	#1–2	Josie Campbell and Stephanie Williams	Juan Ferreyra and Meghan Hetrick	Juan Ferreyra and Marissa Louise	July 18, 2023	August 15, 2023
Knight Terrors: Superman	#1–2	Joshua Williamson	Tom Reilly	Nathan Fairbairn	July 18, 2023	August 15, 2023
Knight Terrors: Nightwing	#1–2	Becky Cloonan and Michael W. Conrad	Daniele Di Nicuolo	Adriano Lucas	July 18, 2023	August 15, 2023
Knight Terrors: Catwoman	#1–2	Tini Howard	Leila Leiz	Marissa Louise	July 18, 2023	August 15, 2023
Knight Terrors: Punchline	#1–2	Danny Lore	Lucas Meyer	Alex Guimares	July 18, 2023	August 15, 2023
Batman: The Brave and the Bold	#4	Ed Brisson	Jeff Spokes		July 25, 2023	
Knight Terrors: Action Comics	#1–2	Phillip Kennedy Johnson and Leah Williams	Vasco Georgiev, Mico Suayan, and Fico Ossio	Alex Guimares and Romulo Fajardo, Jr.	July 25, 2023	August 22, 2023
Knight Terrors: Detective Comics	#1–2	Dan Watters	Riccardo Federici, Mike Perkins, and Stefano Raffaele	Brad Anderson, Mike Spicer, and Lee Loughridge	July 25, 2023	August 22, 2023
Knight Terrors: Titans	#1–2	Andrew Constant	Scott Godlewski and Mike Norton	Ryan Cody and Hi-Fi Design	July 25, 2023	August 22, 2023
Knight Terrors: Harley Quinn	#1–2	Tini Howard and Leah Williams	Hayden Sherman, Ben Templesmith, and PJ Holden	Triona Farrell, Ben Templesmith, and Lee Loughridge	July 25, 2023	August 22, 2023
Knight Terrors: Angel Breaker	#1–2	Tim Seeley	Acky Bright	Brian Reber	July 25, 2023	August 22, 2023
Knight Terrors: Night's End	#1	Joshua Williamson	Howard Porter, Giuseppe Camuncoli, Stefano Nesi, and Trevor Hairsine	Rain Beredo and Frank Martin	August 29, 2023	

== Collected editions ==
Title	Material collected	Publication date	ISBN
Knight Terrors	Knight Terrors: First Blood #1, Knight Terrors #1-4, Knight Terrors: Night's End #1	February 6, 2024	978-1779524591
Knight Terrors: Dark Knightmares	Knight Terrors: Batman #1-2, Knight Terrors: Catwoman #1-2, Knight Terrors: Detective Comics #1-2, Knight Terrors: Nightwing #1-2, Knight Terrors: Robin #1-2	February 13, 2024	978-1779524652
Knight Terrors: Knightmare League	Knight Terrors: Action Comics #1-2, Knight Terrors: Green Lantern #1-2, Knight Terrors: Superman #1-2, Knight Terrors: The Flash #1-2, Knight Terrors: Wonder Woman #1-2	February 20, 2024	978-1779524676
Knight Terrors: Knockturnal Creatures	Knight Terrors: Harley Quinn #1-2, Knight Terrors: Poison Ivy #1-2, Knight Terrors: Punchline #1-2, Knight Terrors: The Joker #1-2, Knight Terrors: Zatanna #1-2	February 27, 2024	978-1779524690
Knight Terrors: Terror Titans	Knight Terrors: Angel Breaker #1-2, Knight Terrors: Black Adam #1-2, Knight Terrors: Ravager #1-2, Knight Terrors: Shazam! #1-2, Knight Terrors: Titans #1-2	March 5, 2024	978-1779525680

== Critical reception ==
According to Comicbook Roundup, the entire event received an average rating of 7.9 out of 10 based on 474 reviews. David Harth from Comic Book Resources wrote that "Knight Terrors helps art teams get ahead on issues, allowing fan-favorite artists on the various Dawn of DC series time to bank more pages in before books get published again".
