= List of DC Comics characters: F =

== Fadeaway Man ==
Fadeaway Man is the name of several characters appearing in American comic books published by DC Comics. Fadeaway Man was created by writer Len Wein and artist Rich Buckler, and first appeared in Detective Comics #479 (1978).

=== Anton Lamont ===
Anton Lamont is a professor and member of the Secret Society of Super Villains who wields the Cloak of Cagliostro which enables him to become invisible and intangible.

=== Leo Lamont ===
Leo Lamont is the grandson of Anton Lamont.

== Failsafe ==
Failsafe is an android who Batman created to stop him should he ever go rogue. He is kept in the Batcave for years until the Penguin frames Batman for murder. Believing Batman to have turned evil, Failsafe battles him and is temporarily possessed by Batman's Zur-En-Arrh persona, who transforms his body to resemble Batman.

It was revealed that Failsafe cloned Bruce Wayne so that it can serve as his Robin of Zur-En-Arrh and was programmed to rapidly age if the Bruce Wayne clone turns against it.

In Absolute Power, Failsafe allies with Amanda Waller to drain the powers of Earth's metahumans. He is later destroyed along with Waller's Amazo army.

== Vesper Fairchild ==
Vesper Fairchild is a character appearing in American comic books published by DC Comics. Created by Doug Moench and Kelley Jones, she first appeared in Batman #540 (March 1997).

Fairchild is a radio host who became romantically involved with Bruce Wayne. She was murdered by David Cain in the story Batman: The 10-Cent Adventure, leading to the events of the storyline "Bruce Wayne: Fugitive".

=== Vesper Fairchild in other media ===
Vesper Fairchild appears in Batwoman, voiced by Rachel Maddow.

== Faith ==
Faith is a character appearing in American comic books published by DC Comics. Created by Joe Kelly and Yvel Guichet, she first appeared in JLA #69 (October, 2002).

Faith is a high level telepath and telekinetic that was drafted into the Justice League following the teams disappearance. She briefly served as a member of Doom Patrol.

== Kitrina Falcone ==
Kitrina Falcone is the daughter of Alberto Falcone and the granddaughter of Carmine Falcone.

Inspired by Catwoman, Kitrina becomes a vigilante, known initially as Kittyhawk and later as Catgirl.

== Luca Falcone ==
Luca Falcone is Carmine Falcone's cousin. He was killed by the Red Hood Gang before Batman appeared for the first time in Gotham City.

=== Luca Falcone in other media ===
Luca Falcone appears in The Penguin, portrayed by Scott Cohen. This version is Carmine Falcone's younger brother who temporarily takes over the Falcone crime family following Carmine and Alberto's deaths before Luca is killed by Sofia Falcone.

== Fallout ==
Fallout is the name of several characters appearing in American comic books published by DC Comics. Fallout was created by writer Geoff Johns and artist Ethan Van Sciver, and first appeared in The Flash: Iron Heights (October 2001).

=== Neil Borman ===
The most prominent is Neil Borman, a supervillain and enemy of The Flash, who gained his powers from a nuclear accident. After accidentally killing his family, he was imprisoned in Iron Heights Penitentiary and used as a power source for the facility by Gregory Wolfe. The Flash was able to put an end to this torment to Fallout.

=== Sons of Liberty member ===
There is a member of WildStorm Production's incarnation the Sons of Liberty who went by the name of Fallout.

=== Fallout in other media ===
Neil Borman / Fallout appears in the fourth season of The Flash, portrayed by Ryan Alexander McDonald. This version gained radioactive powers after the Thinker tricked the Flash into exposing the former to dark matter. Due to his uncontrollable powers, Team Flash bring Borman to A.R.G.U.S. custody, but the Thinker kidnaps and turns him into a sacrificial power source for his "Enlightenment" satellite.

== False Face ==
- Further reading: False Face at the Grand Comics Database

False Face is the name of several supervillains appearing in American comic books published by DC Comics.

The concept and first character, created by Mort Weisinger and Creig Flessel, first appeared in Leading Comics #2 (spring 1942) using the name Falseface. The name was later adjusted to "False Face" mirroring minor characters introduced by Fawcett Comics and Timely Comics.

Variations of the character have been introduced in Batman #113 (February 1958) and Birds of Prey #112 (January 2008). In all instances, the character is only identified as "False-Face" or by an alias while in disguise.

=== First Golden Age version ===
The first version seen was among the five small-time criminals hired by organizer Black Star. Along with his colleagues Captain Bigg, Hopper, Brain and Rattler, he staged a robbery at a city bank by disguising himself as a construction worker. False-Face drilled through a water main and used the pressurised escaping water to blast a hole into the bank. After he and his friends robbed the bank, they used a paddy wagon as their getaway vehicle while disguised as police officers. Under the orders of Black Star, False-Face was sent to New Orleans to rob riches from those sponsoring the Mardi Gras event. He and his henchmen disguised themselves as a Clown Krewe and insinuated themselves onto a parade float. This managed to attract the attention of the Shining Knight who was in the area at the time. False-Face escaped, but his henchmen were apprehended. He then attempted to steal the Star Sapphire Gem from Mardi Gras organizer J.J. Ennis. To do this, False-Face disguised himself as a police detective and infiltrated Ennis's house. He once again fought against the Shining Knight, and briefly subdued him, but the Shining Knight escaped from False-Face's trap and defeated him. False-Face was then arrested by the police. At this point, it was discovered that the unpleasant face he usually presented was not false at all. (Note: Mort Weisinger (w), Creig Flessel (a). "Mystery of the Clowning Criminals" Leading Comics, no. 2 (spring 1942). DC Comics.) Much later, he confronts the Star-Spangled Kid. (Note: Jon Small (a)"Adventure Express" Star Spangled Comics, no. 68 (May 1947). DC Comics.)

=== Second Golden Age version ===
- Further reading: False Face at the Grand Comics Database

A different version dies in a confrontation with Captain Marvel Jr. (Note: Mac Raboy (a)"The Real Face of False Face" Captain Marvel Jr., no. 29 (April 1948). Fawcett Publications.) While not the same character as created for DC, the publisher would later license and eventually purchase the characters and stories that Fawcett published. The material would be assigned to "Earth-S" within the continuity of the DC Universe.

=== Silver Age version ===
The late 1950s version of the character, created by an uncredited writer and Sheldon Moldoff, appeared once in Batman #113.

Little is known of the Caped Crusaders' first meeting with the villain in Gotham City. During Batman's second chance encounter, it's revealed that he had impersonated the wealthy uranium tycoon P.S. Smithington. As Smithington, False-Face robbed a jewelry store, framing the true Smithington for the crime. Batman managed to rescue the actual Smithington, but was unable to recover the stolen jewels. At police headquarters, Commissioner James Gordon supplied Batman and Robin with information about the case and the two gave chase. This time, False-Face kidnapped rock star Wally Weskit during a charity benefit concert and concealed him in an elevator shaft. As False-Face assumed the form of Weskit, his henchman Pebbles attempted to make off with the charity proceeds. Batman and Robin managed to prevent this, but False-Face and his gang escaped. The third time that False-Face struck, he impersonated the safari hunter Arthur Crandall to get into the Gotham City Explorer Club. While attempting to steal the club's Golden Tiger Trophy, Batman and Robin arrived and were on his heels again. He lured Batman towards a large water tank and managed to temporarily trap him, but the Dark Knight detective succeeded in outsmarting False Face and his men, apprehending the entire group in the process. False Face was taken to prison and subsequently retired. (Note: Sheldon Moldoff (a)"The Menace of False Face" Batman, no. 113 (February 1958).)

=== Modern Age version ===
- First appearance: Birds of Prey #112 (January 2008)
- Further reading: Falseface at the Comic Book DB (archived from the original); Falseface at the Grand Comics Database

The late 2000s version of the character, created by Tony Bedard and David Cole, first appeared in Birds of Prey #112 (January 2008).

She and White Star targeted Lady Blackhawk so that False-Face can take her place in Barbara Gordon's organization. Zinda managed to elude them with the help of her taxi driver Mahoud. (Note: Tony Bedard (w), David Cole (p), Doug Hazlewood (i). "The Warrior Wake of Zinda Blake" Birds of Prey, no. 112 (January 2008). DC Comics.)

=== False Face in other media ===
- False Face appears in Batman (1966), portrayed by Malachi Throne.
- False Face appears in Batman '66 #23, in which his real name is revealed to be Basil Karlo before he obtains a special formula that transforms him into Clayface.
- False-Face appears in the Batman Beyond episode "Plague", voiced by Townsend Coleman. This version has the ability to assume anyone's identity by altering his face, which he achieved through years of genetic manipulation and surgery. Kobra hires him to smuggle a deadly virus into Gotham City to infect its citizens and ransom the city, turning him into a carrier as a backup plan. False-Face attempts to evade Batman and Stalker, only to succumb to and die from the virus.
- False-Face appears in Batman: The Brave and the Bold, voiced by Corey Burton. This version resembles the Batman (1966) incarnation.

== Fast Track ==
Fast Track (Meena Dhawan) is a character in DC Comics. Created by Joshua Williamson, Paul Pelletier and Howard Porter, she first appeared in The Flash (vol. 5) #3 (September 2016), as Fast Track in The Flash (vol. 5) #5 (October 2016), and as the Negative Flash in The Flash (vol. 5) #34 (January 2018).

Dhawan is the director of S.T.A.R. Labs' Central City branch which is involved in training speedsters, such as Avery Ho and Ace West, and additionally possesses speedster abilities herself due to a Speed Force storm in Central City. She briefly dated Barry Allen while having encounters with Joseph Carver of Black Hole before being seemingly killed by Godspeed.

However, Dhawan returns after being revived and powered by the Negative Speed Force and brainwashed by Gorilla Grodd and Raijin, fighting The Flash and Kid Flash. Dhawan helped generate the Negative Speed Force storm as Black Hole's enforcer before being freed by The Flash, helping restore Central City back to normal, and willingly surrendering herself to Iron Heights Penitentiary.

She is among the speedsters who help to fight the Reverse-Flash and the Legion of Zoom.

=== Fast Track in other media ===
Meena Dhawan / Fast Track appears in the eighth season of The Flash, portrayed by Kausar Mohammed. This version is the CEO of Fast Track Laboratories who is in love with Eobard Thawne's time remnant. The two create the Biometric Lightning Oscillation Chamber (BLOC) to grant her super-speed, though the device unintentionally connects her to the Negative Speed Force before Thawne and Barry Allen save her. Dhawan later helps Allen and Team Flash fight the Negative Forces.

== Fauna Faust ==
Fauna Faust

Publication information
- Publisher: DC Comics
- First appearance: Outsiders (vol. 2) #16 (March 1995)

In-story information
- Species: Homo magi
- Team affiliations: Kobra Cult; Strikeforce Kobra
- Notable aliases: Faust
- Abilities: Dark magic; Expertise in thievery

Fauna Faust, commonly known as Fauna, is a supervillain published by DC Comics and debuted in the 1993 Outsiders series. She is the daughter of Felix Faust and younger sibling of Sebastian Faust. Like her brother, she suffered abuse from Felix and also had her soul sold, only gaining power to influence animals and the power to use magic without demonic assistance. She is also openly a lesbian.

She would become a member of Kobra Cult's elite strike force, the Strike Force Kobra and secretly work alongside her father as an enemy of both her brother and the second incarnation of the Outsiders superhero team while also being a secret confidante her father. During her time within Strikeforce Kobra, she entered a relationship with fellow supervillain, the fourth Syonide. She would meet her brother once more and the Outsiders and battles the team, losing her lover after Eradicator kills her. She is then called forth by her father and punished due to blowing her role as a surprise weapon against the Outsiders. She later assist her father in battling the Outsider though Felix is defeated and Fauna is free from the influences of her father.

Eventually, the character would reappear in DC Universe series, Raven: Daughter of Darkness. This version is a thief who is later killed by the Shadow Riders.

== Featherweight ==
Featherweight (Alya Raatko) is a character in DC Comics. Created by Greg Rucka and Nicola Scott, she first appeared in Cheetah and Cheshire Rob the Justice League #2 (September 2025). She is the daughter of supervillain Nyssa Raatko and a granddaughter of Ra's al Ghul. She is a political activist with superstrength and was recruited to the team of supervillains Cheetah and Cheshire. She is transgender and bisexual.

== Carl Ferris ==
- First appearance: Showcase #2 (October 1959)
- Created by: John Broome and Gil Kane

Carl Ferris is the founder of Ferris Aircraft, an aerospace/defense manufacturer based out of Coast City. One of his best pilots, Martin Jordan (the father of Hal Jordan), was killed in an accident, which caused him great guilt. He is the father of Carol Ferris who took over the company after he retired.

=== Carl Ferris in other media ===
Carl Ferris appears in Green Lantern, portrayed by Jay O. Sanders.

== Fever ==
Fever (Shyleen Lao) was a Chinese American member of the corporatized Doom Patrol formed by eccentric millionaire Thayer Jost. After the team disbanded, Fever remained slightly active in the superhero community. She, and several of her Doom Patrol teammates, attended the mass for fallen and missing superheroes in the series Infinite Crisis.

Fever is later seen in a holding cell next to Miss Martian and Kid Devil as one of the brainwashed captives of the Dark Side Club. Miss Martian attempts to break her out, but Fever has already been brainwashed into loyalty.

In the series Terror Titans, Fever is put into a match with Ravager. Ravager wins and Fever is sentenced to death, but Ravager refuses to kill her. Fever is then killed by an operative of the Dark Side Club.

=== Fever in other media ===
- Shyleen Lao appears in the Titans episode "Doom Patrol", portrayed by Hina Abdullah. This version is an activist who gained the ability to manipulate temperature after being exposed to liquid nitrogen during an explosion, after which the Chief takes her in to help her control her powers.
- Fever appears as a character summon in Scribblenauts Unmasked: A DC Comics Adventure.

== Milton Fine ==
Milton Fine is a character appearing in American comic books published by DC Comics. The character, created by John Byrne and Jerry Ordway, first appeared in Adventures of Superman vol. 1 #438 (March 1988).

He is a circus performer with psychic abilities who was possessed by Brainiac. Superman is able to defeat Fine and have him remanded to a psychiatric hospital. However, Brainiac manages to regain control of Fine and transform his body to resemble a Coluan.

In the "House of Brainiac" storyline, Brainiac recruits Fine to join the Brainiacs of the Omniverse/Council of Light as part of his plans to create the Brainiac Queen.

=== Milton Fine in other media ===
- A variation of Milton Fine appears in Smallville as an alias used by Brainiac (portrayed by James Marsters).
- Milton Fine appears in Superman & Lois, portrayed by Nikolai Witschl. This version is merely nicknamed "Brainiac" and is an inventor/hacker of LuthorCorp and ally of Lex Luthor.

== Firehair ==
Firehair is a character appearing in American comic books published by DC Comics.

Firehair was the sole survivor of a wagon train massacre sometime in the 19th century. He was adopted by the Blackfoot Chief, Grey Cloud, who named him Firehair due to his bright red hair. He was created by Joe Kubert.

== Firehawk ==
Firehawk is the name of two characters appearing in American comic books published by DC Comics.

=== Lorraine Reilly ===
The daughter of Senator Walter Reilly, Lorraine Reilly was kidnapped and transformed by Multiplex at the behest of industrialist Henry Hewitt, who wanted to recreate the accident that had created Firestorm. Hewitt's experiments gave her the ability to generate intense heat and fiery wings that enable her to fly. Hewitt used the data he had gathered to transform himself into the villain Tokamak. Brainwashed into attacking Firestorm, Firehawk was defeated, after which she soon reverted to her usual self, remembering little of what had happened. She was later jogged into becoming Firehawk again, but this time as a hero.

Some time after the events of Infinite Crisis, Lorraine takes her father's seat on the Senate, becoming the junior senator of New York. Additionally, she becomes Jason Rusch's partner in the Firestorm matrix after Martin Stein disappears. When the two are separated, Lorraine can still use her powers as Firehawk on her own. However, if Lorraine and Jason are separated by a distance of more than a mile, Lorraine loses her powers, while Jason manifests uncontrollable blasts of energy.

=== Second version ===
A second version of Firehawk later appears as the Firestorm of France.

=== Powers and abilities of Firehawk ===
Firehawk has a wide array of thermal and radioactive powers. She can create bird-like wings of atomic flame and fly at high speeds. She can fire blasts of fiery thermal energy or bursts of searing radiation. She can lower her molecular density to the point that she can fly through solid matter. She can even manipulate energy fields, such as draining stolen energy back from Parasite. In Crisis on Infinite Earths, she is shown creating a new costume for herself by rearranging molecules.

=== Firehawk in other media ===
The Lorraine Reilly incarnation of Firehawk appears as a character summon in Scribblenauts Unmasked: A DC Comics Adventure.

== Fisherman ==
Fisherman is the name of several characters appearing in American comic books published by DC Comics.

=== Kurt Hartmann ===
Kurt Hartmann is a fisherman-themed criminal and an enemy of Doctor Mid-Nite.

=== Second version ===
The second Fisherman's real identity has never been revealed. The character's modus operandi is mainly involved with stealing and selling technology.

The concept and first character, created by Joe Greene and Stan Aschmeier, first appeared in All-American Comics #69 (November–December 1945) as a single-use thief in the Doctor Mid-Nite strip. The name was reused for a single appearance character in Blackhawk #163 (August 1961), and later for a character that became a recurring opponent of Aquaman.

Within the context of the stories, this latter Fisherman is originally presented as an unidentified international criminal specializing in the theft of rare objects and scientific inventions. He utilizes a high tech pressure suit, collapsible fishing rod, and gimmick "lures" in his crimes. While his identity is never revealed, enough is known about him for the Gotham City coroner to state that a man wearing a copy of his equipment that is killed in Gotham is not the same person who faced Aquaman.

The Fisherman is one of the many supervillains to take advantage of the "villain-friendly" atmosphere of Zandia. He becomes involved in a large confrontation when Young Justice leads a superpowered army against the country for various reasons.

=== Impostor ===
In Infinite Crisis #1 (2005), the Fisherman, along with the Riddler, the Body Doubles, Scavenger, Red Panzer, and Murmur attack Gotham police officers in Cathedral Square.

The attack is elaborated upon in the series Gotham Central. After a magical accident devastates Gotham, the villain goes on a rampage. Over the prone forms of other officers, the Fisherman confronts Renee Montoya and Crispus Allen. While strangling Allen, the Fisherman is shot dead by Detectives Marcus Driver and Josephine MacDonald; Allen and Montoya survive. During an autopsy, it is revealed that the dead man is not the original villain of that name.

=== Xenoform ===
A new, more deadly version of the villain appears in Aquaman: Sword of Atlantis #48-49 (2007), written by Kurt Busiek. The Fisherman's helmet is revealed to be a parasitic alien that uses telepathy to instill fear in its victims.

=== Fisherman in other media ===
- The second version of Fisherman appears in The Superman/Aquaman Hour of Adventure.
- The second version of Fisherman appears in Batman: The Brave and the Bold, voiced by Dee Bradley Baker.
- The Flashpoint incarnation of the Fisherman appears in Justice League: The Flashpoint Paradox.
- The second version of Fisherman appears in Aquaman: King of Atlantis, voiced by Regi Davis.
- The second version of Fisherman appears as a character summon in Scribblenauts Unmasked: A DC Comics Adventure.
- The second version of Fisherman makes a non-speaking appearance in the Creature Commandos episode "Cheers to the Tin Man".

== Arnold Flass ==
Arnold John Flass is a character appearing in American comic books published by DC Comics. He first appeared in Batman #404 (February 1987).

Flass is a corrupt police detective who worked with Jim Gordon when he first arrived in Gotham City. He has worked with drug dealer Jefferson Skeevers, crime boss Carmine Falcone, and police commissioner Gillian B. Loeb. In the storyline Batman: Dark Victory, Flass is murdered by the Hangman killer. Flass returned in the series Gotham Central (2026).

=== Arnold Flass in other media ===
- Arnold Flass appears in Gotham, portrayed by Dash Mihok. This version is a narcotics detective who works with Jim Gordon and Harvey Bullock.
- Arnold Flass appears in Batman: Caped Crusader, voiced by Gary Anthony Williams. This version is African American.
- Arnold Flass appears in Batman Begins, portrayed by Mark Boone Junior. This version indirectly works with Dr. Jonathan Crane and the League of Shadows. When Ra's al Ghul unleashes fear gas on Gotham, Flass is infected before being restrained by Jim Gordon, leading to his arrest.
- Arnold Flass appears in Batman: Year One, voiced by Fred Tatasciore.
- Arnold Flass appears in the video game adaptation of Batman Begins, voiced by Mark Boone Junior.
- Arnold Flass, based on his Batman Begins design, appears in Lego Batman: Legacy of the Dark Knight.

== Fly ==
Fly is the name of several characters appearing in American comic books published by DC Comics.

=== Tarantula villain ===
Fly is a fly-themed villain and an enemy of Tarantula.

== Fog ==
Fog is the name of several characters appearing in American comic books published by DC Comics.

=== Nebel ===
Nebel is a German operative who was given powers by the Nazis and fought the All-Star Squadron.

=== Byron Shelley ===
Byron Shelley was a member of the Brotherhood of Dada who gained the ability to turn into a psychedelic death cloud capable of absorbing people, becoming known as the Fog. The people he absorbed could still communicate, and the voices started to drive him mad. After he absorbed Doom Patrol member Crazy Jane, she and her multiple personalities traumatized the people inside him and the Fog vomited her out.

=== Sandman villain ===
A third incarnation of Fog is introduced in The New Golden Age series Wesley Dodds: The Sandman. He is an unidentified criminal who wields a corrupted version of Wesley Dodds' attire and sleeping gas. Fog later falls out of the window during a battle with Dodds and lands on a car. After being presumed dead, Fog resurfaces in the present as a member of the Injustice Society. In the ensuing battle with the Justice Society, Wotan steals the Helmet of Fate from Khalid Nassour and teleports Fog and the other villains away.

=== Fog in other media ===
- Byron Shelley appears in Superboy. This version is a vampire and the son of Dracula.
- A genderbent version of Byron Shelley, Shelley Byron, appears in the third season of Doom Patrol, portrayed by Wynn Everett.

== Folded Man ==
Folded Man is the name of two characters appearing in American comic books published by DC Comics.

=== Edwin Gauss ===
The Folded Man was once Edwin Gauss, a physics student at M.I.T. looking to resolve Albert Einstein's Unified field theory. In doing so, he created an exoskeleton that allows him to travel across dimensions.

An irate Bridges, who considers the exoskeleton Gauss developed (using Bridges' software) to be his own property, pursues Gauss to claim the technology for himself. Gauss reinvents himself as a costumed criminal named "the Folded Man". His new criminal career brings him into conflict with Wally West.

In Infinite Crisis, Folded Man joins Alexander Luthor Jr.'s Secret Society of Super Villains.

=== Xolani ===
In 1883, a South African thief named Xolani became a conduit of the Speed Force, gaining the ability to contort his body into different shapes, flatten himself, phase through solid objects, and teleport by bending space-time for a certain period of time. It was through his space-time bending that he ended up in the present day, where he battles the Flash.

=== Folded Man in other media ===
- The Edwin Gauss incarnation of Folded Man appears as a character summon in Scribblenauts Unmasked: A DC Comics Adventure.
- The Edwin Gauss incarnation of Folded Man appears in The Flash episode "Lose Yourself", portrayed by Arturo Del Puerto. This version is a hippie who gained his abilities after the Thinker tricked The Flash into exposing him to dark matter so the former can kill Gauss for his powers.

== James Forrest ==
James Forrest is a character appearing in DC Comics. The character, created by Geoff Johns and Ethan Van Sciver, first appeared in The Flash: Rebirth #2 (July 2009). He is a CSI colleague of Barry Allen.

=== James Forrest in other media ===
James Forrest appears in Justice League: The Flashpoint Paradox, voiced by Kevin Michael Richardson.

== Derek Fox ==
- First appearance: The Flash (vol. 2) #197 (June 2003)
- Created by: Geoff Johns and Scott Kolins

Derek Fox is a character appearing in DC Comics. He first appeared in The Flash (vol. 2) #197 (June 2003), and was created by Geoff Johns and Scott Kolins.

Derek Fox was the mentor of Hunter Zolomon / Zoom and the father of Ashley Zolomon. They worked as F.B.I. specialists involving low-level costumed criminals until Hunter's inadvertent mistake due to believing the Clown was incapable of using a gun, resulting in Fox's death as well as his protégé's belief in psychological tragedy.

=== Derek Fox in other media ===
An original alternate universe character, James Zolomon, appears in The Flash episode "Versus Zoom", portrayed by Shaine Jones. This version is the father of Hunter Zolomon as well as a veteran of the War of the Americas who murdered Ashley Zolomon which traumatized their son.

== Bride of Frankenstein ==
The Bride of Frankenstein is a character appearing in American comic books published by DC Comics. The character first appeared in Seven Soldiers: Frankenstein #3 (April 2006) and was created by writer Grant Morrison and artist Doug Mahnke. She is adapted from the literary character of the same name.

The Bride's history that includes her creation at the hands of Victor Frankenstein is roughly the same as her namesake. She wandered the Earth after assuming that her creator and Frankenstein died in the Arctic Circle. Many years later, the villain Red Swami brainwashes the Bride and grafts two arms to her to pass her off as an unidentified four-armed goddess. After being subdued by agents of S.H.A.D.E., the Bride joins the group. She states to Frankenstein "It's nothing personal, but you were never my type".

In 2011, "The New 52" rebooted the DC universe. The Bride is first seen investigating disappearances in Washington, D.C. before going missing. Frankenstein is paired up with the Creature Commandos members Warren Griffith, Vincent Velcro, Nina Mazursky, and Khalis to locate the Bride and eventually find her fighting off an endless horde of monsters.

A flashback reveals that the Bride previously had a loving relationship with Frankenstein and fathered a son. Unfortunately, the Spawn of Frankenstein became homicidal and Frankenstein was forced to kill him, straining his relationship with the Bride. In the present, Frankenstein and the Bride find that the Spawn of Frankenstein was resurrected by Father Time and locked in S.H.A.D.E.'s headquarters until it broke out. Tracing their child to Castle Frankenstein, the Spawn of Frankenstein does not want to reason with his parents and convinces them to kill him. The Bride obliges and leaves S.H.A.D.E. afterwards.

=== Other versions ===
An alternate timeline version of the Bride appears in Flashpoint: Frankenstein and the Creatures of the Unknown. This version is a S.H.A.D.E. agent.

=== Bride of Frankenstein in other media ===
The Bride appears in Creature Commandos, voiced by Indira Varma. This version was created in 1831 at the request of Victor Frankenstein's creature, Eric, who believed himself to be entitled to her affection without regard for her opinion or desire to form her own identity. When the Bride and Victor fell in love, Eric killed Victor, then spent centuries stalking the Bride. In the present, the Bride becomes a member, later leader, of the Creature Commandos.

== Young Frankenstein ==
Young Frankenstein is a character appearing in American comic books published by DC Comics.

Little is known about the origin of Young Frankenstein. At one point, Young Frankenstein was a member of the Teen Titans in-between the events of "Infinite Crisis" and "One Year Later". A picture of him clearly shows him as a younger version of the famous Frankenstein, another DC Comics character based on the famous monster and a member of the Seven Soldiers of Victory. What the connection is between the two has yet to be explained.

He finally made an appearance during the World War III event where he and the other Teen Titans tried to help stop a rampaging Black Adam. The group confronts the murderer at the Greek Parthenon. Zatara is badly injured. Young Frankenstein grabs Black Adam, who then rips off his arms. At that point the Titans leave their wounded to the care of rapidly approaching Greek authorities. Martian Manhunter, disguised as a medical worker, goes into Young Frankenstein's mind and learns that he is still alive and in great pain. Martian Manhunter soothes his mind, staying with him until his death.

In the DC Infinite Halloween Special, Victor Zsasz revealed the final fate of Young Frankenstein in a tale called "...In Stitches". As his remains were being carried away in a helicopter, it was struck by lightning. His body was blown to bits, and the individual pieces began moving on their own, killing anyone in their path for new flesh. Young Frankenstein was finally able to pull himself back together in Albania and began walking on the bottom of the Ionian Sea with a need for revenge.

In Terror Titans, Young Frankenstein, whose final story is now revealed to be true and not a fabricated Halloween tale, is one of the imprisoned heroes forced to fight on the behest of the Apokoliptan gods on Earth in the Dark Side Club. After being rescued from the club by Miss Martian, Young Frankenstein is offered a spot on the new Teen Titans roster, but declines.

== Freight Train ==
Freight Train is the name of two characters appearing in American comic books published by DC Comics.

=== Cecil ===
Cecil (last name unknown) is a man who gained the ability to absorb kinetic energy after being bitten by a Bloodlines parasite. After working as a mercenary, Cecil comes to work for Simon Stagg, who intends to have him kill the Outsiders. When it becomes apparent that Stagg will have him killed as well, Freight Train defects to the Outsiders and helps them fight Java, who Stagg empowered with the ability to become a Shaggy Man.

=== Eric Moran ===
In 2011, "The New 52" rebooted the DC universe; Eric Moran is a member of the Outsiders who has the same abilities as Cecil.

=== Freight Train in other media ===
A genderbent version of the Eric Moran version of Freight Train, Erica Moran, appears in Black Lightning, portrayed by Gabriella Garcia. This version is a metahuman prisoner of the A.S.A.

== Frenzy ==
Frenzy (Lloyd Malcolm Jefferson) was a member of the Brotherhood of Dada gathered by Mr. Nobody, otherwise known as Frenzy. An illiterate man of Jamaican-American descent whose mother had abandoned him, he wore a garish outfit covered with symbols, a top hat with a green flower, and two bicycle wheels on his back. He could turn into a living cyclone.

=== Frenzy in other media ===
Frenzy appears in the third season of Doom Patrol, portrayed by Miles Mussenden.

== Fuerza ==
Fuerza (Alexa Antigone) is an anarchist who is a conduit of the Strength Force which she derives superhuman physical abilities and gravity manipulation, similar to Steadfast and Psych. Fuerza encounters Barry Allen and Iris West while trying to free Corto Maltese from a corrupt government, but nearly kills its leader before Antigone's mother convinces her to stop.

=== Fuerza in other media ===
Alexa Rivera / Fuerza appears in The Flash, portrayed by Sara Garcia. This version is a medical volunteer who possesses the additional ability of energy absorption. Introduced in the seventh season, she experiences difficulty controlling her abilities until she receives help from Caitlin Snow and Killer Frost. Afterwards, Fuerza helps Barry Allen, Psych and Deon Owens subdue the Speed Force and restore balance. In the eighth season, Rivera falls ill with a time sickness to which the Negative Strength Force steals her likeness until she recovers.
