= War for Earth-3 =

2022 DC Comics crossover event

- Publisher: DC Comics
- Publication date: March 1 – March 29 2022
- Genre: Superhero
Title(s)
War for Earth-3 #1-2, Suicide Squad #13, Flash #780, Teen Titans Academy #13
- Main character(s): Crime Syndicate of America, Teen Titans, Suicide Squad, Wally West

Creative team
- Writer(s): Robbie Thompson, Dennis Hopeless and Jeremy Adams
- Artist(s): Steve Pugh, Dexter Soy, Eduardo Pasarin, Pasarin and Matt Ryan

"War for Earth-3" is a 2022 crossover event in DC Comics publications. Written by Robbie Thompson, Dennis Hopeless and Jeremy Adams, the story follows a conflict between the Suicide Squad, Crime Syndicate of America, Teen Titans, and Flash as Amanda Waller creates a plan to have an everlasting Suicide Squad. The story appeared in five issues spread across three comic titles published over five weeks in March 2022. The event received mixed reviews from critics, with critics praising the story and action but criticizing the art and characters, particularly the Crime Syndicate.

== Publication history ==
"War for Earth-3" storyline was teased at the end of 2021, when it was revealed that DC Comics would create a crossover event featuring the Teen Titans, Suicide Squad, Crime Syndicate and Flash that will deal with Amanda Waller trying to exert her influence over the DC Multiverse.

== Plot summary ==
=== Prelude ===
Bloodsport is hired by Amanda Waller to recruit more alternate universes of Suicide Squad in Earth-3 when he sees Ultraman, Owlman, Superwoman, and Emerald Knight (an evil version of John Stewart) terrorizing civilians. Bloodsport attacks Black Siren (an evil version of Black Canary) when Ultraman arrives and nearly kills him. Back on Earth-Prime, Waller's Suicide Squad (Talon, Nocturna, Match, Culebra, Ambush Bug, and Major Force) are training, with Waller still not trusting Peacemaker for letting Rick Flag escape. Waller sends the Suicide Squad to Earth-3 where they fight the Crime Syndicate of America. The Suicide Squad rescues Bloodsport and kidnaps Black Siren before going back to Russia, where they meet Conner Kent.

Rick Flag and Amanda Waller had a fallout because Waller sees Suicide Squad as disposable and wants to create a new Justice League to take over the world, which causes Waller to imprison Flag, but Peacemaker frees him. Match and Conner fight while Bloodsport and Nocturna investigate and learn that Amanda Waller created Match by cloning Conner. Waller teleports the Suicide Squad members away, and Flag decides to recruit his own team starting with Mirror Master, and it's revealed that Talon is a mole in the Suicide Squad.

While the Suicide Squad deals with Sojourner Mullein (a Green Lantern) and Hellsquad with Rick Flag recruiting Cheetah, Peacemaker, Lor-Zod and a Parademon to take down Amanda Waller. Waller has been gathering a group of superpowered villains to take over Earth-3, and Peacemaker asks Bloodsport on why is he still working with Waller. Waller sends the Suicide Squad to Earth-8, where they fight the Retaliators (Purple Rain, Behemoth, American Crusader, Hunda Jin, Red Dragon, LadyBug and Machinehead). Bloodsport and Peacemaker fight, with Bloodsport revealing he is still working for Waller because she has his brothers from different universes, and she has planted bombs in his brothers in case Bloodsport rebels against her. Bloodsport defeats Peacemaker, but spares him after Peacemaker tells him something, which causes Bloodsport joins Rick Flag's group. The Suicide Squad defeats the Retaliators, but are confronted by The Lightning Strikes (Thrill Kill, Thing Man, Dead Red, Oedipus, and Blood Pouch).

Agent Parker asks Amanda Waller to retreat, but Waller stands her ground and wants to kill Dr. Rodriguez after realizing Rodriguez is working with Rick Flag. Major Force betrays the Suicide Squad and starts fighting them, but Black Siren kills him. Waller tries to detonate the bomb in Black Siren's skull, but Rodriguez disabled it. Waller is disappointed with how the Suicide Squad acted on Earth-8, and teleports Match to her due to her disgust with Match gaining emotions and feelings for Nocturna. Flag confronts Waller, but Waller reveals she employed Clayface, and plans to go to Earth-3 with her soldiers, Match, Black Hand and Black Siren.

=== Main plot ===
Emerald Knight hosts a party for Ultraman, but Ultraman grows impatient and kills everyone in the party. While in space, Ultraman sees Amanda Waller arriving on his Earth, and sees Superwoman being a dominatrix to Owlman and gets angry so he confronts her and Owlman. Emerald Knight confronts Waller's team, but is defeated by Black Hand. Owlman goes out to fight Waller's team to save Emerald Knight, but his plane is taken down by Black Siren. Waller calls Ultraman from Emerald Knight's ring, and Superwoman and Ultraman go to confront her. Dr. Rodriguez injects her with a serum to save Rick Flag's team, and they all travel to confront Waller, but are shocked when Waller has convinced Ultraman and Emerald Knight to join her side.

Rick Flag's team is forced to retreat, and Dr. Rodriguez is captured by Amanda Waller while Match and Nocturna are sent to Hell by Etrigan the Demon. Talon and Culbera travels back to Earth-3's Gotham City. Culbera is killed by Johnny Quick and takes over Owlman's body. Ambush Bug transports Peacemaker to Owlman's Fortress of Solitude to find a weapon to stop Owlman when they are confronted by Superwoman who wants to kill Ultraman and Waller for what they did to Owlman. Quick rushes in and gets the secret weapon while Black Siren attacks the Fortress of Solitude.

Johnny Quick arrives on Earth-Prime to get the Cosmic Treadmill. After Wally West returns from his recent adventure with his children, Wally learns that Linda Park has developed superspeed. Wally hears that Quick is trying to find the Cosmic Treadmill from orders of Amanda Waller, but Mirror Master appears and tries to destroy the Cosmic Treadmill. It is revealed that Quick was trapped in the Speed Force but Waller and Etrigan freed him, with Quick getting the Cosmic Treadmill and disappearing. Raven tries to heal Cyborg and Beast Boy after Red X injured them in a previous battle, but they are interrupted by Rick Flag and Harley Quinn from Earth-8. Nightwing, Starfire, Donna Troy, Roy Harper, and Wally West decide to go help out the Suicide Squad, but unbeknownst to them Emiko Queen and a couple of their students sneak in their ship.

Rick Flag's Suicide Squad and the Teen Titans fight the Crime Syndicate on Earth-3 while Amanda Waller captures Emiko Queen and the Titans students. Superwoman saves Peacemaker and Ambush Bug, who goes off to fight Ultraman, who is convinced by Flag that Waller is using him as a puppet because her true plans is to remove Earth-3 from the DC Multiverse. Waller tells the Teen Titans to stand down and promises to teleport the Teen Titans and their students away from Earth-3 as she deems them innocent people who are not involved in this. Ultraman nearly kills Superwoman, but is stopped by Ambush Bug and Mirror Master. Rick Flag, Bloodsport, and Peacemaker shoot Ultraman, which gives Emerald Knight enough time to send Ultraman into the Phantom Zone. Waller teleports the rest of the Suicide Squad back to Earth-Prime and creates her own Justice League (Match, Earth-3 Black Canary, Nocturna, Etrigan, Johnny Quick and Superwoman).

== Critical reception ==
According to Comic Book Roundup, War for Earth-3 #1 received an average rating of 6.8 out of 10 based on 10 reviews.

According to Comic Book Roundup, Suicide Squad #13 received an average rating of 7.6 out of 10 based on 6 reviews.

According to Comic Book Roundup, The Flash #780 received an average rating of 8.6 out of 10 based on 7 reviews.

According to Comic Book Roundup, Teen Titans Academy #13 received an average rating of 7.6 out of 10 based on 6 reviews.

According to Comic Book Roundup, War for Earth-3 #2 received an average rating of 5.7 out of 10 based on 5 reviews.

== Collected edition ==
Title	Material collected	Published date	ISBN
War for Earth-3	The Flash #780, Suicide Squad #13, Teen Titans Academy #13, War for Earth-3 #1-2	September 2022	978-1779518033
