= Time Masters =

Time Masters may refer to

- The Time Masters, a science fiction novel by Wilson Tucker
- Time Masters, a 1995 novel by Gary Blackwood
- Les Maîtres du temps, a Franco-Hungarian animated science fiction film
- Time Masters, a DC comic book series starring Rip Hunter
- Time Masters, an organization appearing in Legends of Tomorrow
- Time Masters (game show), a 1996–98 Australian kids game show for Seven Network
