= Eclipso =

- The Bruce Gordon incarnation of Eclipso as depicted in Countdown to Mystery #4 (February 2008). Art by Stephen Jorge Segovia.

Publication information
- Publisher: DC Comics
- First appearance: House of Secrets #61 (August 1963)
- Created by: Bob Haney; Lee Elias

In-story information
- Alter ego: Kaala (current); Galid (former)
- Species: Ghost
- Place of origin: Gemworld (As Kaala)
- Partnerships: Mordru; Obsidian; Hosts: Bruce Gordon; Alex Montez; Jean Loring
- Notable aliases: Lladiz; Prince of Darkness; Vengeance Demon; The Lord of the No-Man's Land Between Light and Darkness
- Abilities: Spirit possession; Immortality; Energy manipulation; Energy blasts; Superhuman strength, speed and stamina; Invulnerability; Flight; Weather modification; Astronomical object manipulation; Reality warping; Divine siphoning; Nigh-omnipotence; Mass/remote possession; Magical Mastery; Mystical Invulernability; Spell casting; Darkness embodiment; Darkness empowerment; Shadow manipulation; Shadow construct creation; Telepathy; Telekinesis; Teleportation; Time reversal; Corruption inducement; Possession transformation

Eclipso (/ɪˈklɪpsoʊ/) is a supervillain in American comic books published by DC Comics. Created by Bob Haney and Lee Elias, the character first appeared in House of Secrets #61 (August 1963). The character bears notable similarities to Dr. Jekyll and Mr. Hyde.

Eclipso is a powerful magical entity often portrayed as a primordial manifestation of divine wrath, believed to be linked to the wrath of God. Regarded as the Archenemy of the Spectre, Eclipso is considered an Angel of Vengeance. Following his removal from his original position, Eclipso is sometimes associated with the Lords of Chaos as their agent. In the New 52 continuity onward, it is revealed that Eclipso occasionally reincarnates into different lives. One such incarnation is Kaala, also known as the Lord of House Onyx, hailing from Gemworld. Throughout Eclipso's history, Eclipso is frequently depicted as an adversary of the Justice League, its affiliated teams, and Amethyst, Princess of Gemworld. Eclipso is also able to possess others, causing distinctive blue facial markings resembling an "eclipse."

Eclipso appeared as the main antagonist of the second season of The CW television show Stargirl, portrayed as an adult by Nick E. Tarabay and Jason Davis and as a young boy by Milo Stein.

== Publication history ==
Eclipso first appeared in House of Secrets #61 (August 1963) and was created by Bob Haney and Lee Elias.

== Fictional character biography ==
Originally, Eclipso was written as a generic villain who would routinely enact an elaborate plot to fulfill his hedonistic motivations. However, the 1992 Darkness Within miniseries modified Eclipso to be an evil and megalomaniacal entity. Eclipso's character laments the power he once had as a spirit of divine vengeance. Eclipso would frequently seek to possess beings of incredible power like Superman, Lar Gand, and Captain Marvel to achieve his ends.

=== Bruce Gordon ===
Eclipso's early comics debut is tied to his first modern host, Bruce Gordon (named after Bruce Wayne and Commissioner Gordon as an inside joke), a scientist specializing in solar energy. While in the jungle to view a solar eclipse, Gordon is attacked by a tribal sorcerer named Mophir. Before plunging to his death off a cliff, Mophir wounded Gordon with a black diamond, causing him to transform into Eclipso whenever an eclipse occurred. A blue-gray or purple circle covered the rightmost two-thirds of his face, resembling a partial eclipse. Gordon experienced many Jekyll-and-Hyde transformations and misadventures in The House of Secrets. During this period, Eclipso was portrayed as a conventional villain, possessing super strength, partial invulnerability, and eye blasts. Eclipso's transformations were later altered so that any type of natural eclipse, lunar or solar, would cause Eclipso and Gordon to split from one another, while an "artificial eclipse"—an object blocking out a light source—would merely transform Gordon to Eclipso. Any bright flash of light would banish Eclipso back into Gordon's body or reverse the change.

==== Eclipso: The Darkness Within ====
Wonder Woman possessed by Eclipso, art by Joe Quesada.

In the early 1990s, DC retconned Eclipso in a company-wide crossover built around the miniseries Eclipso: The Darkness Within. Eclipso was revealed not simply to be Bruce Gordon's dark half, but a vengeful demon who had possessed Gordon. Eclipso's soul had originally been bound inside a giant black diamond called the "Heart of Darkness" in Africa. A treasure hunter found it in the late 19th century and brought it to London in 1891, where he had a jeweler cut it into 1,000 shards. This weakened the binding spell, allowing Eclipso to possess anyone who became angry while in contact with one of the shards. He was no longer limited to possessing Gordon during an eclipse, but pretended otherwise so that Gordon would not know the truth about the black diamonds.

Over the next 100 years, Eclipso gathered the diamond shards with the intention of destroying them all, freeing his true power. When Lar Gand discovered Eclipso's palace on the moon and wandered inside, it inspired Eclipso to possess all of Earth's heroes and use them towards his ultimate goal, the conquest of Earth and revenge against God for imprisoning him. Eclipso claimed he had spent the last several years "posing as a B-level villain" to remain undetected by Earth's heroes and had limited himself to targeting Gordon for the purpose of quashing Gordon's research into solar science. If Gordon had achieved his goal of making solar energy the planet's primary energy source, any solar-powered device could be used as a weapon against Eclipso.

In the climax of the story, several of Earth's heroes are possessed by Eclipso and transported to the moon during an eclipse. Eclipso absorbs these heroes into his body, gaining their powers. Gordon leads a group of heroes armed with solar weapons to the moon in an attempt to defeat Eclipso once and for all. The absorbed heroes are freed after Will Payton destroys Eclipso's moon base by detonating his own solar-powered body. Eclipso's diamond shards remain on Earth.

==== Eclipso series ====
Following the crossover event, Eclipso appeared in a solo series. He conquered the South American country of Parador by possessing one person at a time. The United States sent an investigation team consisting of Cave Carson, Bruce Gordon, and Gordon's fiancé Mona Bennet. Carson's legs are broken and he is left at the border.

Gordon and Bennet were taken on a tour and shown various atrocities, such as piles of children's corpses. They escaped with the assistance of the Creeper and formed a group of heroes dubbed the Shadow Fighters. This group was led by Amanda Waller, formerly of the Suicide Squad. In issue #13 of the series, Eclipso confronts the group, killing Wildcat, Doctor Mid-Nite, Commander Steel, Manhunter, and Major Victory.

Elipso attacks the survivors with a Parador missile, which they evade using Nightshade's teleportation ability. During the escape, Bennet's father is snatched from their vehicle, but survives. The survivors arrive in the United Nations building, just in time to foil another plot of Eclipso by landing their vehicle on his intended victim.

Eclipso is finally defeated when the Phantom Stranger gathered all 1,000 black diamond shards and fused them into the Heart of Darkness, imprisoning Eclipso again. His physical body, the adult child of Bennet and Gordon, evaporates in front of his parents.

==== The Spectre (vol. 3) ====
In the series The Spectre (vol. 3), it is revealed that the Spectre was not the first embodiment of the wrath of God, but was Eclipso's replacement. Series writer John Ostrander chose to portray this as a distinction between the Spectre's pursuit of "vengeance" and Eclipso's pursuit of "revenge". In a Biblical context, Eclipso was responsible for Noah's Flood, while the Spectre was the Angel of Death who killed the first-born Egyptian children.

The Spectre destroys the Heart of Darkness, along with the remains of Eclipso's palace on the moon, burning them to ash and casting the ashes into outer space.

=== Alex Montez ===
Alex Montez as Eclipso, art by John Watson.

Eclipso returns after several years' absence in the "Princes of Darkness" storyline in JSA as an ally of the other villains Mordru and Obsidian. Alexander Montez, cousin of Wildcat, vows revenge on Eclipso for her death. To this end, he gathers the 1,000 black diamonds, liquefies them and injects them into himself; all save one, which he keeps to evoke Eclipso. Exactly how Eclipso's diamonds had returned was unknown. Montez covers his body in tribal tattoos he claims he had learned about on Diablo Island. With these tattoos, Montez can summon all the powers of Eclipso by triggering the diamond with his anger, while remaining in control of himself and keeping Eclipso trapped within. As the new Eclipso, he joins the short-lived team of loose-cannon heroes assembled by Black Adam, which was the subject of the subsequent storyline "Black Reign".

During Adam's reign in Kahndaq, Alex becomes romantically involved with his teammate Soseh Mykros, also known as Nemesis. During the battle, one of Alex's binding glyphs (which keeps Eclipso in control) is broken via a shoulder wound. Eclipso soon kills Nemesis. Alex commits suicide to prevent Eclipso from controlling him further.

=== "Lightning Strikes Twice" ===
Despite the loss of the other black diamonds, Eclipso tries to possess Superman by antagonizing him through many deaths. He eventually possesses Superman by upsetting him via his possession of Lois Lane. At this point, the wizard Shazam steps in by sending Captain Marvel to fight the possessed Superman. Thanks to Superman's weakness to magic, Captain Marvel is able to do a significant amount of damage to Eclipso.

Shazam removes Eclipso from Superman by calling upon the hostless Spectre to do it. The Spectre forces Eclipso back into a lone black diamond. The Spectre then warns Shazam that he has made an enemy of Eclipso and that the currently-hostless Spectre will no longer be able to defend him, as he lacks the coherence necessary to effectively recall anything beyond his 'mission'. At the end of this series, the black diamond appears in Jean Loring's cell in Arkham Asylum.

=== Jean Loring ===
Jean Loring as Eclipso, art by Justiniano.

In the Day of Vengeance miniseries, Jean Loring discovers the last black diamond in her prison cell, becomes the new Eclipso, and tricks the Spectre into attacking magic-based heroes as her revenge against Shazam. After fending off multiple attacks upon herself, Loring is teleported into orbit around the Sun.

In Infinite Crisis, Alexander Luthor Jr. sends Superboy-Prime to recover the black diamond and. It is revealed that Psycho-Pirate delivered the diamond it to Loring on Luthor's orders and manipulated Eclipso into manipulating the Spectre. This was all done in the interest of breaking down magic into raw magical energy, which Luthor could use for his own ends.

The Spectre, desiring revenge on Eclipso for his manipulations of him during Infinite Crisis, but rendered incapable of taking it owing to his present lack of a host, orders Dibny to punish Eclipso in return for his wife's life. Dibny, realizing that this meant punishing Jean Loring, his wife's murderer, and temporarily granted the power of the Spectre, takes Eclipso back to the point at which she murdered his wife Sue. He restores Loring's sanity, forcing her to relive her murder of Sue Dibny.

Her sanity restored and Eclipso purged out of her, Loring tearfully begs for forgiveness, screaming that she was not acting rationally when she murdered Sue. Dibny, affected by her pleas, his sense of compassion, and his own feelings on watching his wife's death, refuses to complete his pact with the Spectre, returning Eclipso to her orbit around the Sun.

Loring later appears in Blue Beetle (vol. 7) #16, searching for a new host. Having come to the conclusion that her hosts' corrupted souls are the cause of her failures, she tries to possess a baby with great magical potential and a pure, uncorrupted soul. She is foiled in this attempt by Blue Beetle and Traci Thirteen. She even manages to take control of Blue Beetle and grants him his "supreme desire of power", intending to use Blue Beetle to kill the defenders of the baby. To her mortification, this means Blue Beetle's wish, to become a dentist to provide for his family, is fulfilled, which does not benefit her.

Eclipso is seen in Countdown to Final Crisis #38 watching Mary Marvel and plotting to make Mary into her minion. Increasing her anger and suspicions around the other magical beings around her, she manipulates Mary and offers herself as a friend and confidante. After attempting to make her Darkseid's concubine, however, Mary rebels and attempts to kill her.

After discovering Eclipso's manipulation of her, Mary Marvel sacrifices her abilities and attacks Eclipso with all her power, leaving Mary and Loring to fall into the ocean surrounding Themyscira. Loring is last seen sinking into the ocean with a shark approaching and Eclipso returns to inhabit Bruce Gordon, declaring her lost.

==== Rise of Eclipso ====
Eclipso kidnaps Shade, Acrata, Nightshade, Shadow Thief, Bette Noir, and Dark Crow, all of whom possess shadow-based abilities. After brainwashing his captives, Eclipso travels to an extradimensional plane and frees a demonic entity known as Sythunu, who agrees to serve Eclipso. With his small team ready, Eclipso travels to the Emerald City that Alan Scott established on the Moon, intending to capture Jade. After taking over Jade, Eclipso defeats and possesses the Justice League's reserve roster. With the Justice League outnumbered, Eclipso then reveals his ultimate goal is to kill God. Eclipso then tortures Zauriel, attracting the attention of the new Spectre, Crispus Allen. The Spectre arrives on the Moon, where Eclipso ambushes and kills him, absorbing the Spectre's powers. With his newfound abilities, Eclipso reveals that God relies on the collective love of humanity to stay alive, and that by destroying Earth, Eclipso will kill God. Just as the members of the JLA prepare to wage a counterattack, Eclipso destroys the Moon, apparently dooming all life on Earth. After the Atom and Starman break Eclipso's link to his brainwashed slaves, the combined attack Eclipso together, defeating him.

=== The New 52 ===
In 2011, "The New 52" rebooted the DC universe. Eclipso is depicted as the god of vengeance and once again trapped in the Heart of Darkness. A criminal organization working for Kaizen Gamorra tries to steal the item, with Team 7 trying to stop them. During the fight, Slade Wilson is briefly possessed by Eclipso. With the help of Essence, the other heroes manage to trap him again in the black diamond, which is then sent to somewhere safe. Five years later, Catwoman is hired to steal the diamond, now kept in one of A.R.G.U.S.'s custody; she succeeds, although she is affected by the item's magic.

Eclipso is subsequently revealed to be an inhabitant of Gemworld with the powers of House Onyx and House Diamond and was once Kaala of the planet Nilaa. He was trapped in the diamond by the then-Princess of House Amethyst centuries ago. Now possessing Alex Montez, he is sent back to Gemworld by John Constantine, where he seizes control of the two Houses to which he is connected. Seeking revenge on House Amethyst, he is defeated by Princess Amaya and again trapped in the diamond.

Later, the black diamond is delivered to scientist Gordon Jacobs, who has fallen from grace. Using Gordon's rage, Eclipso from inside the gem manipulated him into cutting himself with the gem so he can possess him. After taking his body, Eclipso murders Jonah Bennet, Gordon's partner and father of his fiancé, Mona, who has come to visit Gordon, but after that, Gordon realizes that he was out of control and he must destroy the gem. Eclipso tells him that if he does, he will also kill himself, because they are one and the same now. Eclipso also manipulates and convinces Gordon not to throw away the gem, using Mona as an excuse. Eclipso warns that if the diamond and he are destroyed, the blood bond between them means Gordon will die too. Manipulatively, Eclipso reminds him that with Jonah's death, Gordon must be there to comfort her and soon, Gordon is convinced.

=== DC Rebirth ===
In the storyline Justice League vs. Suicide Squad, Maxwell Lord has Lobo, Johnny Sorrow, Emerald Empress, Rustam, and Doctor Polaris—the original members of the Suicide Squad—to steal the Heart of Darkness from Amanda Waller's base. Using the Heart of Darkness, Lord 'succeeds' in bringing 'peace' across America, but it quickly degenerates into mass hysteria as the crystal corrupts those around him. Waller is able to snap Lord back to his senses and he realizes that the Heart of Darkness is manipulating his power to sow rioting and chaos. Before Waller can help Lord remove the Heart of Darkness, it infects Lord and turns him into a host for Eclipso, leaving only Batman and the Suicide Squad to stand against his Justice League. Eclipso is able to take over most of the Squad by drawing on their darker desires, but Batman and Lobo hold them off long enough for Killer Frost to use her powers to create a prism, perfectly modulated to reflect Superman's heat vision at a frequency that drives Eclipso back.

== Powers and abilities ==
Eclipso is a formidable and powerful spiritual entity, representing the primordial embodiment of God's wrath. Possessing extraordinary abilities, Eclipso's powers are diverse and impressive. Eclipso exhibits attributes such as invulnerability and immortality. Eclipso's vast magical powers enable the performance of godlike feats. These include manipulating the weather and seas, causing natural disasters like floods and thunderstorms. Eclipso can also alter their size, growing to giant proportions, has the ability to emit deadly rays of dark light from his left eye and a powerful burst of paralyzing black light from his right eye by looking through a shard of the Heart of Darkness gem. Furthermore, Eclipso has demonstrated the ability to absorb the powers of the Spectre and project potent energy from their hands, capable of stunning or even killing adversaries. Having once served God, Eclipso possesses the ability to communicate in the angelic language, which encompasses elements of harmony, discordance, vibration, and telepathy. This linguistic skill enhances Eclipso's command over their powers and facilitates communication on a divine level. Eclipso carries a seemingly unbreakable mystical sword and is a considerable swordsman.

Originally, Eclipso's abilities in possession were derived from contact with the Heart of Darkness. In later iterations, Eclipso's possession capabilities have become even more potent. After overtaking Maxwell Lord, his ability to possess and corrupt individuals was significantly amplified. Unlike before, Eclipso no longer requires physical contact with the gem to influence others. He can remotely possess multiple hosts, as long as he can first corrupt them. Moreover, his influence tends to amplify the darker tendencies within those under his control. The individuals he possesses undergo a visible transformation, adopting a more monstrous physical appearance.

=== Heart of Darkness ===
When manifested into his true form, Eclipso often wears the Heart of Darkness on his chest and channels its power. On its own, Eclipso possesses the ability to overshadow individuals who come into contact with the cursed Heart of Darkness gem. Once overshadowed, Eclipso controls the host's powers, manipulates their behavior, and alters their memories to serve his own purposes. Additionally, he can augment his host's existing abilities or grant them new powers, thereby strengthening them.

=== Weaknesses ===
Despite Eclipso's considerable power, he remains bound by the divine laws set by the Presence, and transgressing these bounds can result in severe punishment from the Presence. Additionally, Eclipso has a vulnerability in the form of the Heart of Darkness, which can be used to seal him away. Certain adept practitioners of magic, such as Doctor Fate and Sebastian Faust, have demonstrated the ability to hinder and exorcise Eclipso's possession through the use of specific magical spells and abilities.

== Other versions ==
- The Bruce Gordon incarnation of Eclipso makes a cameo appearance in JLA: The Nail as a prisoner of Cadmus Labs.
- An alternate universe version of Eclipso appears in Justice League 3001.

== In other media ==
=== Television ===
- Eclipso appears in the Justice League two-part episode "Eclipsed". This version is the collective souls of the Ophidians, an evil race of serpentine humanoids who imprisoned themselves in a black diamond called the Heart of Darkness to eventually destroy humanity. In an attempt to fight the Justice League, Eclipso possesses General McCormick and dons Eclipso's original costume worn by Bruce Gordon after being inspired by one of McCormick's colleagues. Eclipso tries to permanently darken the sun and possesses all of the League before they are freed by the Flash and defeat him, with McCormick being left with no knowledge of what happened.
  - Mophir (voiced by Tracey Walter) is depicted as a member of a tribe that guarded the Heart of Darkness and fought the Ophidians whenever they managed to possess a human host.
- The Bruce Gordon incarnation of Eclipso appears in Stargirl, voiced by an uncredited voice actor in the first season and portrayed by Jason Davis and Nick E. Tarabay in the second season respectively, with Milo Stein also portraying a young Gordon. This version of Gordon is a former archaeologist who found the Black Diamond on Devil Island and eventually allowed Eclipso to fully control his body. After killing Charles McNider's daughter, Rebecca, Eclipso encountered the original Justice Society of America (JSA) before Starman killed Gordon and imprisoned Eclipso in the Black Diamond, which the heroes contained in their headquarters until the Injustice Society of America (ISA) attacked them and stole it. In the present, Cindy Burman finds the Black Diamond in the Wizard's storage unit and begins working with Eclipso to form their own version of the ISA called Injustice Unlimited. After recruiting Isaac Bowin and Artemis Crock, they battle Stargirl's JSA and Shade until Stargirl accidentally breaks the Black Diamond. Free of his imprisonment, Eclipso betrays Burman and sends her to the Shadowlands. Utilizing Gordon's likeness, Eclipso resurfaces to torment the JSA and Stargirl's family via their negative emotions and memories. While Beth Chapel is able to resist, Eclipso sends Stargirl to the Shadowlands. After Shade rescues Stargirl and Burman, the pair join forces with the JSA, Crock, Sportsmaster, Tigress, Starman, Solomon Grundy, Jade, Jakeem Williams, and Thunderbolt to fight Eclipso. The group weakens Eclipso, allowing Thunderbolt to transform him into a slice of toast.
  - Alex Montez also appears in Stargirl, portrayed by Jonathan Blanco. Debuting in the episode "Wildcat", he was the only member of Yolanda's Catholic family not to see her as a disgrace after she was publicly humiliated due to a risqué photo she had sent to her boyfriend Henry King Jr. being leaked to her school.
- Eclipso appears in the Harley Quinn episode "The Big Apricot", voiced by James Adomian.

=== Film ===
- Eclipso makes a cameo appearance in Superman/Batman: Public Enemies.
- The Jean Loring incarnation of Eclipso appears in DC Super Hero Girls: Hero of the Year, voiced by Mona Marshall.
- The Jean Loring incarnation of Eclipso appears in Lego DC Super Hero Girls: Brain Drain, voiced again by Mona Marshall.

=== Video games ===
- Eclipso appears in Justice League: Chronicles.
- Eclipso appears in DC Universe Online, voiced by Jason Liebrecht.
- Eclipso appears as a playable character in DC Unchained.
- Eclipso appears as a playable character in DC Legends.
- Eclipso appears as a character summon in Scribblenauts Unmasked: A DC Comics Adventure.
- The Bruce Gordon incarnation of Eclipso appears in Lego DC Super-Villains, voiced by David Lodge.
- Eclipso makes a cameo appearance in Peacemaker's ending in Mortal Kombat 1.

=== Miscellaneous ===
The Bruce Gordon incarnation of Eclipso appears in Smallville Season 11: Chaos. Amidst an archaeological dig in Africa, Eclipso possesses Gordon, travels to Metropolis, and battles Superman before eventually possessing him and Superboy, leaving Gordon to be taken into custody and the Black Diamond destroyed. S.T.A.R. Labs recover the shards, learning that they are sending signals to each other. Steve Lombard later takes one of the shards, causing him to be possessed by Eclipso until Hank Henshaw and Green Lantern defeat him and take the shards into space.
