= Creeper (DC Comics) =

DC Comics superhero

- Cover of Beware the Creeper (vol. 1) #1 (June 1968), art by Steve Ditko

Publication information
- Publisher: DC Comics
- First appearance: Showcase #73 (April 1968)
- Created by: Steve Ditko; Don Segall

In-story information
- Alter ego: Jack Ryder
- Species: Metahuman
- Team affiliations: Outsiders; Batman Family; Justice League; Shadow Fighters
- Abilities: Transformation; Superhuman strength, stamina, durability, speed, agility, reflexes, leaping, and senses; Accelerated healing; Hypnotic intimidation; Powerful laughter; Expertise in journalism and unarmed combat

The Creeper (Jack Ryder) is a superhero created by Steve Ditko and Don Segall for American comic books published by DC Comics. He is portrayed as a journalist and talk show host, usually living in Gotham City, who gains the ability to transform into the superhuman the Creeper (and vice versa) thanks to experimental science developed by Dr. Yatz. First appearing in Showcase #73 (March 1968), his origin was revised in Secret Origins (vol. 2) #18 in 1987, then partially revised again in The Creeper #1–4 in 1997, then completely reimagined in the six-issue miniseries The Creeper (vol. 2), published in 2006–2007.

Originally, Ryder's transformation into the Creeper involved activating a device that granted superhuman abilities while also covering his face in yellow make-up, concealing his hair in a green wig, and instantly replacing his clothing with a yellow and red costume with green trunks and a fur-like cape; as the Creeper, Ryder then shifted his voice tone and acted chaotically to intimidate foes and protect his identity. Starting in 1987, it was said Ryder suffered an actual slight change in personality when he became the Creeper, as the device not only empowered him and dressed him in a costume but also altered his brain chemistry. Starting in 1997, Ryder and the Creeper are treated as two personalities sharing the same body. The 2006–2007 miniseries The Creeper (vol. 2) presented a new origin. Starting with this story, Ryder's transformation no longer involved a costume and is depicted as a physical transformation. Along with his strange appearance, the Creeper is characterized by superhuman strength, agility, healing and stamina, as well as a maniacal laugh. Starting in the 1990s, this laugh has been able to cause pain or immobility in enemies. Through experience and training, the Creeper is a formidable fighter and acrobat. In the New 52 continuity, a short-lived incarnation of the Creeper was a villain, not a hero, a malicious oni (demon) who inhabited human hosts to create chaos.

The Creeper is a frequent ally of Batman and has been a recurring character in stories involving him. Outside of comics, the Creeper has appeared in the TV shows The New Batman Adventures and Batman: The Brave and the Bold, and appeared in his civilian identity Jack Ryder in the Batman: Arkham video game series. The Creeper shares visual similarities to the villain the Joker, but originally no connection was intended and the two characters did not meet until 1975, seven years after the Creeper's debut. The New Batman Adventures has the Joker's venom involved in the Creeper's origin, with the comics following suit.

== Publication history ==
Showcase #73 (April 1968), the Creeper's first appearance, with art and script by Steve Ditko and dialogue by Don Segall.

The character first appeared in Showcase #73 (April 1968). Later the same year, the Creeper starred in his own series Beware the Creeper, written by Dennis O'Neil (with Steve Ditko plotting the first issue). It lasted six issues. The Creeper repeatedly fought a chameleonic villain called Proteus, whose true identity was revealed just before his violent death in the final issue.

For the next two decades, the Creeper made sporadic appearances in DC Comics stories, often aiding other heroes such as Batman. Most of these stories were written by Denny O'Neil. The Creeper teamed with Batman in The Brave and the Bold #80 (November 1968), then guested in Justice League of America #70 (March 1969). He also appeared with Batman in Detective Comics #418 (December 1971). After the origin was reprinted in Detective Comics #443 (November 1974), Jack Ryder was shown working as a news anchor on Gotham City television in issue #445 (March 1975). In Detective Comics #447–448 (May–June 1975), the Creeper helped Batman prove he had been framed for murder by Ra's al Ghul.

In 1975, he met Batman's archenemy the Joker for the first time in The Joker #3. The story, which featured a character intended to emulate Peanuts creator Charles M. Schulz, began with the Creeper being mistakenly blamed for a crime the Joker committed due to their similar appearances (specifically, green hair and a maniacal laugh). Later that year, the hero appeared in Super-Team Family #2 and was given a new origin that was not referenced again until later.

The Creeper appeared in a one-off solo story in 1st Issue Special #7 (October 1975), penciled by Ditko. He met Wildcat in Super-Team Family #2 (January 1976) and reunited with Batman in The Brave and the Bold #143 (October 1978) and 178 (September 1981). He and other stars of Showcase appeared in that comic's 100th issue (May 1978). A story intended for the never-published Showcase #106 in 1978 (written and drawn by Ditko) was later included in Cancelled Comic Cavalcade #2 and in The Creeper by Steve Ditko hardcover collection published by DC in 2010. The hero also appeared in back-up stories featured in Adventure Comics #445–447 (1976), World's Finest Comics #249–55 (1978–1979, written and fully drawn by Ditko), and The Flash #318–323 (1983). He teamed up with Superman in DC Comics Presents #88 (December 1985), written by Steve Englehart.

Following the company-wide crossover Crisis on Infinite Earths (1985–1986), DC Comics rebooted large portions of its superhero universe, and many characters were given revised origins or reimagined natures to make them more relevant to modern comic book readers. In Secret Origins (vol. 2) #18 (1987), in a story presented by Andrew Helfer and Keith Giffen, the Creeper was given a new origin and it was now said Ryder's behavior while in costume was not simply an act. In this origin, Ryder is drugged against his will when he is then exposed to Dr. Yatz's technology. Whenever he summons his Creeper costume afterward, a side effect is that his mind reverts to the state it was in when he was drugged, thus causing the Creeper's strange behavior.

In Eclipso #13 in 1993, the Creeper is killed by Eclipso. However, he is revealed to have a powerful healing factor that enables him to survive. In the 1997 series The Creeper, written by Len Kaminski, Ryder realizes that before he was ever transformed into the Creeper he possibly had multiple undiagnosed mental illnesses (mentioned are bipolar disorder and an obsessive need for order), apparently inherited from his mother. The series depicted the Creeper as a second personality distinct from his own and occasionally warring for control over their shared body. Ryder also realizes he has repressed the memories of his true origin; the two versions he has recalled before (the original Ditko origin and the Helfer/Giffen origin) were each skewed versions of the truth that his mind found more acceptable. While trying to discover the truth, he fights Proteus again. The series ended in 1998 before the full truth of the Creeper's origin could be fully revealed. The series included a special issue #1,000,000, a tie-in to the 1998 crossover DC One Million.

In 2003, DC's Vertigo Comics imprint released a new miniseries called Beware the Creeper. Taking place outside of mainstream DC canon, this story featured Judith and Madeline Benoir, twin sisters living Paris in the 1920s. The story explores their lives and their connection to the Creeper, a mysterious costumed woman who terrorizes a corrupt family.

Following the DC crossover Infinite Crisis (2005–2006), parts of DC Comics continuity were revised and some characters were given altered histories. Jack Ryder was reintroduced in a follow-up comic DCU: Brave New World (2006), in a short story written by Steve Niles and drawn by Justiniano. The story depicted Ryder as a former journalist who now hosted a talk show named You Are Wrong, where he often attempted to expose corruption and provide commentary on news events. In narration, Ryder reveals that he has been secretly fighting crime as the Creeper for some time and his transformation is presented as a physical alteration of his body and appearance, not just having a costume, wig and make-up appear on him. Ryder also comments that the Creeper is a separate personality sharing his body, a creature who seems wild and sometimes fights for control of their shared body but is also in some ways more altruistic than the talk show host and whose conscience is now influencing Ryder to be a better person. Later the same year, The Creeper (vol. 2) (October 2006 – March 2007), also written by Niles and drawn by Justiniano, featured a flashback story revealing the Creeper's newly revised origin, connecting him to the Joker. The idea that Ryder has a mental illness before ever becoming the Creeper is eliminated; this alter ego's personality is a result of experimental science affecting his body, mixed with the Joker's signature madness-inducing chemical weapons. Batman becomes involved in the story and later gives Ryder a chemical solution that can cure him of the Creeper entirely. Ryder throws away the cure, deciding that he and the Creeper can do more good together.

During the Reign in Hell miniseries (2008–2009), the Creeper was presented as a demon co-inhabiting the body of Jack Ryder, one of several yellow-skinned demons inhabiting Hell. The same story contained internal continuity errors and unexplained contradictions with the accepted DC Comics canon, making its placement questionable at best. Following this story, other comics featuring the Creeper once again depicted him as a human who had been altered by science rather than one possessed by a demon.

In the collected edition of Wednesday Comics (200 pages, DC Comics, June 2010, ISBN 1-4012-2747-3; Titan Books, July 2010, ISBN 1-84856-755-3), the Creeper is featured in the story Beware the Creeper, written by Keith Giffen with art by Eric Canete.

In 2011, DC Comics rebooted its superhero universe again with The New 52. The New 52 continuity gave a new origin for the Creeper in Justice League Dark #23.1. The issue portrayed the Creeper as an oni who "justifies cruel temper tantrums under the guise of spreading chaos" and inhabits numerous human hosts, including Jack Ryder. The 2017 DC Rebirth comic removed many ideas introduced by the New 52 comics and brought back many ideas and stories published before 2011. Jack Ryder and the Creeper appeared again afterward, now once again depicted as a man who becomes a yellow-skinned superhuman due to scientific experimentation rather than demonic possession.

== Fictional character biography ==
=== Pre-Crisis ===
Jack Ryder is a former Gotham City resident and is the host of a political talk show. He is fired after criticizing his own sponsors on-air and refusing to change his behavior or apologize. Knowing Ryder is a decent detective, Chief of Network Security Bill Brane hires the former talk show host as one of his investigators. Brane reveals that CIA contacts have asked him to help find Dr. Yatz, a scientist captured by local gangster Angel Devlin who is working with Communist powers. Ryder decides to infiltrate a masquerade party at Devlin's mansion and visits a local costume shop. The clerk explains he mainly sells costumes for children, but offers Ryder "leftovers" from adult orders. Ryder cobbles together the costume involving yellow tights, green trunks, and red gloves and boots. He completes the disguise with yellow makeup, a green wig, and a red fur-like carpet he decides to use as a cape. At the costume party, Ryder fights some of Devlin's henchmen, suffering injuries in the process, and then discovers the kidnapped Yatz. The scientist injects Ryder with a chemical serum designed to accelerate healing while also granting great strength and stamina. He also hides a tiny device of his own creation in Ryder's wound, saying it is the safest way to keep the technology hidden from Devlin. The device, he explains, can "rearrange the molecular structure of matter", making clothing or items weightless and invisible until needed. By activating the device now hidden beneath his skin, Ryder is able to make his costume vanish or reappear instantly.

As Yatz then destroys the evidence of his work, Devlin's men arrive and shoot him dead. In costume, Ryder escapes Devlin's party, but is blamed for the chaos. Police arrive and one of the cops refers to the yellow-costumed intruder as a "creeper". Deciding he likes the name, Ryder later attacks and defeats Devlin's gang. He then reverts to his civilian guise and informs Brane and the police of Devlin's involvement in Yatz's death. Ryder then decides to continue secretly operating as the Creeper whenever he needs to fight crime. In his private life, he continues acting as a WHAM-TV network security investigator for Brane. A month after first becoming the Creeper, Ryder is assigned to help WHAM-TV weather correspondent Vera Sweet, who has been threatened. The two initially dislike each other, but over time they develop a flirtatious relationship.

Although the Creeper fights crime, he is frequently considered a villain himself by news media and authorities. During his first adventure involving a costumed villain, a man called the Terror, Ryder realizes that Yatz's implanted device has two side effects: when he is the Creeper, it prevents his costume and make-up from being removed from his body, and when he is Ryder his superhuman powers become dormant, leaving him vulnerable.

During his early adventures, the Creeper regularly fights a shape-shifting terrorist named Proteus. At one point, Proteus reveals that he is motivated by being overwhelmed by how corrupt he finds society. He had hoped to find a friend in Jack Ryder and had spared his life before, but then concluded his roommate and friend is actually an enemy after learning he is secretly the Creeper. While attempting another attack on society, Proteus seemingly kills himself and the Creeper muses whether he has lost both an enemy and a friend. Following this, the Creeper continues operating in Gotham City and Ryder becomes a television reporter for WHAM-TV. He winds up teaming up with other superheroes often, most frequently aiding Batman. During an encounter with the Joker, the Creeper is rendered temporarily amnesiac and is tricked into helping the Joker plant a bomb, only realizing the truth at the last moment. He then brings the Joker to justice, not as the Creeper but as Jack Ryder.

=== Post-Crisis revision ===
Following Crisis on Infinite Earths, much of DC Comics history is revised. Jack Ryder is reimagined as a newspaper journalist working for the Herald Examiner and known for exposing corrupt criminal operations. Investigating the home of criminals during a masquerade party, he is ambushed and knocked out. The criminals knew he intended to investigate them and have decided to humiliate him before taking revenge. They drug him with a hallucinogen, one said to cause psychosis if used in too strong a dose, dress him up in a yellow and red costume with a green wig, and present him to the masquerade party as a jester called "the dancing creep". Drugged and confused, Ryder attempts to escape, but is severely beaten. He is then taken some distance away, shot and left for dead.

Ryder awakens in the home of Emil Yatz, a German immigrant and scientist who discovered him near his estate. Yatz explains he used his experimental "inorganic matter transference" technology to heal and revive Ryder. Yatz explains he was rejected by the scientific community and became a science fiction writer before finding a sponsor. He created a device that can map the atomic structure of inorganic objects and then "swap" them with others, rending one temporarily invisible and intangible. Yatz realized his criminal sponsors intended to kill him soon and, when he found Ryder, he decided to hide his device inside the man's body. Attaching the power source activated the device now in Ryder's forearm under his skin, healing the man. After destroying his scientific notes, Yatz explained that the device's "sub-atomic matrix" has been imprinted with Ryder's costume since he was wearing it when the scientist attached the power source. Now realizing Ryder also had a drug in his system, Yatz warns the drug may have been imprinted as well, meaning Ryder will once again be in a drug-induced state if he activates the device. The criminals arrive and murder Yatz before the scientist can say more. Touching his forearm, Ryder activates the Yatz device and becomes the costumed, chaotic Creeper, bringing the criminals to justice with physically enhanced abilities and healing. He later wakes up at his typewriter, having no real memory of his activities as the Creeper, but knowing his alter ego will be an effective weapon against crime.

=== Death and rebirth ===
The Creeper appeared in the Eclipso: The Darkness Within crossover event that happened in various DC Comics annuals in 1992. Tricked into being mentally controlled by the dark diamonds of Eclipso, the Creeper is later freed by Bruce Gordon, the villain's longtime adversary. In the self-titled Eclipso comic book series, the Creeper, Gordon and Gordon's wife Mona make a foray into a South American territory Eclipso has conquered. Later, the Creeper joins government operative Amanda Waller and several heroes to fight against Eclipso. Called the Shadow Fighters, the group included Major Victory, Steel, and Wildcat. In Eclipso #13, the Shadow Fighters venture into Eclipso's territory and engage the villain in battle. Eclipso uses his power to possess several hyenas, who track down and dismember the Creeper, apparently killing him.

The 1997 solo series The Creeper reveals that the Creeper's healing ability increased to compensate for the damage inflicted by Eclipso, allowing him to heal and resurrect. He also now exhibits a weaponized laugh that can cause pain and even stun opponents. The experience of death and resurrection is traumatic for Jack Ryder, who becomes a patient to the psychiatrist Dr. Solos. While undergoing therapy, Ryder considers the possibility that he has inherited his mother's mental illness and may have only mistakenly believed the Creeper's personality is a result of drugs and a scientific device. He later realizes that he has conflicting memories of the Creeper's origin. In one version, he remembers buying costume leftovers before infiltrating a masquerade party. In another version, he remembers being drugged and shot before Dr. Yatz resurrected him. He realizes the different versions of this origin include elements that do not make much sense to him and concludes that none of these memories are accurate, that he has repressed the memory of his origin and his mind created other scenarios he found more acceptable. Ryder discovers Solos is actually his old enemy Proteus in disguise.

=== Post-Infinite Crisis ===
Following the Infinite Crisis event, several areas of DC Comics continuity are revised. Jack Ryder is a former journalist who now works as the host of a controversial political and news commentary TV show You Are Wrong!, where he regularly challenges criminals and politicians and often praises costumed vigilantes. When he realizes others are becoming suspicious of his connection to the notorious Creeper, Ryder pretends to be disillusioned by the Creeper and promises $1 million to whoever can catch him.

The Creeper's revised origin story is revealed in a flashback in the miniseries The Creeper (vol. 2). Years earlier, Ryder is interested in the work of scientist Vincent Yatz, who is combining stem cell therapy and microscopic nanotechnology to create a revolutionary "nanocell" treatment called "smart-skin". This technology enhances a human body's regeneration, not only healing wounds, but even preventing scarring and restoring burns. Local mobsters come to Yatz's lab to steal this new technology and Ryder accidentally interrupts when he arrives. Unable to escape, but determined to keep the mobsters from taking his discovery, Yatz quickly injects the last sample of smart-skin, still somewhat unstable, into an unwilling Ryder. Believing that Yatz will create more nanocells if forced to, the criminals shoot Ryder in the head and throw him into the ocean. The smart-skin activates and revives Ryder, transforming him into a yellow-skinned superhuman with green hair and a mane of thick, red hair growing on his back and shoulders. The Creeper possesses Ryder's knowledge, but acts as a separate personality and can communicate with Ryder in his normal form.

Batman encounters the Creeper while on patrol and then investigates the Dr. Yatz case, discovering in the process that the Creeper is Jack Ryder. Ryder and the Creeper learn that Yatz secretly intended the smart-skin to be a weapon and that tests on human subjects repeatedly resulted in mutated monsters. To achieve better results, Yatz took on a silent partner who introduced his own chemical "nerve agent" to the smart-skin, which resulted in Ryder's transformation into the Creeper. The silent partner is revealed to be the Joker and the "nerve" agent used was a version of his Joker venom, which alters skin and hair color and causes temporary madness and uncontrollable laughter.

=== Reign in Hell ===
During the Reign in Hell miniseries, the Creeper is depicted as a demon who inhabited the body of Jack Ryder rather than an identity he assumed due to scientific experimentation. The demon later leaves Ryder's body and returns to Hell, having been recalled by Lilith.

=== The New 52 ===
In The New 52 continuity reboot, the Creeper is first seen in a brief cameo when he is considered as a candidate for a new United Nations-sanctioned Justice League International team. In Phantom Stranger #7, Jack Ryder is introduced as a talk show host working at Morgan Edge's network who recently quit his job. After encountering the Phantom Stranger, Ryder is killed by a monster attacking Metropolis. The Presence, in the form of a dog, notes that Ryder's story is not over and that he was not led to his death, but rather to his destiny.

In Katana, the Creeper is revealed to be an oni who possesses human hosts to cause chaos and violence and was previously sealed inside Soultaker, the mystical sword wielded by Katana. When Killer Croc breaks the sword, all the souls are released, including the Creeper. Seeking out a new body to "ride", the Creeper discovers the recently deceased Jack Ryder and decides to possess him.

The relationship between Jack Ryder and the oni is further explored in Justice League Dark #23.1, part of the Forever Evil crossover. The story reveals the Creeper's past in feudal Japan and describes him as a wild being who "justifies cruel temper tantrums under the guise of spreading chaos". Jack Ryder is resurrected after the oni possesses him and is unaware that he now shares his body with the oni, who occasionally takes over his form and uses him to cause chaos and death.

The 2017 initiative DC Rebirth altered DC Comics' continuity, removing much of changes made by The New 52 and restoring several stories and ideas from comics published before 2011. The Creeper is reintroduced with his more classic appearance, once again the product of experimental science rather than a demon inhabiting a human host.

== Powers, abilities, and equipment ==
=== Pre-Crisis on Infinite Earths ===
The Creeper's powers are physical in nature as a result of Dr. Yatz's discoveries. Jack Ryder transforms himself into the Creeper by holding and pressing the button of a small "activator" device, which he often keeps inside his pocket. This activates another device hidden underneath his skin that would rearrange molecules, immediately replacing Ryder's clothing with the Creeper's costume, yellow make-up, green wig, and red, fur-like cape. This also activates a chemical Yatz had injected inside Ryder, thus granting him enhanced strength, stamina, durability, speed, agility, reflexes, healing, and senses. When he deactivated his costume, as well as forcing it to disappear, these abilities became dormant. In his Creeper form, he is capable of scaling buildings or climbing walls via acrobatics.

=== Post-Crisis on Infinite Earths ===
This version of the Creeper has the same capabilities as before, but he owes them all to one device implanted in him rather than a chemical agent and two devices. When Jack Ryder first became the Creeper, he is under the influence of drugs. As a result, each time he transforms again, this device not only restores Ryder's powers, but it alters his brain chemistry to mimic a distinct personality. After he changes back into his human form, Ryder also has trouble remembering the Creeper's actions. Due to being killed by dismemberment via Eclipsed hyenas, the Creeper eventually resurrects himself from death. During that revelation, he can stun or inflict pain upon others with his laughs, as well as frighten them. Ryder is also able to recall some memories of his alter ego.

=== Post-Infinite Crisis ===
In this version of history, Jack Ryder had been injected with "nano-cells", an experiment intended to create aggressive supersoldiers. This "smart-skin" was created from a combination of stem cell research, nanotechnology, and various Joker Venom chemicals. As a result, Ryder physically transforms into a yellow-skinned, green-haired, and red-maned metahuman with his own distinct personality. These nano-cells can rearrange the molecules of his clothing to become the Creeper's costume and vice versa. The Creeper has immense strength, stamina, durability, speed, agility, reflexes, and healing, as well as hyper-keen senses, pain-inducing laughs, and fearful presence. Both alter egos are able to mentally communicate with each other.

== Other versions ==
=== Beware the Creeper ===
A female alternate universe Creeper from 1920s Paris appears in Vertigo Comics' Beware the Creeper.

=== Batman: The Dark Knight Strikes Again ===
The Creeper makes a cameo appearance in Batman: The Dark Knight Strikes Again, in which he is killed by "Joker Boy" as part of a revenge scheme against Batman.

=== Kingdom Come ===
An elderly Creeper appears in Kingdom Come as a member of Batman's Outsiders.

=== JLA: The Nail ===
The Creeper makes a cameo appearance in JLA: The Nail #2 as a prisoner of Cadmus Labs.

=== DC One Million ===
In a possible future in the 853rd century depicted in DC One Million, an entity from the planet IAI called RYDR senses a disturbance that threatens to unravel reality and transforms into the Creeper to avert it. His investigation leads him to Jack Ryder, who has grown tired of being a superhero and separated from the Creeper. However, the latter produces bizarre, dangerous alternate versions of himself, each embodying aspects of his personality. Eventually, the future Creeper gathers the alternates, returns them to the original, and convinces him and Ryder to reunite.

=== Tangent Comics ===
A variant of the Creeper from Earth-9 appears in Tangent Comics. This version is a powerful warlock and member of an occult organization known as the Black Circle.

=== Amalgam Comics ===
Kurt "Jack" Ryder / Nightcreeper, a character inspired by the Creeper and Marvel Comics character Nightcrawler, appears in the Amalgam Comics story JLX as a member of the eponymous JLX (Justice League X-Men).

=== Flashpoint ===
A variant of Jack Ryder from the Flashpoint timeline appears in the tie-in Flashpoint: Wonder Woman and the Furies #2 as a news broadcaster who assists Wonder Woman in conquering the United Kingdom.

=== Batman Beyond ===
In a possible future depicted in Batman Beyond (vol. 6), Jack Ryder retired as the Creeper to focus on his career as a News 52 anchorman and co-sponsor for a criminal rehabilitation program. Additionally, Ryder resents Bruce Wayne after his co-anchor Adalyn Stern becomes the new Scarecrow due to a traumatic childhood experience she had with Batman.

=== Shag ===
In the most obscure iteration of the Creeper, Steve Ditko took the un-inked pencils for stories originally meant for World's Finest but never published and modified them to make his own creator-owned version. Retaining the transformation-inducing device implanted beneath the skin and the television station location, Jack Ryder became Jay Oaker and the laughing, hyper-colorful Creeper became the grim, all green and decidedly less shaggy Shag. Shag's adventures were featured in Ditko's World and other independently published books.

== In other media ==
=== Television ===
- Jack Ryder / The Creeper appears in series set in the DC Animated Universe (DCAU), voiced by Jeff Bennett.
  - Ryder first appears in The New Batman Adventures, serving as a recurring character and reporter throughout the series until he becomes the Creeper in the episode "Beware the Creeper" after being exposed to the Joker's laughing gas and submerged in an Ace Chemicals chemical vat. He then goes on a violent crusade against the Joker despite being sidetracked by his infatuation with Harley Quinn and stream-of-consciousness rambling. Eventually, after being begged by the Joker to stop him, Batman develops a skin patch to suppress Ryder's Creeper form and revert him to normal. However, Ryder removes the patch, doubting its effectiveness.
  - The Creeper makes non-speaking cameo appearances in Justice League Unlimited as a member of an expanded Justice League.
- The Creeper appears in the teaser for the Batman: The Brave and the Bold episode "Time Out for Vengeance!", voiced by Brian Bloom.
- Jack Ryder appears in the Batman: Caped Crusader episode "The Night of the Hunters", voiced by Corey Burton.

=== Film ===
- An alternate universe variant of Jack Ryder appears in Superman: Red Son, voiced by William Salyers.
- The Creeper appears in Justice League: Crisis on Infinite Earths.

=== Video games ===
- Jack Ryder appears in DC Universe Online, voiced by Leif Anders.
- Jack Ryder appears in Batman: The Telltale Series, voiced by Robert Clotworthy.
- Jack Ryder appears in Batman: The Enemy Within, voiced again by Robert Clotworthy.
- The Creeper appears as a playable character in Lego DC Super-Villains, voiced by J. P. Karliak.
- The Creeper appears as a playable character in Freedom Force vs the 3rd Reich.

==== Batman: Arkham ====
Jack Ryder appears as a supporting character in the Batman: Arkham franchise, voiced by James Horan.

- Ryder appears in Batman: Arkham Asylum via a radio broadcast.
- Ryder makes his first physical appearance in Batman: Arkham City. At the beginning of the game, Ryder is arrested by Hugo Strange's TYGER guards and thrown in the titular prison. In the side-mission "Shot in the Dark", Batman saves Ryder from being assassinated by Deadshot, who was hired by Strange to eliminate the latter's enemies.
- Ryder appears in the end credits of Batman: Arkham Origins via another radio broadcast.
- Ryder appears in Batman: Arkham Knight. He stays behind in the GCPD's headquarters after the city is evacuated due to Scarecrow's threats to report on the crisis. In the side-mission "Lamb to the Slaughter", Ryder is kidnapped by Deacon Blackfire and his cult, who attempt to sacrifice him. Batman stops them and rescues Ryder, who returns to the GCPD.
- Ryder appears in Suicide Squad: Kill the Justice League as the host of The Batman Experience, a museum exhibition that retells the events of the previous Arkham games.
- Ryder appears in Batman: Arkham Shadow via radio broacasts.

=== Miscellaneous ===
- The Creeper appears in the Justice League Unlimited tie-in comic book.
- Jack Ryder appears in Batman: The Audio Adventures, voiced by Seth Meyers.

=== Merchandise ===
- In the late 1990s, Kenner released an action figure of The New Batman Adventures incarnation of the Creeper.
- In January 2011, Mattel released an action figure of the comic book incarnation of the Creeper in the DC Universe Classics line.
- In November 2011, Mattel released an action figure of the Justice League Unlimited incarnation of the Creeper in the DC Universe: Justice League Unlimited Fan Collection line.
