= Gary Cohn (comics) =

American comic book writer

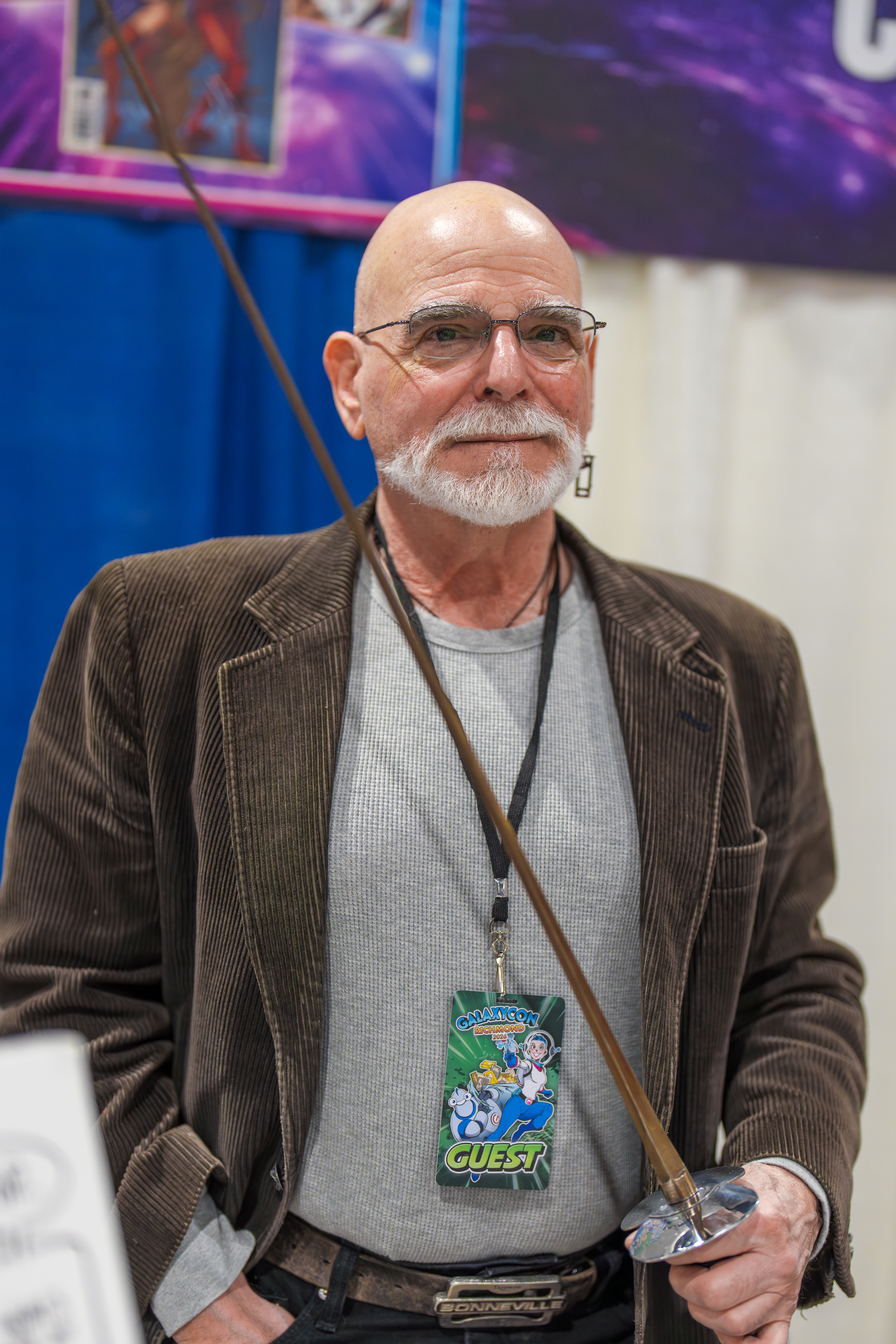
- Cohn at GalaxyCon Richmond in 2026
- Born: January 25, 1952 (age 74)
- Areas: Writer, teacher
- Notable works: Amethyst, Princess of Gemworld; Blue Devil

Gary Cohn (born January 25, 1952) is an American comic book writer, and co-creator (with Dan Mishkin) of the DC Comics characters Amethyst, Princess of Gemworld and Blue Devil.

== Early life ==
Gary Cohn attended Michigan State University earning his bachelor's degree in creative writing (liberal arts) and graduated from Bowling Green State University with an M.A. in 1980.

== Career ==
Cohn and longtime friend Dan Mishkin entered the comics industry together following a correspondence with Jack C. Harris, an editor at DC Comics. Their first work for the company was the three-page short story "On the Day of His Return" published in Time Warp #3 (Feb.–March 1980) and drawn by Steve Ditko. In 1983, Cohn and Mishkin created Amethyst, Princess of Gemworld with artist Ernie Colón. The following year, the writing team and Paris Cullins introduced Blue Devil. DC gave both series a promotional push by featuring them in free, 16-page insert previews. Cohn and artist Ron Randall co-created the "Barren Earth" feature as a backup in The Warlord #63 (Nov. 1982) and it was spun off into a four–issue limited series in 1985. In the mid-1990s, Cohn wrote several stories for William Tucci's Crusade Comics including an intercompany crossover between Crusade's Shi and Marvel Comics' Daredevil. Cohn has written three Hardy Boys and two Nancy Drew novels.

Cohn was on the faculty of the Information Technology High School in Long Island City as a U.S. History and Government teacher. He retired in 2014.

== Bibliography ==
=== Archie Comics ===
- Black Hood #2 (1983)

=== Crusade Comics ===
- Demon Gun #2 (1996)
- Shi / Cyblade #1 (1995)
- Shi / Daredevil: Honor Thy Mother #1 (1997)
- Shi: Senryaku #1 (1995)
- Tomoe #0 (1996)
- Tomoe-Witchblade: Fire Sermon #1 (1996)

=== DC Comics ===
- Amethyst, Princess of Gemworld #1–12, Annual #1 (1983–1984)
- Amethyst vol. 2 #1–11 (1985)
- Aquaman Special #1 (1988)
- The Best of DC #35, 52, 61, 71 (1983–1986)
- Blue Devil #1–10, 12–28, 30–31, Annual #1 (1984–1986)
- The Brave and the Bold #186, 191 (1982)
- Conqueror of the Barren Earth #1–4 (1985)
- DC Comics Presents #48, 50, 57, 63, 76, 96 (1982–1986)
- DC Sampler #1 (1983)
- Demolition Man #2 (1993)
- The Flash #306 (1982)
- The Fury of Firestorm #24 (Blue Devil preview) (1984)
- Ghosts #109, 111 (1982)
- Green Lantern vol. 2 #152–153, 170 (1982–1983)
- House of Mystery #295–296, 299–303, 310–319, 321 (1981–1983)
- Jonah Hex #53–60, 73–75 (1981–1983)
- Legion of Super-Heroes vol. 2 #298 (Amethyst preview) (1983)
- Mystery in Space #114, 116 (1980–1981)
- The New Adventures of Superboy #31 (1982)
- Omega Men #30 (1985)
- Secret Origins vol. 2 #24, 41 (1988–1989)
- Secrets of Haunted House #42, 44 (1981–1982)
- Showcase '93 #1–6 (Blue Devil) (1993)
- Star Trek #51 (1993)
- Teen Titans Spotlight #18 (1988)
- Time Warp #3 (1980)
- The Unexpected #214, 216–217, 219–220 (1981–1982)
- The Warlord #42–47 (OMAC backup stories) #63–65, 67–70, 72–74, 76–88 (Conqueror of the Barren Earth backup stories) (1981–1984)
- Weird War Tales #95, 101–102, 107, 122–123 (1981–1983)
- Who's Who: The Definitive Directory of the DC Universe #2–3, 16 (1985–1986)
- World's Finest Comics #301 (1984)

==== Collected editions ====
- Showcase Presents: Amethyst, Princess of Gemworld (collects Legion of Super-Heroes #298, the original Amethyst, Princess of Gemworld 12–issue limited series, Amethyst Annual #1, DC Comics Presents #63, and Amethyst #1–11 ongoing series, 648 pages, September 2012, ISBN 1401236774)

=== Marvel Comics ===
- Midnight Sons Unlimited #2 (1993)

=== Mattel ===
- Masters of the Universe: He-Man Meets Ram-Man! #1 (1983)
- Masters of the Universe: The Terror of Tri-Klops! #1 (1983)

=== Renegade Press ===
- Revolver #5 (1986)
