= Nemesis (DC Comics) =

Nemesis is the name of two fictional characters in the DC Comics universe. Thomas Andrew Tresser first appeared in The Brave and the Bold #166 (September 1980) and was created by Cary Burkett and Dan Spiegle. Soseh Mykros first appeared in JSA Annual #1 (October 2000) and was created by David S. Goyer and Uriel Caton.

== Creation ==
Editor Paul Levitz instructed Burkett to created a new character for the Brave and the Bold anthology series as a back up Burkett recalled the process

"His instructions were for me to create a character who was a 'non- costumed' hero, one who would fit well into a Batman-themed book … with some general similarities, but strong differences"

Burkett explained the genesis of the design of the character

"Paul had Dan Spiegle in mind as the artist before the character was created, I think. I figured that costume-wise, Nemesis would operate in basic black, but Paul added the touch that he would have a patch of the Scales of Justice on his costume. It was the right touch, I think—the symbol was important to the character."

As for the story aspect Burkett spoke on the inspiration for the storyline of the character

"The story I based his back-ground on was that of Edwin Booth, famous American actor in the 1860s and brother of the assassin John Wilkes Booth. After John Wilkes Booth killed President Abraham Lincoln, Edwin Booth's reputation was destroyed as well for many years. He carried around the disgrace of the Booth name for years after the assassination. I crafted the origin of Nemesis around a similar situation."

== Publication history ==
The Thomas Tresser character was created by writer Cary Burkett in 1979 and named for an actor with whom Burkett was rooming in New Hampshire. The character debuted in an eight-page backup story in The Brave and the Bold #166 (September 1980) written by Burkett and drawn by Dan Spiegle.

The character was featured in one of the Final Crisis Aftermath limited series Escape, written by Ivan Brandon with art by Marco Rudy. In 2010, he was the eponymous character in the mini-series Nemesis: The Impostors.

== Fictional character biography ==
=== Thomas Andrew Tresser ===
Nemesis
- Agent Tresser in Wonder Woman.

Publication information
- Publisher: DC Comics
- First appearance: The Brave and the Bold #166 (September 1980)
- Created by: Cary Burkett; Dan Spiegle

In-story information
- Alter ego: Thomas Andrew Tresser
- Team affiliations: Shadow Fighters; Suicide Squad; Onslaught; Global Peace Agency; Justice League
- Notable aliases: Many, among others Sarge Steel
- Abilities: Master of disguise; uses disposable masks made of a fine, highly malleable material which could be instantly dissolved with a special spray in his collar

Thomas Andrew Tresser is a vigilante turned operative for the U.S. government and a master of disguise. His default costume is a black turtleneck sweater with a balance as a chest symbol and a chest holster.

He was an applicant to an unnamed government agency whose brother Craig was an undercover agent infiltrating a criminal syndicate called "the Council". Craig was brainwashed into killing their family friend Ben Marshall and was subsequently killed in self-defense by fellow agents. Tom thus became "Nemesis", preferring to use an alias instead of his dishonored family name. With the assistance of the Batman, he cleared his brother's name and saw the men responsible for his brother's death dead.

This was covered in a backup series in The Brave and the Bold #166 through 192, with team-ups with the Batman in #170 and #193.

Nemesis was apparently killed in the helicopter crash that killed the council's leader, though he was later revealed to have survived, thanks to Amanda Waller and Rick Flag. He then became one of the few non-criminal members of the Suicide Squad as a means of paying off what he perceived as a debt. Nemesis became an occasional member of the Suicide Squad, assisting them from time to time, and fell in love with one of their members, Nightshade.

During a mission in Moscow with the Suicide Squad, the team tried to rescue Zoya Trigorin. The mission was a failure, as she died in his arms, and he was taken into custody. Rick Flag and Nightshade set up a rescue mission for their teammate, and came into conflict with the Justice League because of it. Eventually, the two teams worked out their differences, and Nemesis was allowed to escape by the Justice League. He continued to work alongside the Squad, but left the team after conflicts with Amanda Waller. He later returned only shortly to help retrieve Flag's kidnapped son and to assist in trying to uncover a secret government cabal. This plot-point was never resolved.

Tresser was drafted into the Shadow Fighters to battle the villain Eclipso. He was originally the sole survivor of the Eclipso massacre that claimed the lives of the rest of the Shadow Fighters. He continued the fight against Eclipso in a smaller recon-team that also included Nightshade and the matter-manipulator Chunk. Nemesis and Chunk were saved from a nuclear bomb attack by Nightshade's powers.

Nemesis threatens Amanda Waller.

After his involvement with the Suicide Squad and the Shadow Fighters ended, he apparently met his end - again - in the pages of Catwoman. In Superman Secret Files 2004, Nemesis was revealed to be alive and well, impersonating Sarge Steel and apparently working for a shadowy Cabal. Furthermore, in the last issue of the second volume of Suicide Squad the then-current team's erstwhile leader Sgt. Rock is revealed to have been an impostor. Given the events of the Superman Secret Files, "Rock" may well have been Nemesis for some or all of his appearances with the Squad. The story of what happened to Nemesis between his 'death' in Catwoman and subsequent reappearance in Superman Secret Files has not yet been told.

One Year Later after the events of Infinite Crisis, Nemesis is seen aiding government agent Diana Prince, Wonder Woman in disguise, in the rescue of Donna Troy from several of the Amazon's villains. Nemesis is part of the newly re-opened Department of Metahuman Affairs under Sarge Steel.

Around this time, Nemesis assists in saving the life of the second Maxi-Man. Shortly before the events of the Amazons Attack limited series, Nemesis questions the detainment of Wonder Woman by the D.M.A. and defies orders to rescue her. He uncovers a plot by the villain Circe to trick the U.S. government into destroying Themyscira under false pretenses. During the Amazon counterattack, he is stung by several gigantic Stygian Killer Hornets, native to the Amazon Nation. Wonder Woman risks her life by traveling to Themyscira for an antidote and revives Nemesis back into health.

Shortly thereafter, Nemesis is again wounded in battle. While he is recovering in the hospital, Wonder Woman begins courting Tresser, in the traditional Amazon manner. After formally meeting her mother Hippolyta, he is inducted as an Amazon despite being a male. He is given the title of Sir Thomas of Cleveland and given the ranking of Guardsman. Tom ends any potential relationship aside of friendship with Diana once he discovers that she does not truly love him but instead wanted to use him to create a family.

In the Final Crisis Aftermath: Escape storyline, Tresser is kidnapped and "reprogrammed" by the Global Peace Agency. He then appears in Nemesis: The Imposters, battling false versions of the DC Universe.

During the Heroes in Crisis storyline, Nemesis checked into Sanctuary to deal with the stress of his vigilante work. It is unknown if Nemesis was killed in the unexpected attack or not.

=== Soseh Mykros ===
Nemesis
- Nemesis on the restless cover of JSA Annual #1 (October 2000). Art by Buzz.

Publication information
- Publisher: DC Comics
- First appearance: JSA Annual #1 (October 2000)
- Created by: David S. Goyer; Uriel Caton

In-story information
- Alter ego: Soseh Mykros
- Team affiliations: Justice Society of America; The Council
- Abilities: Superhuman strength, speed, and agility Highly skilled sword fighter

A second Nemesis debuted in JSA Annual #1 (October 2000), which had no connection with the original and was a completely different character. Soseh Mykros was the genetically engineered daughter of the leader of the council (not to be confused with the above-mentioned Council), a terrorist group that had once used the hero Paul Kirk, Manhunter. She originally operated as an ally of the Justice Society and assisted the team during a few adventures. She soon departed for other causes to her interest. Eventually, she found herself teaming up with Black Adam's group of loose cannon heroes, a group that—while altruistic—had no compunctions about killing or blurring the lines of legitimacy with their respective goals. She soon became romantically involved with her teammate Alexander Montez, a man who had managed to bind the demon Eclipso to himself, and for a time they were happy with one another. Of course, as with many such tragic romances, this was not meant to last for long. At some point in the series, Alex finally lost control of his body, allowing Eclipso to kill Soseh when her guard was down. Alex regained control, but it was too late. He committed suicide in remorse.

=== DC Rebirth: Pennyworth clone ===
Nemesis

Publication information
- Publisher: DC Comics
- First appearance: All-Star Batman #11 (August 2017)
- Created by: Scott Snyder; Rafael Albuquerque

In-story information
- Notable aliases: Dark Knight
- Abilities: Highly skilled fighter

During Alfred Pennyworth's time in the military, he was mentored by a man named Briar, who enrolled him in a program to become the Nemesis, a Batman-like figure. Frustrated with many failed pupils and Pennyworth's unwillingness to kill, Briar would create a perfect young clone as the new Nemesis. Having reduced aging, he would survive to encounter Batman and Alfred in Miami. Eventually, Nemesis killed his master, and was allowed by Alfred and Batman to retreat into the wilderness.

== Relationship of Tresser and Mykros ==
In DC Comics continuity, Mykros does not seem to have any connection to Tresser except for the fact that they both battled organizations named "the Council" and as a result Tresser was killed for Mykros to debut in JSA. When asked in an interview what happened to Nemesis (Tom Tresser), why he was killed in Catwoman #62, and was it true that his death was editorially mandated, Catwoman writer Devin Grayson explained:

I was actually hoping to use Nemesis for the role in which I ended up using Trickster – cheerful foil and potential romance. But yes, I was told that he was scheduled to be eighty-sixed – an editor liked his name, but didn't like the character, and had plans, I guess, for a 'new' Nemesis. He wasn't slated to die in Catwoman, but I figured that if he was on his way out, his death might as well be handled by someone who liked and respected him – I tried really hard to show what a great character he was before I killed him in such a way as to ensure that should anyone change their mind, they could bring him back without too much trouble.

== In other media ==
Nemesis as he appears in Justice League Unlimited.

The Thomas Tresser incarnation of Nemesis makes non-speaking appearances in Justice League Unlimited as a member of the Justice League.
