= Titans: Beast World =

American comic book crossover

- Publisher: DC Comics
- Publication date: November 2023 – January 2024
- Genre: Superhero
Title(s)
Titans World #1-6, Titans Beast World Tour, Action Comics #1060, Titans #5-8, Nightwing #110-112
- Main character(s): Teen Titans; Nightwing; Beast Boy

Creative team
- Writer: Tom Taylor
- Artist(s): Ivan Reis, Danny Miki
- Letterer: Wes Abbott
- Colorist: Brad Anderson
- Editor: Ben Abernathy

"Titans: Beast World" is an eight-issue comic book crossover storyline published by DC Comics from November 2023 to January 2024, featuring Titans dealing with the people of Earth turning into animals after being exposed to Beast Boy's spores. This is the first major crossover event where the Teen Titans are in the main spotlight, and it is written by Tom Taylor and drawn by Ivan Reis as part of the Dawn of DC initiative. The event received critical acclaim from critics who praised Tom Taylor's writing, the characters, the art, and the tie-ins.

== Publication history ==
On July 22, 2023, DC Comics announced that Tom Taylor will write a crossover event where Titans will have to deal with an alien similar to Starro, and face the consequences where people on Earth will mutate into animals.

== Plot summary ==
=== Main plot ===
Brother Eternity of the Church of Eternity sends two astronauts, dubbed the "Forevernauts", to Titan where they encounter a strange temple. Brother Eternity speaks ancient Tamaranean that only Starfire understands which causes the temple to send out forces that attack the Forevernauts. The Titans (Cyborg, Raven, Donna Troy, and Starfire) go to the moon where they see the Forevernauts being killed by mysterious forces. Starfire gathers the worlds' heroes and reveals that Titan is a prison for a parasitic alien entity known as the "Necrostar"; Starfire explains to the heroes that the Necrostar eradicated half of a planet the last time it was free, only being driven back by the intervention of Starro. Beast Boy offers a plan to stop the attack, and has the other heroes stall the Necrostar while Beast Boy transforms himself into a Star conqueror, nicknaming the form "Garro". The Necrostar infects Shazam and other human beings, but Beast Boy sends out starfish spores of his own to free them. Cyborg creates a boom tube to help Beast Boy send the Necrostar to a distant nebula, costing the latter's conqueror form an arm, but the two are confronted by Doctor Hate (a being created by Amanda Waller back in "Knight Terrors") who knocks Cyborg unconscious and seemingly erases Beast Boy's memories from Garro. Garro's spores spread across the world, infecting people and transforming them into feral humanoid animals, including Black Adam.

Beast Boy's spores start attacking the heroes while Animal Man is overwhelmed by the sudden influx of new animal life connected to the Red. Batman is infected with Beast Boy's spores and starts turning into a wolf. Nightwing manages to defeat the mutated Batman by knocking him over a river and tells Barbara Gordon that he needs a cage. Donna Troy and Starfire attempt to subdue Black Adam in his black lion form, while Barbara Gordon realizes that Beast Boy's spores instinctively infect the strongest beings they can find. Waller and Peacemaker meets with the President of the United States and ask him to activate the emergency Bureau of Sovereignty to contain the threat.

Donna Troy and Starfire try to deal with the mutated Black Adam while Wally West and Bart Allen try to get rid of the spores in Kahndaq. Adam bites Starfire and escapes while Raven tells Donna Troy to use her Lasso of Persuasion on Garro in an effort to restore Beast Boy's mind. Nightwing takes the mutated Batman to Titans Tower for containment and is inspected by his neighbor Dr. Clancy when Detective Chimp arrived to explain that the spores seem to be targeting infrastructure. Power Girl is infected while rescuing a falling plane, transforming into a phoenix, but Jon Kent arrives to take her down. Peacemaker and Waller go to Stryker's Island to find Lex Luthor and retrieve a long-range teleporter that he stole from Batman.

Peacemaker knocks out and abducts Chester Runk, taking him to Waller. Giganta is infected while rescuing civilians and turns into a gigantic grizzly bear; Swamp Thing, Jon Kent, Nightwing, Cyborg, Wally, and Starfire successfully contain her while rescuing civilians. Sarge Steel announces on television that the military will begin efforts to kill Garro to end the threat, causing Nightwing to ask Raven and Donna Troy to protect Beast Boy. Doctor Hate arrives and stalls Raven long enough for Waller to use Luthor's teleporter to transport Runk into the middle of Garro's body, activating Runk's abilities and seemingly killing them both.

The President of the United States reports that Garro has been killed and publicly congratulates Waller. Waller praises Runk for his sacrifice, but notes that Garro's spores are still active. Waller announces that the Bureau of Sovereignty will round up all the mutated humans and kill them to end the threat. The Titans overhear this and Raven wants to kill Waller, but Donna Troy manages to calm her down. Cyborg wants to hack into the military systems to prevent Waller's problem, but Nightwing persuades him to only do so as a last resort. Raven transports Wally and Nightwing to meet Waller and Peacemaker where Nightwing quickly defeats Peacemaker. Nightwing tries to persuade Waller to call off her attack, but she refuses to, forcing him to deactivate her machines. Waller mocks the Titans and insults Beast Boy which causes Raven to nearly kill Waller, but Doctor Hate stops Raven and it is revealed Hate is Raven's demonic self.

Doctor Hate explains that she is one of the missing pieces of Raven's soul (Note: As revealed in Nightwing #104.) manifested into a living being and Raven teleports Nightwing to help the innocents. Nightwing tells Barbara Gordon that Hate is Raven's demonic side released from the soul gem weeks ago and asks Jon Kent to free everyone by killing the Beast Boy Spores. Jon frees Batman from the Beast Boy Spores and Nightwing convinces the President to trust them again. During the fight, Hate realizes that the mutated animals contain Beast Boy's consciousness and Raven realizes everyone is indirectly killing Beast Boy. The remaining heroes free everyone from Beast Boy's Spores, and Starfire comes to Raven's aid while Wally West destroys Hate's helmet. Raven tells Starfire to gather all of Beast Boy's Spores and heads off to fight Hate. In the aftermath, Waller takes control of the Hall of Justice by framing the Titans for Beast Boy's invasion. Beast Boy reforms, but loses most of his consciousness. Raven seemingly appears, and the heroes manages to make Beast Boy regain his memories by fusing his old self with his current body. However, it is revealed that only Hate returned and has trapped Raven in her soul gem.

=== Tie-Ins ===
==== Titans: Beast World - Waller Rising ====
Amanda Waller enlists Deadeye, her nephew, to find Doctor Hate, who stole something from her. Val-Zod and Red Tornado of Earth 2 (who is an alternate version of Lois Lane) are defeated by Hate. Black Manta and Gallous the Goat meet up with Hate for a deal, but Hate reneges on the deal and defeats them. Deadeye learns that he needs to sever Hate's magical connection by stealing an Orichalcum ore to set off an explosion that will weaken him. Hate starts attacking Nubia, Doctor Mist, and Freedom Beast to gain more power due to Beast Boy's spores causing more chaos around the globe. Batwing (David Zambiwe) and Vixen go to the Red Sea to convince Black Manta to join them. Val-Zod meets Gallous while Deadeye is defeated by Hate and meets Val-Zod, Gallous, Nubia, and Freedom Beast. With the help of Vixen, Deadeye manages to weaken Hate's hold on his forces and take down Hate. Hate tries to mutate Black Manta and Vixen tells Deadeye to tap in the energy of the Kingdom (the place Hate draws his power from) to lock out Hate forever. Val-Zod manages to free Black Manta while Waller steals Hate from them and tells Hate to follow her orders or there will be consequences.

==== Titans: Beast World Tour – Metropolis ====
Nia Nal tells her friend about how her powers evolved over the past few months, allowing her to access her precognition while she is awake. She has visions of A-Town (her city) being blown up. Nia meets up with Jon Kent to tell everyone to evacuate but they are encountered by Livewire, who was mutated into an electric eel-like creature. Nia manages to defeat Livewire by trapping her in a bubble, where she overloads herself. Unbeknownst to Nia, Amanda Waller is following her movements. Jimmy Olsen is mutated into a huge turtle monster that begins terrorizing Metropolis, but Bibbo Bibbowski and Professor Hamilton manages to cure him. Superman reassures Lois Lane that he will be fine when enemies start attacking the Fortress of Solitude. Lois Lane and Kelex fight off the intruders. Superman is nearly taken over, but a mysterious subdermal nanobot implanted on him immobilizes the spores. Unbeknownst to Superman and Lois Lane, Brainiac is revealed to be the one who implanted the nanobot because he has plans for Superman.

==== Titans: Beast World Tour – Gotham ====
While Nightwing takes Batman to Blüdhaven, the mutated Batman wakes up and escapes to Gotham City. Killer Croc deals with the mutated humans that were affected by Beast Boy's spores when he himself gets infected and gains a more crocodile-like form. Nightwing confronts the mutated Killer Croc who nearly kills him, but the mutated Batman saves him and the both of them defeat Killer Croc. Nightwing electrocutes the mutated Batman to knock him unconscious and transports him with the help of Barbara Gordon to Titans Tower. Meanwhile, a mutated Harley Quinn (who has transformed into a giant rabbit) scares a henchmen into giving her his phone for secret intel. Jason Todd has been mutated into a red wolf who takes down armored cops and kills a villain named Vermin who mutated into a naked mole-rat. Huntress confronts Stephen Wallers for his corruption when she mutates into a black panther due to Beast Boy's spores. She nearly kills Stephen when Cassandra Cain calms her down by using a laser pointer. Stephanie Brown goes to a Disaster Food bank due to police requiring her aid with someone attacking them. She defeats the attacker who turns out to be Killer Moth, who has mutated into a cockroach-like creature before leaving the crime scene.

==== Titans: Beast World Tour – Central City ====
Irey West interrupts Barry Allen and Iris West dancing to tell them that people in Central City are mutating into animals thanks to Beast Boy's spores. Barry initially doesn't want to deal with it in order to spend time with Iris, but changes his mind when he hears Godspeed is there. Irey saves Barry from one of Godspeed's attacks, and after a pep-talk from Iris, Barry suits up as the Flash to fight the monsters. Wallace West and Avery Ho have to defeat with a mutant squirrel (who is actually Fadeaway Man) who has electricity abilities and is trying to cause a blackout in the city. One of Beast Boy's spores tries attaching itself to Wallace and Avery, but they both free themselves and try freeing the rest of the civilians. Barry modifies the Cosmic treadmill in order to send a message to the Flash Family to help people, but Irey tells Barry that Iris is in trouble. Irey tries calling Jai West who is on a date with Animal Man's daughter Maxine Baker who can control animals. Jai deals with Godspeed who has mutated into a murderous hornet. Godspeed nearly kills Jai, but Maxine saves his life and Jai manages to defeat Godspeed. Barry sees that Iris mutated into a cuttlefish, but frees her and Jai kills the spore. Julien Jourdain (a new hero who goes by the name Circuit Breaker) defeats a mutated Bart Allen and frees him from Beast Boy's control. All the remaining speedsters arrive in Iron Heights to find Godspeed and the other mutated villains wreaking havoc. The speedsters are initially overwhelmed, but Maxine persuades them to be willingly mutated to defeat Godspeed as they are turned into humanoid bees. After the speedsters defeat Godspeed, Maxine uses Iris to calm them down and free them from Beast Boy's control, and the mutated speedsters help Central City citizens in any way they can.

==== Titans: Beast World Tour – Atlantis ====
In Atlantis, Aquaman tries to fight off mutated humans who are attacking his daughter while Garth and his girlfriend Tula are attacked by people affected by Beast Boy's spores. Aquaman, Mera and Kaldur'ahm (Aqualad) meet up with them to devise a plan to take down the mutated Atlanteans which includes a mutated King Shark (who was mutated into a shark/tiger hybrid). While Aquaman tries to save Garth, he is nearly affected by Beast Boy's spores, transforming him into an unspecified humanoid reptile. He is quickly defeated by Mera. Garth tries to find Brother Eternity while Mera is forced to imprison the mutated Aquaman. Aqualad manages to free some of the mutated Atlanteans by electrocuting them, but Mera is mutated into a fish while trying to save Aqualad. Mera nearly kills Aqualad, but her child saves Aqualad and drives the mutated Mera away by using telepathy. Captain Boomerang, Vixen, and Deadeye try to stop Black Manta (who was mutated into a stingray) from wreaking havoc across the ocean. They manage to free Black Manta by destroying Beast Boy's spores while Captain Boomerang reports to Amanda Waller what happened. It is revealed she is keeping Dolphin (one of Aquaman's allies who was mutated into a dolphin) hostage and forces a Beast Boy spore on her.

==== Titans: Beast World Tour – Star City ====
Green Arrow and Connor Hawke follow the infected humans to Star City Aquarium, where they see two villainous twins calling themselves the Resurrection Twins kidnapping the mutated animals and torturing them to gain power. Oliver Queen wants to take down the Resurrection Twins immediately, but Connor wants to save the mutated animals as he sees them as human beings. The Resurrection Twins unleash their aquatic villains while Green Arrow manages to shock the Resurrection Twins with his electric arrow as he is overwhelmed by the mutated humans. Connor manages to save Green Arrow by creating his own Pulse arrow which distracts the mutated animals. Then both of them reconcile with each other. Red Canary teams up with Black Canary to fight the mutated animals like Cheshire (who was mutated into a cat) and save the civilians, but Black Canary is mutated into a yellow canary by Beast Boy's spores. Stargirl and Huntress save Red Arrow from Alan Scott (who was mutated into a frog) and Boom (who was mutated into an alligator) and the three of them quickly subdue the mutated heroes.

== Reading order ==
=== Prelude ===
- Tales of the Titans #4
- Titans (Volume 4) #5

=== Main Plot ===
- Titans: Beast World #1-6

=== Tie-Ins ===
- Titans: Beast World – Waller Rising #1
- Titans: Beast World Tour – Metropolis #1
- Titans: Beast World Tour – Gotham #1
- Action Comics #1060
- Titans (Volume 4) #6-7
- Titans: Beast World Tour – Central City #1
- Titans: Beast World Tour – Atlantis #1
- Titans: Beast World – Star City #1
- Nightwing (Volume 4) #109-110

=== Aftermath issue ===
- Titans (Volume 4) #8

== Critical reception ==
According to Comicbook Roundup, Titans: Beast World received an average rating of 8.6 out of 10 based on 60 reviews. Michael Woods from AIPT wrote "overall, this is another compelling story with great work from the entire creative team involved."
