= Cary Burkett =

American broadcaster and writer

- Born: Cary D. Burkett
- Area: Writer
- Notable works: Detective Comics "Nemesis"; The Warlord; World's Finest Comics

Cary Burkett is an American radio broadcaster and former comic book writer best known for co-creating the DC Comics character Nemesis with artist Dan Spiegle.

== Biography ==
Cary Burkett attended the University of Texas at Austin and earned a BFA degree in theatre. He moved to New York City and performed in Off-Broadway productions and wrote comic books for DC Comics. His first credits for DC were writing text articles and responses to readers' letters in the letter columns of various titles. Burkett's first published comic book story was titled "When You Wish Upon A Star" and appeared in House of Mystery #255 (November–December 1977). His best known comics work is the character Nemesis. The character's civilian secret identity of Thomas Tresser was created by Burkett in 1979 and named for an actor with whom he was rooming with in New Hampshire. The character debuted in an eight-page backup story in The Brave and the Bold #166 (September 1980) written by Burkett and drawn by Dan Spiegle. The "Nemesis" feature ran in issues #166 through 192, and the character teamed-up with the Batman in #170 and #193. Another Burkett-created character, the Swashbuckler, debuted in Detective Comics #493 (Aug. 1980) but never appeared again.

In 1983, artist Rich Buckler recruited Burkett to write the Mighty Crusaders title for Archie Comics. That same year saw Burkett begin a two-year run on DC's The Warlord title. He wrote for Marvel Comics as well, scripting an adaptation of the Sheena film and stories for Marvel Team-Up and The Spectacular Spider-Man. Upon finishing his run on The Warlord with issue #99 (November 1985), Burkett left the comics industry.

Following his departure from comics, Burkett relocated to Pennsylvania and became a radio broadcaster for WITF-FM in Harrisburg. He hosted Classical Air, a classical music program. In 2011, he was a poetry reader for the Sunderman Conservatory of Music at Gettysburg College.

== Bibliography ==
=== Archie Comics ===
- The Mighty Crusaders #4–5, 7–8 (1983–1984)

=== DC Comics ===
- Adventure Comics #459–460 (Green Lantern) (1978)
- The Amazing World of DC Comics #16 (text article) (1977)
- The Brave and the Bold #143, 147, 153, 156, 160, 168, 170, 193 (Batman team-ups); #166–169, 171–178, 180–192 (Nemesis backup feature) (1978–1982)
- Cancelled Comic Cavalcade #1 (1978)
- DC Comics Presents #60 (Superman and the Guardians of the Universe) (1983)
- DC Special Series #19 (Wonder Woman) (1979)
- Detective Comics #488, 492–493 (Batman); 491–499, 501–502, 505–506, 508–510, 512–517 (Batgirl backup feature) (1980–1982)
- Ghosts #104 (1981)
- Green Lantern #107–110 (1978)
- House of Mystery #255, 271 (1977–1979)
- House of Secrets #151 (1978)
- Justice League of America #218 (1983)
- Men of War #4–6, 9–11, 21–23 (1978–1979)
- Secrets of Haunted House #14, 40 (1978–1981)
- Superman #328 ("Private Life of Clark Kent" backup feature) (1978)
- The Superman Family #195–196 ("Private Life of Clark Kent" backup feature) (1979)
- The Unexpected #190 (1979)
- Unknown Soldier #243–248, 254–256 (1980–1981)
- The Warlord #72–99, Annual #2–4 (1983–1985)
- Weird War Tales #59, 92 (1978–1980)
- World's Finest Comics #265–266, 268, 272–274, 277, 279–287 (1980–1983)

==== Collected editions ====
- Tales of the Batman: Don Newton includes The Brave and the Bold #153, 156, and Detective Comics #488, 492–493; 360 pages, December 2011, ISBN 1401232949
- Batgirl: The Bronze Age Omnibus Volume 2 includes Detective Comics #491-499, 501–502, 505–506, 508–510, 512–517; 576 pages, April 2019, ISBN 978-1401288419

=== Marvel Comics ===
- Marvel Super Special #34 (Sheena) (1984)
- Marvel Team-Up #139, 144, 146–148 (1984)
- The Spectacular Spider-Man #101–102 (1985)

Preceded by Dennis O'Neil	"Batman" feature in Detective Comics writer 1980	Succeeded by Michael Fleisher
Preceded by Mike W. Barr	"Batgirl" feature in Detective Comics writer 1980–1982	Succeeded by Barbara Kesel
Preceded by Dennis O'Neil	World's Finest Comics writer 1980–1983	Succeeded by Mike W. Barr and Marv Wolfman
Preceded by Mike Grell and Sharon Wright Grell	The Warlord writer 1983–1985	Succeeded by Michael Fleisher
