= Amethyst, Princess of Gemworld =

DC Comics superheroine

Amethyst
- Amethyst as depicted in Young Justice vol. 3 #1 (March 2019). Art by Amy Reeder.

Publication information
- Publisher: DC Comics
- First appearance: Legion of Super-Heroes #298 (April 1983)
- Created by: Dan Mishkin; Gary Cohn; Ernie Colón

In-story information
- Alter ego: Amaya / Amethyst (birth name); Amy Winston (human name)
- Species: Human (cosmic entity)
- Place of origin: Gemworld
- Team affiliations: House of Amethyst; The Banned; Lords of Order; Justice League Dark; Young Justice
- Partnerships: Citrine
- Notable aliases: Princess of Gemworld
- Abilities: Vast sorcery; Occultism; Dimensional lordship; Expert swordswoman and other weaponry; Proficiency in archery; Skilled hand-to-hand combatant

Amethyst is a sword and sorcery superheroine published in American comic books created by DC Comics. Created by writers Dan Mishkin, Gary Cohn and artist Ernie Colón, she debuted in Legion of Super-Heroes #298 in April 1983. While considered one of DC Comics' "under-rated classics" for its female representation and strong fantasy themes, the character's eponymous series struggled to engage the broader contemporary DC readership.

While subjected to various revisions, the character's history consolidates her as Amy Winston, a young girl who discovered her origins to the extradimensional Gemworld, a magical realm ruled by twelve families themed after gemstones and with strong ties to the Lords of Chaos and Order; born as Princess Amaya of the House of Amethyst, Amy is sent to Earth by her sorceress nanny Citrine to prevent her assassination by the villain, Dark Opal. Discovering the truth on her 13th birthday, Amy returns to Gemworld and inherits both her magical abilities and responsibilities as the last scion of House Amethyst, balancing her life on Earth with her duties as princess of Gemworld, making her a prominent protector and Lord of Order.

Briefly, the New 52 revised her origin as a princess of Nilia raised by her mother, Queen Graciel to help eventually liberate Gemworld from a tyrannical ruler and reclaim their throne. This was reversed, with small aspects such as the "Amaya" birth name retained.

The character has received several media adaptations, having been featured in a short animation series featured on the DC Nation block on Cartoon Network.

== Publication history ==
=== Concept and creation ===
Amethyst's premise was pitched to DC Comics under the title "Changeling", wherein its main character had been left on Earth as an infant. However, because another DC superhero formerly named Beast Boy was currently using that name at the time, Dan Mishkin decided on the alternative "Amethyst" as a replacement. This in turn inspired the jewel-themed renaming of the other characters in the series and the concept being reworked into Gemworld.

=== Comic book appearances ===
Cover of issue #6 of the original 1983 maxi-series.

Amethyst first appeared as a special insert preview in Legion of Super-Heroes #298 (April 1983). Her original story began shortly afterward in the twelve-issue Amethyst: Princess of Gemworld limited series in 1983, written and created by Dan Mishkin and Gary Cohn with Ernie Colón as the artist. The initial 12-issue limited series (identified by DC Comics as a "maxi-series") establishes Gemworld, Amethyst's identity, and several of her recurring villains. The limited series was followed by a 1984 annual and a sixteen-issue ongoing series. The ongoing series was followed by the 1986 Amethyst Special one-shot and a four-issue limited series that ended the character's adventures (penciled by Esteban Maroto). There was also a one-shot with Superman in DC Comics Presents #63 (Nov. 1983).

The character re-emerged in 2005 after 18 years of sporadic appearances, in the Infinite Crisis mini-series. In 2012, Amethyst appeared as the main character of the new Sword of Sorcery as part of The New 52 line. The series continued until May 2013, when Sword of Sorcery was cancelled. Concurrently in 2012, DC published an Amethyst volume of the Showcase Presents series. It reprinted the character's appearances in The Legion of Super-Heroes #298, the original Amethyst, Princess of Gemworld 12-issue limited series, Amethyst Annual #1, DC Comics Presents #63, and the first 11 issues of the 16-issue ongoing Amethyst series.

In 2019, DC relaunched the Young Justice title, with Amethyst as one of the members. A six-issue miniseries Amethyst (2020) by Amy Reeder was published the following year.

== Characterization ==
=== Amy Winston / Amethyst ===
In physical appearance, Amy appears as a 5'1" and 90lbs child with blond hair and violet eyes. While she retains the same physical features in an adult form within Gemworld, her height is instead stated to be 5'8" and 112lbs. Following her appearances after New 52, the character is consistently 5'8" and 122 lbs as she was previously although she is depicted more teenaged in appearance. While she is a natural blonde, the character is designed to have dyed her hair lavender.

During the character's publication in the first and second Amethyst series, she is described as having evolved in personality; beginning as an ordinary and spirited American child whose life revolved around her friends and family, this changed following her 13th birthday and discovery of Gemworld, where she learned of her potential as a sorceress and princess status. She would acclimate quickly into the role, eventually prioritizing it over her former life on Earth. Amethyst is also characterized as being a potentially powerful sorceress due to her heritage as a Lord of Order; A crossover with Doctor Fate implies she is among the most powerful beings in the DC Universe.

In more recent publications, she retains a similar characterization but is more rebellious in personality and attempts to balance between the role and a normal human life on Earth. She also retains her status as a Lord of Order in human form. In the 2021 Amethyst limited series, the character is sixteen and is temporarily branded a rogue and while House Amethyst was officially dissolved, she is instead made princess of the Banned.

=== Gemworld ===
The primary setting in which the character's stories takes place is the extradimensional realm known as Gemworld (also known as Nilaa or The Gem); a magical dimension once under dominion of the Lord of Chaos, In the realm, Gemworld simulates but is not bound by the laws of physics, with concepts such as gravity being dependent on the magical inhabitants' whims, and consists of one great land mass surrounded by a sea with several clusters of islands and is circular and around in a never ending falls, with what's below remaining unknown. Gemworld also features a sun as a living entity that that blazes its energy throughout the day in its orbit but becomes a moon when its energies wane, simulating day and night. The dimension came to house countless magical creatures, beings, humans, and homo magi following an exodus to the dimension led by a young witch known as Citrina to preserve magic and creatures (unicorns, imps, dragons, etc.) of magical origin when magic begin waning following a major supernova in space and its violent explosions affecting the physical and mystically plain, disrupting "zodiac alignments" and had major repercussions in which included the gradual waning of mystical energies.

The ruling community, the twelve houses modelling and themed after gemstones (Amethyst, Aquamarine, Diamond, Emerald, Garnet, Moonstone, Opal, Ruby, Sapphire, Sardonyx, Turquoise, and Topaz), each rule a portion of Gemworld in which aligns with the properties of their respective gemstone, also form a Council of Houses that governs Gemworld. Throughout its history, several of the houses has assumed supreme rule; the first being the House of Ruby. Much later, the House of Amethyst became the supreme rulers of Gemworld, credited as had the longest and beneficial reign until the House of Opal, led by the villain Dark Opal and with assistance of Lords of Chaos Vandaemon, overthrew the House of Amethyst and its supporter from the Lords of Order, Pantagones, using underhanded tactics. An infant Princess Amethyst is hidden away by Witch-Mother Citrina in an effort to preserve the House of Amethyst.

Later stories revise some of Gemworld's history, omitting the historically recent involvement of the Lords of Chaos and Order (Pantagones and Vandaemon respectively), and cast the House of Amethyst's prior rulers to Amethyst as morally corrupt. House Diamond is also stated to be responsible for Gemworld's legislative duties and includes the Banned, historical Gemworld outcasts whom previously opposed the unification of the twelve houses and were nearly wiped out, with a remnant surviving and becoming a travelling band of mercenaries and criminals. Over time, they became less dangerous.

== Fictional character biography ==
Amethyst is the princess of the House of Amethyst, one of several houses in Gemworld. After Dark Opal kills Amethyst's parents, the witch Citrina sends her to Earth to be raised by the Winston family. At the age of thirteen, Amethyst is attacked by Dark Opal, learns of her heritage, and returns to Gemworld, where she defeats Dark Opal and frees Gemworld from his rule.

Amethyst participates in the events of Crisis on Infinite Earths, where she is blinded by a Shadow Demon. She later learns that she is a Lord of Order and battles the Lord of Chaos Child before fusing herself and Child with Gemworld. The third volume of Amethyst takes place two decades after Crisis on Infinite Earths. Topaz and Turquoise, members of their namesake houses, are married and have three children: Wrynn, Donal, and Amber. The entity Mordru possesses Wrynn and becomes a powerful sorcerer. Some time later, Gemworld is transported to the main universe and renamed Zerox. Zerox is destroyed during the Magic Wars in the 30th century, which kills Amethyst. Amethyst is resurrected during the Infinite Crisis event, which retcons her death from continuity.

=== New 52 ===
Following the New 52 reboot, Amethyst's history is heavily revised. Her real name is Amaya and she originated from the realm of Niliaa, but was raised on Earth as Amy Winston by her mother, Lady Graciel. Trained as a warrior in secret and being a troubled high-school student, she learns of her true history on her 17th birthday and helps her mother liberate Nilaa from the tyrannical rule of Lady Mordiel Garciel's sister and fellow member of the Amethyst bloodline. She also later battles Eclipso and later joins the Justice League Dark.

==== DC Rebirth onwards ====
During DC Rebirth, much of the character's history and characterization resemble more closely to her prior version in pre-Crisis on Infinite Earths albeit with differences; having faced Dark Opal and Lords of Chaos in the past, her history omits her ascension as a Lord of Order and roughly continue from her second series, wherein she has since come into frequent conflict with the Council of Houses due to her rampant disregard for their rulings as a rebel but is protected due to her heroic and legendary status in Gemworld.

In the 2019 Young Justice series, the first storyline showcases her teaming up with Young Justice when Dark Opal's chaotic and dark magical abilities grow more powerful to the point of being able to alter reality and being great enough to intimidate the Council of Houses, in which some members are reluctant on frequently challenging and decline Amethyst's plea to come together and discuss on ridding of House of Opal altogether. As Dark Opal conspires to once more take dominion of Gemworld and to destroy Amethyst and her kingdom, the team assists in defeating him. She later leaves to return to Earth to aid the Young Justice team, unaware the Council had used the opportunity to banish and exile her from Gemworld unbeknownst to her.

In the 2021 Amethyst series, Amethyst returns to Gemworld on her sixteenth birthday to find her kingdom in ruins and subjects vanished. Coldly received by ally Lady Turquoise and shunned by the other Houses, she suspects Dark Opal's manipulations but learns of the House of Diamond's involvement. Aided by Maxxie of Aquamarine, Phoss, and Prince Topaz, she uncovers the House Diamond's culpability in a confrontation with their court: the court learned her birth parents were alive and preserved in amethyst and also discovered her parents' failed conspiracy to seize Gemworld's throne. Provoking Dark Opal in hopes his tyrannical reign would instill loyalty, they faked their deaths and plotted a triumphant return via Citrina's aid but this effort was thwarted when the amethyst preserving their body was stolen. Illegitimating House Amethyst's claim as a supreme house, the court dissolve it, trap her subjects in amethyst, and brand her a rogue from belief she was aware of the conspiracy. Breaking free and with help from Aquamarine and the outcast Banned, Amethyst defeats Dark Opal's bid to annihilate her birth parents, liberates her subjects and family (destroying all amethyst crystals in the process and depowering her kingdom, to her parents' chagrin), and accepts the Banned's offer to become their princess after realizing her birth parent's power hungry and selfish nature.

== Powers and abilities ==
A Lord of Order in human form, Amethyst is a trainee sorceress with a vast array of magical powers originating from the magic of House Amethyst. She is capable of spell-casting, energy manipulation, flight, and transmutation. In addition to her magical powers, Amethyst is also an expert swordswoman. This background makes her adept with various weapons, archery, and strategy. She is also credited as having strong leadership abilities and courage despite her young age.

=== New 52 version ===
The version seen in New 52's Sword and Sorcery featured an alternative portrayal; while an expert swordswoman and wielding the magical powers of House Amethyst and House Turquioise; she carried part of Amethyst bloodline's complete power (the remaining others carried by her mother and corrupt aunt) and can enhance her physical abilities, create constructs made up of light-esque constructs, and could act as a catalyst for other magical powers. Her Turquoise bloodline grants her some abilities in transformative powers. She is also skilled hand-to-hand combatant and also similarly is skilled in several different weaponry.

== Supporting cast ==
Within various Amethyst-related comic book titles, the characters have attained both re-occurring and newer cast members overtime; her adoptive parents, Herb and Marion Winston, received her shortly after the birth of their biological child was a stillborn. A Hudson English professor and child psychologist respectively, the pair raised her as an ordinary girl until her origins revealed themselves, reluctantly supporting her superheroics. Her sorceress guardian and servant of House Amethyst, Citrine, acts as a mentor figure with knowledge of Gemworld's history and mystical arts. Lord Garnet, a ruler of a section of Gemworld known as the Stormy Peaks, served as her mentor in physical arts and had known her parents in the past.

In the 2020 Amethyst series, the character's new supporting cast includes allies Phoss and Maxixe, who assist her when Gemworld's ruling class considers House Amethyst rogue despite Amethyst's arrogance; Phoss is a young, multi-armed warrior whose travel companion is Stan, a creature resembling a large callepillar. Phoss's love interest is Elba, who is a fan of Earth's culture. Maxixe is introduced as "Prince Aquamarine" alongside his mother, "Lady Aquamarine" but a frustrated Maxixe reveals himself a political decoy alongside his mother, who is also a decoy for the real Lady Aquamarine.

=== Enemies ===
Having an established array of villains, the most re-occurring is Dark Opal, an agent for the Lords of Chaos and ambitious conqueror who feuded with House Amethyst before overthrowing them as the leading ruling houses after making a pact with the Lords of Chaos in return for greater mystical power and mastery, rivaled only by the Amethyst. The 2020 series revealed his enmity from House Amethyst also stemmed from strategic provocation; previous stories granted a more benevolent portrayal of Lord and Lady Amethyst but the 2020 series characterized the pair as morally corrupt and interested in securing their political authority, with prior benevolent characterization being both deliberate deception and biased accounts.

== Other versions ==
An alternate timeline version of Amethyst appears Flashpoint as a member of the Secret Seven.

== Collected editions ==
Date	Name	ISBN	Ref.
October 2, 2012	Showcase Presents: Amethyst, Princess of Gemworld Vol. 1	978-1401236779	
November 9, 2021	Amethyst Princess of Gemworld	978-1779501226	

== In other media ==
=== Television ===
Amethyst and Quartz as they appeared in DC Nation Shorts.

- Amethyst appears in a self-titled segment of DC Nation Shorts, voiced by Sophie Oda. This version is a human who is magically transported into the Gemworld video game to battle the forces of Dark Opal and sports a modernized design reminiscent of magical girls.
- Amethyst makes non-speaking cameo appearances in Teen Titans Go!.
- Amethyst will appear in Starfire!.

=== Film ===
- Amethyst appears in DC Super Hero Girls: Hero of the Year, voiced by Cristina Pucelli.
- Amethyst makes a non-speaking cameo appearance in Teen Titans Go! To the Movies.

=== Video games ===
Amethyst appears as a character summon in Scribblenauts Unmasked: A DC Comics Adventure.
