= Shadow Fighters =

Group of fictional characters

Publication information
- Publisher: DC Comics
- First appearance: Eclipso #11 (September 1993)
- Created by: Robert Loren Fleming; Audwynn Jermaine Newman

Shadow Fighters were a group of superpowered and non-superpowered DC Comics characters brought together, under the supervision of Amanda Waller, for the sole purpose of battling Eclipso in the Eclipso comic series. They were brought together in issue #11 (September 1993) and disbanded through attrition in issue #13 (November 1993). They were created by Robert Loren Fleming and Audwynn Jermaine Newman.

== History ==
Eclipso's takeover of a small, South American country is investigated originally by the small team of Bruce Gordon, Mona Bennet, and explorer Cave Carson. Cave is attacked by Eclipso's forces, has both his legs broken and is left outside the border of the country.

The slightly mad hero Creeper, along with Bruce and Mona, have several adventures inside Eclipso's country, from which they barely escape.

In #13, the fight against Eclipso has gained new members, led by the former Suicide Squad leader Amanda Waller. A portion of the group are sent to Eclipso's stronghold. Creeper, Peacemaker, Doctor Mid-Nite, Major Victory, Commander Steel, the second Wildcat and Manhunter all are killed. It is later revealed that the Manhunter slain was a 'ringer', another man brought in to fight under the costume. The only survivor of the strike force is Nemesis, at least at the time. Despite parts of his body being found, Creeper would return from his murder.

Another, smaller team is sent in to retrieve the bodies, which had been collected in one spot for Eclipso's amusement. His rage at seeing the bodies gone leads him to murder an innocent slave.

Nightshade and Chunk join with Nemesis. Assisted by Doctor Bennet, the father of Bruce's wife, they persist in their observation of Eclipso's territory. Eclipso lobs a nuclear missile at their base, destroying it completely. However, the small group escapes via one of Nightshade's portals, opened onto the floor of the United Nations. Midway through the portal, Bennet is kidnapped by Eclipso, but manages to survive this ordeal.

The literal appearance of the Fighters on the floor of the United Nations (and the accidental squashing of an innocent Eclipsed ambassador) soon leads to a renewed effort against Eclipso. The surviving Shadow Fighters lead a much larger team of heroes back into Eclipso's territory, driving him out person by person.

== Members ==
- Amanda Waller - supervisor, not a field operative.
- Bruce Gordon
- Cave Carson - injured, abandoned.
- Chunk
- Creeper - originally dies, since reappeared.
- Doctor Bennet
- Major Victory - killed in action.
- Mona Bennet - field operative
- Peacemaker - originally KIA, reappeared in Blue Beetle #3
- Doctor Mid-Nite - KIA
- Wildcat - KIA
- Commander Steel - KIA
- Manhunter (ringer) - KIA
- Nemesis
- Will Magnus

== Resources ==
- DCU Guide: Eclipso #11
- DCU Guide: Eclipso #12
- DCU Guide: Eclipso #13
