= Cosmic entity =

Cosmic entity can refer to:

== Cosmology ==
- An entity that exists within the cosmos

== Religion and spirituality ==
- An aspect of God in Judaism in the theology of Shneur Zalman of Liadi (d. 1812)
- In mythology, any of the major components of the created cosmos (e.g. earth, heaven, sea, night, dawn, etc.)
- The deification of such concepts, i.e. any cosmological deity

== Occultism and Theosophy ==
- A transcendent concept intended to replace or supplement the traditional concept of 'God':
  - In the writings of Gottfried de Purucker (1935)
  - In the writings of the Theosophist Alice Bailey (1920s-1940s)
  - In the Ascended Master Teachings, a group of religions based on Theosophy, a cosmic entity is equivalent to a cosmic being

== Popular culture ==
- Dimethyltryptamine#Entity encounters: Terence McKenna described 'machine elves'.
- A term used in the Cthulhu Mythos, the fictional religion of H. P. Lovecraft, for the unthinkably vast, indifferent, or actively hostile eldritch entities or gods
