= Amanda Waller =

DC Comics character

- Amanda Waller as depicted in Suicide Squad vol. 5 #8 (February 2017). Art by Giuseppe Camuncoli (layouts), Francesco Mattina (finished art), and Hi-Fi Design (colors).

Publication information
- Publisher: DC Comics
- First appearance: Legends #1 (November 1986)
- Created by: John Ostrander; Len Wein; John Byrne

In-story information
- Full name: Amanda Belle Waller (née Blake)
- Species: Human
- Team affiliations: National Security Agency; United States Army; Suicide Squad; Agency; Checkmate; A.R.G.U.S. Shadow Fighters; Team 7
- Abilities: Expert strategist and tactician; Skilled martial artist and hand-to-hand combatant; Expert markswoman

Amanda Belle Waller (née Blake), also known as "the Wall", is a fictional character featured in American comic books published by DC Comics. The character first appeared in Legends #1 in 1986 and was created by John Ostrander, Len Wein, and John Byrne. A bureaucrat with a distaste for conventional crime fighting, who employs more hardline methods and is an expert tactician and political operator, the character serves as both an ally and an antagonist to the superheroes of the DC Universe. Waller is often depicted as a non-powered, high-ranking government official and the leader of Task Force X (known as the Suicide Squad), a secret black-ops group composed of super-villains, current or former, undertaking high-risk missions as expendable agents for commuted prison sentences in return. Additionally, she is also commonly associated with several government agencies such as Checkmate, the Department of Extranormal Operations (D.E.O), and A.R.G.U.S.

The character has been adapted into other media on a number of occasions, notably voiced by CCH Pounder in her animated debut in the DC Animated Universe, with Pam Grier originating the character in live action on the TV show Smallville. She first appeared in a film played by Academy Award-nominee Angela Bassett in Green Lantern. Most prominently, she has been portrayed by Academy Award-winner Viola Davis in the DC Extended Universe series of films and TV shows, starting in Suicide Squad (2016), acting as one of the franchise's most prominent recurring characters. Her portrayal continued into the rebooted DC Universe, beginning with Creature Commandos.

== Publication history ==
Amanda Waller's earliest appearances were shaped by writers John Ostrander and Kim Yale in 1987, during the first volume of Suicide Squad and shortly after being introduced in the Legends crossover storyline.

== Fictional character biography ==
=== Early history ===
Amanda Waller was established as a widow who escaped Chicago's Cabrini–Green housing projects with her surviving family after her two eldest children and her husband were murdered. Waller excelled in political science and became a congressional aide. During that time, she discovered the existence of the first two incarnations of the Squad. Taking elements from both, she proposed the development of its third incarnation of the White House and was placed in charge upon its approval.

=== Federal service years ===
Amanda Waller formed the Agency to serve as a small, quasi-independent branch of Task Force X. Valentina Vostok brought former NYPD Lieutenant Harry Stein into the agency as an operative. Amanda Waller later promoted Stein to the command position and demoted Vostok. Harry Stein would later reorganize the Agency and name it Checkmate.

Waller's tenure as the official of the third Suicide Squad was tumultuous and controversial. Despite many successes, she developed a habit of defying her superiors in Washington to achieve legitimate and personal goals on more than one occasion. The earliest conflict between her and her superiors revolved around the leadership of the Suicide Squad. Although she wanted the Bronze Tiger—a martial artist she helped recover after he had been brainwashed by the League of Assassins—to lead the team, he was relegated to second-in-command, and Rick Flag Jr. was made the leader instead. Waller resentfully presumed the situation to be racially charged, related to her status as a black woman and Bronze Tiger's skin tone. However, the Tiger himself did not believe this was a factor, considering this resulted from mistrust due to the brainwashing imposed upon him by the League of Assassins.

Her relationship with the squad itself was one of mutual dislike. Most of the team's criminal members did not take to Waller's methods (most notably Captain Boomerang), and even the team's heroes were often at odds with Waller. Waller's inability to deal and compromise with her troops led to Nemesis's departure from the team and the death of a US senator, which indirectly caused the death of Rick Flag Jr. These types of conflicts, however, were not only limited to her superiors and her team but also extended to Batman, who opposed the forming of the Suicide Squad (although he would later help to reform it). Nonetheless, the team remained loyal to her, often choosing to side with her instead of the government.

It was revealed that Amanda Waller kept heroes such as Nightshade around for them to act as her conscience. Throughout her first run with the Suicide Squad, her actions became increasingly erratic as she fought to retain control of the squad. This was heightened by the public revelation of the Suicide Squad and Waller being officially "replaced", although her replacement was, in fact, an actor, and Waller remained the team's director.

Even that secret would eventually be revealed, and Amanda Waller would be imprisoned. During this time, the squad also became involved in an interagency conflict in a crossover between the Checkmate and Suicide Squad titles called the Janus Directive.

One of the field missions is against her will, as many members of the squad, Waller included, are forcibly kidnapped and taken to Apokolips. This is because team member Duchess remembered her past as Lashina of the Female Furies instead of pretending to be amnesiac and wished to return home with suitable sacrifices. The squad suffers fatalities battling Apokolips' forces, with Waller personally confronting Granny Goodness. However, the confrontation ended with the deaths of Dr. Light and one of Waller's nieces, and Count Vertigo was near-fatally wounded.

She eventually found herself serving prison time for her pursuit of an organized crime cartel based in New Orleans called the LOA and killing its leadership, using squad operatives Ravan, Poison Ivy and Deadshot in the process.

=== The Suicide Squad's rebirth ===
Waller is eventually pardoned and released a year later to reorganize the Suicide Squad as a freelance mercenary group at the behest of Sarge Steel to deal with a crisis in Vlatava, Count Vertigo's home country. Afterward, the Suicide Squad performed a variety of missions, often treading dangerous political terrain when dealing with Soviet and Israeli interests. Most notably, the Squad helped destroy the plans of a shadow organization to throw Qurac, Israel, and the US into political disarray.

During her renewed tenure with this team, Amanda became closer to her operatives, even accompanying them on their field missions. This allowed Waller and her team to bond more effectively, although she retained her dominant and threatening personality.

Waller quit after a later field mission, in which she took down the immortal dictator of a minor South American island nation. As it turned out, he was mortal, but had immense psychic power. By tricking him, Waller merely provided a form of assisted suicide.

Soon after, Amanda Waller organized the Shadow Fighters to confront Eclipso. Again, she encountered Sarge Steel. Her first attempt at a team formed with the assistance of Bruce Gordon and his wife, Mona could have gone better. Most of the group were killed while infiltrating Eclipso's stronghold. Her second attempt with a much larger team had much more success.

During the "Bloodlines" event, the President sent Guy Gardner to fetch Waller from her island 'retirement'. She leads a multi-hero affair that destroys the alien parasites. She rejoined federal service, initially as the Southeastern regional director for the Department of Extranormal Operations. She was then promoted to Secretary of Metahuman Affairs as a member of Lex Luthor's presidential administration.

=== International service ===
Lex Luthor's brief tenure in the office leads to Amanda Waller being jailed for a short time before being released by Luthor's successor, Jonathan Vincent Horne, who orders her to take command of the secret agent organization Checkmate. The organization had been shaken up due to The OMAC Project debacle and the related murderous leadership of Maxwell Lord, with whom Waller has had previous history. Waller takes the rank of Black King until the United States and United Nations decide what to do with that organization. In the latter issue of 52, Waller is shown commissioning the imprisoned Atom Smasher to organize a new Suicide Squad to attack Black Adam and his allies. This ends with the death of Squad member Persuader and the expected public relations turn against the Black Marvel family.

In the revamped Checkmate series set in the One Year Later continuity, Waller is shown to have been assigned by the UN to serve as Checkmate's White Queen, a member of its senior policy-making executive. Due to her previous activities, her appointment is contingent on having no direct control over operations. Regardless, she continues to pursue her agenda, secretly using the Suicide Squad to perform missions in favour of American interests and blackmailing Fire. It is also implied that she may have betrayed a mission team in an attempt to protect her secrets and facilitated an attack on Checkmate headquarters for her gain.

Amanda Waller as the White Queen in promotional art for Checkmate. Art by Jesus Saiz.

She is then in charge of Operation Salvation Run, an initiative involving the mass deportation of supervillains to an alien world. When the rest of Checkmate discovered this, she was forced into resigning as White Queen in exchange for their delay in revealing what the US government was doing. She continues to run the Suicide Squad and has been implanted with nanotechnology to allow her to control Chemo during missions directly.

During the Superman/Batman storyline "K", it is revealed that Waller has hoarded Kryptonite and used it to power an anti-Superman group called the Last Line and a Doomsday-like creature codenamed "All-American Boy", who has Kryptonite shards growing out of his body. All-American Boy (real name: Josh Walker) was deceived into an experiment using Kryptonite to bond cell scrapings taken from Doomsday to a human host, battles Superman, and devastates Smallville. With the help of Brannon, the Last Line's leader, Batman locates Josh's parents, who convince him to stop. Waller is forced to pay towards repairing Smallville in return for her dealings in the AAB project to remain secret. 'Last Line' itself rebels against Waller because of her deceptions.

In the eight-issue series of Suicide Squad: Raise the Flag, Waller is again seen leading the Suicide Squad at some point when the General returns to Earth after his exile and is promptly drafted into the Squad with unique explosive implants grafted into his arm and brain to make him compliant with Waller's demands. Here, she uses technology devised by Cliff Carmichael to gain a measure of control over Chemo, allowing her to use it for the Squad's benefit. Rick Flag is revealed to have survived the events at Jotunheim and was returned to Waller, who admitted to him Rick Flag Jr. was never anything but an alias, and that he was a brainwashed soldier remade into Flag to serve Wade Eiling's ends.

She leads, as Chemo, an attack on a Dubai supercorp intending to release a deadly virus. However, Carmichael, with Eiling and part of her team, betrays her as part of Eiling's plan to benefit from the release of the virus, and she is nearly killed when Eiling orders a compliant Flag to use her pen, a transmitter, to detonate her explosive implant. Instead, Flag, tricking him, detonates Eiling's own, releasing her and rejoining the Squad, refusing the chance of everyday life.

She later attempted to forcibly return several members of the Secret Six (Bane and Deadshot) to the Suicide Squad. When her plan backfired due to the events of Blackest Night and the defiance of the Six, she was shot by Deadshot and privately revealed to King Faraday to be their new secret leader, Mockingbird. When Faraday questioned the need to be informed of the situation and even the need to bring the Six under the banner of the Squad when she already controlled them, Waller merely shrugged it off. Faraday then questions Waller, "does your right hand even know what your left hand is doing?". Waller responds with, "Only on a need-to-know basis", implying that Faraday is also on a "need-to-know basis."

=== The New 52 ===
In The New 52 (a 2011 reboot of the DC Comics universe), Amanda Waller is shown to be in direct command of the Suicide Squad, choosing its members and having the final say over when and if their implanted explosives are detonated. It is revealed she requested command of a unit she could send to their deaths without regret after an operation she was involved in resulted in the deaths of all other squad members, including several she had personally recruited. She was also involved with Team 7 in some capacity while serving in the United States Army as a Captain, which led to her temporarily leaving the spy business. Also, this version of Amanda Waller is re-imagined as a young, thin woman in contrast with her original design.

Amanda Waller later formed the Justice League of America, which is separate from the main Justice League, where she is shown as the Director of A.R.G.U.S. She recruited James Gordon Jr., who was alive despite his apparent death at the hands of his sister Barbara while saving their mother. However, it is shown that James Jr. only agrees to join as he is in love with Waller.

During the "Forever Evil" storyline, Amanda Waller is shown at Belle Reve trying to get Black Manta to join the Suicide Squad when Deathstorm and Power Ring infiltrate the prison. Waller later contacts Deadshot to get the Suicide Squad back together. Later clues point to an imposter Waller causing trouble behind the scenes.

=== DC Rebirth ===
Amanda Waller returns to her original design with the DC Rebirth initiative. When Barack Obama confronts her about Task Force X, she convinces him the Suicide Squad needs to exist to deal with threats neither the President nor the Justice League can be aware of while conceding to nominate a non-criminal field leader to carry out her directives during missions and keep the convicts in line. She visits Rick Flag in Guantanamo Bay, where he had been imprisoned for disobeying direct instructions to save his teammates, and tries to convince him to work alongside supervillains for the greater good; she succeeds, releases him, and makes him the field leader of Task Force X.

In issue #11 of Suicide Squad (2016), as a part of DC Rebirth, Amanda Waller is shot and killed. Her death is confirmed in issue #12. However, issue #15 revealed that she faked her death with the help of Deadshot, who fired a bullet at her heart, and Enchantress, who magically moved the bullet to the most reparable part of the human heart. Because of this, she can use Deadshot against the villain Rustam and the international shadow organization known only as the People. During Infinite Frontier, she went to Earth 3 after her Suicide Squad fought against the Crime Syndicate of America in order to rule that world.

=== Dawn of DC ===
After the events of Dark Crisis, where the Justice League is resurrected, Amanda Waller approaches the Council of Light with a proposal to target metahumans for the danger they pose to humanity. After the events of Knight Terrors, the world fears superheroes and Waller gains more power. She steals the Nightmare Stone and Doctor Fate's helmet to create Doctor Hate.

In Titans: Beast World, Beast Boy transforms into a Starro to battle the Necrostar, after which Doctor Hate erases his memory and causes him to spread mutagenic spores around the world. Amanda Waller and Chunk destroy Beast Boy's body, but the Titans recover his spores and use them to reconstitute his body. In the aftermath, Waller takes control of the Hall of Justice and frames the Titans for the events.

It is revealed that Amanda Waller started to develop hatred for metahumans because a serial criminal known as Candyman killed her daughter and husband. The Crisis events as well as her experience in Earth 3 made her jaded and cruel. In Absolute Power, Waller works with Brainiac Queen and Failsafe to build an army of Amazos known as Task Force VII and drain the powers of metahumans. Waller is ultimately defeated and sentenced to life imprisonment in Belle Reve, where Nia Nal manipulates her memories to prevent her from accessing crucial information that can be used against the Justice League.

Not long after, Nia Nal took part in forming a new incarnation of the Secret Six.

== Powers and abilities ==
Waller is an analyst and leader whose knowledge of espionage, management skills, and ability to make difficult moral decisions makes her a prime candidate for leadership roles within government agencies. She employs ruthless tactics and is willing to sacrifice almost anything for an agenda; she is also an intimidating figure, politically influential, and specializes in dealing with super-powered beings.

Despite her unassuming frame, she is proficient in hand-to-hand combat and firearms.

== Other versions ==
=== DC Comics Bombshells ===
Amanda Waller appears in DC Comics Bombshells as the commander of the eponymous "Bombshells" project and Superintendent of the United States Military Academy during World War II.

=== DC Comics Secret Hero Society ===
Amanda Waller appears in DC Comics Secret Hero Society as the guidance counselor, truancy officer, and head of detention of the Justice Preparatory Academy.

=== Flashpoint ===
Amanda Waller appears in Flashpoint as an advisor to the President of the United States.

== In other media ==
=== Television ===
- Amanda Waller appears in Justice League Unlimited, voiced by CCH Pounder. This version is the leader of Project Cadmus and co-creator of the Ultimen, Galatea, Doomsday, and Batman (Terry McGinnis) who initially sees the Justice League as a threat before changing her views after being betrayed by her benefactor Lex Luthor.
- Amanda Waller appears in the ninth season of Smallville, portrayed by Pam Grier. This version is the "White Queen" of Checkmate and overseer of the Suicide Squad.
- Amanda Waller appears in Young Justice, voiced by Sheryl Lee Ralph. This version initially serves as the warden of Belle Reve before being replaced by Hugo Strange and overseer of Task Force X.
- Amanda Waller appears in Arrow, portrayed by Cynthia Addai-Robinson. This version is the director of A.R.G.U.S. and overseer of the Suicide Squad who is eventually killed by Shadowspire operatives and succeeded by Lyla Michaels.
- Amanda Waller appears in Harley Quinn, voiced by Tisha Campbell. This version is the overseer of the Suicide Squad.
- Amanda Waller appears in My Adventures with Superman, voiced by Debra Wilson. This version is a founding member and co-leader of Task Force X alongside General Sam Lane. During the second season, having founded the organization to eliminate alien threats, she gradually comes to disagree with Lane's methods over the years, leading to her demoting him with Checkmate's help and becoming the sole leader of Task Force X, to pursue their goals, Superman and his allies Lois Lane and Jimmy Olsen. After failing to thwart Brainiac's invasion of Metropolis, she becomes a fugitive after her crimes are exposed. In the third season, Waller returns to meet with Lex Luthor, who shows her his creation, the Eradicator, but due to the chaos, she arrests Luthor, and enlists the help of Superman and Lois's children, Jonathan and Lara Lane, among others, to confront the Eradicator. After the Eradicator's defeat, Waller is warned by Luthor that new galaxies have emerged since the destruction of Kandor.
- Amanda Waller appears in Suicide Squad Isekai, voiced by Kujira in the Japanese version and by Jasmine Renee Thomas in the English dub. This version is the director of A.R.G.U.S.

=== Film ===
- Amanda Waller appears in Superman/Batman: Public Enemies, voiced again by CCH Pounder. This version is depicted as more sympathetic than other incarnations.
- Amanda Waller appears in Green Lantern, portrayed by Angela Bassett. This version is a scientist for the Department of Extranormal Operations (DEO) whose family was killed by a shooter when she was younger.
- The Batman: Arkham incarnation of Amanda Waller appears in Batman: Assault on Arkham, voiced again by CCH Pounder.
- An alternate universe variant of Amanda Waller appears in Justice League: Gods and Monsters, voiced by Penny Johnson Jerald. This version is the President of the United States and is more sympathetic than other incarnations.
- Amanda Waller appears in the DC Animated Movie Universe (DCAMU) films Suicide Squad: Hell to Pay and Batman: Hush, voiced by Vanessa Williams. This version is the leader of Task Force X before dying from cancer and being succeeded by Harley Quinn.

=== DC Extended Universe and DC Universe ===
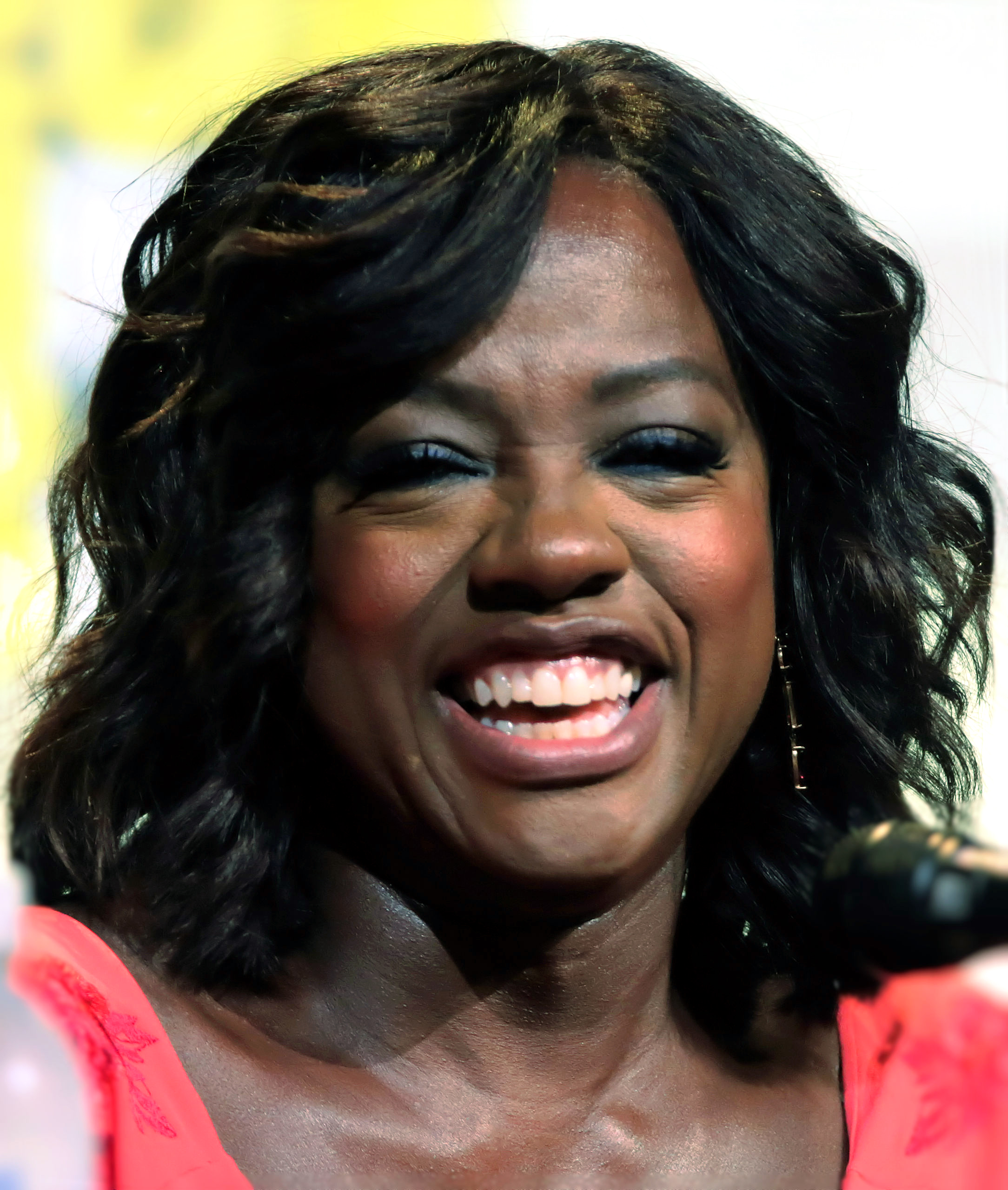
Davis at the 2016 San Diego Comic-Con

Amanda Waller appears in media set in the DC Extended Universe (DCEU) and DC Universe, portrayed by Viola Davis.

- Waller first appears in Suicide Squad. This version is a senior civil servant and the director of A.R.G.U.S. who developed the concept of Task Force X following Superman's death.
- Waller appears in The Suicide Squad.
- Waller makes uncredited cameo appearances in Peacemaker. Additionally, her daughter Leota Adebayo (portrayed by Danielle Brooks) appears as well.
- Waller appears in Black Adam (2022) as an associate of the Justice Society.
- Waller appears in Creature Commandos. Following the first season of Peacemaker and Congress shutting down Task Force X, she forms Task Force M to replace them.

=== Video games ===
- Amanda Waller appears in DC Universe Online, voiced by Debra Cole.
- Amanda Waller appears as a character summon in Scribblenauts Unmasked: A DC Comics Adventure.
- Amanda Waller appears as a downloadable playable character in Lego Batman 3: Beyond Gotham, voiced by Cynthia Addai-Robinson. She is available via "The Squad" DLC.
- Amanda Waller appears in Batman: The Enemy Within, voiced by Debra Wilson. This version is the director of the Agency who seeks the LOTUS virus.
- Amanda Waller appears as a non-player character (NPC) in Lego DC Super-Villains, voiced again by Yvette Nicole Brown.

==== Batman: Arkham ====
Amanda Waller appears in the Batman: Arkham franchise:

- Waller makes a cameo appearance in the post-credits scene of Batman: Arkham Origins, voiced again by CCH Pounder.
- Waller appears in Batman: Arkham Origins Blackgate, voiced again by CCH Pounder.
- Waller appears in Suicide Squad: Kill the Justice League, voiced again by Debra Wilson, who additionally provides facial capture.

=== Web series ===
- The Gods and Monsters incarnation of Amanda Waller appears in the Justice League: Gods and Monsters Chronicles episode "Bomb", voiced again by Penny Johnson Jerald.
- Amanda Waller appears in DC Super Hero Girls and its tie-in films, voiced by Yvette Nicole Brown. This version is the principal of Super Hero High.
- Amanda Waller appears in DC Heroes United, voiced by Veda Howard.

=== Miscellaneous ===
- The Green Lantern film incarnation of Amanda Waller serves as inspiration for a blog written by John Ostrander as part of the Zooniverse project.
- The Justice League Unlimited incarnation of Amanda Waller appears in Batman Beyond.
- The Arrow incarnation of Amanda Waller appears in Arrow: Season 2.5.
- The Arrow incarnation of Amanda Waller appears in The Flash: Season Zero.
- Amanda Waller appears in Injustice 2.
