= Information Technology High School =

Public school in New York City

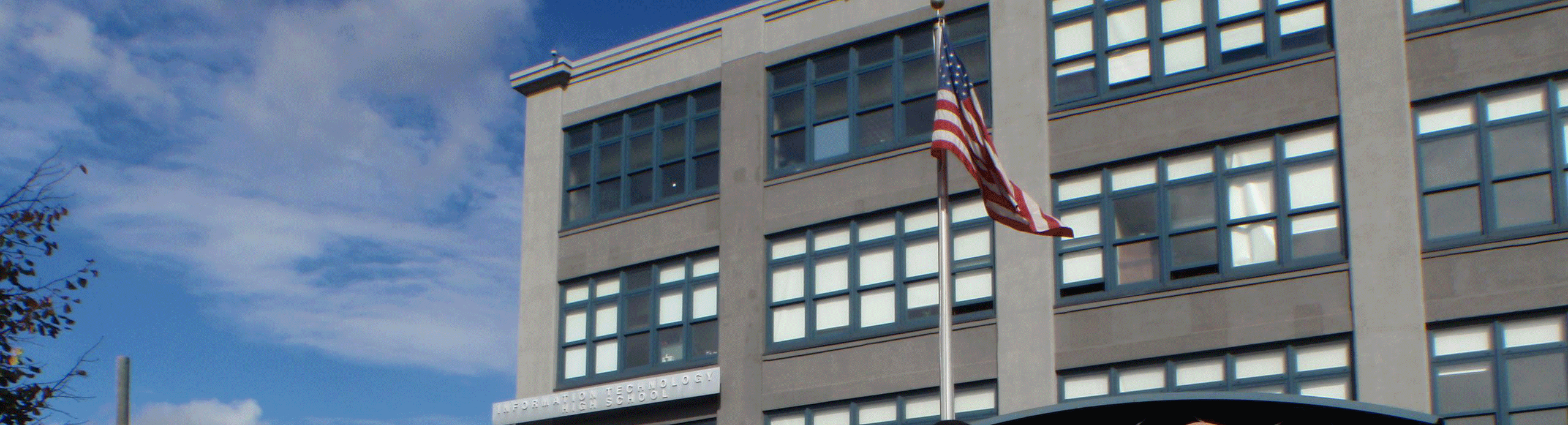

Location
- 21-16 44th Rd; Long Island City, New York 11101; United States
- 40.74831°N 73.94660°W

Information
- Type: Public
- Established: 2003
- School district: New York City Department of Education
- Superintendent: Chris Groll
- NCES School ID: 360010205511
- Principal: Jean Woods-Powell
- Teaching staff: 63.31 (on an FTE basis)
- Grades: 9-12
- Enrollment: 823 (2022–2023)
- Student to teacher ratio: 13.00
- Classes offered: CTE classes in Web Design, Video Production, Apple Macintosh Certified Technician certification classes
- Campus: City: Large
- Colors: Red, Black and White
- Mascot: Blackhawks
- Newspaper: The Blackhawk Online
- Website: infotechhs.net

Information Technology High School is a public secondary school located in Queens, New York. The school is part of the New York City Department of Education school system.

== School building and campus ==
The school building located on 44th Road (in Long Island City) was built on the former site of a metal plating factory and is leased by the New York City Department of Education. The school operates CTE or Career and Technical Education as part of the NYCDOE's revival of CTE Programs in High School.

== History and controversies ==
Information Technology High School opened in 2003 and graduated its first class in 2007. The school has gone through many principals.

The first principal, Jeffrey Levin, was let go after the first school year. Nora Lee Montemerano was then brought in as principal. After her first year, Ms. Montemerano took almost an entire year off because of a medical situation. During that time, (the third year of the school), Assistant Principal Joseph Reed took over as interim principal. Ms. Montemerano returned towards the end of that third year.

Ms. Montemerano served as principal during the schools fourth year, but did not make it through the fifth year. She resigned in April and did not complete the fifth year. Dr. Nancy Casella was brought in as Interim Acting principal to finish the schools fifth year and replace Ms. Montemerano. Dr. Casella was awarded the job as principal for the school's sixth and seventh year. Dr. Casella was relieved of her position about 3 months into the schools eighth year. Ms. Patricia Martin was named the Interim Acting principal upon Dr. Casella's departure. Her term lasted less than two years. Joseph Reed, who has been an Assistant Principal at the school since its second year was named principal for the start of the school year in September 2012, and remains principal. Through Reed, the school has gone through many changes; some negative and some positive.

In 2014, former assistant principal Cedric Hinds was found guilty of organizing an exam cheating scandal to benefit his son.

In 2026, the school was named in a federal lawsuit filed by English teacher Susan Muzafar, who alleged that administrators changed a student's failing Advanced Placement English grade without her knowledge and retaliated against her after she reported the matter to investigators and the College Board. The New York City Department of Education declined to comment, citing pending litigation.

== Sports ==
The school has established many sports programs over the years, including baseball, basketball, bowling, football, fencing, cross country, indoor and outdoor track, wrestling, volleyball, and soccer. However, none were as popular as football and basketball in the earlier years of the school.

=== Basketball ===
The basketball team has had the most success in their playoff runs even though there were multiple coaching changes. Head Coach Jose Ferrer currently holds the longest tenure with the team leading the boys varsity team to the playoffs. They had many successes, but have not won finals yet.

The Girls varsity basketball team has made the playoffs every year under Head Coach Geoffe Serrano. The team's record during the season varies each year, but through it all Playoffs is always an accomplished goal.
