= Chunk (character) =

Publication information
- Publisher: DC Comics
- First appearance: The Flash (vol. 2) #9 (February 1988)
- Created by: Mike Baron (writer); Jackson Guice (artist)

In-story information
- Alter ego: Chester P. Runk
- Team affiliations: Shadow Fighters
- Abilities: Matter transporting Super-strength

Chunk (Chester P. Runk) is a fictional character appearing in comics published by DC Comics. He first appeared in The Flash (vol. 2) #9 (February 1988) and was created by Mike Baron and Jackson Guice.

Chester P. Runk appeared in The Flash starting in the sixth season, portrayed by Brandon McKnight.

== Fictional character biography ==
Chester Runk is a Maverick physicist and engineer who develops a "matter transmitting machine", a primitive long-range teleportation device. Due to a lack of sensible safety procedures, Runk's machine implodes and merges with him, giving him superhuman strength and the ability to teleport and access a pocket dimension called the Void. However, he is forced to constantly absorb matter to remain alive. Chunk battles the Flash, but later reforms and becomes a "waste removal specialist" using his powers. He once rescued Manchester, Alabama, the home of Bart Allen, by drinking all the water that had flooded the town after a dam burst.

In the DC Rebirth relaunch, Chunk has a son, Chester Runk Jr., who is a friend of Ace West. In Titans: Beast World, Chester Runk Jr. is killed by Peacemaker after being mutated by Beast Boy's spores. Additionally, Amanda Waller and Peacemaker recruit Chunk Sr. to destroy Beast Boy, who has transformed into a Starro and threatens Earth. Chunk activates his black hole power, killing himself and Beast Boy.

== Powers and abilities ==
Chunk possesses superhuman strength and durability, and can manipulate local gravimetric fields to draw matter towards him. Furthermore, he can absorb matter and expel it into a pocket dimension called the Void.

== Other versions ==
A possible future variant of Chunk appears in The Flash (vol. 2) Annual #4. This version found work at S.T.A.R. Labs with Tina McGee before he is killed by super-criminals.

== In other media ==
Chester P. Runk appears in The Flash, portrayed by Brandon McKnight. This version is a self-taught, brilliant, and non-overweight yet socially awkward scientist capable of building sophisticated devices out of discarded junk who was inspired by his inventor father Quincy P. Runk (portrayed by Milton Barnes), who died in a car accident in the 1990s. In his first appearance, Chester built a machine capable of opening black holes, only to accidentally create one that fused with his consciousness, leaving him in a catatonic state while the black hole opened in places that held great emotional significance to him. Eventually, the Flash rescues his consciousness from the black hole and places it back into his body, ending the threat. After stabilizing in a special machine built by S.T.A.R. Labs for several weeks, Chester is able to get his life back together as well as join Team Flash, providing assistance via his scientific expertise. Throughout the eighth and ninth seasons, he enters a relationship with Allegra Garcia and eventually discovers the black hole incident turned him into a metahuman with black hole-based powers.
