= Prodigy =

Prodigy, Prodigies or The Prodigy may refer to:

- Child prodigy, a child who produces meaningful output to the level of an adult expert performer
  - Chess prodigy, a child who can beat experienced adult players at chess

== Arts, entertainment, and media ==
=== Fictional characters ===
- Prodigy, a persona of Spider-Man in the Spider-Man: Identity Crisis storyline
- Prodigy (Ritchie Gilmore), a Marvel Comics superhero
- Prodigy (David Alleyne), a Marvel Comics superhero commonly associated with the X-Men
- Franziska von Karma, an Ace Attorney character also known as "The Prodigy"
- In the video game Elden Ring, Miquella and Malenia are known as twin prodigies

=== Film ===
- The Prodigies (film), a 2011 French-British film
- The Prodigy (film), a 2019 American horror thriller film

=== Television ===
- "Prodigy", a 2000 episode of Dark Angel
- "Prodigy", a 2001 episode of Stargate SG-1 (season 4)
- The Prodigy (TV series), a proposed 2007 reality TV show that never aired
- Star Trek: Prodigy (TV series), a 2021 children's science fiction TV series

=== Literature ===
- Prodigy., a 2018 comic book series
- Prodigy (novel), a 2013 novel by Marie Lu
- Beneath the Wheel or The Prodigy, a 1906 novel by Hermann Hesse
- Isaac Asimov's Robot City: Prodigy, a 1988 novel by Arthur Byron Cover
- "The Prodigies", an 1897 short story by Willa Cather

=== Music ===
- Fender Prodigy, an electric guitar produced from 1991 to 1993
- Moog Prodigy, a synthesiser
- The Prodigy, a British electronic music group, named after the Moog Prodigy synthesizer

=== Other uses in arts, entertainment, and media ===
- Prodigy Tactics, a tactical role-playing game
- The Prodigy (newspaper), the University of California, Merced student newspaper
- Prodigy Math Game, 2014 video game

== People ==
- Prodigy (rapper), Albert Johnson (1974–2017), American rapper and member of Mobb Deep
- Prodigy, Craig Crippen, a member of Mindless Behavior
- Tommaso Ciampa (born 1985), ring name Prodigy, American professional wrestler
- B.J. Penn (born 1978), known as The Prodigy, an American mixed martial artist

== Science and technology ==
- Prodigy (online service), an early online service provider
- Ford Prodigy, a low emission vehicle concept car
- HTC Wizard or HTC Prodigy, a smartphone

== Other uses ==
- Prodigy Education, Canadian educational technology company
- Prodigy Finance, a financial company lending to students

== See also ==
- Child star (disambiguation)
- Genius (disambiguation)
- Maestro (disambiguation)
- Savant (disambiguation)
- The Prodigal (disambiguation)
- Virtuoso (disambiguation)
- Wiz (disambiguation)
- Prodigium, an unnatural deviation from the predictable order, in ancient Roman religion
- Prodigium (EP), by Head Phones President
