= List of Absolute Universe characters =

List of characters appearing in the DC Comics' Absolute Universe imprint

This is a list of characters from DC Comics that appear in the Absolute Universe (2024–present).

== Introduced in DC All In (2024–present) ==
Character	First appearance	Notes
Gim Allon Colossal Boy	DC All In Special #1 (October 2024)	A human member of Darkseid's Omega Legion with size-altering powers.
Imra Ardeen Saturn Girl	DC All In Special #1 (October 2024)	A Titanian member of the Omega Legion with telepathic powers.
Jan Arrah Element Lad	DC All In Special #1 (October 2024)	A Trommite member of the Omega Legion with elemental powers.
Jazmin Cullen Kid Quantum	DC All In Special #1 (October 2024)	A Xanthuan member of the Omega Legion with the ability to create stasis fields.
Reep Daggle Chameleon Boy	DC All In Special #1 (October 2024)	A Durlan member of the Omega Legion with shapeshifting powers.
Diana of the Wild Isle Wonder Woman	DC All In Special #1 (October 2024)	The princess of Themyscira, considered the last Amazon. Taken from Themyscira as a baby, Diana was raised on the Wild Isle of Hell by the exiled witch Circe. Upon reaching adulthood, however, she arrives in Gateway City ready to defend Earth and search for her missing Amazon sisters.
Salu Digby Shrinking Violet	DC All In Special #1 (October 2024)	An Imskian member of the Omega Legion with the ability to shrink.
Querl Dox Brainiac 5	DC All In Special #1 (October 2024)	A Coluan member of the Omega Legion who is a highly intelligent android.
Luornu Durgo Triplicate Girl	DC All In Special #1 (October 2024)	A Carggite member of the Omega Legion with the ability to split into three identical versions of herself.
Kal-El / Clark Kent Superman	DC All In Special #1 (October 2024)	A survivor from the destroyed planet Krypton who lives on Earth, where he possesses a variety of superpowers due to exposure to solar radiation.
Thom Kallor Star Boy	DC All In Special #1 (October 2024)	A Xanthuan member of the Omega Legion capable of manipulating his own density and that of objects.
Rokk Krinn Cosmic Boy	DC All In Special #1 (October 2024)	A Braalian member of the Omega Legion who can generate and control magnetic fields.
Brin Londo Timber Wolf	DC All In Special #1 (October 2024)	A Zuunian member of the Omega Legion with wolf-like features.
Tasmia Mallor Shadow Lass	DC All In Special #1 (October 2024)	A Talokian member of the Omega Legion capable of manipulating shadows.
Jo Nah Ultra Boy	DC All In Special #1 (October 2024)	A superpowered human member of the Omega Legion.
Andrew Nolan Ferro Lad	DC All In Special #1 (October 2024)	A human member of the Omega Legion with the ability to transform his body into organic steel.
Pegasus	DC All In Special #1 (October 2024)	Wonder Woman's skeletal, winged steed.
Garth Ranzz Lightning Lad	DC All In Special #1 (October 2024)	A Winathian member of the Omega Legion with electrical powers.
Bruce Wayne Batman	DC All In Special #1 (October 2024)	A middle-class civil engineer in Gotham City who moonlights as a masked vigilante, vowing vengeance against the criminal underworld after witnessing the murder of his father, Thomas Wayne, as a child.
Tinya Wazzo Phantom Girl	DC All In Special #1 (October 2024)	A Bgztlian member of the Omega Legion who can become intangible.
Dirk Morgna Sun Boy	Justice League Unlimited vol. 2 #10 (August 2025)	A human member of the Omega Legion with pyrokinetic powers.
Val Armorr Karate Kid	Superman vol. 6 #30 (November 2025)	A human member of the Omega Legion who is a martial artist.
Jenni Ognats XS	The Flash vol. 6 #27 (December 2025)	A human speedster member of the Omega Legion.
Nura Nal Dream Girl	The Flash vol. 6 #29 (January 2026)	A Naltorian member of the Omega Legion with precognitive abilities.

== Introduced in Absolute Batman (2024–present) ==
Character	First appearance	Notes
Harvey Bullock	Absolute Batman #1 (October 2024)	The police commissioner of the Gotham City Police Department (GCPD).
Joe Chill	Absolute Batman #1 (October 2024)	A mass shooter who murdered Thomas Wayne at Gotham's zoo.
Barbara Gordon	Absolute Batman #1 (October 2024)	The daughter of Jim Gordon and a GCPD officer the same age as Bruce.
Jim Gordon	Absolute Batman #1 (October 2024)	A former GCPD officer who served as mayor of Gotham City before being succeeded by Hamilton Hill.
Jack Grimm The Joker	Absolute Batman #1 (October 2024)	A centuries-old immortal billionaire who takes on a demonic form. He first established his persona in 1888 as a Gotham street performer who became a wealthy philanthropist and founder of the entertainment conglomerate Just Kidding, the Grimm family secretly manipulating industries and governments for profit, becoming a global criminal power, the "family" a façade for one single immortal: Jack Grimm.
Waylon "Way" Jones Killer Croc	Absolute Batman #1 (October 2024)	The childhood friend of Bruce Wayne, who is mutated into a giant crocodile at the offshore black-site facility Ark M, funded by Hamilton Hill.
Alfred Pennyworth	Absolute Batman #1 (October 2024)	An MI6 agent who is sent to Gotham City to investigate the Party Animals gang and ends up becoming an ally of Batman.
Roman Sionis Black Mask	Absolute Batman #1 (October 2024)	A terrorist and leader of a gang known as Party Animals.
Martha Wayne	Absolute Batman #1 (October 2024)	Bruce Wayne's mother and a social worker, as well as Jim Gordon's deputy mayor during his term.
Thomas Wayne	Absolute Batman #1 (October 2024)	Bruce Wayne's father and an elementary school teacher who was killed by Joe Chill during a field trip to the zoo.
Oswald Cobblepot Penguin	Absolute Batman #1 (October 2024; cameo appearance); Absolute Batman #2 (November 2024; full appearance)	A childhood friend of Bruce, Oswald works on the black market, becoming Batman's ally. He is left deformed after Bane breaks every bone in his body, relying on crutches that double as machine guns.
Harvey Dent Two-Face	Absolute Batman #1 (October 2024; cameo appearance); Absolute Batman #2 (November 2024; full appearance)	Another childhood friend of Bruce, who works in the District Attorney's office. He develops a split personality when Bane burns half his face and splits his skull and brain open, murdering criminals.
Selina Kyle Catwoman	Absolute Batman #1 (October 2024; cameo appearance); Absolute Batman #2 (November 2024; full appearance)	The protagonist of Absolute Catwoman. A childhood friend a lover of Bruce, who became an international thief and mercenary.
Edward Nygma Riddler	Absolute Batman #1 (October 2024; cameo appearance); Absolute Batman #2 (November 2024; full appearance)	An intelligent childhood friend of Bruce, becoming Batman's ally. He becomes a cyborg after Bane damages his frontal lobe, merging with his Riddler AI.
Julia Pennyworth	Absolute Batman #1 (October 2024; cameo appearance); Absolute Batman #3 (December 2024; full appearance)	Alfred's estranged daughter.
Bibbo Bibbowski	Absolute Batman #3 (December 2024)	A boxer working for the mafia, with whom Waylon Jones had previously fought. He is killed by Black Mask during a brutal training session.
Hamilton Hill	Absolute Batman #3 (December 2024)	A politician who succeeds Jim Gordon as mayor of Gotham City.
Leslie Thompkins	Absolute Batman #5 (February 2025)	
Nora Fries	Absolute Batman #7 (April 2025)	
Victor Fries Jr. Mr. Freeze	Absolute Batman #7 (April 2025)	
Victor Fries Sr.	Absolute Batman #7 (April 2025)	
Mitchell "Matches" Malone	Absolute Batman #7 (April 2025)	
Bane	Absolute Batman #9 (June 2025)	
Dick Grayson Robin	Absolute Batman #9 (June 2025)	An emergency medical technician (EMT) who dislikes Batman.
Harley Quinn	Absolute Batman #13 (October 2025)	The leader of the Red Hood gang.
Harvey Harris	Absolute Batman #15 (December 2025)	A long-presumed-dead FBI agent and associate of Alfred, who investigated the Joker in the 1990s. Reportedly killed in a boating accident, Harris, in reality, had his death faked by the Joker, who kept him alive for 30 years as a castaway on a private island he owned before killing Harris for real.
Akrolis	Absolute Batman #16 (January 2026)	A centaur.
Lucius Fox	Absolute Batman #16 (January 2026)	A foreman and Bruce's boss.
Pamela Isley Poison Ivy	Absolute Batman #17 (February 2026)	
Stephanie Brown Robin	Absolute Batman #19 (April 2026)	
Jonathan Crane Scarecrow	Absolute Batman #19 (April 2026)	A scientist who works for the Joker, described as one of the "most terrifying doctors" at Ark M.
Tim Drake Robin	Absolute Batman #19 (April 2026)	
Duke Thomas Robin	Absolute Batman #19 (April 2026)	
Jason Todd Robin	Absolute Batman #19 (April 2026)	
Clayface	Absolute Batman #21 (June 2026)	
Calendar Man	Absolute Batman #22 (July 2026)	
Tweedledum and Tweedledee	Absolute Batman #22 (July 2026)	

== Introduced in Absolute Wonder Woman (2024–present) ==
Character	First appearance	Notes
Apollo	Absolute Wonder Woman #1 (October 2024)	The Greek god of the sun.
Circe	Absolute Wonder Woman #1 (October 2024)	
Harbinger Prime	Absolute Wonder Woman #1 (October 2024)	
Tetracide	Absolute Wonder Woman #2 (November 2024)	
Steve Trevor	Absolute Wonder Woman #2 (November 2024)	
Barbara Minerva	Absolute Wonder Woman #3 (December 2024)	An archaeologist who works at the Gateway Museum and has knowledge about the Amazons.
Veronica Cale	Absolute Wonder Woman #4 (January 2025)	The National Security Advisor of the United States and director of Area 41.
Etta Candy	Absolute Wonder Woman #4 (January 2025)	
Gia Candy	Absolute Wonder Woman #4 (January 2025)	
Hecate	Absolute Wonder Woman #4 (January 2025)	The Greek goddess of magic.
Hades	Absolute Wonder Woman #6 (March 2025)	The Greek god of the underworld.
Prometheus	Absolute Wonder Woman #6 (March 2025)	A Titan who stole fire from the gods to give it to humans, and was punished by being chained to a mountain in the underworld.
Chimera	Absolute Wonder Woman #7 (April 2025)	A creature from the underworld.
Persephone	Absolute Wonder Woman #7 (April 2025)	The Greek goddess of spring, wife of Hades and queen of the underworld.
Doctor Poison	Absolute Wonder Woman #8 (May 2025)	A scientist working directly under Cale at Area 41, whose body is composed of poison gas, requiring a special World War II-era suit to contain her. She later becomes a member of the Suicide Squad, a team founded by Cale to destroy Wonder Woman.
Ferdinand	Absolute Wonder Woman #9 (June 2025)	
Petra	Absolute Wonder Woman #9 (June 2025)	
Queen Clea	Absolute Wonder Woman #9 (June 2025)	
Artemis	Absolute Wonder Woman #10 (July 2025)	The Greek goddess of the hunt.
Io	Absolute Wonder Woman #10 (July 2025)	
Hippolyta	Absolute Wonder Woman #12 (September 2025)	The mother of Wonder Woman and queen of the Amazons of Themyscira.
Zatanna Zatara	Absolute Wonder Woman #12 (September 2025)	A powerful sorceress imprisoned in Area 41. She becomes a member of the Suicide Squad.
Doris Zuel Giganta	Absolute Wonder Woman #12 (September 2025; cameo appearance); Absolute Wonder Woman #16 (January 2026; full appearance)	An Area 41 prisoner with size-altering powers. She becomes a member of the Suicide Squad.
Gaia	Absolute Wonder Woman #14 (November 2025)	The personification of the Earth.
Aphrodite	Absolute Wonder Woman #16 (January 2026)	The Greek goddess of love.
Ara the Fish-Men Queen	Absolute Wonder Woman #16 (January 2026)	The amphibious queen of the race of Fish-Men that Queen Clea enslaved. She becomes a member of the Suicide Squad.
Priscilla Rich Cheetah	Absolute Wonder Woman #16 (January 2026)	A member of the Suicide Squad.
Crimson Centipede	Absolute Wonder Woman Annual (February 2026)	
Medusa	Absolute Wonder Woman Annual (February 2026)	
Stheno and Euryale	Absolute Wonder Woman Annual (February 2026)	Medusa's sisters.
Giovanni Zatara	Absolute Wonder Woman #17 (February 2026)	Zatanna's sorcerer father, who has the appearance of a flaming skeleton.
Iron Maiden	Absolute Wonder Woman #19 (April 2026)	
Ares	Absolute Wonder Woman #23 (August 2026)	
Isadore Cale	Absolute Wonder Woman #23 (August 2026)	
Zeus	Absolute Wonder Woman #23 (August 2026)	

== Introduced in Absolute Superman (2024–present) ==
Character	First appearance	Notes
Jor-El	Absolute Superman #1 (November 2024)	
Krypto	Absolute Superman #1 (November 2024)	Kal-El's pet dog on Krypton.
Lois Lane	Absolute Superman #1 (November 2024)	
Lara-El	Absolute Superman #1 (November 2024)	
Brainiac	Absolute Superman #1 (November 2024; cameo appearance); Absolute Superman #7 (May 2025; full appearance)	
Christopher Smith	Absolute Superman #2 (December 2025)	
Martha Kent	Absolute Superman #3 (January 2025)	
Talia al Ghul Omega Prime / Primus	Absolute Superman #4 (February 2025)	
Sam Lane	Absolute Superman #4 (February 2025)	
Jimmy Olsen	Absolute Superman #4 (February 2025)	
Ra's al Ghul	Absolute Superman #6 (April 2025)	
Jonathan Kent	Absolute Superman #6 (April 2025)	
Lana Lang	Absolute Superman #12 (October 2025)	A waitress at a diner in Smallville.
Winslow Schott Toyman	Absolute Superman #15 (January 2026)	
Alex Luthor	Absolute Superman #16 (February 2026)	
Lena Luthor	Absolute Superman #16 (February 2026)	
Parasite	Absolute Superman #16 (February 2026)	
Perry White	Absolute Superman #16 (February 2026)	The former metro desk editor of the Daily Planet.
John Henry Irons Steel	Absolute Superman #18 (April 2026)	
Phantom Stranger	Absolute Superman #18 (April 2026)	A hooded seer who foretold the arrival of Superman more than 3000 years ago, during Ancient Egypt.
Teth-Adam King Shazam	Absolute Superman #18 (April 2026)	
Doomsdays	Absolute Superman #21 (July 2026)	
Metallo	Absolute Superman #22 (August 2026)	
Bloodsport	Absolute Superman #24 (October 2026)	
Chemo	Absolute Superman #24 (October 2026)	
Albert Michaels Atomic Skull	Absolute Superman #24 (October 2026)	

== Introduced in Absolute Flash (2025–present) ==
Character	First appearance	Notes
Barry Allen	Absolute Flash #1 (March 2025)	A "Project Olympus" scientist accidentally killed by Wally on getting his powers.
Grodd	Absolute Flash #1 (March 2025)	A green monkey with an exposed brain who developed telepathic powers after being subjected to experiments at Fort Fox.
George "Digger" Harkness Captain Boomerang	Absolute Flash #1 (March 2025)	
Jesse James Trickster	Absolute Flash #1 (March 2025)	
Sam Scudder Mirror Master	Absolute Flash #1 (March 2025)	
Leonard Snart Captain Cold	Absolute Flash #1 (March 2025)	
Lisa Snart Glider	Absolute Flash #1 (March 2025)	
Rudy West	Absolute Flash #1 (March 2025)	
Wally West The Flash	Absolute Flash #1 (March 2025)	
Mary West	Absolute Flash #2 (April 2025; cameo appearance)	Wally West's deceased mother.
Elenore Thawne	Absolute Flash #3 (May 2025)	
Ralph Dibny	Absolute Flash #4 (June 2025)	An Iron Heights citizen who runs a youth center with his wife Sue.
Linda Park	Absolute Flash #4 (June 2025)	
Mick Rory Heat Wave	Absolute Flash #4 (June 2025)	
Jay Garrick	Absolute Flash #6 (August 2025)	A military captain that worked at Fort Fox with Eobard Thawne.
Eobard Thawne	Absolute Flash #6 (August 2025)	The head of a secret government research project called Blue Trinity who attempted to make contact with a dimension of pure energy, driven mad by a voice he heard calling to him from the dimension, before disappearing into it with army officer Jay Garrick.
Mark Mardon Weather Wizard	Absolute Flash #7 (September 2025)	
Flish	Absolute Flash #10 (December 2025)	
Naalak	Absolute Flash #10 (December 2025)	
Black Flash	Absolute Flash #15 (May 2026)	
Rick Flag Jr.	Absolute Flash #15 (May 2026)	
Ray Palmer	Absolute Flash #15 (May 2026)	
Silas Stone	Absolute Flash #15 (May 2026)	
Abra Kadabra	Absolute Flash #18 (August 2026)	
Director Bones	Absolute Flash #18 (August 2026)	
Sue Dibny	Absolute Flash #18 (August 2026)	
Hunter Zolomon	Absolute Flash #18 (August 2026)	
Vic Stone Cyborg	Absolute Flash #20 (October 2026)	
Firestorm	Absolute Flash #22 (December 2026)	

== Introduced in Absolute Martian Manhunter (2025–2026) ==
Character	First appearance	Notes
Bridget Jones	Absolute Martian Manhunter #1 (March 2025)	John's wife.
John Jones	Absolute Martian Manhunter #1 (March 2025)	A FBI agent.
Tyler Jones	Absolute Martian Manhunter #1 (March 2025)	John's son.
Martian	Absolute Martian Manhunter #1 (March 2025)	An otherworldly consciousness who conceptualises itself in John's head with the familiar imagery of a green alien from Mars.
Mike Miller Human Flame	Absolute Martian Manhunter #1 (March 2025)	
Trigger Taylor	Absolute Martian Manhunter #2 (April 2025)	
White Martian	Absolute Martian Manhunter #2 (April 2025)	
Despair-the-Zero	Absolute Martian Manhunter #8 (January 2026)	An alien entity that personifies despair.
Lawrence Trapp	Absolute Martian Manhunter #9 (February 2026)	A therapist whom John and Bridget consult in an attempt to save their troubled marriage.
Uncle Sam	Absolute Martian Manhunter #12 (July 2026)	

== Introduced in Absolute Green Lantern (2025–present) ==
Character	First appearance	Notes
Hal Jordan Black Hand	Absolute Green Lantern #1 (April 2025)	
Jo Mullein Green Lantern	Absolute Green Lantern #1 (April 2025)	
John Stewart	Absolute Green Lantern #1 (April 2025)	
Abin Sur	Absolute Green Lantern #1 (April 2025)	
Guy Gardner	Absolute Green Lantern #2 (May 2025)	
Todd Rice Obsidian	Absolute Green Lantern #3 (June 2025)	
Carol Ferris	Absolute Green Lantern #4 (July 2025)	
Hector Hammond	Absolute Green Lantern #4 (July 2025)	
Tomar Re	Absolute Green Lantern #4 (July 2025)	
Simon Baz	Absolute Green Lantern #6 (September 2025)	
Cameron Chase	Absolute Green Lantern #6 (September 2025)	
Jonny Double	Absolute Green Lantern #6 (September 2025)	
Mogo	Absolute Green Lantern #6 (September 2025)	
Controller of Mu Sin Es Tro	Absolute Green Lantern #7 (October 2025)	
Kilowog	Absolute Green Lantern #7 (October 2025)	
Medphyll	Absolute Green Lantern #7 (October 2025)	
Arisia Rrab	Absolute Green Lantern #7 (October 2025)	
Qurina Vint	Absolute Green Lantern #7 (October 2025)	
Galius Zed	Absolute Green Lantern #7 (October 2025)	
Bill Hand	Absolute Green Lantern #8 (November 2025)	
Renee Montoya	Absolute Green Lantern #8 (November 2025)	
Steve Dayton	Absolute Green Lantern #9 (December 2025)	
Keith Kenyon Nemesis / Goldface	Absolute Green Lantern #9 (December 2025)	
Kari Limbo	Absolute Green Lantern #9 (December 2025)	
Terry Long	Absolute Green Lantern #9 (December 2025)	
Alanna	Absolute Green Lantern #13 (April 2026)	
Emily Hawke Agent Zero	Absolute Green Lantern #13 (April 2026)	
Sardath	Absolute Green Lantern #13 (April 2026)	
Rac Shade	Absolute Green Lantern #13 (April 2026)	
Salakk	Absolute Green Lantern #14 (May 2026)	
Katma Tui	Absolute Green Lantern #14 (May 2026)	
Jessica Cruz	Absolute Green Lantern #16 (July 2026)	
Baron Blitzkrieg	Absolute Green Lantern #18 (August 2026)	
Will Everett	Absolute Green Lantern #19 (October 2026)	
Paul Kirk Control	Absolute Green Lantern #19 (October 2026)	
Chase Lawler	Absolute Green Lantern #19 (October 2026)	
Donald "Falcon" Richards	Absolute Green Lantern #19 (October 2026)	
Mark Shaw	Absolute Green Lantern #19 (October 2026)	
Katherine "Red Kate" Spencer	Absolute Green Lantern #19 (October 2026)	
Amanda Waller	Absolute Green Lantern #19 (October 2026)	

== Introduced in Absolute Green Arrow (2026–present) ==
Character	First appearance	Notes
Brittany Brandon	Absolute Green Arrow #1 (May 2026)	
Annie Green	Absolute Green Arrow #1 (May 2026)	
Dinah Lance Black Canary	Absolute Green Arrow #1 (May 2026)	An executive protection specialist assigned to uncover the identity of the serial killer Green Arrow.
Connor Hawke Green Arrow	Absolute Green Arrow #1 (May 2026)	The estranged son of Oliver Queen and a serial killer wielding a bow and arrow who targets corrupt, wealthy individuals.
Arthur King / Malcolm Merlyn Green Arrow	Absolute Green Arrow #1 (May 2026)	
Jubal Slade	Absolute Green Arrow #1 (May 2026)	
Reese Tyler	Absolute Green Arrow #1 (May 2026)	
Mia Dearden	Absolute Green Arrow #1 (May 2026; cameo appearance); Absolute Green Arrow #2 (June 2026; full appearance)	
Roy Harper	Absolute Green Arrow #1 (May 2026; cameo appearance); Absolute Green Arrow #2 (June 2026; full appearance)	
Tom Hallaway	Absolute Green Arrow #1 (May 2026; cameo appearance); Absolute Green Arrow #4 (August 2026; full appearance)	
Edvin Zytle	Absolute Green Arrow #2 (June 2026)	
Solomon Grundy	Absolute Green Arrow #3 (July 2026)	

== Introduced in Absolute Catwoman (2026–present) ==
Character	First appearance	Notes
Cassandra Cain	Absolute Catwoman #1 (June 2026)	
Dante Calderone	Absolute Catwoman #1 (June 2026)	
Holly Robinson	Absolute Catwoman #1 (June 2026)	
Helena Bertinelli	Absolute Catwoman #2 (July 2026)	
Vic Sage	Absolute Catwoman #2 (July 2026)	
Sandra Wu-San Lady Shiva	Absolute Catwoman #2 (July 2026)	

== Introduced in other Absolute Universe comics ==
Character	First appearance	Notes
Wesley Dodds Sandman	Absolute Evil (October 2025)	A chemist who operated as a masked vigilante in the 1930s.
Ted Grant Wildcat	Absolute Evil (October 2025)	A 20th-century vigilante from Gotham City who was bribed into retirement and subsequently used the money to open his own gym.
Carter Hall Hawkman	Absolute Evil (October 2025)	A former superhero turned government assassin who kills anyone who might disrupt the status quo on orders from the Justice League.
Dora Luthor	Absolute Evil (October 2025)	Lex Luthor's wife.
Lex Luthor	Absolute Evil (October 2025)	The owner of a gas station in Missouri.
Iron Munro	Absolute Evil (October 2025)	A vigilante and socialist who operated briefly during the 1950s.
Oliver Queen	Absolute Evil (October 2025)	A skilled archer and acquaintance of Hector Hammond. He was murdered by Hawkman for investigating Jubal Slade's affairs.
Amadeus Arkham	Absolute Batman: Ark M Special (January 2026)	The founder of Arkham Asylum.
Elizabeth Arkham	Absolute Batman: Ark M Special (January 2026)	Amadeus Arkham's mother, who killed almost all of her children except Amadeus, before committing suicide upon learning of her husband's death.
Slade Wilson Deathstroke	Absolute Batman: Ark M Special (January 2026)	A mercenary and former MI6 agent who works for the Joker.
David Cain	Absolute Cassandra Cain: The Shadow's Hand (September 2026)	
Scandal Savage	Absolute Cassandra Cain: The Shadow's Hand (September 2026)	
Michael Sommers	Absolute Cassandra Cain: The Shadow's Hand (September 2026)	
Ben Turner	Absolute Cassandra Cain: The Shadow's Hand (September 2026)	
Tatsu Yamashiro	Absolute Cassandra Cain: The Shadow's Hand (September 2026)	
Professor Pyg	Absolute Batman: Beyond Ark M	
