= List of Suicide Squad members =

DC Comics' Suicide Squad's roster has always been one of reformed or incarcerated felons promised commuted sentences in return for participation in high-risk missions. The Squad's lineup has changed many times over the years, since its creation in 1959, and this list groups membership by the team's various eras and incarnations. Bolded names indicate current Suicide Squad members.

First appearance is the issue where the character first appeared as a member of a particular Suicide Squad incarnation. It is not necessarily the first appearance of the character in print, nor the story depicting how the character joined the Squad. The Squad was made up by five members.

== World War II Era ==
(Star Spangled War Stories #110-111)

- Skipper Allan
- The Professor

(Star Spangled War Stories #116-118, 120)

- Vic Morgan
- Andy (Barry) Mace
- Baby Dino (first appears in #117)
- Caveboy (first appears in #120)

(Star Spangled War Stories #119)

- Wild One
- The Sheriff

(Star Spangled War Stories #121)

- Stoner
- Manny

(Star Spangled War Stories #125)

- Sgt. Trask
- Reed
- Mac the Second

(Star Spangled War Stories #127)

- Woods
- Hale
- Green
- Fitz
- Kenny
- Talbot
- Peters
- Kent
- Frobish

(Star Spangled War Stories #128)

- Arnie Brock
- Tom Granger

== The Silver Age Suicide Squad (1959–1987) ==
| Character | Real name | First appearance | Notes |
|---|---|---|---|
| Rick Flag | Anthony Miller | The Brave and the Bold #25 | |
| Jess Bright | | The Brave and the Bold #25 | |
| Dr. Hugh Evans | | The Brave and the Bold #25 | |
| Karin Grace | | The Brave and the Bold #25 | |

== Suicide Squad (vol. 1) (1987–1992) ==
| Character | Real name | First appearance | Notes |
|---|---|---|---|
| Amanda Waller | | Legends #2 | |
| Deadshot | Floyd Lawton | Legends #2 | |
| Rick Flag | Anthony Miller | Legends #2 | |
| Bronze Tiger | Benjamin "Ben" Turner | Legends #2 | |
| Enchantress | June Moone | Legends #3 | |
| Captain Boomerang | George "Digger" Harkness | Legends #3 | |
| Blockbuster | Mark Desmond | Legends #3 | Dies in the fight against Brimstone |
| Briscoe | | Suicide Squad #1 (May 1987) | Died |
| Karin Grace | | Suicide Squad #1 (May 1987) | Died |
| Mindboggler | Leah Wasserman | Suicide Squad #1 (May 1987) | Died |
| Nemesis | Tom Tresser | Suicide Squad #1 (May 1987) | |
| Nightshade | Eve Eden | Suicide Squad #1 (May 1987) | |
| Plastique | Bette Sans Souci | Suicide Squad #1 (May 1987) | |
| Black Orchid | Susan Linden | Suicide Squad #4 (August 1987) | |
| Chronos | David Clinton | Suicide Squad #4 (August 1987) | Was only seen as a member of the team in issue 4 |
| Penguin | Oswald Chesterfield Cobblepot | Suicide Squad #5 (September 1987) | |
| Killer Frost | Louise Lincoln | Firestorm (vol. 2) #64 (October 1987) | |
| Multiplex | Danton Black | Firestorm (vol. 2) #64 (October 1987) | Was presumably killed by Parasite when the team was sent after Firestorm. Though, he later appeared once again without any explanation. |
| Slipknot | Christopher Weiss | Firestorm (vol. 2) #64 (October 1987) | Died |
| Parasite | Rudy Jones | Firestorm (vol. 2) #64 (October 1987) | |
| Manhunter/Privateer | Mark Shaw | Suicide Squad #8 (December 1987) | |
| Duchess | Lashina | Suicide Squad #9 (January 1988) | Was evaporated by Darkseid's Omega Beams when the team went to Apokolips. |
| Speedy | Roy Harper | Suicide Squad #11 (March 1988) | |
| Vixen | Mari Jiwe McCabe | Suicide Squad #11 (March 1988) | |
| Mister 104 | John Dubrovny | Doom Patrol and Suicide Squad Special #1 (March 1988) | Died |
| Thinker | Clifford DeVoe | Doom Patrol and Suicide Squad Special #1 (March 1988) | Died |
| Weasel | John Monroe | Doom Patrol and Suicide Squad Special #1 (March 1988) | Died |
| Psi | Gayle Marsh | Doom Patrol and Suicide Squad Special #1 (March 1988) | Died |
| Javelin | Unknown | Suicide Squad #13 (May 1988) | Killed during War of The Gods |
| Captain Cold | Leonard Snart | Suicide Squad #16 (September 1988) | |
| Shade, the Changing Man | Rac Shade | Suicide Squad #16 (September 1988) | |
| Oracle | Barbara Gordon | Suicide Squad #23 (April 1989) | |
| Count Vertigo | Werner Vertigo | Suicide Squad #24 (May 1989) | |
| Doctor Light | Arthur Light | Suicide Squad #24 (May 1989) | Died |
| Jewelee | Unknown | Suicide Squad #24 (May 1989) | |
| Shrike | Vanessa Kingsbury | Suicide Squad #24 (May 1989) | Died |
| Punch | Clyde Phillips | Suicide Squad #24 (May 1989) | |
| Ravan | N/A | Suicide Squad #24 (May 1989) | |
| Lady Liberty | Unknown | Checkmate #18 (June 1989) | |
| Silent Majority | Unknown | Checkmate #18 (June 1989) | |
| Major Victory | William Vickers | Suicide Squad #30 | |
| Poison Ivy | Pamela Isley | Suicide Squad #33 | |
| Atom | Adam Cray | Suicide Squad #44 | Died |
| Thinker | Cliff Carmichael | Suicide Squad #51 | |
| Stalnoivolk | Ivan Illyich Gort | Suicide Squad #53 | |
| Black Adam | Teth-Adam | Suicide Squad #58 | |
| Catalyst | Unknown | Suicide Squad #58 | |
| Enforcer | Mica Love | Suicide Squad #58 | Died |
| Firehawk | Lorraine Reilly | Suicide Squad #58 | |
| Maser | Harold Lawrence Jordan | Suicide Squad #58 | |
| Karma | Wayne Hawkins | Suicide Squad #58 | Died |
| Outlaw | John Henry Martin | Suicide Squad #58 | |
| Silver Swan | Valerie Beaudry | Suicide Squad #58 | |
| Sportsmaster | Victor Gover | Suicide Squad #58 | |
| The Writer | Grant Morrison | Suicide Squad #58 | Died |

== Interim Suicide Squad (1992–2001) ==
| Character | Real name | First appearance | Notes |
|---|---|---|---|
| Amanda Waller | | Superboy (vol. 4) #13 (March 1995) | |
| Captain Boomerang | George "Digger" Harkness | Superboy (vol. 4) #13 (March 1995) | |
| Deadshot | Floyd Lawton | Superboy (vol. 4) #13 (March 1995) | |
| King Shark | Nanaue | Superboy (vol. 4) #13 (March 1995) | |
| Knockout | Unknown | Superboy (vol. 4) #13 (March 1995) | |
| Sam Makoa | | Superboy (vol. 4) #13 (March 1995) | |
| Sidearm | Unknown | Superboy (vol. 4) #13 (March 1995) | Killed by King Shark. |
| Superboy | Conner Kent/Kon-El | Superboy (vol. 4) #13 (March 1995) | |
| Quartzite | Unknown | Hawk & Dove (vol. 4) #3 (January 1998) | |
| Shrapnel | Mark Scheffer | Hawk & Dove (vol. 4) #3 (January 1998) | |
| Bronze Tiger | Benjamin "Ben" Turner | Hawk & Dove (vol. 4) #3 (January 1998) | |
| Count Vertigo | Werner Vertigo | Hawk & Dove (vol. 4) #3 (January 1998) | |
| Thermal | Unknown | Hawk & Dove (vol. 4) #4 (February 1998) | |
| Flex | Unknown | Hawk & Dove (vol. 4) #4 (February 1998) | |
| Bolt | Larry Bolatinsky | Chase #2 (March 1998) | |
| Cameron Chase | Unknown | Chase #2 (March 1998) | |
| Copperhead | "John Doe" | Chase #2 (March 1998) | |
| Killer Frost | Louise Lincoln | Chase #2 (March 1998) | |
| Sledge | Unknown | Chase #2 (March 1998) | |
| Plasmus | Otto Von Furth | Superman: Our Worlds at War Secret Files & Origins (August 2001) | |
| Manchester Black | | The Adventures of Superman #593 (August 2001) | Left the team in The Adventures of Superman #594 |
| Chemo | | The Adventures of Superman #593 (August 2001) | |
| Steel | John Henry Irons | The Adventures of Superman #594 (September 2001) | |
| Mongul | | The Adventures of Superman #594 (September 2001) | |

== Suicide Squad (vol. 2) (2001–2002) ==
| Character | Real name | First appearance | Notes |
|---|---|---|---|
| Sgt. Frank Rock | | Suicide Squad (vol. 2) #1 | |
| Big Sir | Dufus P. Ratchet | Suicide Squad (vol. 2) #1 | Dies; blown up in the first issue. |
| Bulldozer | Horace Nichols | Suicide Squad (vol. 2) #1 | |
| Clock King | William Tockman | Suicide Squad (vol. 2) #1 | Dies; killed by a clone army in the first issue. |
| Cluemaster | Arthur Brown | Suicide Squad (vol. 2) #1 | Apparently dies in the first issue upon being killed by a clone army, but was revealed to be alive on issue #9. |
| Major Disaster | Paul Booker | Suicide Squad (vol. 2) #1 | |
| Multi-Man | Duncan Pramble | Suicide Squad (vol. 2) #1 | Dies; killed by a clone army in the first issue. Due to the ability to be reborn, he returned to life on Joker: Last Laugh. |
| Amanda Waller | | Suicide Squad (vol. 2) #2 | |
| Havana | Odalys Milagro Valdez | Suicide Squad (vol. 2) #2 | Dies; killed by Rustam. |
| Modem | Wesley Percival Sloan | Suicide Squad (vol. 2) #2 | Dies; killed by the Djinn. |
| Bolt | Larry Bolatinsky | Suicide Squad (vol. 2) #3 | Is blown up whilst fighting a hive of sentient ants |
| Larvanaut | Unknown | Suicide Squad (vol. 2) #3 | Killed by ants. |
| Eliza | N/A | Suicide Squad (vol. 2) #3 | Killed by ants. |
| Killer Frost | Louise Lincoln | Suicide Squad (vol. 2) #3 | |
| Putty | Unknown | Suicide Squad (vol. 2) #3 | Killed by ants. |
| Deadshot | Floyd Lawton | Suicide Squad (vol. 2) #5 | |
| Blackstarr | Rachel Berkowitz | Suicide Squad (vol. 2) #6 | |
| Reactron | Ben Krullen | Suicide Squad (vol. 2) #6 | Accidentally killed by Killer Frost. |
| Solomon Grundy | Cyrus Gold | Superman (vol. 2) #182 | |
| Hawkman | Carter Hall | Suicide Squad (vol. 2) #12 | |
| Power Girl | Karen Starr | Suicide Squad (vol. 2) #12 | |
| Star-Spangled Kid | Courtney Whitmore | Suicide Squad (vol. 2) #12 | |
| Wildcat | Ted Grant | Suicide Squad (vol. 2) #12 | |

== Interim Suicide Squad (2004–2008) ==
| Character | Real name | First appearance | Notes |
|---|---|---|---|
| Amanda Waller | | Superman Secret Files & Origins 2004 | |
| Captain Boomerang | George "Digger" Harkness | Superman Secret Files & Origins 2004 | |
| Double Down | Jeremy Tell | Superman Secret Files & Origins 2004 | |
| Killer Frost | Louise Lincoln | Superman Secret Files & Origins 2004 | |
| King Shark | Nanaue | Superman Secret Files & Origins 2004 | |
| Nemesis | Tom Tresser | Superman Secret Files & Origins 2004 | |
| Atom Smasher | Albert Rothstein | 52 #24 | |
| Plastique | Bette Sans Souci | 52 #24 | |
| Count Vertigo | Werner Vertigo | 52 #24 | |
| Captain Boomerang | Owen Mercer | 52 #33 | |
| Persuader | Cole Parker | 52 #33 | Killed by Osiris after the Suicide Squad attacked the Black Marvel Family |
| Electrocutioner | Lester Buchinsky | 52 #33 | |
| Bronze Tiger | Benjamin "Ben" Turner | World War III, Book Three: Hell Is for Heroes | |
| Rick Flag | Anthony Miller | Checkmate (vol. 2) #6 | |
| Icicle | Cameron Mahkent | Checkmate (vol. 2) #6 | |
| Javelin | Unknown | Checkmate (vol. 2) #6 | Hit by a jeep while attempting to save Jewelee |
| Jewelee | Unknown | Checkmate (vol. 2) #6 | |
| Mirror Master | Evan McCulloch | Checkmate (vol. 2) #6 | |
| Punch | Clyde Phillips | Checkmate (vol. 2) #6 | Gunned down by enemy soldiers while attempting to save Jewelee. |
| Tattooed Man | Abel Tarrant | Checkmate (vol. 2) #6 | Killed by Jewelee after he betrayed the team and got Punch killed. |
| Bane | Unknown | Outsiders (vol. 3) #50 | |
| General | Wade Eiling | Outsiders (vol. 3) #50 | |
| King Faraday | Unknown | Checkmate (vol. 2) #18 | |
| Multiplex | Danton Black | Checkmate (vol. 2) #19 | |
| Nightshade | Eve Eden | Checkmate (vol. 2) #20 | |
| Chemo | Unknown | Salvation Run #2 | |

== Suicide Squad (vol. 3) (2007–2008) ==
| Character | Real name | First appearance | Notes |
|---|---|---|---|
| Amanda Waller | | Suicide Squad (vol. 3) #1 | |
| Rick Flag | Anthony Miller | Suicide Squad (vol. 3) #1 | |
| Bronze Tiger | Benjamin "Ben" Turner | Suicide Squad (vol. 3) #1 | |
| Captain Boomerang | George "Digger" Harkness | Suicide Squad (vol. 3) #1 | |
| Nightshade | Eve Eden | Suicide Squad (vol. 3) #1 | |
| Deadshot | Floyd Lawton | Suicide Squad (vol. 3) #1 | |
| Captain Boomerang | Owen Mercer | Suicide Squad (vol. 3) #3 | |
| Multiplex | Danton Black | Suicide Squad (vol. 3) #3 | |
| General | Wade Eiling | Suicide Squad (vol. 3) #3 | |
| Chemo | Unknown | Suicide Squad (vol. 3) #4 | |
| Count Vertigo | Werner Vertigo | Suicide Squad (vol. 3) #4 | |
| King Faraday | Unknown | Suicide Squad (vol. 3) #4 | |
| Marauder | Unknown | Suicide Squad (vol. 3) #4 | Dies; goes rogue and gets blown up by Captain Boomerang. |
| Thinker | Cliff Carmichael | Suicide Squad (vol. 3) #4 | Dies; goes rogue and is shot by Faraday. |
| White Dragon | William Heller | Suicide Squad (vol. 3) #4 | Dies; goes rogue and gets blown up inside his armor by Plastique. |
| Twister | Theresa Zimmer | Suicide Squad (vol. 3) #5 | Dies; killed by White Dragon. |
| Blackguard | Richard Hertz | Suicide Squad (vol. 3) #5 | Dies; head crushed by General Wade Eiling. |
| Windfall | Wendy Jones | Suicide Squad (vol. 3) #5 | Dies; stripped to a skeleton after being dosed with Chemo's toxin. |
| Plastique | Bette Sans Souci | Suicide Squad (vol. 3) #6 | |

== Interim Suicide Squad (2008–2011) ==
| Character | Real name | First appearance | Notes |
|---|---|---|---|
| Plastique | Bette Sans Souci | Manhunter (vol. 4) #33 | |
| Multiplex | Danton Black | Manhunter (vol. 4) #33 | |
| Bronze Tiger | Benjamin "Ben" Turner | Manhunter (vol. 4) #33 | |
| Captain Boomerang | Owen Mercer | Manhunter (vol. 4) #33 | |
| Count Vertigo | Werner Vertigo | Manhunter (vol. 4) #33 | |
| Amanda Waller | | Manhunter (vol. 4) #36 | |
| Rick Flag | Anthony Miller | Blackest Night: Suicide Squad #67 | |
| King Faraday | Unknown | Blackest Night: Suicide Squad #67 | |
| Virtuoso | Unknown | Blackest Night: Suicide Squad #67 | |
| Nightshade | Eve Eden | Blackest Night: Suicide Squad #67 | |
| Yasemin Soze | | Suicide Squad Vol 1 #67 (March 2010) | Killed by Deadshot while she was attempting to have him fight her in a duel to see who the better marksmen was. |

== Convergence: Suicide Squad (2015) ==
| Character | Real name | First appearance | Notes |
|---|---|---|---|
| Amanda Waller | | Convergence: Suicide Squad | |
| Oracle | Barbara Gordon | Convergence: Suicide Squad | |
| Star Sapphire | Carol Ferris | Convergence: Suicide Squad | |
| Bane | Unknown | Convergence: Suicide Squad | |
| Black Manta | David Milton Hyde | Convergence: Suicide Squad | |
| Deathstroke | Slade Wilson | Convergence: Suicide Squad | |
| Count Vertigo | Werner Vertigo | Convergence: Suicide Squad | |
| Deadshot | Floyd Lawton | Convergence: Suicide Squad | |
| Poison Ivy | Pamela Isley | Convergence: Suicide Squad | |
| Captain Boomerang | George "Digger" Harkness | Convergence: Suicide Squad | |
| Bronze Tiger | Benjamin "Ben" Turner | Convergence: Suicide Squad | |
| Cyborg Superman | Henry "Hank" Henshaw | Convergence: Suicide Squad | |
| Alexander "Lex" Luthor | | Convergence: Suicide Squad | From Kingdom Come |

== Suicide Squad (vol. 4) (2011–2014) ==
| Character | Real name | First appearance | Notes |
|---|---|---|---|
| Amanda Waller | | Suicide Squad (vol. 4) #1 | |
| Black Spider | Eric Needham | Suicide Squad (vol. 4) #1 | Left in issue #3 due to injury, returns briefly in issue #5 before returning in issue #8. Betrays the squad and is locked up in issue #14. |
| Deadshot | Floyd Lawton | Suicide Squad (vol. 4) #1 | Killed in issue #12, resurrected in issue #15. |
| El Diablo | Chato Santana | Suicide Squad (vol. 4) #1 | Leaves in issue #5, returns in issue #8. Leaves in issue #14 continuing to serve his sentence. |
| Harley Quinn | Dr. Harleen Frances Quinzel | Suicide Squad (vol. 4) #1 | Escapes in issue #5, returns to Belle Reve in issue #8. |
| King Shark | Nanaue | Suicide Squad (vol. 4) #1 | Unknowingly recruited by the Thinker to kill the Suicide Squad but then works alongside. |
| Savant | Brian Durlin | Suicide Squad (vol. 4) #1 | Left in same issue, returns in issue #6 and then leaves once more in issue #8. |
| Voltaic | Unknown | Suicide Squad (vol. 4) #1 | Killed in issue #2, resurrected in issue #16. Dies again in issue #20. |
| Captain Boomerang | George "Digger" Harkness | Suicide Squad (vol. 4) #3 | Left in same issue, returns in issue #12. Leaves again in issue #14, returns in #24. |
| Yo-Yo | Chang Jie-Ru | Suicide Squad (vol. 4) #3 | Presumed dead in issue #5, revealed alive in issue #8, returns to Belle Reve in issue #10. Killed in issue #18. |
| Light | Unknown | Suicide Squad (vol. 4) #6 | Killed in Resurrection Man #9. |
| Lime | Unknown | Suicide Squad (vol. 4) #6 | Killed in issue #7. |
| Crowbar | Malcolm Tandy | Justice League of America's Vibe #5 | Died in the same issue. |
| Iceberg | Charles Murray | Resurrection Man (vol. 2) #8 | Leaves in issue #14. |
| The Unknown Soldier | Unknown | Suicide Squad (vol. 4) #19 | Leaves in issue #23, returns in issue #24. |
| James Gordon Jr. | | Suicide Squad (vol. 4) #20 | |
| Cheetah | Barbara Ann Minerva | Suicide Squad (vol. 4) #20 | Leaves in issue #23. |

== New Suicide Squad (2014–2016) ==
| Character | Real name | First appearance | Notes |
|---|---|---|---|
| Amanda Waller | | New Suicide Squad #1 | |
| Victor Sage | | New Suicide Squad #1 | Killed in issue #16 |
| Black Manta | David Milton Hyde | New Suicide Squad #1 | |
| Deadshot | Floyd Lawton | New Suicide Squad #1 | |
| Deathstroke | Slade Wilson | New Suicide Squad #1 | Left in the same issue. |
| Harley Quinn | Dr. Harleen Quinzel | New Suicide Squad #1 | |
| Joker's Daughter | Duela Dent | New Suicide Squad #1 | Sent to Arkham in issue #5. |
| Captain Boomerang | George "Digger" Harkness | New Suicide Squad #5 | |
| Man-Bats | Unknown | New Suicide Squad #5 | Three unknown Man-Bats joined the team. All of them died in issue #7 |
| Reverse-Flash | Daniel West | New Suicide Squad #5 | Died during New Suicide Squad: Annual #1 |
| Parasite | Joshua Michael Allen | New Suicide Squad #9 | Leaves in issue #16 |
| Afterthought | Afa | Midnighter Vol. 2 #9 | |
| Crow Jane | Rose Wild | New Suicide Squad #17 | Show to be Members but were not used |
| Lamplight | Unknown | New Suicide Squad #17 | Show to be Members but were not used |
| Mudslide | Unknown | New Suicide Squad #17 | Show to be Members but were not used |
| New Wave | Rebecca Jones | New Suicide Squad #17 | Show to be Members but were not used |
| Cheetah | Barbara Ann Minerva | New Suicide Squad #17 | |
| El Diablo | Chato Santana | New Suicide Squad #17 | |
| Hunky Punk | Dorian Ashemore | New Suicide Squad #19 | Died in issue #20. |

== Suicide Squad (vol. 5) (2016–2019) ==
| Character | Real name | First appearance | Notes |
|---|---|---|---|
| Amanda Waller | | Suicide Squad: Rebirth | |
| Rick Flag | | Suicide Squad: Rebirth | Field leader; Deceased; sacrificed himself to close the door of the Black Vault in (vol. 5) #19; Found and retrieved alive from the Phantom Zone in (vol. 5) #31; leaves the Suicide Squad in (vol. 5) #35 |
| Captain Boomerang | George "Digger" Harkness | Suicide Squad: Rebirth | Deceased; killed by General Zod; resurrected in (vol. 5) #8 |
| Deadshot | Floyd Lawton | Suicide Squad: Rebirth | |
| Harley Quinn | Dr. Harleen Frances Quinzel | Suicide Squad: Rebirth | Field leader as of (vol. 5) #20; No longer leader as of (vol. 5) #27 |
| Enchantress | June Moone | Suicide Squad (vol. 5) #1 | Inhabiting the body of June Moone; dragged into her dimension with her host in (vol. 5) #39 |
| Katana | Tatsu Yamashiro | Suicide Squad (vol. 5) #1 | Formerly Rick Flag's second-in-command; Field leader as of (vol. 5) #27 |
| Killer Croc | Waylon Jones | Suicide Squad (vol. 5) #1 | |
| Hack | Zalika | Suicide Squad (vol. 5) #2 | Killed in issue #13 |
| El Diablo | Chato Santana | Suicide Squad (vol. 5) #8 | |
| Killer Frost | Caitlin Snow | Suicide Squad (vol. 5) #8 | Leaves due to Batman's offer in Justice League vs. Suicide Squad to join the Justice League of America |
| Mad Dog | Unknown | Suicide Squad: War Crimes Special | Deceased; head blown off by Amanda Waller after being captured by the enemy |
| General Zod | Dru-Zod | Suicide Squad (vol. 5) #17 | Betrays the team |
| Juan Soria | | Suicide Squad (vol. 5) #33 | Loses hands; leaves the team in issue #34 |
| Captain Cold | Leonard Snart | Suicide Squad (vol. 5) #41 | Leaves the Suicide Squad in issue #44 (vol. 5) |
| KGBeast | Anatoli Knyazev | Flashback in Suicide Squad (vol. 6) #8 | |
| Lord Satanis | Satanis | Suicide Squad (vol. 5) #45 | |
| Master Jailer | Carl Draper | Suicide Squad (vol. 5) #45 | Deceased: Sacrifices himself to stop a nuke |
| Merlyn | Arthur King | Suicide Squad (vol. 5) Annual #1 | Secondary Suicide Squad |
| Rag Doll | Peter Merkel Jr. | Suicide Squad (vol. 5) Annual #1 | Secondary Suicide Squad; Killed |
| Scream Queen | Nina Skorzeny | Suicide Squad (vol. 5) Annual #1 | Secondary Suicide Squad; Brain Bomb Activated |
| Shimmer | Selinda Flinders | Suicide Squad (vol. 5) Annual #1 | Secondary Suicide Squad; killed |
| Tao Jones | | Suicide Squad (vol. 5) Annual #1 | Secondary Suicide Squad; killed |
| Skorpio | Unknown | Suicide Squad (vol. 5) Annual #1 | Secondary Suicide Squad; killed |
| Baby Boom | Unknown | Suicide Squad (vol. 5) Annual #1 | Secondary Suicide Squad; killed |
| Lawman | Wardell Chambers | The Flash (vol. 5) #75 | Was killed off panel by unknown assailants when the Suicide Squad was sent to retrieve a book |
| Snakebite | Spaulding Pruitt | The Flash (vol. 5) #75 | Was killed when he attempted to escape with the asset, causing Amanda Waller to set off his neck bomb |
| Deadshot | Will Evans | Suicide Squad Most Wanted: Deadshot and Katana #1 | Killed in Suicide Squad Most Wanted: Deadshot and Katana #6 |
| Cheetah | Barbara Ann Minerva | Suicide Squad Most Wanted: Deadshot and Katana #2 | |
| Battleaxe | Unknown | Suicide Squad Most Wanted: Deadshot and Katana #2 | |
| Coldsnap | Darryl | Suicide Squad Most Wanted: Deadshot and Katana #2 | |
| Heatstroke | Joanne | Suicide Squad Most Wanted: Deadshot and Katana #2 | |
| Zoomax | Brian Smith | Suicide Squad Most Wanted: El Diablo and Boomerang #1 | Gets transferred to Task Force Y in Suicide Squad Most Wanted: El Diablo and Killer Croc #4; killed in Suicide Squad Most Wanted: El Diablo and Amanda Waller #5 |
| Cluemaster | Arthur Brown | Suicide Squad Most Wanted: El Diablo and Killer Croc #3 | |

== Suicide Squad (vol. 6) (2019–2020) ==
| Character | Real name | First appearance | Notes |
|---|---|---|---|
| Lok | Not known | Suicide Squad (vol. 6) #1 | Director; killed by Deadshot (vol. 6) #5 |
| Cavalier | Not known | Suicide Squad (vol. 6) #1 | Killed by Osita in (vol. 6) #1 |
| Deadshot | Floyd Lawton | Suicide Squad (vol. 6) #1 | Killed by Black Mask in (vol. 6) #9 |
| Harley Quinn | Dr. Harleen Frances Quinzel | Suicide Squad (vol. 6) #1 | |
| Magpie | Margaret Pye | Suicide Squad (vol. 6) #1 | Killed by Thylacine in (vol. 6) #1 |
| Shark | Karshon | Suicide Squad (vol. 6) #1 | Killed by sharks in (vol. 6) #3 |
| Zebra-Man | Not known | Suicide Squad (vol. 6) #1 | A former member of Cheetah's Menagerie and the Revolutionaries before siding with the Suicide Squad. |
| The Aerie | Not known | Suicide Squad (vol. 6) #1 | |
| Chaos Kitten | Not known | Suicide Squad (vol. 6) #1 | |
| Deadly Six | Not known | Suicide Squad (vol. 6) #1 | |
| Fin | Not known | Suicide Squad (vol. 6) #1 | |
| Jog | Samuel | Suicide Squad (vol. 6) #1 | Killed in (vol. 6) #5, resurrected by the Black Racer in (vol. 6) #11 |
| Osita | Not known | Suicide Squad (vol. 6) #1 | |
| Thylacine | Corinna | Suicide Squad (vol. 6) #1 | |
| Wink | Not known | Suicide Squad (vol. 6) #1 | |
| Black Mask | Roman Sionis | Suicide Squad (vol. 6) #5 | Former de facto leader, disguised as Blue Beetle. |
| Captain Boomerang | George "Digger" Harkness | Suicide Squad (vol. 6) #5 | |

== Suicide Squad (vol. 7) (2021–2022) ==
| Character | Real name | First appearance | Notes |
|---|---|---|---|
| Amanda Waller | | Suicide Squad (vol. 7) #1 | Director. Takes over the Crime Syndicate and turns them into her Justice League for Earth 3 in War for Earth-3 #2. |
| Bolt | Lawrence "Larry" Bolatinsky | Suicide Squad (vol. 7) #1 | Killed by the Talon in Suicide Squad (vol. 7) #1. |
| Film Freak | Unknown | Suicide Squad (vol. 7) #1 | Killed in Suicide Squad (vol. 7) #1. |
| Peacemaker | Christopher Smith | Suicide Squad (vol. 7) #1 | Field leader of the Suicide Squad. Quits team and joins Rick Flag's Suicide Squad in Suicide Squad (vol. 7) #8. |
| Shrike | Boone | Suicide Squad (vol. 7) #1 | Killed in Suicide Squad (vol. 7) #1. |
| Culebra | Alejandra Cortez | Suicide Squad (vol. 7) #2 | Quits team in Suicide Squad (vol. 7) #12. |
| Exit | Jason Phillips | Suicide Squad (vol. 7) #2 | Killed by exposure to Joker venom in Suicide Squad (vol. 7) #2. |
| Mindwarp | Peter Howard | Suicide Squad (vol. 7) #2 | Killed by exposure to Joker venom in Suicide Squad (vol. 7) #2. |
| Nocturna | Natalia Mitternacht | Suicide Squad (vol. 7) #2 | Revealed to be from an alternate universe in Suicide Squad (vol. 7) #7. Quits team in Suicide Squad (vol. 7) #12. Rejoins team in War for Earth-3 (vol. 1) #2. |
| Match | | Suicide Squad (vol. 7) #2 | Originally believed to be Superboy. Revealed as Match in Suicide Squad 2021 Annual (vol. 7) #1. Becomes Ultraman in War for Earth-3 #2. |
| Talon | William Cobb | Suicide Squad (vol. 7) #2 | Great-grandfather of Nightwing. Betrays team in Suicide Squad (vol. 7) #13. Killed in War for Earth-3 #2. |
| Branch | Unknown | Suicide Squad (vol. 7) #3 | Killed in Suicide Squad (vol. 7) #6 |
| Keymaster | Unknown | Suicide Squad (vol. 7) #3 | Killed in Suicide Squad (vol. 7) #3. |
| Warp | Emil LaSalle | Teen Titans Academy #3 | Revealed in Teen Titans Academy #3 to have been resurrected from his suicide from Year of the Villain: Hell Arisen #3. |
| Bloodsport | Robert DuBois | Suicide Squad (vol. 7) #5 | Quits team and joins Rick Flag's Suicide Squad in Suicide Squad (vol. 7) #11. |
| Ambush Bug | Irwin Schwab | Suicide Squad (vol. 7) #7 | Quits team in Suicide Squad (vol. 7) #12. |
| Black Siren | Unknown | Suicide Squad (vol. 7) #7 | Doppelganger of Black Canary from Earth 3. |
| King Shark | Nanaue | Suicide Squad: King Shark Vol 1 #1 | |
| Defacer | Shawn Tsang | Suicide Squad: King Shark Vol 1 #1 | |
| Weasel | John Monroe | Flashback in Suicide Squad: King Shark Vol 1 #6 | |
| Nightmare Nurse | Asa | The Swamp Thing #6 | |
| Chemo | | The Swamp Thing #6 | |
| Parasite | Rudolph Jones | The Swamp Thing #6 | Killed by Hedera in The Swamp Thing #8. |
| Heat Wave | Mick Rory | The Swamp Thing #6 | Officially joined prior in The Flash #773. |
| Major Force | Clifford Zmeck | Suicide Squad (vol. 7) #8 | Field leader of the Suicide Squad. Dies in Suicide Squad (vol. 7) #12. |
| KGBeast | Anatoly Knyazev | Task Force Z #5 | Field leader of the Suicide Squad. Killed in Task Force Z #6. |
| Copperhead | Unknown | Task Force Z #5 | Killed by KGBeast in Task Force Z #7. |
| Victor Zsasz | | Task Force Z #5 | Killed by Jason Todd in Task Force Z #7. |
| Solomon Grundy | Cyrus Gold | Task Force Z #5 | |
| Madame Crow | Abigail O'Shay | Task Force Z #5 | Killed by Mister Freeze in Task Force Z #7. |
| Black Hand | William Hand | War for Earth-3 #1 | Leaves prior to Suicide Squad (vol. 7) #13. |
| Etrigan the Brainiac 666 | | War for Earth-3 #1 | Alternate Etrigan from another reality where he is merged with Brainiac. |
| Gunbunny | Ainsley Blomquist | War for Earth-3 #1 | Leaves prior to Suicide Squad (vol. 7) #13. |
| Gunhawk | Liam Hawkleigh | War for Earth-3 #1 | Leaves prior to Suicide Squad (vol. 7) #13. |

== Interim Suicide Squad (2022-2024) ==
| Character | Real name | First appearance | Notes |
|---|---|---|---|
| Peacemaker | Christopher Smith | Unstoppable Doom Patrol #1 | |
| Velvet | Unknown | Unstoppable Doom Patrol #2 | Spy infiltrating the Doom Patrol using human construct "Worm". |
| Black Alice | Lori Zechlin | Catwoman (vol. 5) #62 | |
| Clock King | William Tockman | Catwoman (vol. 5) #62 | |
| Jeannette | | Catwoman (vol. 5) #62 | |
| Ravager | Rose Wilson | Catwoman (vol. 5) #62 | |
| Sportsmaster | Lawrence Crock | Catwoman (vol. 5) #62 | |
| Catwoman | Selina Kyle | Catwoman (vol. 5) #62 | |

== Suicide Squad: Dream Team (2024) ==
| Character | Real name | First appearance | Notes |
|---|---|---|---|
| Amanda Waller | | Suicide Squad: Dream Team #1 | Director. |
| Bizarro | | Suicide Squad: Dream Team #1 | |
| Black Alice | Lori Zechlin | Suicide Squad: Dream Team #1 | |
| Clock King | William Tockman | Suicide Squad: Dream Team #1 | |
| Deadeye | Archie Waller | Suicide Squad: Dream Team #1 | Field commander. Also nephew of Amanda Waller. |
| Dreamer | Nia Nal | Suicide Squad: Dream Team #1 | |
| Harley Quinn | Harleen Quinzel | Suicide Squad: Dream Team #1 | |
| Time Commander | John Starr | Absolute Power: Ground Zero #1 | |
| Parasite | Rudolph Jones | Absolute Power: Task Force VII #1 | |

== Other versions of the Suicide Squad in the comics ==
=== Thinker's false Suicide Squad/Reverse Suicide Squad ===
| Character | Real name | First appearance | Notes |
|---|---|---|---|
| Thinker | Unknown | Suicide Squad (Vol 4) #25 | Leader |
| Unknown Soldier | Unknown | Suicide Squad (Vol 4) #25 | |
| Steel | John Henry Irons | Suicide Squad (Vol 4) #25 | |
| Warrant | Unknown | Suicide Squad (Vol 4) #25 | |
| Power Girl | Kara Zor-El | Suicide Squad (Vol 4) #25 | Alternate version from Earth 2 |

=== Suicide Squad Black/Limbo Legion ===
| Character | Real name | | Notes |
|---|---|---|---|
| Amanda Waller | | Suicide Squad: Black Files #1 | Director. |
| El Diablo | Chato Santana | Suicide Squad: Black Files #1 | Field Commander |
| Alchemaster | Hans Rischar | Suicide Squad: Black Files #1 | |
| Azucar | Veronica Lopez | Suicide Squad: Black Files #1 | |
| Doctor Thurmaturge | Unknown | Suicide Squad: Black Files #1 | |
| Enchantress | June Moone | Suicide Squad: Black Files #1 | |
| Gentleman Ghost | James Craddock | Suicide Squad: Black Files #1 | |
| Juniper | Zahra Abed | Suicide Squad: Black Files #1 | |
| Klarion the Witch Boy | Klarion Bleak | Suicide Squad: Black Files #1 | |
| Tiamat/Snarlgoyle | Katie Randles | Suicide Squad: Black Files #1 | |
| Aladdin | Unknown | Suicide Squad: Black Files #1 | |
| Wither | Jade Tice | Suicide Squad: Black Files #6 | |
| Black Bison | Black-Cloud-In-Morning | Suicide Squad: King Shark #2 | |
| Etrigan | Jason Blood | Suicide Squad: King Shark #2 | |
| Pigeon | Beatrice Butler | Suicide Squad: King Shark #2 | |

=== First Suicide Squad ===
| Character | Real name | First appearance | Notes |
|---|---|---|---|
| Rustam | Raza Kattuah | Justice League vs. Suicide Squad #1 | Field Leader |
| Johnny Sorrow | Johnathan Sorrow | Justice League vs. Suicide Squad #1 | Physical form destroyed; his mask is stored safe in a laboratory. |
| Doctor Polaris | Neal Emerson | Justice League vs. Suicide Squad #1 | |
| Emerald Empress | Sarya | Justice League vs. Suicide Squad #1 | Her life source (The Emerald Eye) is crumbling apart. |
| Lobo | Unpronounceable | Justice League vs. Suicide Squad #1 | Member of Justice League America. |
| Cyclotron | Clarence Simms | Suicide Squad (vol. 5) #9 | Dies; impaled by Lobo in the same issue. |

=== Task Force Y ===
| Character | Real name | First appearance | Notes |
|---|---|---|---|
| Behemoth | Taro Raiden | Suicide Squad Most Wanted: El Diablo and Boomerang #1 | |
| Leviathan | Lester Witz | Suicide Squad Most Wanted: El Diablo and Boomerang #1 | |
| Zizz | Unknown | Suicide Squad Most Wanted: El Diablo and Boomerang #1 | |
| Bloodletter | Unknown | Suicide Squad Most Wanted: El Diablo and Killer Croc #4 | Field Leader |
| Zoomax | Brian Smith | Suicide Squad Most Wanted: El Diablo and Killer Croc #4 | Defected from Suicide Squad; killed in Suicide Squad Most Wanted: El Diablo and Amanda Waller #5 |

=== Task Force XL ===
| Character | Real name | First appearance | Notes |
|---|---|---|---|
| Akando | Unknown | Damage (vol. 2) #1 | |
| Deadshot | Floyd Lawton | Damage (vol. 2) #1 | Quits in Suicide Squad (vol. 5) #36 |
| Giganta | Doris Zuel | Damage (vol. 2) #1 | |
| Harley Quinn | Harleen Quinzel | Damage (vol. 2) #1 | |
| Parasite | Joshua Michael Allen | Damage (vol. 2) #1 | |
| Solomon Grundy | Cyrus Gold | Damage (vol. 2) #1 | |
| Captain Boomerang | George "Digger" Harkness | Suicide Squad (Vol 5) #36 | |
| Katana | Tatsu Yamashiro | Suicide Squad (Vol 5) #36 | |

=== Task Force XI ===
| Character | Real name | First appearance | Notes |
|---|---|---|---|
| Brainwave | Henry King, Jr. | Justice League: No Justice #1 | |
| Doctor Destiny | John Dee | Justice League: No Justice #1 | |
| Doctor Psycho | Edgar Cizko | Justice League: No Justice #1 | |
| Dubbilex | | Justice League: No Justice #1 | |
| Hector Hammond | | Justice League: No Justice #1 | |
| Jemm | | Justice League: No Justice #1 | |
| Looker | Emily "Lia" Briggs | Justice League: No Justice #1 | |
| Manchester Black | | Justice League: No Justice #1 | |
| Maxwell Lord | | Justice League: No Justice #1 | Quits in Wonder Woman #761 |
| Mento | Steve Dayton | Justice League: No Justice #1 | |
| Multi-Man | Duncan Pramble | Justice League: No Justice #1 | |
| Psimon | Simon Jones | Justice League: No Justice #1 | |

=== Suicide Squad Seven ===
| Character | Real name | First appearance | Notes |
|---|---|---|---|
| Acero | Unknown | DC's Round Robin #1 | |
| Dulce | Unknown | DC's Round Robin #1 | |
| El Dorado | Unknown | DC's Round Robin #1 | |
| El Gaucho | Santiago Vargas | DC's Round Robin #1 | Field leader. |
| Harley Quinn | Harleen Quinzel | DC's Round Robin #1 | |
| Monstruo | Nadège Toussaint | DC's Round Robin #1 | |
| Silbón | Unknown | DC's Round Robin #1 | |
| Zachary Zatara | | DC's Round Robin #1 | |

=== Hell Squad ===
| Character | Real name | First appearance | Notes |
|---|---|---|---|
| Mindwarp | Peter Howard | Suicide Squad (vol. 7) #7 | Leader |
| Blackguard | Richard "Dick" Hertz | Suicide Squad (vol. 7) #7 | |
| Branch | Unknown | Suicide Squad (vol. 7) #7 | |
| Cavalier | Hudson Pyle | Suicide Squad (vol. 7) #7 | |
| Mad Dog | Unknown | Suicide Squad (vol. 7) #7 | |
| Slipknot | Christopher Weiss | Suicide Squad (vol. 7) #7 | |
| Weasel | John Monroe | Suicide Squad (vol. 7) #7 | |

=== Rick Flag's Suicide Squad ===
| Character | Real name | First appearance | Notes |
|---|---|---|---|
| Rick Flag | | Suicide Squad (vol. 7) #8 | Formed his own squad to oppose Amanda Waller's main squad. |
| Cheetah | Barbara Ann Minerva | Suicide Squad (vol. 7) #8 | Presumed killed in Suicide Squad (vol. 7) #12. |
| Mirror Master | Samuel Joseph "Sam" Scudder | Suicide Squad (vol. 7) #8 | |
| Parademon | Ghkeyy't | Suicide Squad (vol. 7) #8 | Presumed killed in Suicide Squad (vol. 7) #12. |
| Peacemaker | Christopher Smith | Suicide Squad (vol. 7) #8 | Defected from the main Suicide Squad. |
| Fisherman | Unknown | Suicide Squad (vol. 7) #9 | Killed in War for Earth-3 #1 |
| Lor-Zod | | Suicide Squad (vol. 7) #9 | Presumed killed in Suicide Squad (vol. 7) #12. |
| Bloodsport | Robert DuBois | Suicide Squad (vol. 7) #11 | Defected from the main Suicide Squad. |
| Ambush Bug | Irwin Schwab | War for Earth-3 #1 | Defected from the main Suicide Squad. |
| Culebra | Alejandra Cortez | War for Earth-3 #1 | Defected from the main Suicide Squad. |
| Nocturna | Natalia Mitternacht | War for Earth-3 #1 | Defected from the main Suicide Squad. Quits team and rejoins the main Suicide Squad in War for Earth-3 #2. |
| Doctor Rodriguez | Unknown | War for Earth-3 #1 | |
| Clayface | Unknown | War for Earth-3 #1 | Alternate version from Earth 23. Left prior to Suicide Squad (vol. 7) #14. |
| Captain Boomerang | Digger Harkness | Teen Titans Academy #13 | Left prior to Suicide Squad (vol. 7) #14. |
| Harley Quinn | Harleen Quinzel | Teen Titans Academy #13 | Alternate version from Earth 8. Left prior to Suicide Squad (vol. 7) #14 |
| Bizarro Boy | Unknown | Suicide Squad (vol. 7) #14 | |

=== Task Force ✱/Suicide Squad Dark ===
| Character | Real name | First appearance | Notes |
|---|---|---|---|
| Amanda Waller | | DC's Round Robin #2 | Director of Task Force ✱. |
| Batman | Bruce Wayne | DC's Round Robin #2 | Field leader. Alternate version from Earth-43. |
| Frankenstein | | DC's Round Robin #2 | Handler. |
| Grodd | | DC's Round Robin #2 | Alternate version from Earth-13. |
| Matter-Eater Lad | Tenzil Kem | DC's Round Robin #2 | Killed in DC's Round Robin #2. |
| Plasma-Man | Patrick "Eel" O'Brian | DC's Round Robin #2 | Alternate Plastic Man from Earth-43. |
| Raven | Unknown | DC's Round Robin #2 | Alternate version from Earth-13. |
| Sinestro | Thaal Sinestro | DC's Round Robin #2 | Alternate version from an unknown reality. |
| Spore | Unknown | DC's Round Robin #2 | Alternate Swamp Thing from Earth-41. |
| Zatanna | Zatanna Zatara | DC's Round Robin #2 | Alternate version from Earth-13. |

=== Task Force Z ===
| Character | Real name | First appearance | Notes |
|---|---|---|---|
| Red Hood | Jason Todd | Detective Comics #1043 | Field leader of Task Force Z. |
| Gotham/Bane | Henry Clover, Jr. | Detective Comics #1043 | Revealed in Task Force Z #10 to be Gotham in disguise |
| Man-Bat | Dr. Robert Kirkland "Kirk" Langstrom | Detective Comics #1043 | |
| Arkham Knight | Astrid Arkham | Detective Comics #1043 | |
| Sundowner | Hanna Hobart | Detective Comics #1043 | |
| Mr. Bloom | Unknown | Detective Comics #1043 | Betrays team in Task Force Z #6 |
| Two-Face | Harvey Dent | Task Force Z #1 | Founder of Task Force Z who initially goes by the identity of Director Crispin. |
| Deadshot | Floyd Lawton | Task Force Z #3 | Leaves team prior to Task Force Z #6 |
| Mr. Freeze | Victor Fries | Task Force Z #5 | Betrays the team during Task Force Z #7 |
| KGBeast | Anatoly Knyazev | Task Force Z #5 | |
| Copperhead | Unknown | Task Force Z #5 | |
| Victor Zsasz | | Task Force Z #5 | |
| Solomon Grundy | Cyrus Gold | Task Force Z #5 | |
| Madame Crow | Abigail O'Shay | Task Force Z #5 | |

=== Task Force XX ===
| Character | Real name | First appearance | Notes |
|---|---|---|---|
| Bronze Tiger | Benjamin "Ben" Turner | Harley Quinn (vol. 4) #18 | |
| Dreadbolt | Terry Bolatinsky | Harley Quinn (vol. 4) #18 | Killed in Harley Quinn (vol. 4) #19. |
| Harley Quinn | Harleen Quinzel | Harley Quinn (vol. 4) #18 | |
| Killer Frost | Caitlin Snow | Harley Quinn (vol. 4) #18 | |
| Lashina | | Harley Quinn (vol. 4) #18 | |
| Luke Fox | | Harley Quinn (vol. 4) #18 | Team leader. |
| Solomon Grundy | Cyrus Gold | Harley Quinn (vol. 4) #18 | |
| The Verdict | Samantha Payne | Harley Quinn (vol. 4) #18 | |

=== Task Force VII ===
| Character | Real name | First appearance | Notes |
|---|---|---|---|
| Failsafe | | Absolute Power #1 | Leader |
| Depth Charge | | Absolute Power #1 | |
| Global Guardian | | Absolute Power #1 | |
| Jadestone | | Absolute Power #1 | |
| Last Son | | Absolute Power #1 | |
| Paradise Lost | | Absolute Power #1 | |
| Velocity | | Absolute Power #1 | |

=== Justice Squad ===
| Character | Real name | First appearance | Notes |
|---|---|---|---|
| Amanda Waller | | Future State: Suicide Squad #1 | Leader |
| Superman | Conner Kent/Kon-El | Future State: Suicide Squad #1 | |
| Batman | William Cobb | Future State: Suicide Squad #1 | |
| Wonder Woman | Hypnotic Woman | Future State: Suicide Squad #1 | |
| Flash | Alinta | Future State: Suicide Squad #1 | |
| Aquaman | Fisherman | Future State: Suicide Squad #1 | |
| Martian Manhunter | Clayface | Future State: Suicide Squad #1 | |

=== Batman's Suicide Squad ===
| Character | Real name | First appearance | Notes |
|---|---|---|---|
| Batman | Bruce Wayne | Batman (Vol 3) #9 | Leader |
| Ventriloquist | Arnold Wesker | Batman (Vol 3) #9 | |
| Bronze Tiger | Benjamin "Ben" Turner | Batman (Vol 3) #9 | |
| Punch | Unknown | Batman (Vol 3) #9 | |
| Jewlee | Unknown | Batman (Vol 3) #9 | |
| Catwoman | Selina Kyle | Batman (Vol 3) #9 | |

== In other media ==
=== Arrow (2014–2020) ===
Two versions of the Suicide Squad appear the Arrowverse as listed below.

| Character | Real name | Actor/actress | First appearance | Notes |
Task Force X
| Amanda Waller | | Cynthia Addai-Robinson | Arrow (2014–present) | Director; Deceased; Killed by member of Shadowspire. |
| Harbinger | Lyla Michaels | Audrey Marie Anderson | Arrow (2014–present) | Field leader. |
| Freelancer | John Diggle | David Ramsey | Arrow (2014–present) | Temporary member. |
| Deadshot | Floyd Lawton | Michael Rowe | Arrow (2014–present) | Deceased; Sacrificed himself for team. |
| Bronze Tiger | Benjamin "Ben" Turner | Michael Jai White | Arrow (2014–present) | |
| Shrapnel | Mark Scheffer | Sean Maher | Arrow (2014–present) | Deceased; head blown up when trying to escape. |
| Cupid | Carrie Cutter | Amy Gumenick | Arrow (2014–present) | |
| Captain Boomerang | George "Digger" Harkness | Nick E. Tarabay | Arrow (2014–present) | Former member; came seeking revenge on team. |
| Harley Quinn | Harleen Quinzel | Cassidy Alexa (portrayer); Tara Strong (voice only) | Arrow (2014–present) | Cameo |
| Ghost Initiative | | | Arrow (2014–present) | |
| The Dragon | Ricardo Diaz | Kirk Acevedo | Arrow (2018–present) | Deceased: burnt to death by Emiko Queen for betraying the Ninth Circle. |
| China White | Chien Na Wei | Kelly Hu | Arrow (2018–present) | |
| Kane Wolfman | Joseph Wilson | Liam Hall | Arrow (2018–present) | |
| Cupid | Carrie Cutter | Amy Gumenick | Arrow (2018–present) | |

=== DC Extended Universe (2016–2023) ===
| Character | Real name | Performed by | Joined in | Notes |
|---|---|---|---|---|
**Founder**
| Amanda Waller | | Viola Davis | Suicide Squad (August 2016) | Founder of Task Force X and director of A.R.G.U.S. |
**Founding members**
| Captain Boomerang | George "Digger" Harkness | Jai Courtney | Suicide Squad (August 2016) | Deceased |
| Deadshot | Floyd Lawton | Will Smith | Suicide Squad (August 2016) | |
| El Diablo | Chato Santana | Jay Hernandez | Suicide Squad (August 2016) | Deceased |
| Enchantress | June Moone | Cara Delevingne | Suicide Squad (August 2016) | Deceased |
| Rick Flag | Richard Flag, Jr. | Joel Kinnaman | Suicide Squad (August 2016) | Deceased; former field leader of Task Force X and agent of A.R.G.U.S. |
| Harley Quinn | Harleen Frances Quinzel | Margot Robbie | Suicide Squad (August 2016) | Current member of Task Force X. |
| Katana | Tatsu Yamashiro | Karen Fukuhara | Suicide Squad (August 2016) | A volunteer member of the Task Force X. |
| Killer Croc | Waylon Jones | Adewale Akinnuoye-Agbaje | Suicide Squad (August 2016) | |
| Slipknot | Christopher Weiss | Adam Beach | Suicide Squad (August 2016) | Deceased |
**Team One**
| Blackguard | Richard "Dick" Hertz | Pete Davidson | The Suicide Squad (August 2021) | Deceased |
| Javelin | Gunter Braun | Flula Borg | The Suicide Squad (August 2021) | Deceased |
| Mongal | | Mayling Ng | The Suicide Squad (August 2021) | Deceased |
| Savant | Brian Durlin | Michael Rooker | The Suicide Squad (August 2021) | Deceased |
| T.D.K. (The Detachable Kid) | Cory Pitzner | Nathan Fillion | The Suicide Squad (August 2021) | |
| Weasel | Unknown | Sean Gunn | The Suicide Squad (August 2021) | |
**Team Two**
| Bloodsport | Robert DuBois | Idris Elba | The Suicide Squad (August 2021) | Field leader of Team Two. |
| King Shark | Nanaue | Steve Agee (motion-capture); Sylvester Stallone (voice) | The Suicide Squad (August 2021) | |
| Peacemaker | Christopher Smith | John Cena | The Suicide Squad (August 2021) | |
| Polka-Dot Man | Abner Krill | David Dastmalchian | The Suicide Squad (August 2021) | Deceased |
| Ratcatcher 2 | Cleo Cazo | Daniela Melchior | The Suicide Squad (August 2021) | The daughter of the unnamed Ratcatcher. |

=== 11th Street Kids (DC Extended Universe/DC Universe) ===
| Character | Real name | Performed by | First appearance | Notes |
|---|---|---|---|---|
| Clemson Murn | Ik Nobe Llok | Chukwudi Iwuji | Peacemaker ("A Whole New Whirled") | Deceased; former leader |
| Emilia Harcourt | | Jennifer Holland | Peacemaker ("A Whole New Whirled") | Current leader |
| John Economos | | Steve Agee | Peacemaker ("A Whole New Whirled") | Mission coordinator |
| Leota Adebayo | Leota Waller | Danielle Brooks | Peacemaker ("A Whole New Whirled") | |
| Peacemaker | Christopher Smith | John Cena | Peacemaker ("A Whole New Whirled") | |
| Eagly | | CGI | Peacemaker ("A Whole New Whirled") | |
| Vigilante | Adrian Chase | Freddie Stroma | Peacemaker ("Better Goff Dead") | |

=== Task Force M/Creature Commandos ===
| Character | Real name | First appearance | Notes |
|---|---|---|---|
| Amanda Waller | | Creature Commandos ("The Collywobbles") | Director |
| Richard Bill Flag, Sr. | | Creature Commandos ("The Collywobbles") | Former field commander |
| Bride | | Creature Commandos ("The Collywobbles") | Field commander |
| Doctor Phosphorus | Alexander "Alex" Sartorius | Creature Commandos ("The Collywobbles") | |
| Weasel | Unknown | Creature Commandos ("The Collywobbles") | |
| G.I. Robot | | Creature Commandos ("The Collywobbles") | |
| Nina Mazursky | | Creature Commandos ("The Collywobbles") | Deceased |
| Nosferata | | Creature Commandos ("A Very Funny Monster") | |
| Khalis | | Creature Commandos ("A Very Funny Monster") | |
| King Shark | Nanaue | Creature Commandos ("A Very Funny Monster") | |

=== DC Animated Movie Universe (2018–2020) ===
| Character | Real name | Voice actor | First appearance | Notes |
|---|---|---|---|---|
| Amanda Waller | | Vanessa Williams | | Deceased |
| Deadshot | Floyd Lawton | Christian Slater | Suicide Squad: Hell to Pay | Team leader; current status is unknown |
| Captain Boomerang | George "Digger" Harkness | Liam McIntyre | Suicide Squad: Hell to Pay | Deceased |
| Harley Quinn | Harleen Quinzel | Tara Strong | Suicide Squad: Hell to Pay | Deceased |
| Killer Frost | Crystal Frost | Kristin Bauer van Straten | Suicide Squad: Hell to Pay | Deceased |
| Copperhead | Sameer Park | Gideon Emery | Suicide Squad: Hell to Pay | Deceased |
| Bronze Tiger | Benjamin "Ben" Turner | Billy Brown | Suicide Squad: Hell to Pay | Deceased |
| Count Vertigo | Werner Zytle | Jim Pirri | Suicide Squad: Hell to Pay | Deceased |
| Black Manta | Unknown | Dave Fennoy | Suicide Squad: Hell to Pay | Deceased |
| Punch | Unknown | Trevor Devall | Suicide Squad: Hell to Pay | Deceased |
| Jewelee | Unknown | Julie Nathanson | Suicide Squad: Hell to Pay | Deceased |
| Ten-Eyed Man | Unknown | N/A | Suicide Squad: Hell to Pay | Deceased |
| Bane | Unknown | Adam Gifford | Batman: Hush | Deceased |
| Cheetah | Barbara Ann Minerva | Non-speaking role | Wonder Woman: Bloodlines | Deceased |
| King Shark | Nanaue | John DiMaggio | Justice League Dark: Apokolips War | Deceased |

=== Batman: Arkham (2024) ===
The animated film Batman: Assault on Arkham (2014) was later confirmed to be not-canon to the Batman: Arkham series due to the release of Suicide Squad: Kill the Justice League (2024).

| Character | Real name | Voiced by | Joined in | Notes |
|---|---|---|---|---|
Founder
| Amanda Waller | | CCH Pounder (2013) Debra Wilson (2024) | Batman: Arkham Origins (October 2013) | Founder of Task Force X and director of A.R.G.U.S. |
Field Team
| Deadshot | Floyd Lawton | Bumper Robinson | Suicide Squad: Kill the Justice League (February 2024) | Claims that the Deadshot who appeared in previous Batman: Arkham games was an imposter. |
| Captain Boomerang | George Harkness | Daniel Lapaine | Suicide Squad: Kill the Justice League (February 2024) | |
| Harley Quinn | Harleen Quinzel | Tara Strong | Suicide Squad: Kill the Justice League (February 2024) | |
| King Shark | Nanaue | Joe Seanoa | Suicide Squad: Kill the Justice League (February 2024) | |
| The Joker | Unknown | JP Karliak | Suicide Squad: Kill the Justice League (February 2024) | An alternate reality version of Batman's deceased arch-nemesis. |
| Mrs. Freeze | Victoria Frias | Erika Ishii | Suicide Squad: Kill the Justice League (February 2024) | An alternate reality version of Victor Fries / Mr. Freeze. |
| Lawless | Zoe Lawton | Marley Soleil | Suicide Squad: Kill the Justice League (February 2024) | |
| Deathstroke | Slade Wilson | Glenn Wrage | Suicide Squad: Kill the Justice League (February 2024) | |
Support Team
| Rick Flag | Richard "Rick" Flag | Jim Pirri | Suicide Squad: Kill the Justice League (February 2024) | An A.R.G.U.S. operative working for Waller and specialist to unlock additional weapon brands/manufacturers for the Squad. |
| Hack | Zalika | Omono Okojie | Suicide Squad: Kill the Justice League (February 2024) | Contracts and Talent Point specialist for the Squad. |
| Penguin | Oswald Cobblepot | Nolan North | Suicide Squad: Kill the Justice League (February 2024) | Weapons manufacturer for the Squad. |
| Gizmo | Mikron O'Jeneus | Rick Pasqualone | Suicide Squad: Kill the Justice League (February 2024) | Vehicle specialist for the Squad. |
| Ivy | | Darcy Rose Byrnes | Suicide Squad: Kill the Justice League (February 2024) | Reincarnation/Clone of the original Poison Ivy and Affliction specialist for the Squad. |
| Toyman | Hiro Okamura | Christopher Sean | Suicide Squad: Kill the Justice League (February 2024) | Augments specialist for the Squad. |
| Lex Luthor | Alexander "Lex" Luthor | Corey Burton | Suicide Squad: Kill the Justice League (February 2024) | An alternate reality version of Lex Luthor and Weapon Nano-Enhancement specialist for the Squad. |
