= Dan Curtis Johnson =

American programmer and comic book writer

Dan Curtis Johnson (also DC Johnson, D. Curtis Johnson) is an American programmer and comic book writer, known primarily for his creation (with J. H. Williams III) of the DC Comics series Chase, numerous Secret Files stories, and for having converted the character of Mister Bones from a former low-level supervillain to a high-level bureaucrat of the Department of Extranormal Operations (also created by Johnson).

Gail Simone has described him as "belong(ing) in (her) personal hall of fame".

Also a participant in the DHMO hoax, in which he created a foil website for DHMO.org.
