= The Virtuoso =

The Virtuoso may refer to:

- The Virtuoso (play), a 1676 play by Thomas Shadwell
- The Virtuoso (film), a 2021 film directed by Nick Stagliano

== See also ==
- Virtuoso (disambiguation)
