= Department of Extranormal Operations =

Fictional government agency in the DC Universe

Publication information
- Publisher: DC Comics
- First appearance: Batman #550 (1998)
- Created by: Dan Curtis Johnson and J. H. Williams III

In-story information
- Type of organization: Federal Law Enforcement Agency
- Leader(s): Mister Bones; Dr. Amanda Waller; Cameron Chase
- Agent(s): Agent Sandra "the Bear" Barrett; Agent Kate Spencer; Alesandra Taracon; Donald Fite and Ishido Maad; Sarge Steel; Agent Liberty; Batwoman

The Department of Extranormal Operations (DEO) is a government agency in the DC Universe appearing in American comic books published by DC Comics. It was co-created by Dan Curtis Johnson and J. H. Williams III and first appeared in Batman #550 (1998). The agency was the focus of the Chase series. It is featured in the Supergirl television series. The agency has a complicated relationship with the depiction of law and constitutional rights in the DC Universe.

== Fictional organization history ==
The role of the DEO is to monitor those with extranormal superpowers and to prevent any threat to the general public.

A rogue department of the DEO manages to convince Kyle Rayner to scan various heroes, presumably to detect a body-hopping supervillain. Instead, the data is used to create a new version of Amazo. Chase, Mister Bones, Kyle, and other heroes shut down the division. Amazo is destroyed and Kyle deletes the relevant information.

Batwoman becomes a reluctant agent of the DEO after the agency learns her identity. Mister Bones, director of the DEO, believes himself to be the illegitimate son of Col. Jacob Kane, Batwoman's father. DEO agents discover that Beth Kane, Batwoman's identical twin sister, is alive and capture her. Bones blackmails Batwoman into helping the DEO uncover the secret identity of Batman in exchange for Beth. Batwoman and her allies are unable to rescue Beth and Bones attempts to kill her. Agent Asaf, suborned by Batwoman, shoots Bones in the head and frees Beth. Bones is brain-damaged, but survives.

== Operatives ==
=== Executive directors ===
- Mister Bones – Pre-Crisis/Post-Crisis
- Amanda Waller – The New 52
- Cameron Chase – DC Rebirth
- Martin Stein – Founder of the Department of Metahuman Affairs.
- Sarge Steel – Director of the Department of Metahuman Affairs.

=== Agents ===
- Agent Sandra "The Bear" Barrett
- Agent Kate Spencer
- Alesandra Taracon (undercover as "Cucilla" in Slabside Penitentiary).
- Donald Fite and Ishido Maad (occasional allies of Young Justice, seconded from A.P.E.S.).
- Agent Liberty
- Batwoman

== In other media ==
=== Television ===
- The Department of Extranormal Operations appears in Supergirl, initially led by J'onn J'onzz before Alex Danvers eventually succeeds him and consisting of Brainiac 5 and Raymond Jensen.
- The Department of Extranormal Operations appears in the Legends of Tomorrow episode "Ground Control to Sara Lance".

=== Film ===
The Department of Extranormal Operations appears in Green Lantern, consisting of Amanda Waller.

=== Video games ===
The Department of Extranormal Operations appears in Batman: Arkham Origins Blackgate.

=== Miscellaneous ===
The Department of Extranormal Operations appears in Smallville Season 11, led by Mister Bones and Steve Trevor and consisting of Cameron Chase, Green Arrow, and Diana Prince.
