= Global Peace Agency =

Fictional DC Comics organization

Publication information
- Publisher: DC Comics
- First appearance: OMAC #1 (October 1974)
- Created by: Jack Kirby

In-story information
- Agent(s): Renee Montoya; Mister Bones; Buddy Blank

The Global Peace Agency (GPA) is a fictional law enforcement organization in the DC Comics Universe. The organization first appeared in the series OMAC by Jack Kirby. GPA agents are nameless and faceless, using cosmetic spray to hide their faces.

Initially existing in the near future, the Global Peace Agency was brought into the present-day DC universe in Final Crisis #7 (March 2009).

== History ==
The Global Peace Agency was founded by the alien Visionaries, who seek to preserve civilizations "preferably by indirect scientific means". One of the Visionaries, Professor Z, discovers that humanity is on the verge of causing a calamity known as the Great Disaster and urges the Visionaries' Council of Science to intervene on Earth's behalf. The Council support Z's research and form the Global Peace Agency. Disguised as humans, the members of the Global Peace Agency operate on Earth and form a law enforcement cartel.

The Global Peace Agency helps Earth's scientific community, particularly Myron Forest, to develop the Brother Eye satellite system. They also initiate the OMAC Project, which transformed stockroom clerk Buddy Blank into a "One-Man Army Corps".

After the events of Final Crisis, the GPA begins gathering particularly dangerous technology, such as the Cosmic Treadmill, the Time Pool, and the Miracle Machine. These objects are deposited in Electric City, an alternate plane of reality that only intersects tangentially and in special occasions with the main universe. The GPA goes on to recruit Renee Montoya, Mister Bones, Cameron Chase, and Nemesis.

== In other media ==
- The Global Peace Agency appears in the Batman: The Brave and the Bold episode "When OMAC Attacks!", with its leaders voiced by Dee Bradley Baker and Keone Young.
- Myron Forest appears in the Arrow episode "The Secret Origin of Felicity Smoak", portrayed by Matthew McLellan. This version is a contemporary hacktivist and former MIT student.
