= Virtuoso (disambiguation) =

A virtuoso is an individual who possesses outstanding technical ability in a particular art.

Virtuoso may also refer to:

== Arts and entertainment ==
- Virtuoso (comics), a supervillain from DC Comics
- Virtuoso (Joe Pass album), 1973
- Virtuoso (David Garrett album), 2007
- "Virtuoso" (Star Trek: Voyager), a 2000 episode
- Virtuoso (rapper), American rapper and record executive
- Virtuoso Quartet, a British music group founded in 1924
- Virtuoso (video game), 1994
- The Virtuoso (play), a Restoration comedy
- The Virtuoso (film), a 2021 film
- Virtuoso (sculpture), a concrete sculpture by David Adickes in downtown Houston, 1988

== Other uses ==
- Deonna Purrazzo (born 1994), an American professional wrestler nicknamed "The Virtuosa"
- Virtuoso Universal Server, middleware and database engine hybrid
- Aeros Virtuoso, a Ukrainian paraglider
- Ricardo Virtuoso (born 1984), a Brazilian football player

== See also ==
- Mills Violano-Virtuoso, a machine manufactured by Mills Novelty Company that played a violin or piano
