= David Adickes =

American sculptor (1927–2025)

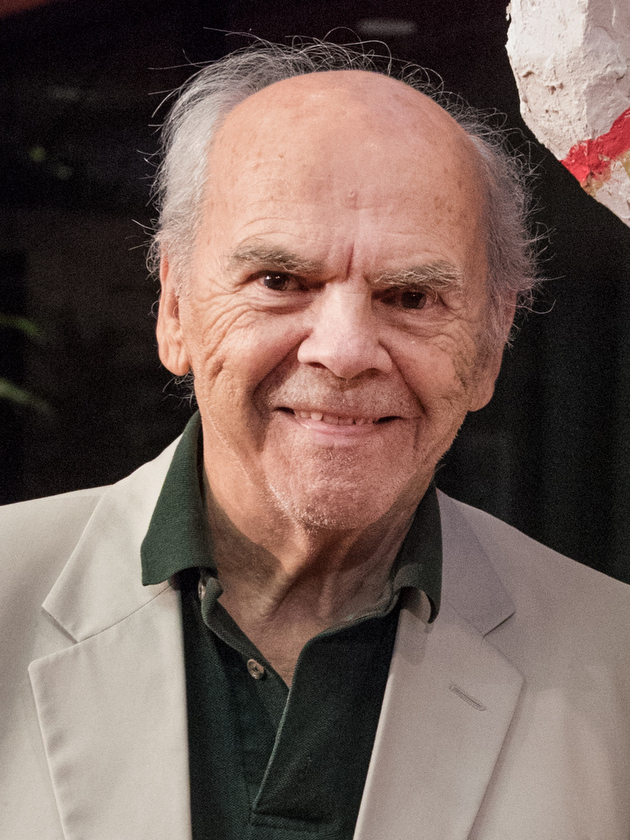
- Adickes in 2015
- Born: David Pryor Adickes; January 19, 1927; Huntsville, Texas, U.S.
- Died: July 13, 2025 (aged 98)
- Known for: Sculpture
- Notable work: A Tribute to Courage

David Pryor Adickes (/ˈædɪks/ AD-iks; January 19, 1927 – July 13, 2025) was an American modernist sculptor and painter. His most famous work is the 67-foot (20 m) tall A Tribute to Courage statue of Sam Houston in Huntsville, Texas.

== Life and career ==
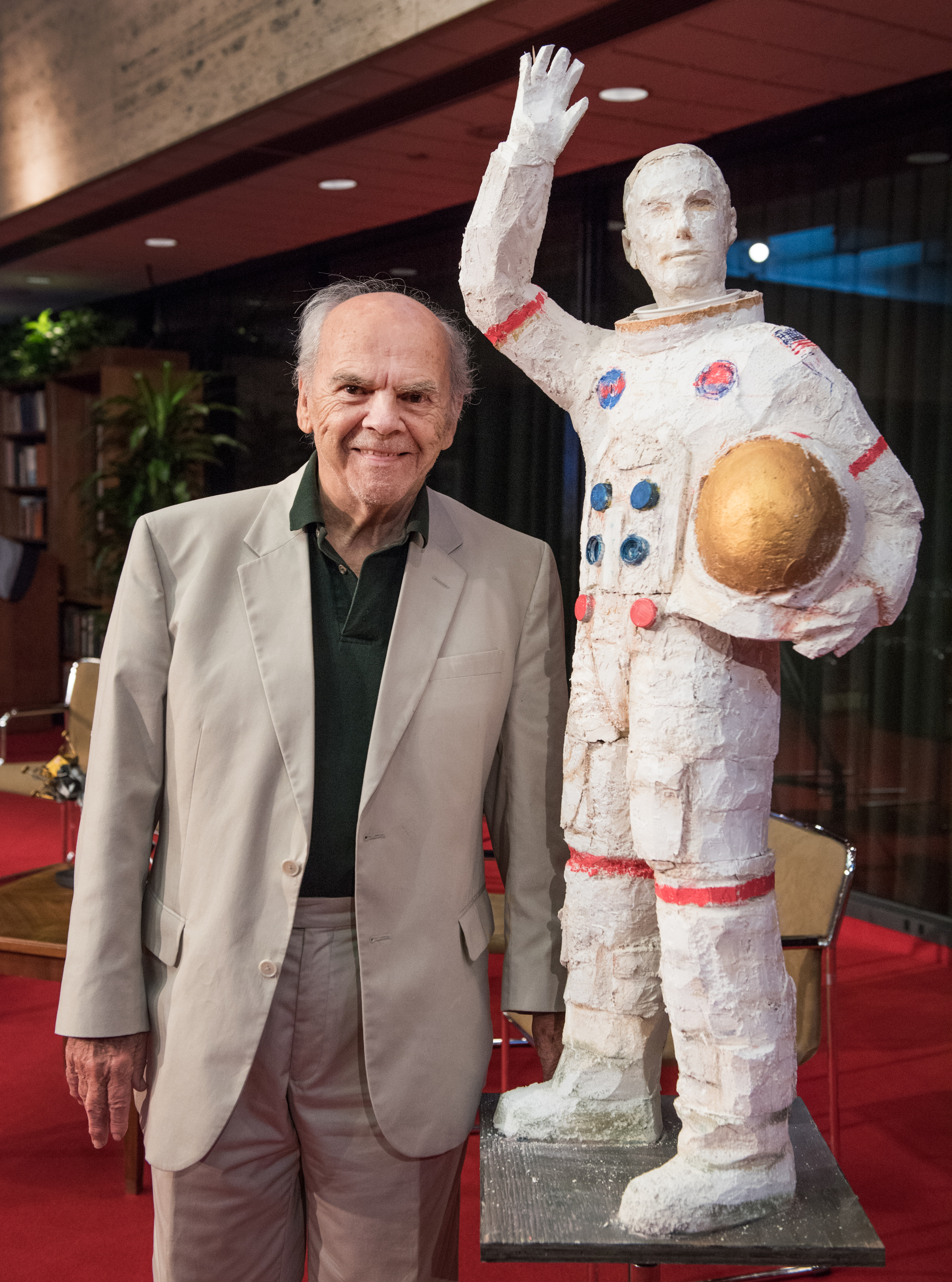
Adickes at the LBJ Presidential Library in 2015

Adickes was born in Huntsville, Texas, on January 19, 1927.

In 1949, Adickes travelled to France to study under Fernand Léger. After two years, he returned to Texas and began presenting his work. In 1955, Adickes was commissioned to paint a large historical mural of the city of Houston for the then-new Houston Club. That fall, he was hired to teach in the Art Department of the University of Texas at Austin.

In 1983, after being a fulltime painter and art instructor for more than two decades, Adickes was commissioned to make his first monumental sculpture. He created the Virtuoso, a 36-foot (11 m) steel and concrete statue of a string trio. It is displayed in Houston. In 1986, he created Cornet as a stage prop for the New Orleans World Fair. In 1994, he created A Tribute to Courage in memory of Houston's namesake, Sam Houston. In 2004, he created 43 large busts of American presidents at Presidents Park, Virginia. In 2006, he erected 60-foot (18 m) statue of Stephen F. Austin in Brazoria County, Texas. The busts installed at Houston's American Statesmanship Park were created in 2008 and donated to Harris County in 2012. In 2012, he turned his old high school in Huntsville into the Adickes Art Foundation Museum.

Adickes died on July 13, 2025, at the age of 98.

== Museum collections ==
- Art Museum of Southeast Texas, Beaumont, Texas
