= American Statesmanship Park =

Park in Houston, Texas, U.S.

- The art installation A Tribute to American Statesmanship by David Adickes, 2024
- Interactive map of American Statesmanship Park
- Location: Houston, Texas, U.S.
- Coordinates: 29°46′17″N 95°22′1″W

American Statesmanship Park, also known as "Mount Rush Hour", is a park in Houston, Texas. Located at the intersection of Interstate 10 and Interstate 45, the park has a series of four 18-foot, two-ton busts depicting Stephen F. Austin, Sam Houston, Abraham Lincoln, and George Washington. The sculptures, known as A Tribute to American Statesmanship, were created in 2008 and donated to Harris County in November 2012 by artist David Adickes.
