= Cornet (sculpture) =

1986 sculpture by David Adickes in Galveston, Texas, U.S.

- Artist: David Adickes
- Year: 1986
- Type: Sculpture
- Medium: Concrete; steel
- Subject: Cornet
- Dimensions: 6.1 m × 7.9 m (20 ft × 26 ft)
- Location: Galveston, Texas, United States; 29.3069°N 94.7941°W

Cornet is an outdoor concrete and steel sculpture of a cornet by David Adickes, located in the Strand Historic District of Galveston, Texas, in the United States. Modeled after a cornet purchased at an antique shop in New Orleans, the 20 feet (6.1 m) by 26 feet (7.9 m) replica originally served as a stage prop at the 1984 Louisiana World Exposition. Adickes converted the prop into a freestanding sculpture for installation in Galveston in 1986.

== Description and history ==
Cornet, designed by Native Texan artist David Adickes, is located at 23rd Street and The Strand in Galveston's Strand Historic District. Before being converted into a freestanding sculpture and installed in Galveston in 1986, the cornet served as a stage prop at the 1984 Louisiana World Exposition. Adickes' model was a "turn-of-the-century-style" cornet purchased an at antique shop in New Orleans. The sculpture is made of white concrete over a steel frame and measures 20 feet (6.1 m) by 26 feet (7.9 m). It features keys, a mouthpiece and spigots, and is mounted on two metal poles. Cornet was surveyed by the Smithsonian Institution's Save Outdoor Sculpture! program in 1993.

== See also ==
- 1986 in art
