= Child star =

Child star may refer to:

- Child actor
- Child model
- "Child Star", a song by The Unicorns from their 2003 album Who Will Cut Our Hair When We're Gone?
- "Child Star", a song by Tyrannosaurus Rex from their 1968 album My People Were Fair and Had Sky in Their Hair... But Now They're Content to Wear Stars on Their Brows
- Child Star, the autobiography of Shirley Temple (1928 – 2014)
- "Child Star" (Glee), an episode of the TV series
- "Child Star" (Cow and Chicken), an episode of the TV series
- Childstar, is a 2004 comedy film
- The Child Star, a 2011 album by Nathaniel Motte with Awol One
- Child Star, a 2024 documentary film directed by Demi Lovato and Nicola Marsh

== See also ==
- Dickie Roberts: Former Child Star, a 2003 film
- Star-Child, a 1977 musical composition
