= The Prodigy (TV series) =

Recruiting scheme disguised as a TV show

- Country of origin: United States

Production
- Producer: Bryan Ferre

The Prodigy was an alleged proposed American reality TV show in 2007 that promised $1 million in cash and prizes to the ultimate winner, but was actually a recruiting scheme for an alarm sales company.

The show staged casting events at college campuses throughout the country in 2007. The show's creative director and producer Bryan Ferre announced that they were recruiting field camera crew from Collins College (Arizona).

Students were reportedly selected from around the country, perhaps as many as 2000. Many of the students cast in the show later claimed it was an elaborate scam by Utah-based security alarm company Firstline Security. The "show" was produced by "Actuality Entertainment", and producers promised the students it would air on a major network. Many students never saw any cameras, however. No show ever aired. Firstline subsequently went into bankruptcy, and the state of California launched an investigation of the company's practices which led to its license being revoked.
