= Prodigy Math Game =

2011 math MMORPG video game

- The loading screen that appears when a player logs into the game.
- Developers: SMARTeacher, Inc.
- Publisher: Prodigy Education, Inc
- Designers: Rohan Mahimker; Alex Peters
- Engine: Phaser
- Platform: Browser Android iOS
- Release: August 2014 (to the public) 2011-2014 (private schools)
- Genre: Massively multiplayer online role-playing game
- Modes: Single-player, Multiplayer

Prodigy Math or Prodigy Math Game is a Canadian educational fantasy massively multiplayer online role-playing game (MMORPG) developed by Prodigy Education. The player takes the role of a wizard, who, whilst undertaking quests to collect 5 gems, must battle against possessed creatures and a variety of bosses. These quests usually involve battling monsters in different areas of the in-game map. To participate in these quests, players must correctly answer math problems to gain magic and cast spells. Prodigy Math was released in August 2014, but it was originally released in 2011 to private schools in Canada.

== Development ==
The game began development as a school project by University of Waterloo engineering students Rohan Mahimker and Alex Peters. Mahimker sought to address, in part, what he saw as the lack of appeal of most educational software aimed at children. Mahimker and Peters published Prodigy initially under the label of SMARTeacher, Inc. Mahimker and Peters initially focused on utilizing biometrics and facial recognition software to personalize the educational experiences of students, but they later abandoned the focus on hardware to focus more on the in-game software.

== Gameplay ==
The original icon of Prodigy Math Game. Now, it is used by Prodigy Education, Inc., the game's parent company

Teachers can use the game to assign homework and monitor students. The game sells players items that they can use to customize their avatar, and has three "paid premium" membership levels, Core, Plus, and Ultra.

=== Battles ===
Prodigy Math integrates math exercises into its gameplay through turn-based combat battles, with the combat being through spells. To cast spells, the player has to use "Magic Points." Once all are used up, the player must answer a math or science question to refill it back up. If the opponent has low health and is not a boss, the player can rescue it as a pet.

== Plot ==
The player controls a wizard, who is the main protagonist of the game, in a place called Prodigy Island. The game initially starts with a short tutorial, where the protagonist is shown outside of a house. A fairy named Noot greets the player, telling them that they have to go to the Academy, a school where wizards are trained to cast spells.

At the Academy, the protagonist encounters a wizard named Theo Addiwise, who lends the player their old wand to use. Noot teaches them how to use magic to defeat Theo. After casting two spells, Theo goes back to class, then players encounter a set of 5 monsters to choose from to use as their first "starter" pet. Monsters, when caught and trained, can also be controlled by the player; they can cast spells and attack in battles with other wizards and/or monsters.

After the protagonist chooses a pet, they hear a strange sound. The protagonist then encounters the Puppet Master, who is the main antagonist of the game, along with his assistant, Pippet. The Puppet Master then proceeds to attempt to destroy the five Warden Keystones, but instead scatters the stones across Prodigy Island. The Keystones allow the five elemental towers (places where Wizards can learn different elements of magic) in the Academy to stay open, so as soon as the Puppet Master scatters the Keystones, the towers are locked. It is then the player's mission to travel to the five elemental subareas within Prodigy Island (Firefly Forest, Shiverchill Mountains, Bonfire Spire, Skywatch, and Shipwreck Shore) to find and earn the Warden Keystones and return them back to the Academy.

Once the player finally returns all five keystones, the Puppet Master challenges them. The player then has to fight shadow versions of the final bosses of each area, with checkpoints in between. The Puppet Master is eventually defeated, and the protagonist gets his outfit and wand.

It is later discovered that the Puppet Master lived and escaped to the Dragon Isle, starting the Dragon Isle quest.

A while later, the Puppet Master from the past time travels to the present day to celebrate his victory, only to find out that he lost the battle. He then alters the timeline, allowing the player to access Hard Mode.

== Growth and reception ==
In 2013, Mahimker claimed that the game's playerbase was growing at a monthly rate of approximately 50 per cent. By January 2021, Prodigy Math had about 100 million registered users and nine million active monthly users, its growth affected by the need for distance learning caused by the COVID-19 pandemic.

In February 2021, Fairplay, an American advocacy organization, criticized the "freemium" model of Prodigy Math, stating that the models are "manipulative" and "promote inequity". James Bigg, a spokesman for Prodigy Math Game, responded to these allegations by stating in an email interview that the game notifies players about memberships "from time to time". Furthermore, Bigg has stated that "[Prodigy Education looks at] this responsibly and sparingly so it does not detract from the free game play experience or educational quality. ... [they] do not pressure users into upgrading."
