= Prodigy Education =

Canadian educational technology company

Prodigy Education Inc.
- Logo of Prodigy Education, Inc.
- Formerly: Prodigy Game
- Industry: Educational video games
- Founded: 2011
- Founder: Alex Peters; Rohan Mahimker
- Website: ProdigyGame.com

Prodigy Education, Inc., formerly Prodigy Game, is a Canadian educational technology company focused on game-based learning. Its co-CEOs and founders are Alex Peters and Rohan Mahimker. It is the developer of the 2011 and 2022 Prodigy Math, a roleplaying game where players solve math (and later science) problems to participate in battles and cast spells, and Prodigy English, a sandbox game where players answer English questions to earn currency to gain items. Although each game is standalone, both are accessible through a single Prodigy account. The games are widely used in schools, though they have attracted criticism due to excessive in-game advertising for membership and their freemium aspects.

== Prodigy English ==
On April 21, 2022, Prodigy English was launched for grades 1 to 6. According to Prodigy Education, the new game encouraged players to "build their own online world, collecting supplies and exploring an exciting and interactive environment while learning and answering curriculum-aligned English and grammar skills."

== Criticism and controversies ==
=== Criticism of premium model ===
In February 2021, Fairplay, formerly the Campaign for a Commercial-Free Childhood, an American advocacy organization, submitted a complaint to the Federal Trade Commission regarding the premium model of Prodigy Math. The organization stated that "[while it] does cost nothing for schools to implement Prodigy, the in-school version encourages children to play at home" and that "And when children play at home, they are met with a steady stream of advertisements promoting a 'premium annual membership' that costs up to $107.40."

James Bigg, a spokesman for Prodigy Math Game, responded to these allegations by stating in a Gmail interview that the game notifies players about memberships "from time to time". Furthermore, Bigg has stated that "[Prodigy Education looks at] this responsibly and sparingly so it does not detract from the free game play experience or educational quality. ... [they] do not pressure users into upgrading."
