= Virtuoso (sculpture) =

Sculpture in Houston, Texas, U.S.

- Artist: David Adickes
- Year: 1983
- Type: Sculpture
- Medium: Steel and concrete
- Dimensions: 11 m (36 ft)
- Weight: 25 tons
- Location: Houston, Texas, United States; 29°45′46.3″N 95°21′54.4″W

Virtuoso is a 36-foot-tall, 25-ton outdoor concrete sculptural group by David Adickes. It was installed in 1983 on the outskirts of the Theater District in downtown Houston next to the Lyric Centre building. It was commissioned as a work that "paid homage to music, dance and performing arts".

== Description ==
Viewed from the intersection of Prairie and Smith Streets, the sculpture is a gigantic cello being played by a virtuoso who is invisible except for his head and hands. Behind the sculpture adjacent to the Lyric Centre, a life-sized trio of abstract musicians including a violinist, bass, and flute player accompany the giant cellist. The work is equipped with an integrated sound system that plays classical music for passing pedestrians.

== History ==
Virtuoso, the artist's favorite work, was his first large-scale sculpture to garner major public exposure. It initially was controversial with critics and many residents panning the sculpture; however, with time, it has been embraced as an iconic landmark.

In 2005, the president of the Lyric Centre's property management group ordered the giant cellist's mustache to be painted black without consulting the artist. After Adickes and others in the arts community said it overstepped its bounds in altering the artwork, the property management company provided a bucket truck and paint so that the artist could repaint the mustache white.

In 2017 using laser scanner data and nondestructive testing, the engineering firm Walter P Moore determined that the sculpture weighed 25 tons.

== See also ==
- 1983 in art
- List of public art in Houston
