= Manhunter (Kate Spencer) =

- Artwork for the cover of Manhunter (vol. 3) #4 (2005), art by Jae Lee.

Publication information
- Publisher: DC Comics
- First appearance: Manhunter (vol. 3) #1 (October 2004)
- Created by: Marc Andreyko; Jesus Saiz

In-story information
- Alter ego: Katherine Spencer
- Species: Human
- Team affiliations: FBI; DEO; Birds of Prey; Justice Society of America
- Partnerships: Green Arrow; Wonder Woman; Catwoman; Batman; Oracle; Black Canary; Huntress
- Abilities: Wears a suit that is keyed into her unique bioelectrical signature, granting her increased strength, agility, and endurance. Carries a powerful staff once used by a previous Manhunter, Mark Shaw.

Manhunter (Kate Spencer) is a superheroine appearing in American comic books published by DC Comics. She is the eighth DC Comics character to be given the name Manhunter, but was the first woman. The character first appears in Manhunter (vol. 3) #1 (October 2004) and was promoted by DC Comics as relevant to the popular Identity Crisis limited series.

Kate Spencer appeared as a recurring character on the second season of The CW Arrowverse show Arrow, portrayed by Chelah Horsdal. This version never became a vigilante and was the district attorney.

== Publication history ==
Despite critical success, the first series repeatedly had trouble gaining larger readership. DC Comics considered in May 2006 to cancel the series and issue #25 was to be the last. Dan DiDio, DC's executive editor, was convinced by fan outcry to extend the series for five additional issues in order to improve sales. The new five-issue story arc dealt with a ramification of the Infinite Crisis, again tying the series into a popular event. DiDio said at the time that the storyline would lead into another big event in the DC Universe. The series came back with issue #31 in 2008, but was cancelled with issue #38 in 2009.

Manhunter had a 10-page co-feature in Batman: Streets of Gotham which began in June 2009, and ended in issue #13, and was replaced with a Two-Face co-feature. A planned collection of the back-up series was cancelled by DC.

In addition to her solo features, writer Gail Simone made Manhunter into one of the lead characters in her Birds of Prey series as part of a controversial revamp in issue #100, where Kate was brought in to serve as a replacement for Black Canary. Manhunter remained with the team until the book's cancellation with issue #127 in 2009, and was not part of the subsequent 2010 relaunch. In 2011, Manhunter appeared in Justice Society of America series by Marc Guggenheim.

== Fictional character biography ==
Kate Spencer is a federal prosecutor who grows increasingly tired of seeing guilty criminals evade punishment. Copperhead, a supervillain on trial for multiple murders and cannibalism, avoids a death sentence and escapes from custody after killing two guards. An angry Kate takes matters into her own hands, stealing equipment from an evidence room and killing Copperhead. Calling herself Manhunter, Kate blackmails a former weapons manufacturer for numerous villains named Dylan Battles — who is in the Witness Protection Program — into building, maintaining and upgrading her armor, weapons and gadgets.

In addition to legal proceedings and fighting crime, Kate's life includes awkward relationships with her six-year-old son Ramsey and novelist ex-husband. Kate's secret life as Manhunter cuts into her career and family life, but her co-counsel Damon Matthews covers for her. Kate's father Walter Pratt spent time in prison for murdering her mother, and she comes to believe that her grandfather is superhero Al Pratt, the original Atom, a member of the Justice Society of America.

Through her friendship with Department of Extranormal Operations Agent Cameron Chase, Kate works for the DEO under the direction of Mr. Bones. During the Infinite Crisis, Oracle calls Kate, along with a number of low-powered heroes to join the Battle of Metropolis, and she was invited to join the Birds of Prey after founding member Black Canary left to join the Justice League.

=== Iron Munro ===
The June 2006 issue of Manhunter revealed that Kate's true grandfather was not the original Atom, but actually Iron Munro and that her grandmother was Sandra Knight (Phantom Lady). When Munro was apparently unwilling to deal with his girlfriend's pregnancy, she was taken by Pratt to a home for unwed mothers and Pratt was mistakenly listed as the father on Walter Pratt's birth certificate. This makes her a second cousin once removed to Jack Knight, as Phantom Lady pointed out in the issue.

=== Wonder Woman ===
Kate was hired to be Wonder Woman's defense lawyer for the murder of Maxwell Lord. The case has taken an unexpected turn however, upon the recent arrival of a supposedly alive Blue Beetle, who claims he has no memory of the last 18 months. Wonder Woman has called in Batman to run an investigation on Blue Beetle, to see if it is really him. Meanwhile, Kate received aid from Checkmate, which proved that Diana's actions were justifiable. The "Blue Beetle" turned out to be the shapeshifting cannibal Everyman from Lex Luthor's Infinity, Inc.

Following the events of Batman: RIP, Oracle disbanded the Birds of Prey. Kate was not invited to rejoin the team when it was subsequently reestablished the following year.

=== Cancellation and future ===
Since the cancellation of her ongoing series, Kate Spencer was moved to Gotham to serve as their D.A., appearing in Streets of Gotham alongside Huntress and Misfit, her fellow Birds of Prey, and Batgirl. The series was eventually cancelled, and a planned collection was axed due to low pre-orders.

Kate was recently seen being recruited by Jay Garrick for a yet unknown purpose, alongside Mon-El, Miss Martian, Mister America, and the Sea Devils. Despite her recruitment, Kate does not appear alongside the other heroes in the finale of Justice League: Cry for Justice. Following this, Manhunter briefly appears alongside Batgirl, Batwoman, the Question and a host of other female heroes when Wonder Woman leads them against Professor Ivo's robot sirens.

In 2011, Manhunter appeared in Justice Society of America. Kate makes her first appearance in issue #47, where she battles a group of gangbangers who are in the process of robbing a Gotham electronics store. After defeating the thugs, Kate sees a news report from the recently destroyed city of Monument Point, where Jay Garrick is shown telling reporters about the crime wave sweeping the remains of the city. Upon hearing about how there are not enough heroes and police officers to stem the tide of criminal activity, Kate is shown grinning, as if the statement has given her an idea. Shortly after this, Kate appears in Monument Point during a massive battle between the Justice Society and a villain named Doctor Chaos. She is shown leading a large team of superheroes including the JSA All-Stars, Jesse Quick, Liberty Belle and Red Beetle. After Chaos is defeated, Kate and the other heroes choose to stay in Monument Point and join the JSA.

=== DC Rebirth ===
Kate Spencer made her return in Green Arrow, working as Oliver Queen's attorney.

== Powers and abilities ==
=== Kate's equipment ===
When Kate pursues Copperhead, she sneaks into an evidence room to steal some items she can use against him. Manhunter #15 tells the origin of each of the three items she takes:

- The Suit comes from a member of the Darkstars who died in battle and fell to Earth to rot. A drifter found it and used it to defend himself against a group of attackers. Successfully defeating them, he robbed them and left the suit in a dumpster. The Controllers apparently programmed an instinctive hatred of Reach scarabs into the suits including the one currently worn by Kate Spencer. Her suit reacts adversely to the scarab currently bonded to Blue Beetle Jaime Reyes.
- The Gauntlets – a small-time crook found the gauntlets, originally worn by Azrael during his stint as Batman, in Gotham City. The crook used them in an unsuccessful burglary, but when the police arrived, the crook fell to his death, leaving the gauntlets embedded in the side of the building.
- The Staff – an attack on Eclipso ended with several heroes dead; among them was a man programmed to believe that he was Mark Shaw. The staff was recovered with the body and hidden in storage.

Other characters have remarked that Kate displays slightly elevated strength and resilience to injury. If these are actual metahuman powers as a result of her lineage from Iron Munro or if Kate is simply tougher than average has not been clarified.

== In other media ==
Kate Spencer appears in Arrow, portrayed by Chelah Horsdal. This version is a civilian and district attorney.

== Collected editions ==
- Manhunter (vol. 3) #1–38 (October 2004 – March 2009) collected as:
  - Manhunter Vol. 1: Street Justice (collects #1–5, December 2005, ISBN 1-4012-0728-6)
  - Manhunter Vol. 2: Trial By Fire (collects #6–14, January 2007, ISBN 1-4012-1198-4)
  - Manhunter Vol. 3: Origins (collects #15–23, August 2007, ISBN 1-4012-1340-5)
  - Manhunter Vol. 4: Unleashed (collects #24–30, January 2008, ISBN 1-4012-1632-3)
  - Manhunter Vol. 5: Forgotten (collects #31-38, May 2009, ISBN 1-4012-2158-0)
