= The Prodigies =

1897 short story by Willa Cather

- Short story by Willa Cather
- Country: United States
- Language: English
- Genre: Short story

Publication
- Published in: Home Monthly
- Publication type: Women's magazine
- Publication date: July 1897

"The Prodigies" is a short story by Willa Cather. It was first published in Home Monthly in July 1897.

== Plot summary ==
The Mackenzies are invited to the Masseys' at four in the afternoon to hear their children, Hermann and Ad, sing. Later, Mr. Mackenzie overhears the children say they wish they could join other children and play with them instead of working. He chips in and tells them they will go to a dog show with his children the next day, instead of seeing an opera as planned. During their performance, the girl collapses. One month later, Mr. Mackenzie informs Mrs. Massey that the girl's voice has been worn out. Undaunted, she prods her son to become a very successful singer.

== Characters ==
- Mrs Harriet Mackenzie, a pianist.
- Mr Nelson Mackenzie, a doctor. He plays the cornet.
- Elsie, the Mackenzies's daughter.
- Billy, the Mackenzies's son.
- Kate Massey, a pushy mother.
- Mr Massey, a businessman, Kate's husband.
- Hermann, the Masseys's son.
- Ad, the Masseys's daughter.
- Madame Marchesi, a singing teacher in Paris.
- John Hamilton, a boy with a skate.
- Mollie Hamilton, John's sister.

== Allusions to other works ==
- Literature is mentioned with Lewis Carroll's Alice in Wonderland, Pegasus, Alphonse Daudet, Daniel Defoe's Robinson Crusoe, Johann David Wyss's The Swiss Family Robinson, and John Bunyan's The Pilgrim's Progress.
- Music is mentioned with Teodor Leszetycki, Charles Gounod, Schubert, Jean de Reszke, Adelina Patti, Italo Campanini, Richard Wagner (through a relative of his, Frau Cosima Wagner), Sybil Sanderson, and Hector Berlioz's La damnation de Faust.

== Literary significance and criticism ==
- "The Prodigies" has been deemed to be Jamesian.
