= Chase (comics) =

Cameron Chase
- Artwork for the cover of Chase #4 (March 1998), art by J.H. Williams III.

Publication information
- Publisher: DC Comics
- First appearance: Batman #550 (January 1998)
- Created by: Dan Curtis Johnson (writer); J.H. Williams III (artist)

In-story information
- Alter ego: Cameron Chase
- Species: Metahuman
- Team affiliations: Department of Extranormal Operations; Suicide Squad; Global Peace Agency
- Partnerships: Batman; Batwoman; Supergirl; Manhunter (Kate Spencer); Manhunter (Mark Shaw)
- Abilities: Negates metahuman talents
Chase
- Cameron Chase on the cover of Chase #1, art by J.H. Williams III.
Publication information
- Schedule: vol. 1: Monthly
- Format: Ongoing series
- Publication date: vol. 1: February 1998 – November 1998
- No. of issues: vol. 1: 10
- Main character(s): Department of Extranormal Operations; Suicide Squad; Global Peace Agency
Creative team
- Written by: Daniel Curtis Johnson; J.H. Williams, III; Doug Moench
- Penciller(s): J.H. Williams, III; Robert P Hall; Eric Canete; Diego Barreto; Greg Scott; Yanick Paquette; Kelley Jones; Rick Burchett; Charlie Adlard
- Inker(s): John Beatty; Mick Gray; Shawn Martinbrough; Rick Burchett; Charlie Adlard
- Colorist(s): J.H. Williams, III; Gregory Wright; Tom McCraw; Digital Chameleon; Lee Loughridge; Kelley Jones

Chase is a comic book series published by DC Comics. It was written by Dan Curtis Johnson, illustrated by J.H. Williams III and inked by Mick Gray. It lasted ten issues (including a special #1,000,000 issue). The character of Cameron Chase first appeared in Batman #550 (January 1998) written by Doug Moench and drawn by Kelley Jones. The Batman appearance was used to promote the upcoming series.

The original Chase series was reprinted in graphic novel form in December 2011.

== Fictional character biography ==
The series focuses on Cameron Chase, an agent of the Department of Extranormal Operations tasked with monitoring and neutralizing metahuman threats to national security. A New York City resident and former private detective, Chase was recruited by Director Bones, head of the DEO's Northeastern division.

Doctor Trap kills the Acro-Bat.

Cameron is the eldest daughter of Walter Chase, who operated as the Acro-Bat alongside a team of altruistic, but inexperienced, heroes known as the Justice Experience. Walter was murdered by deranged ex-scientist Doctor Trap, who used his cybernetic jaws to tear his throat open.

Doctor Trap, real name Larry Trapp, lost his girlfriend Caroline Anders during a public battle between the Justice Experience and their archenemies, the House of Pain, and blamed her death on all involved. Trap set about trapping and killing the members of both teams. Trap left Acro-Bat's body on the kitchen floor of the Chase family's home, where he was found by a young Cameron. Her father's murder deeply scarred Cameron Chase and left her with a deep hatred of superbeings.

Cameron has since been assigned to a number of cases, with her most noteworthy case involving her attempts to ascertain the true identity of Batman. She also discovered the alternate lives employed by Martian Manhunter while working under Director Bones after searching for answers about the link between John Jones and Martian Manhunter.

Cameron appears as a supporting character in Manhunter alongside her friend and former college roommate, Kate Spencer, a.k.a. Manhunter. She was briefly in a relationship with Kate's blackmailed assistant, Dylan Battles. In Manhunter (vol. 3) #27 (January 2007), it is revealed that Doctor Trap is still alive and has kidnapped her sister Terry. Eventually, Cameron finds Terry tied up in a wax museum, and is brutally attacked by Trap when she tries to save her. Both Cameron and Terry are saved by Dylan Battle.

In 2011, The New 52 rebooted the DC universe. Director Bones sends Chase to Gotham City to capture Batwoman, who is being investigated by the D.E.O. for possible connections to a terrorist cell. During her investigation, she discovers that Beth Kane has been resurrected, and brings her to the D.E.O. Chase attempts to arrest Batwoman during a confrontation at the Gotham waterfront, but Batwoman escapes after breaking one of Cameron's arms.

In 2016, DC Comics implemented a relaunch of its books called DC Rebirth, which restored its continuity to a form much as it was prior to The New 52. Chase reappears as the director of the D.E.O., helping Supergirl recover her powers in exchange for the latter to collaborate with the Department and its missions.

== Powers and abilities ==
Cameron Chase can dampen the superhuman talents of any metahuman within her sphere of influence when she is threatened. This ability appears to be subconscious. Cameron is proficient in the use of a handgun, and is a skilled investigator and hacker.

== Other versions ==
- A version of Cameron Chase from the original Earth-Two appears in "Infinite Frontier". This version is a follower of Darkseid under the name X-Tract tasked with bringing individuals to Earth Omega to facilitate his plot to conquer the multiverse.
- An alternate universe version of Cameron Chase appears in Absolute Green Lantern. This version is the ex-wife of Jo Mullein.

== In other media ==
- Cameron Chase appears in the Supergirl episode "Childish Things", portrayed by Emma Caulfield. This version is an FBI agent.
- Cameron Chase appears in Smallville Season 11. This version is an Asian-American DEO agent.

== Awards ==
The 1,000,000 issue was a part of the DC One Million storyline which was a top vote getter for the Comics Buyer's Guide Fan Award for Favorite Story for 1999.
