= Manhunter (Mark Shaw) =

- Mark Shaw, as he appeared in his 1980s series.

Publication information
- Publisher: DC Comics
- First appearance: 1st Issue Special #5 (August 1975)
- Created by: Jack Kirby

In-story information
- Full name: Mark David Shaw
- Species: Human
- Team affiliations: Suicide Squad; Leviathan
- Partnerships: Manhunter; Cameron Chase; Amanda Waller; Captain Boomerang
- Notable aliases: Privateer; Star-Tsar; Dumas; Leviathan
- Abilities: Wears a suit that is keyed into his unique bioelectrical signature, granting increased strength, agility, and endurance; Regenerative healing powers; Wields staff; Expert martial artist, hand-to-hand combatant, and stick fighter; Expert strategist, field commander and tactician; Peak human physical and mental conditioning; Proficient in utilizing various high-tech equipment and weapons

Manhunter (Mark Shaw) is an antihero appearing in American comic books published by DC Comics. He is the third featured character called Manhunter.

Mark Shaw appeared in the third season of Arrow, portrayed by David Cubitt.

== Fictional character biography ==
Mark Shaw is a public defender who is angered that criminals manipulate the legal system to escape punishment. Shaw's uncle Desmond introduces him to the Manhunters, a robotic police force who go to extreme lengths to enforce justice. Shaw contacts the Grand Master, the sect's leader, and joins the Manhunters.

The Manhunters attempt to manipulate Shaw into helping them take revenge on their creators, the Guardians of the Universe. Shaw realizes that he has been manipulated and turns on the Manhunters, killing the Grand Master. Shaw returns as a new hero called the Privateer, but is imprisoned after it is uncovered that he had been operating as a villain called the Star-Tsar.

While in prison, Shaw is recruited into the Suicide Squad as Privateer in exchange for being released from prison. Following Millennium, he dons a new costume to distance himself from the Manhunter cult and had his own adventures. Shaw now hunted costumed criminals for the bounty. He kept insisting that he was just operating for the money, but he kept finding himself doing the right thing.

Shaw and his family are threatened by two shapeshifters named Dumas. Both versions of Dumas are killed in battle, leading Shaw to give up the Manhunter identity. It is later revealed that Shaw had been Dumas and that much of his history was actually the result of mental programming by the United States government.

Shaw joins the Shadow Fighters to battle the supervillain Eclipso and is apparently killed in battle. It is later revealed that he survived and had gone undercover using the Dumas identity as the behest of Sarge Steel.

In The New 52 (a 2011 reboot of the DC Comics universe), Mark Shaw appears in Forever Evil as a U.S. Marshal. He is referred to as "one of the best manhunters" in the United States Marshal Service.

=== Head of Leviathan ===
Shaw becomes the head of Leviathan, having taken control of the organization from Talia al Ghul. He makes Leviathan an advanced espionage agency with the goal of taking over Earth and bringing order. He takes on a goal of fixing the world, as he sees the constant struggle between heroes and villains, in addition to governments and their secret maneuvers, as futile.

=== Leviathan Dawn ===
Shaw forms a false alliance with the Legion of Doom, stating to Lex Luthor that Lois Lane only revealed his identity because he wanted her to. While the Justice League and Legion of Doom are busy fighting, Shaw betrays his allies, viewing people like Luthor as a part of the problem with the world. He teleports the Legion away to a far off place instead of attacking the League or civilians.

== In other media ==
Mark Shaw appears in Arrow, portrayed by David Cubitt. This version is a liaison between A.R.G.U.S. and Corto Maltese and an ally of H.I.V.E.
