= Mister Bones =

- Cover art to Manhunter #16, by Jesus Saiz.

Publication information
- Publisher: DC Comics
- First appearance: Infinity, Inc. #16 (July 1985)
- Created by: Roy Thomas; Dann Thomas; Todd McFarlane

In-story information
- Alter ego: Robert Todd
- Species: Metahuman
- Team affiliations: Global Peace Agency; Department of Extranormal Operations; Infinity, Inc. Helix; Checkmate
- Notable aliases: Director Bones
- Abilities: Superhuman strength and endurance Invisible skin and invisible internal organs Skin exudes a cyanide compound

Mister Bones (Robert Todd) is a character in the DC Comics Universe, created by Roy Thomas, Dann Thomas, and Todd McFarlane, in Infinity, Inc. #16 (July 1985). A former low-level supervillain and member of Helix, he reformed and joined the Infinity Inc. team, then later the Department of Extranormal Operations (a government agency which regulates superhero activity) as a bureaucrat, eventually rising to the rank of Regional Director for the Eastern Seaboard. Thus, he now wears a suit and tie instead of a costume, and is also known as Director Bones. A chain-smoker, he had a habit of speaking in rhyme in early appearances, but he no longer does so.

Keith David voices Mister Bones in Stargirl.

== Fictional character biography ==
=== Origin ===
Dr. Benjamin Love, a gynecologist, injected six pregnant women with an experimental mutagenic drug, with each of their children gaining metahuman powers. Love kidnaps the infants and raises them himself, never allowing them to leave the house. The children learn everything they know from books, radio, and television. Later, the six young adults learn their origin from reading Love's diary and confront him. They decide to execute him for what he did to them. When Love begs for his life, Bones takes pity on him and lets him go. After the supposed death of Love and taking their cue from the superheroes they had watched on television, the six created costumes to go with the names Love had given them and called their group Helix.

Mister Bones as depicted on the cover of Infinity, Inc. #16 (July 1985). Art by Todd McFarlane and Tony DeZuniga.

=== Working with Helix ===
The second Wildcat (Yolanda Montez) learns that she is a cousin of Helix's new member Carcharo and that they are both products of the same genetic experiments as Helix. The two teams battle to a stalemate, with Mr. Bones being arrested while the others escaped. Bones is later freed from prison by Doctor Love.

Carcharo turns on Helix and kidnaps Mr. Bones. In the ensuing struggle, Carcharo bites Bones's leg off, then dies from exposure to the cyanide in Bones's body. The members of Helix turn themselves in to the authorities to make sure that Bones gets medical care. Bones receives an artificial leg and befriends Beth Chapel (Doctor Mid-Nite), who helped him recover.

=== Working with Infinity, Inc. ===
Infinity, Inc. is given custody of Bones, while the rest of Helix would receive treatment. Bones assists Infinity, Inc. on missions, but never officially joins the team. During the wedding of Hector and Lyta Hall, Harlequin deceives Solomon Grundy into grabbing Bones's arm and using him to kill Skyman with his cyanide touch. Racked with guilt, Bones leaves Infinity, Inc. When Dr. Love gains control of Helix and orders them to kill Bones, Helix instead turns on Love, killing him.

=== Running the Department of Extranormal Operations ===
At some point after Infinity, Inc. disbands, Mr. Bones becomes the director of a branch of the Department of Extranormal Operations (D.E.O.). He has worked with the Justice Society of America a few times, to the point that Mister Terrific infiltrates the D.E.O. headquarters to tell Mr. Bones to stop harassing them.

Mister Bones remains the director of the D.E.O. following "The New 52" relaunch, which rebooted the continuity of the DC universe. Bones, mentally imbalanced, believes himself to be Jacob Kane's illegitimate son, which is later disproven. (Note: Jacob Kane, Batwoman's father, is also under this impression.) He captures Beth Kane, sister of Batwoman, and blackmails Batwoman into agreeing to uncover Batman's secret identity. Agent Asaf shoots Bones in the head after he threatens to kill Beth rather than hand her over. (Note: Bones is brain-damaged but survives.)

== Powers and abilities ==
Mister Bones is a metahuman, the result of exposure to mutagenic drugs during his mother's pregnancy. He possesses superhuman strength; transparent skin, flesh, and organs that give him a skeleton-like appearance; and toxic, cyanide-like sweat. This makes him immune to cyanide poisoning.

== In other media ==
- Mister Bones appears in Stargirl, voiced by Keith David. This version is the director of the Helix Institute for Youth Rehabilitation who later becomes inspired to form his own superhero team after meeting Courtney Whitmore.
- Mister Bones appears in Smallville Season 11: Olympus. This version was originally a member of Shadowpact during World War II before the group came into contact with Hades, who promised them eternal youth in exchange for breaking him out of his prison. After Bones failed to fulfill his side of the deal, Hades punished him by turning his skin, muscles, and organs invisible and his bones black. In the present, Bones becomes the head of the Department of Extranormal Operations, using body paint to appear normal.
