= List of Batman comics =

Printed depictions of the DC superhero

Batman #1 (spring 1940), art by Bob Kane and Jerry Robinson

Batman has been featured in many ongoing series, annuals, miniseries, maxiseries, one-shots, graphic novels, trade paperbacks and intercompany crossovers published by DC Comics. These titles have been handled or coordinated through a single editorial section at DC Comics. This list also generally includes titles that have spun off the core Batman titles to feature related characters and presents these and all other titles separated by general publication type.

== Ongoing series ==
Title	Issues	Initial cover date	Final cover date	Notes
Detective Comics	#27 – 881	May 1939	October 2011	During its run, Detective Comics varied from quarterly to monthly publication and between an anthology series and single stories. Issues #1 – 26 did not feature Batman; however, issue #26 mentions Batman for the first time in an advertisement for his introduction in the following issue. The run included a #0 issue cover dated October 1994 and a #1,000,000 issue cover dated November 1998.
Batman	#1 – 713	spring 1940	October 2011	The run included a #0 issue cover dated October 1994 and a #1,000,000 issue cover dated November 1998.
World's Finest Comics	#1 – 323	spring 1941	January 1986	The first issue was published under the indicia World's Best Comics. The main premise of the series was to be a Superman/Batman team-up series. During its run, the series varied from quarterly to monthly publication.
Star Spangled Comics	#65 – 130	February 1947	July 1952	A co-feature starring Robin was added to the anthology series with issue #65 and ran all the way to issue #130, the last issue of the series.
The Brave and the Bold	#67 – 200	August – September 1966	July 1983	Formatted as an anthology/try-out series, The Brave and the Bold became a team-up series with issue #50. With issue #67, Batman became the primary character used in the series. During its run, the series varied between monthly and bi-monthly publication.
The Joker	#1 – 9; #10	May – June 1975; September – October 1976	October – December 2019	Published bi-monthly.The Joker #10 was announced in August 1976 (and would have been cover dated November – December 1976), but it was never published. It was finally published for the first time ever in August 2019 as one of the many DC Comics Joker stories from the 1970s in The Joker: The Bronze Age Omnibus (see DC Omnibuses / Absolute editions / Batman Noir editions / Batman Unwrapped editions / DC Deluxe Editions below) and was then republished in October 2019 as an individual issue.
Batman Family	#1 – 20	September – October 1975	October – November 1978	Anthology series published bi-monthly. It was briefly merged with Detective Comics in issues #481 – 495 of that series.
Man-Bat	#1 – 2	December 1975 – January 1976	February – March 1976	Published bi-monthly.
Batman and the Outsiders	#1 – 32	August 1983	April 1986	The series continued, but was retitled The Adventures of the Outsiders with issue #33.
The Outsiders	#1 – 28	November 1985	February 1988	
The Adventures of the Outsiders	#33 – 46	May 1986	June 1987	The series picked up from Batman and the Outsiders #32. It began reprinting The Outsiders with issue #39.
The Huntress	#1 – 19	April 1989	October 1990	
Legends of the Dark Knight	#1 – 36	November 1989	late August 1992	The series continued, but was retitled Batman: Legends of the Dark Knight with issue #37. During its run, the series varied between bi-weekly and monthly publication.
Batman: Shadow of the Bat	#1 – 94	June 1992	February 2000	The run included a #0 issue cover dated October 1994 and a #1,000,000 issue cover dated November 1998.
Batman: Legends of the Dark Knight	#37 – 214	September 1992	March 2007	The series picked up from Legends of the Dark Knight #36. The run included a #0 issue cover dated October 1994.
The Batman Adventures	#1 – 36	October 1992	October 1995	Based on the animated television series Batman: The Animated Series.
Catwoman (vol. 2)	#1 – 94	August 1993	July 2001	The run included a #0 issue dated October 1994.
Outsiders (vol. 2)	#1 – 24	November 1993	November 1995	The run totaled 26 issues, with issue #1 being printed as two issues numbered "#1α" and "#1Ω" cover dated November 1993, and included a #0 issue cover dated October 1994.
Robin (vol. 4)	#1 – 183	November 1993	April 2009	The run included a #0 issue dated October 1994 and a #1,000,000 issue dated November 1998.
Azrael	#1 – 46	February 1995	May 2003	The run included a #1,000,000 issue cover dated November 1998. The series was retitled and continued as Azrael: Agent of the Bat with issue #47.
The Batman Chronicles	#1 – 23	July 1995	winter 2001	Published quarterly.
Batman & Robin Adventures	#1 – 25	October 1995	December 1997	Based on the animated television series The Adventures of Batman & Robin.
Nightwing (vol. 2)	#1 – 153	October 1996	April 2009	The run included a #1/2 issue and a #1,000,000 issue both cover dated November 1998.
Batman: Gotham Adventures	#1 – 60	June 1998	May 2003	Based on the animated television series Batman: The Animated Series.
Azrael: Agent of the Bat	#47 – 100	December 1998	May 2003	The series picked up from Azrael #46.
Birds of Prey	#1 – 127	January 1999	April 2009	
Anarky (vol. 2)	#1 – 8	March 1999	October 1999	At the time of the series' cancellation, two more issues (which would have been issues #9 – 10) had been written and illustrated, but remain unpublished to this day.
Batman Beyond (vol. 2)	#1 – 24	November 1999	October 2001	Based on the animated television series Batman Beyond.
Batman: Gotham Knights	#1 – 74	March 2000	February 2006	Issues #1 – 49 contained a Batman Black and White co-feature. These 49 stories were then published in book form in Batman Black and White Vol. 2 and Batman Black and White Vol. 3, along with five new black-and-white Batman stories published for the first time ever (see Miscellaneous collections below).
Batgirl	#1 – 73	April 2000	April 2006	
Harley Quinn	#1 – 38	December 2000	January 2004	
Catwoman (vol. 3)	#1 – 82; #83	January 2002; October 2008	March 2010	Published under the Blackest Night trade dress.
Gotham Central	#1 – 40	February 2003	April 2006	
The Batman Adventures (vol. 2)	#1 – 17	June 2003	October 2004	Based on the animated television series Batman: The Animated Series.
Outsiders (vol. 3)	#1 – 50	August 2003	November 2007	
Superman/Batman	#1 – 87	October 2003	October 2011	
The Batman Strikes!	#1 – 50	November 2004	December 2008	Based on the animated television series The Batman.
Batman Confidential	#1 – 54	December 2006	May 2011	
Batman and the Outsiders (vol. 2)	#1 – 14; #40	December 2007; February 2009	July 2011	The series continued, but was retitled The Outsiders (vol. 4) with issue #15. The last issue of the series (issue #40) has been solicited as having changed back to this title.
Batman: The Brave and the Bold	#1 – 22	March 2009	December 2010	Based on the animated television series Batman: The Brave and the Bold.
The Outsiders (vol. 4)	#15 – 39	April 2009	June 2011	The series picked up from Batman and the Outsiders (vol. 2) #14. The title was changed back to the original one with issue #40, the last issue of the series (see above).
Batman: Streets of Gotham	#1 – 21	August 2009	May 2011	
Batman and Robin	#1 – 26	August 2009	October 2011	
Gotham City Sirens	#1 – 26	August 2009	October 2011	
Red Robin	#1 – 26	August 2009	October 2011	
Batgirl (vol. 3)	#1 – 24	August 2009	October 2011	
Azrael (vol. 2)	#1 – 18	December 2009	May 2011	
Birds of Prey (vol. 2)	#1 – 15	July 2010	October 2011	
Batman: The Dark Knight	#1 – 5	January 2011	October 2011	
Batman Incorporated	#1 – 8	January 2011	October 2011	Continued - and concluded - in Batman Incorporated: Leviathan Strikes! #1 (February 2012) (see One-shots and graphic novels below).
The All New Batman: The Brave and the Bold	#1 – 16	January 2011	February 2012	Based on the animated television series Batman: The Brave and the Bold.
Batman: The Dark Knight (vol. 2)	#1 – 29	November 2011	March 2014	
Batman and Robin (vol. 2)	#1 – 40	November 2011	February 2015	
Batwing	#1 – 34	November 2011	August 2014	
Batwoman (vol. 2)	#1 – 40	November 2011	May 2015	In September 2012, Batwoman (vol. 2) #0 was published as part of the DC Comics crossover event Zero Month. This issue is not to be confused with Batwoman #0 (January 2011) which made up vol. 1 of Batwoman all by itself (see One-shots and graphic novels below). The run included a Futures End #1 issue cover dated November 2014.
Birds of Prey (vol. 3)	#1 – 34	November 2011	August 2014	
Catwoman (vol. 4)	#1 – 52	November 2011	July 2016	
Batgirl (vol. 4)	#1 – 52	November 2011	July 2016	The run included a Futures End #1 issue cover dated November 2014.
Batman (vol. 2)	#1 – 52	November 2011	July 2016	
Detective Comics (vol. 2)	#1 – 52	November 2011	July 2016	
Nightwing (vol. 3)	#1 – 30	November 2011	April 2014	
Red Hood and the Outlaws	#1 – 40	November 2011	May 2015	
Batman: Arkham Unhinged	#1 – 58	April 2012	January 2014	Based on the online video game Batman: Arkham City. A print edition of the weekly web comic of the same title, which began in October 2011.
Batman Beyond Unlimited	#1 – 18	April 2012	September 2013	Based on the animated television series Batman Beyond. A print edition of the weekly web comic of the same title, which began in February 2012. Issues #1 and 2 were both printed with an A and B cover.
Batman, Incorporated (vol. 2)	#1 – 13	May 2012	July 2013	The run included a #0 issue dated September 2012.
Worlds' Finest	#1 – 32	July 2012	May 2015	The run included a #0 issue cover dated November 2012 and a Futures End #1 issue cover dated November 2014.
Talon	#1 – 17	September 2012	March 2014	
Legends of the Dark Knight (vol. 2)	#1 – 13	December 2012	December 2013	A print edition of the weekly web comic of the same title, which began in June 2012.
Batman: Li'l Gotham	#1 – 12	June 2013	May 2014	
Batman '66	#1 – 30	July 2013	December 2015	Based on the 1960s TV series. A print edition of the weekly web comic of the same title, which began in July 2013.
Batman Beyond Universe	#1 – 16	October 2013	January 2015	Based on the animated television series Batman Beyond. A print edition of the weekly web comic originally titled Batman Beyond 2.0, which began in August 2013. Issue #1 was printed with an A and B cover.
Harley Quinn (vol. 2)	#1 – 31	November 2013	September 2016	
Grayson	#1 – 20	July 2014	July 2016	The run included a Futures End #1 issue cover dated November 2014.
Batman/Superman	#1 – 33	August 2014	May 2016	
Batman Eternal	#1 – 52	April 2014	April 2015	
Gotham Academy	#1 – 18	October 2014	May 2016	
Gotham by Midnight	#1 – 12	November 2014	December 2015	
Arkham Manor	#1 – 6	October 2014	March 2015	
Batman Beyond (vol. 5)	#1 – 16	August 2015	November 2016	Based on the animated television series Batman Beyond.
Red Hood/Arsenal	#1 – 13	June 2015	August 2016	
Robin: Son of Batman	#1 – 13	June 2015	August 2016	
We Are... Robin	#1 – 12	June 2015	July 2016	
Batman and Robin Eternal	#1 – 26	October 2015	April 2016	
Batman (vol. 3)	#1 – 163	June 2016	May 2026	
Detective Comics	#934 – present	June 2016		Resumed the classic numbering. With 881 Pre-Flashpoint issues and 52 issues in The New 52, it brought the total to 933 issues. So, with the beginning of DC Rebirth, the first new Detective Comics issue was #934.
Batgirl (vol. 5)	#1 – 50	July 2016	October 2020	
All-Star Batman	#1 – 14	August 2016	October 2017	
Batgirl and the Birds of Prey	#1 – 22	August 2016	May 2018	
Nightwing (vol. 4)	#1 – present	September 2016		
Harley Quinn (vol. 3)	#1 – 75	October 2016	October 2020	
Red Hood and the Outlaws (vol. 2)	#1 – 26	October 2016	November 2018	The series continued, but was retitled Red Hood: Outlaw with issue #27 (see below).
Batman Beyond (vol. 6)	#1 – 50	December 2016	February 2021	Based on the animated television series Batman Beyond.
Batwoman (vol. 3)	#1 – 18	March 2017	October 2018	
Catwoman (vol. 5)	#1 – present	July 2018		
Batman 100-Page Giant	#1 – 14	August 2018	October 2019	This was a Walmart-exclusive series. Each issue of this series featured one original story, with the other stories being reprints from previously published Batman and Batman-related comic book series. The series continued in Batman 100-Page Giant (vol. 2) (see below).
Red Hood: Outlaw	#27 – 50	December 2018	December 2020	The series picked up from Red Hood and the Outlaws #26. It was retitled Red Hood for its last two issues (see below).
Batman and the Outsiders (vol. 3)	#1 – 17	July 2019	December 2020	
Batman/Superman (vol. 2)	#1 – 22	October 2019	November 2021	
Batman 100-Page Giant (vol. 2)	#1 – 5	November 2019	July 2020	This was a Walmart-first series, but it was also available in comic book stores as well. This time, each issue of this series featured two original stories, but the other stories were still reprints from previously published Batman and Batman-related comic book series.
Red Hood	#51 – 52	January 2021	February 2021	These two issues were the last issues of the Red Hood: Outlaw series.
Batman: Urban Legends	#1 – 23	May 2021	March 2023	
Harley Quinn (vol. 4)	#1 – present	May 2021		
The Joker (vol. 2)	#1 – 15	May 2021	September 2022	The series continued, but was retitled The Joker: The Man Who Stopped Laughing and restarted at issue #1 (see below).
Robin (vol. 5)	#1 – 17	June 2021	October 2022	
I Am Batman	#0 – 18	October 2021	April 2023	
Batgirls	#1 – 19	February 2022	August 2023	
Batman/Superman: World's Finest	#1 – present	May 2022		
Batman Incorporated (vol. 3)	#1 – 13	December 2022	November 2023	
Poison Ivy	#1 – present	August 2022		
Tim Drake: Robin	#1 – 10	November 2022	August 2023	
The Joker: The Man Who Stopped Laughing	#1 – 12	December 2022	January 2024	The series picked up from The Joker (vol. 2) #15 (see above).
Batman: The Brave And The Bold (vol. 2)	#1 – 20	July 2023	February 2025	
Batman and Robin (vol. 3)	#1 – 30	September 2023	February 2026	
The Penguin	#0 – 12	October 2023	November 2024	
Birds Of Prey (vol. 5)	#1 – 28	November 2023	December 2025	
Outsiders (vol. 5)	#1 – 11	January 2024	November 2024	
The Batman & Scooby-Doo Mysteries (vol. 3)	#1 – 12	February 2024	February 2025	
Absolute Batman	#1 – present	December 2024		The first title of the Absolute Universe imprint.
Batgirl (vol. 6)	#1 – present	January 2025		
Batman (vol. 4)	#1 – presnt	September 2025		
Batwoman (vol. 4)	#1 – present	May 2026		
Barbara Gordon: Breakout	#1 – present	July 2026		
Gangs of Gotham	#1 – present	November 2026		

== Annuals ==
Title	Issues	Initial cover date	Final cover date	Notes
Batman Annual	#1 – 7; #8 – 24; #25 – 28	summer 1961; 1982; 2006	summer 1964; October 2000; 2011	From mid-1961 to mid-1964, Batman Annual was published semi-annually. The title was brought back in 1982 continuing the original numbering and returned to annual publication from 1985 to 2000. It was brought back again in 2006 and shifted to bi-annual publication starting in 2007.
Batman and the Outsiders Annual	#1 – 2	1984	1985	
The Outsiders Annual	#1	1986		
Detective Comics Annual	#1 – 12	1988	February 2011	From 1988 to 1997, Detective Comics Annual was published regularly. Two more issues were later published sporadically in both 2009 and 2011.
Legends of the Dark Knight Annual	#1 – 2	1991	1992	The series continued, but was retitled Batman: Legends of the Dark Knight Annual with issue #3.
Robin Annual	#1 – 7	September 1992	December 2007	There is a 10-year gap between issues #6 and 7.
Batman: Legends of the Dark Knight Annual	#3 – 7	1993	1997	The series picked up from Legends of the Dark Knight Annual #2.
Batman: Shadow of the Bat Annual	#1 – 5	1993	September 1997	
The Batman Adventures Annual	#1 – 2	1994	1995	Based on the animated television series Batman: The Animated Series.
Catwoman Annual	#1 – 4	1994	1997	
Azrael Annual	#1 – 3	1995	1997	
Batman & Robin Adventures Annual	#1 – 2	1996	1997	Based on the animated television series The Adventures of Batman & Robin.
Nightwing Annual	#1 – 2	1997	2007	There is a 10-year gap between these two issues.
Batgirl Annual	#1	2000		
Superman/Batman Annual	#1 – 5	2006	2011	
The Outsiders Annual (vol. 2)	#1	2007		
Batman Annual (vol. 2)	#1 – 4	July 2012	November 2015	
Detective Comics Annual (vol. 2)	#1 – 3	October 2012	September 2014	
Batgirl Annual (vol. 2)	#1 – 3	December 2012	September 2015	
Batman and Robin Annual	#1 – 3	January 2013	April 2015	
Batman: The Dark Knight Annual	#1	May 2013		
Catwoman Annual (vol. 2)	#1	July 2013		
Nightwing Annual (vol. 2)	#1	December 2013		
Worlds' Finest Annual	#1	March 2014		
Batman/Superman Annual	#1	May 2014		
Harley Quinn Annual	#1	October 2014		
Batwoman Annual	#1 – 2	June 2014	June 2015	
Grayson Annual	#1 – 3	February 2015	August 2016	
Batman Annual (vol. 3)	#1 – 5	January 2017	December 2020	
Batgirl Annual (vol. 3)	#1 – 2	March 2017	August 2018	
Red Hood and the Outlaws Annual	#1 – 2	August 2017	October 2018	The series continued, but was retitled Red Hood: Outlaw Annual with issue #3.
Detective Comics Annual (vol. 3)	#1 – 3	March 2018	January 2020	
Catwoman Annual (vol. 3)	#1	July 2019		
Red Hood: Outlaw Annual	#3	September 2019		The series picked up from Red Hood and the Outlaws Annual #2. This was the last issue of the series.
Catwoman 2021 Annual		August 2021		This issue takes place between Catwoman (vol. 5) #32 and 33.
Harley Quinn 2021 Annual		October 2021		This issue takes place between Harley Quinn (vol. 4) #6 and 7.
Detective Comics 2021 Annual		January 2022		
Batman 2021 Annual		January 2022		
The Joker 2021 Annual		January 2022		This issue takes place between The Joker (vol. 2) #9 and 10. This was the first, last and only issue of the series.
Batman 2022 Annual		July 2022		
Harley Quinn 2022 Annual		October 2022		This issue takes place between Harley Quinn (vol. 4) #21 and 22.
Detective Comics 2022 Annual		January 2023		
Batgirls 2022 Annual		January 2023		This issue takes place between Batgirls #12 and 13.

== Miniseries ==
Title	Issues	Initial cover date	Final cover date	Notes
The Untold Legend of the Batman	#1 – 3	July 1980	September 1980	The first Batman miniseries of them all, telling the official origins of both the Batman of the Pre-Crisis universe of Earth-One and his cast of characters.
Shadow of the Batman	#1 – 5	December 1985	April 1986	Reprinted from Detective Comics #469 – 476 and 478 – 479. The first official reprinting of this story arc until the later release of the trade paperback Batman: Strange Apparitions (see Miscellaneous collections below).
Batman: The Dark Knight Returns	#1 – 4	February 1986	June 1986	
Batman: The Cult	#1 – 4	August 1988	November 1988	
Catwoman	#1 – 4	February 1989	May 1989	
Superman and Batman: World's Finest (vol. 2)	#1 – 3	August 1990	October 1990	
Robin	#1 – 5	January 1991	May 1991	
Robin II: The Joker's Wild!	#1 – 4	December 1991	February 1992	Published bi-weekly.
Batman: Run, Riddler, Run	#1 – 3	March 1992	August 1992	
Batman: Gotham Nights	#1 – 4	March 1992	June 1992	
Batman: Sword of Azrael	#1 – 4	October 1992	January 1993	
Robin 3000	#1 – 2	January 1993	February 1993	
Robin III: Cry of the Huntress	#1 – 6	December 1992	March 1993	Published bi-weekly.
Batman: Two-Face Strikes Twice!	#1 – 2	December 1993	January 1994	Published as a two-issue flip comic book miniseries containing a series of two two-part stories, with the second story's two parts printed upside down on the back of each issue. The two stories were each done by two different creative teams.
Legends of the World's Finest	#1 – 3	February 1994	April 1994	
Huntress (vol. 2)	#1 – 4	April 1994	September 1994	
Batman: Gotham Nights II	#1 – 4	March 1995	June 1995	
Batman: Legends of the Dark Knight - Jazz	#1 – 3	April 1995	June 1995	
Nightwing	#1 – 4	September 1995	December 1995	
Batman: Manbat	#1 – 3	October 1995	December 1995	Published under the Elseworlds logo.
Batman: The Ultimate Evil	#1 – 2	December 1995	December 1995	Published bi-weekly. The comic book adaptation of the 1995 novel of the same name by Andrew Vachss.
Man-Bat (vol. 2)	#1 – 3	February 1996	April 1996	
Batman Black and White	#1 – 4	June 1996	September 1996	
Batman: GCPD	#1 – 4	August 1996	November 1996	
Birds of Prey: Manhunt	#1 – 4	September 1996	December 1996	
Batman: Gordon's Law	#1 – 4	December 1996	March 1997	
Batman: The Long Halloween	#1 – 13	December 1996	December 1997	
Robin Plus/Impulse and Robin Plus/Fang	#1 – 2	December 1996	December 1997	
Superboy/Robin: World's Finest Three	#1 – 2	December 1996	January 1997	
Batgirl and Robin: Thrillkiller	#1 – 3	January 1997	March 1997	Published under the Elseworlds logo. Continued - and concluded - in Batgirl and Batman: Thrillkiller '62 (February 1998), another Elseworlds story (see One-shots and graphic novels below).
Batman/Wildcat	#1 – 3	April 1997	June 1997	
Anarky	#1 – 4	March 1997	June 1997	
Elseworld's Finest	#1 – 2	October 1997	November 1997	Published under the Elseworlds logo.
The Batman Adventures: The Lost Years	#1 – 5	January 1998	May 1998	Based on the animated television series Batman: The Animated Series.
Batman: Bane of the Demon	#1 – 4	March 1998	June 1998	
Nightwing/Huntress	#1 – 4	May 1998	August 1998	
Batman: Gordon of Gotham	#1 – 4	June 1998	September 1998	
Batman 80-Page Giant	#1 – 3	August 1998	July 2000	Published annually.
Catwoman/Wildcat	#1 – 4	August 1998	November 1998	
Batman: Toyman	#1 – 4	November 1998	February 1999	
Batman: Dark Knight of the Round Table	#1 – 2	December 1998	January 1999	Published under the Elseworlds logo.
Superman & Batman: Generations	#1 – 4	January 1999	April 1999	Published under the Elseworlds logo.
Batman: No Man's Land and Batman: No Man's Land - Ground Zero	#1 – 0	March 1999	December 1999	There is an eight-month gap between these two issues. The reversed numbering is intentional.
Batman Beyond	#1 – 6	March 1999	August 1999	Based on the animated television series Batman Beyond.
Batman and Superman: World's Finest (vol. 3)	#1 – 10	April 1999	January 2000	
Batman: Book of the Dead	#1 – 2	June 1999	July 1999	Published under the Elseworlds logo.
Catwoman: Guardian of Gotham	#1 – 2	August 1999	September 1999	
Batman: Dark Victory	#0 – 13	December 1999	December 2000	
Batman: Haunted Gotham	#1 – 4	February 2000	May 2000	
Batman: It's Joker Time!	#1 – 3	July 2000	September 2000	
Batman/Huntress: Cry For Blood	#1 – 6	June 2000	November 2000	
Batman: Outlaws	#1 – 3	September 2000	November 2000	
Robin: Year One	#1 – 4	December 2000	April 2001	
Batman: The Doom That Came To Gotham	#1 – 3	November 2000	January 2001	Published under the Elseworlds logo.
Batman: Turning Points	#1 – 5	January 2001	January 2001	Published weekly.
Batman: Hollywood Knight	#1 – 3	April 2001	June 2001	Published under the Elseworlds logo.
Batman: League of Batmen	#1 – 2	April 2001	May 2001	Published under the Elseworlds logo. The third (and final) part of a three-part DC Comics story line unofficially connected to the graphic novel Batman: Son of the Demon (1987), a non-Elseworlds story. Preceded by Batman: KnightGallery (October 1995) and Batman: Brotherhood of the Bat (November 1995), two more Elseworlds stories (for all three stories, see One-shots and graphic novels below).
Superman & Batman: Generations II	#1 – 4	August 2001	November 2001	Published under the Elseworlds logo.
Batman: Orpheus Rising	#1 – 5	October 2001	February 2002	
Batman: The Ankh	#1 – 2	November 2001	December 2001	
Batman: The Dark Knight Strikes Again	#1 – 3	December 2001	July 2002	
Joker: Last Laugh	#1 – 6	December 2001	January 2002	Published weekly as the spine of a company-wide crossover event.
Gotham Girls	#1 – 5	October 2002	February 2003	
Batman: Family	#1 – 8	December 2002	February 2003	Published weekly.
Batgirl: Year One	#1 – 9	February 2003	October 2003	
Superman & Batman: Generations III	#1 – 12	March 2003	February 2004	Published under the Elseworlds logo.
Batman: Nevermore	#1 – 5	June 2003	October 2003	Published under the Elseworlds logo.
Arkham Asylum: Living Hell	#1 – 6	July 2003	December 2003	ISBN 978-1-4012-0193-7
Batman/Superman/Wonder Woman: Trinity	#1 – 3	August 2003	October 2003	
Batman: Death and the Maidens	#1 – 9	October 2003	August 2004	
Batman: Tenses	#1 – 2	October 2003	November 2003	
Batman: City of Light	#1 – 8	December 2003	July 2004	
Batman: Harley and Ivy	#1 – 3	June 2004	August 2004	
Batman/Catwoman: Trail of the Gun	#1 – 2	August 2004	September 2004	
Catwoman: When in Rome	#1 – 6	November 2004	August 2005	
Batman: Jekyll & Hyde	#1 – 6	June 2005	November 2005	
Batman/Ra's al Ghul: Year One	#1 – 2	June 2005	July 2005	
Batman: Dark Detective	#1 – 6	early July 2005	late September 2005	Published bi-weekly. The sequel to the story arc originally published in Detective Comics #469 – 479 (later republished as a five-issue miniseries titled Shadow of the Batman (see above) and then again later collected into a trade paperback titled Batman: Strange Apparitions (see Miscellaneous collections below)). A second sequel miniseries was planned, which would have possibly been the end of a trilogy, but it was never finished or published due to main artist Marshall Rogers' death on March 25, 2007.
Batman/Scarecrow: Year One	#1 – 2	July 2005	August 2005	
All Star Batman & Robin the Boy Wonder	#1 – 10	July 2005	September 2008	Originally intended to be a 12-issue monthly series. The last two issues remain unpublished to this day.
Batman: Journey into Knight	#1 – 12	October 2005	November 2006	
Batman: Gotham County Line	#1 – 3	December 2005	February 2006	
Dark Moon Rising: Batman and the Monster Men	#1 – 6	January 2006	June 2006	
Batman: Year 100	#1 – 4	April 2006	July 2006	
Batman: Secrets	#1 – 5	May 2006	September 2006	
Man-Bat (vol. 3)	#1 – 5	June 2006	October 2006	
Dark Moon Rising: Batman and the Mad Monk	#1 – 6	October 2006	February 2007	
Batman/Lobo: Deadly Serious	#1 – 2	October 2007	November 2007	
Gotham Underground	#1 – 9	December 2007	August 2008	
Batman: Death Mask	#1 – 4	June 2008	September 2008	
Batman: Gotham After Midnight	#1 – 12	July 2008	June 2009	
Huntress: Year One	#1 – 6	early July 2008	late September 2008	Published bi-weekly.
Batgirl (vol. 2)	#1 – 6	September 2008	February 2009	
Superman & Batman vs. Vampires & Werewolves	#1 – 6	early December 2008	late February 2009	Published bi-weekly.
Batman: Cacophony	#1 – 3	January 2009	March 2009	Continued in Batman: The Widening Gyre #1 – 6 (see below).
Batman: Battle for the Cowl	#1 – 3	May 2009	July 2009	Published under the Battle for the Cowl trade dress.
Azrael: Death's Dark Knight	#1 – 3	May 2009	July 2009	Published under the Battle for the Cowl trade dress.
Oracle: The Cure	#1 – 3	May 2009	July 2009	Published under the Battle for the Cowl trade dress.
Batman: The Widening Gyre	#1 – 6	October 2009	September 2010	Preceded by Batman: Cacophony #1 – 3 (see above) and originally intended to be concluded in six more issues (#7 – 12), which were then going to be made into a second six-issue miniseries titled Batman: Bellicosity, but in spite of whichever version might have been released, the conclusion of this story line remains unpublished to this day.
Blackest Night: Batman	#1 – 3	October 2009	December 2009	
Arkham Reborn	#1 – 3	December 2009	February 2010	
Batman: Unseen	#1 – 5	early December 2009	February 2010	Published bi-weekly.
World's Finest (vol. 4)	#1 – 4	December 2009	March 2010	
Batman: The Return of Bruce Wayne	#1 – 6	July 2010	December 2010	
Red Hood: The Lost Days	#1 – 6	August 2010	January 2011	
Batman Beyond (vol. 3)	#1 – 6	August 2010	January 2011	Based on the animated television series Batman Beyond.
Batman: Odyssey	#1 – 6	September 2010	February 2011	This miniseries was continued in Batman: Odyssey (vol. 2) #1 – 7 (December 2011 – June 2012) (see below) and was the first half of the story.
DC Comics Presents: Batman	#1 – 3	October 2010	December 2010	Issue #1 reprinted Batman #582 – 585 (October 2000 – January 2001), issue #2 reprinted Batman #591 – 594 (July – October 2001) and issue #3 reprinted Batman #595 – 598 (November 2001 – February 2002).
Batman: Orphans	#1 – 2	early February 2011	late February 2011	Published bi-weekly.
Batman Beyond (vol. 4)	#1 – 8	March 2011	October 2011	Based on the animated television series Batman Beyond.
Batman: Arkham City	#1 – 5	early July 2011	October 2011	Published bi-weekly. Based on the video game Batman: Arkham City.
Batman: Gates of Gotham	#1 – 5	July 2011	late October 2011	
Flashpoint - Batman: Knight of Vengeance	#1 – 3	August 2011	October 2011	
Batman: Odyssey (vol. 2)	#1 – 7	December 2011	June 2012	This miniseries picked up where Batman: Odyssey #1 – 6 (September 2010 – February 2011) (see above) left off and was the second half of the story.
Huntress (vol. 3)	#1 – 6	October 2011	March 2012	
Penguin: Pain and Prejudice	#1 – 5	October 2011	February 2012	
Damian: Son of Batman	#1 – 4	October 2013	January 2014	
Beware The Batman	#1 – 6	October 2013	March 2014	
Batman Black and White (vol. 2)	#1 – 6	November 2013	April 2014	
Batman: Arkham Knight	#1 – 12	March 2015	December 2015	
Bat-Mite	#1 – 6	June 2015	November 2015	
Harley Quinn and Power Girl	#1 – 6	June 2015	November 2015	
Batman Arkham Knight - Genesis	#1 – 6	August 2015	January 2016	
Batman: Dark Knight III - The Master Race	#1 – 9	November 2015	June 2017	In addition to the main story, there were nine tie-in issues connected to this miniseries. They are, in chronological order: Dark Knight Presents: The Atom #1 (which takes place between issues #1 and 2); Dark Knight Presents: Wonder Woman #1 (which takes place between issues #2 and 3); Dark Knight Presents: Green Lantern #1 - Hal Jordan (which takes place between issues #3 and 4); Dark Knight Presents: Batgirl #1 (which takes place between issues #4 and 5); Dark Knight Presents: Lara #1 (which takes place between issues #5 and 6); Dark Knight Presents: World's Finest #1 (which takes place between issues #6 and 7); Dark Knight Presents: Strange Adventures #1 (which takes place between issues #7 and 8); Dark Knight Presents: Detective Comics #1 (which takes place between issues #8 and 9); Dark Knight Presents: Action Comics #1 (which takes place after issue #9)
Batman: Europa	#1 – 4	November 2015	February 2016	
Poison Ivy: Cycle of Life and Death	#1 – 6	January 2016	June 2016	
Harley Quinn and Her Gang of Harleys	#1 – 6	June 2016	November 2016	
Harley's Little Black Book	#1 – 6	February 2016	May 2017	
Bane: Conquest	#1 – 12	May 2017	June 2018	
Batman: White Knight	#1 – 8	December 2017	July 2018	Preceded by Batman: White Knight Presents Von Freeze #1 (January 2020) (see One-shots and graphic novels below) and continued in Batman: Curse of the White Knight #1 – 8 (September 2019 – May 2020), Batman: White Knight Presents Harley Quinn #1 – 6 (December 2020 – May 2021), Batman: Beyond the White Knight #1 – 8 (March 2022 – October 2022), Batman: White Knight Presents: Red Hood #1 – 2 (October 2022 – October 2022) and Batman: White Knight Presents: Generation Joker #1 – 6 (July 2023-) (see below).
Batman: Creature of the Night	#1 – 4	January 2018	January 2020	
Batman: Sins of the Father	#1 – 6	February 2018	July 2018	
Batman: Damned	#1 – 3	November 2018	August 2019	Published under the DC Black Label logo. A loose sequel to the graphic novel Joker (December 2008) (see One-shots and graphic novels below).
Batman Secret Files	#1 – 3	December 2018	August 2020	There is an eight-month gap between the first and second issue and a 12-month gap between the second and third issue. Issue #2 was a tie-in issue to the DC Comics story line "City of Bane". Issue #3 was the last issue of the miniseries.
Old Lady Harley	#1 – 5	December 2018	April 2019	This miniseries was a parody of Marvel Comics' character and story line of Old Man Logan.
The Batman Who Laughs (vol. 2)	#1 – 7	February 2019	September 2019	A one-shot titled The Batman Who Laughs: The Grim Knight #1 (May 2019) takes place between issues #3 and 4 of this miniseries (see One-shots and graphic novels below).
Batman: Last Knight on Earth	#1 – 3	July 2019	February 2020	Published under the DC Black Label logo.
Batman: Universe	#1 – 6	July 2019	December 2019	
Batman: Curse of the White Knight	#1 – 8	September 2019	May 2020	Published under the DC Black Label logo. The first sequel to Batman: White Knight #1 – 8 (December 2017 – July 2018) (see above).
Harleen	#1 – 3	November 2019	February 2020	Published under the DC Black Label logo.
Joker: Killer Smile	#1 – 3	December 2019	April 2020	Published under the DC Black Label logo. Continued - and concluded - in Batman: The Smile Killer #1 (August 2020) (see One-shots and graphic novels below)
Joker/Harley: Criminal Sanity	#1 – 8	December 2019	June 2021	Published under the DC Black Label logo.
Harley Quinn and the Birds of Prey	#1 – 4	April 2020	March 2021	Published under the DC Black Label logo.
Harley Quinn Black + White + Red	#1 – 17	June 2020	December 2020	A digital-first miniseries and a parody of Batman Black and White (see above and below). The only physical publication of this miniseries to date is the trade paperback Harley Quinn Black + White + Red (see Miscellaneous collections below).
Harley Quinn: Make 'Em Laugh	#1 – 3	June 2020	July 2020	A digital-first miniseries.
Batman: The Adventures Continue	#1 – 8	June 2020	January 2021	
Batman: Three Jokers	#1 – 3	October 2020	December 2020	Published under the DC Black Label logo. The sequel to Batman: The Killing Joke (1988) (see One-shots and graphic novels below).
Batman Black and White (vol. 3)	#1 – 6	December 2020	May 2021	
Batman: White Knight Presents Harley Quinn	#1 – 6	December 2020	May 2021	Published under the DC Black Label logo. The second sequel to Batman: White Knight #1 – 8 (December 2017 – July 2018) (see above).
Batman/Catwoman	#1 – 12	February 2021	August 2022	Published under the DC Black Label logo.
Man-Bat (vol. 4)	#1 – 5	April 2021	August 2021	
Batman: The Detective	#1 – 6	April 2021	November 2021	
Batman: The Adventures Continue Season Two	#1 – 7	June 2021	December 2021	
Batman: Reptilian	#1 – 6	June 2021	November 2021	
Batman '89	#1 – 6	August 2021	June 2022	
Batman vs. Bigby! A Wolf in Gotham	#1 – 6	September 2021	February 2022	Published under the DC Black Label logo.
Batman: The Imposter	#1 – 3	October 2021	December 2021	Published under the DC Black Label logo.
Arkham City: The Order of the World	#1 – 6	October 2021	March 2022	
Catwoman: Lonely City	#1 – 4	October 2021	October 2022	
Batman: The Knight	#1 – 10	January 2022	October 2022	
Batman: One Dark Knight	#1 – 3	February 2022	September 2022	Published under the DC Black Label logo. Issue #1 was cover dated February 2022, issue #2 was cover dated May 2022 and issue #3 was cover dated September 2022.
Batman: Killing Time	#1 – 6	March 2022	August 2022	
Batman: Beyond the White Knight	#1 – 8	March 2022	October 2022	Published under the DC Black Label logo. The third sequel to Batman: White Knight #1 – 8 (December 2017 – July 2018) (see above).
Batman Beyond: Neo-Year	#1 – 6	June 2022	November 2022	Based on the animated television series Batman Beyond.
Batman: Fortress	#1 – 8	July 2022	March 2023	
Batman: The Audio Adventures	#1 – 7	September 2022	July 2023	
Batman: White Knight Presents: Red Hood	#1 – 2	October 2022	October 2022	Published under the DC Black Label logo. The fourth sequel to Batman: White Knight #1 – 8 (December 2017 – July 2018) and the prequel to Batman: Beyond the White Knight #1 – 8 (March 2022 – October 2022) (see above).
Batman: Gotham Knights - Gilded City	#1 – 6	October 2022	March 2023	
Gotham City: Year One	#1 – 6	October 2022	March 2023	
Batman vs. Robin	#1 – 5	November 2022	April 2023	
The Riddler: Year One	#1 – 6	December 2022	October 2023	Published under the DC Black Label logo.
Batman & the Joker: The Deadly Duo	#1 – 7	January 2023	August 2023	Published under the DC Black Label logo.
Batman: The Adventures Continue Season Three	#1 – 8	January 2023	October 2023	
Batman: White Knight Presents: Generation Joker	#1 – 6	July 2023	December 2023	Published under the DC Black Label logo. The fifth sequel to Batman: White Knight #1 – 8 (December 2017 – July 2018) and the sequel to Batman: Beyond the White Knight #1 – 8 (March 2022 – October 2022) (see above).
Knight Terrors	#1 – 4	September 2023	October 2023	
Knight Terrors: Batman	#1 – 2	September 2023	October 2023	
Knight Terrors: Poison Ivy	#1 – 2	September 2023	October 2023	
Knight Terrors: The Joker	#1 – 2	September 2023	October 2023	
Knight Terrors: Robin	#1 – 2	September 2023	October 2023	
Knight Terrors: Catwoman	#1 – 2	September 2023	October 2023	
Knight Terrors: Detective Comics	#1 – 2	September 2023	October 2023	
Knight Terrors: Harley Quinn	#1 – 2	September 2023	October 2023	
Knight Terrors: Nightwing	#1 – 2	September 2023	October 2023	
Knight Terrors: Punchline	#1 – 2	September 2023	October 2023	
Batman Beyond: Neo-Gothic	#1 – 6	September 2023	February 2024	
Batman: Gargoyle of Gotham	#1 – 4	September 2023	August 2026	Published under the DC Black Label logo
Batman/Catwoman: The Gotham War: Red Hood	#1 – 2	November 2023	December 2023	
Batman: City of Madness	#1 – 3	December 2023	April 2024	Published under the DC Black Label logo.
Batman: Off-World	#1 – 6	January 2024	April 2025	
Batman '89: Echoes	#1 – 6	January 2024	September 2025	
Red Hood: The Hill	#0 – 6	April 2024	September 2024	
The Bat-Man: First Knight	#1 – 3	May 2024	July 2024	Published under the DC Black Label logo.
Batman and Robin and Howard	#1 – 4	May 2024	August 2024	New edition of the 2021's Batman and Robin and Howard GN
Batman: Dark Age	#1 – 6	May 2024	January 2025	Published under the DC Black Label logo.
The Boy Wonder	#1 – 5	July 2024	November 2024	Published under the DC Black Label logo.
Batman: Gotham by Gaslight - The Kryptonian Age	#1 – 12	August 2024	January 2025	
From the DC Vault: Death in the Family - Robin Lives!	#1 – 4	September 2024	December 2025	
Batman & Robin: Year One	#1 – 12	October 2024	October 2025	
Batman: The Long Halloween - The Last Halloween	#0 – 10	November 2024	December 2025	
Two-Face	#1 – 6	February 2025	July 2025	
Batman & Robin: Year One – Dynamic Duos	#1 – present	August 2026		Sequel to Batman & Robin: Year One.
Absolute Catwoman	#1 – present	August 2026		Published under the Absolute Universe imprint.
Batman: Bad Seeds – Gotham General	#1 – present	October 2026		

== One-shots and graphic novels ==
Title	Cover date	Notes
3-D Batman	1953	
3-D Batman	1966	
Batman Special #1	1984	
Batman: Son of the Demon	1987	The unofficial beginning of a DC Comics story line that was continued in a series of three Elseworlds stories, which are Batman: KnightGallery (October 1995), Batman: Brotherhood of the Bat (November 1995) and Batman: League of Batmen #1 – 2 (April – May 2001) (for the first two stories, see below; for the third story, see Miniseries above).: Hardcover: ISBN 0-930289-24-2; Softcover: ISBN 978-0-930289-25-6
The Outsiders Special #1	1987	
Batgirl Special #1	1988	The sequel - and conclusion - to a Batgirl story from Secret Origins (vol. 2) #20 (November 1987).
Batman: The Killing Joke	1988; 2008	Continued years later in Batman: Three Jokers #1 – 3 (October 2020 – December 2020) (see Miniseries above).: Softcover: ISBN 978-0-930289-45-4; Hardcover: ISBN 978-1-4012-1667-2
Gotham by Gaslight: An Alternative History of the Batman	February 1989	The first Elseworlds story of them all, even though it was not originally published as such.
Batman: Arkham Asylum - A Serious House on Serious Earth	1989; 1990	Hardcover: ISBN 978-0-930289-48-5; Softcover: ISBN 978-0-930289-56-0
Batman: The Official Comic Adaptation of the Warner Bros. Motion Picture	1989	Published in conjunction with the film Batman.
Batman: Bride of the Demon	1990; 1992	Hardcover: ISBN 978-0-930289-79-9; Softcover: ISBN 978-1-56389-060-4
Batman: Digital Justice	1990	The first Batman story - and the first comic book story - ever to be created digitally. ISBN 978-0-930289-87-4
Batman: Full Circle	1991	The sequel to Batman: Year Two (see Modern Batman below).
Batman: Holy Terror	1991	Published under the Elseworlds logo. The first Elseworlds story ever to have the imprint's logo on the cover.
Batman: Master of the Future	1991	Published under the Elseworlds logo. The sequel to Gotham by Gaslight: An Alternative History of the Batman.
Batman & Dracula: Red Rain	1991	Published under the Elseworlds logo. The first novel in the Batman & Dracula trilogy. ISBN 978-1-56389-036-9
Batman: Seduction of the Gun #1	February 1992	
Batman: Penguin Triumphant	March 1992	
Batman: Catwoman Defiant	March 1992	
Batman: Night Cries	1992; 1993	Hardcover: ISBN 978-1-56389-059-8; Softcover: ISBN 978-1-56389-066-6
Batman: Birth of the Demon	1992; 1993	Hardcover: ISBN 978-1-56389-080-2; Softcover: ISBN 978-1-56389-081-9
Batman: Word to the Wise	1992	
Batman: The Blue, the Grey, and the Bat	1992	Published under the Elseworlds logo.
Batman/Green Arrow: The Poison Tomorrow	1992	
The Batman Gallery #1	1992	
Batman Returns: The Official Comic Adaptation of the Warner Bros. Motion Picture	1992	Published in conjunction with the film Batman Returns.
Batman: Vengeance of Bane #1	January 1993	
Batman/Dark Joker: The Wild	1993	Published under the Elseworlds logo. ISBN 978-1-56389-111-3
Batman: Legends of the Dark Knight Halloween Special	December 1993	
Batman: Mask of the Phantasm – The Official Comics Adaptation of the Warner Bros. Motion Picture	1993	Published in conjunction with the animated film Batman: Mask of the Phantasm.
Batman/Houdini: The Devil's Workshop	1993	Published under the Elseworlds logo.
The Batman Adventures: Mad Love	February 1994	Based on the animated television series Batman: The Animated Series.
Batman: Bloodstorm	1994	Published under the Elseworlds logo. The second novel in the Batman & Dracula trilogy.
Batman: Castle of the Bat	1994	Published under the Elseworlds logo.
Batman: In Darkest Knight	1994	Published under the Elseworlds logo.
Batman: The Last Angel	1994	
Batman: Madness – A Legends of the Dark Knight Halloween Special	1994	
The Batman Adventures Holiday Special #1	January 1995	Based on the animated television series Batman: The Animated Series.
Batman Forever: The Official Comic Adaptation of the Warner Bros. Motion Picture	July 1995	Published in conjunction with the film Batman Forever.
Nightwing: Alfred's Return #1	July 1995	Published as part of the DC Comics crossover story line "KnightsEnd", which is the third and last part of the DC Comics crossover story arc Batman: Knightfall.
Batman: KnightGallery	October 1995	Published under the Elseworlds logo. The first part of a three-part DC Comics story line unofficially connected to Batman: Son of the Demon (1987), a non-Elseworlds story (see above). Continued in Batman: Brotherhood of the Bat (November 1995) (see below) and Batman: League of Batmen 1 – 2 (April – May 2001), two more Elseworlds stories (for the latter story, see Miniseries above).
Batman: Brotherhood of the Bat	November 1995	Published under the Elseworlds logo. The second part of a three-part DC Comics story line unofficially connected to Batman: Son of the Demon (1987), a non-Elseworlds story (see above). Preceded by Batman: KnightGallery (October 1995) (see above) and continued in Batman: League of Batmen #1 – 2 (April – May 2001), two more Elseworlds stories (for the latter story, see Miniseries above).
Underworld Unleashed: Batman – Devil's Asylum #1	December 1995	Published as part of the DC Comics crossover event Underworld Unleashed.
Batman: Faces	1995	Not an original story, Collects Batman: Legends of the Dark Knight (1989-2007) #28-30
Batman: Ghosts – A Legends of the Dark Knight Halloween Special	1995	
Batman: Mitefall – A Legends of the Dark Mite Special	1995	Published as the sequel - and conclusion - to Batman: Legends of the Dark Knight #38 (October 1992) and as part of the DC Comics crossover story arc Batman: Knightfall.
Batman: Vengeance of Bane II – The Redemption	1995	
Batman: Riddler – The Riddle Factory	1995	
Batman: Two-Face – Crime and Punishment	1996	
Batman: Dark Knight Gallery #1	January 1996	
Azrael Plus/The Question #1	December 1996	
Batman: Dark Allegiances	1996	Published under the Elseworlds logo.
Batman: Death of Innocents	December 1996	
Batman: Scar of the Bat	1996	Published under the Elseworlds logo.
Batman/Deadman: Death and Glory	1996	ISBN 978-1-56389-228-8
Batman/Demon	1996	
Black Canary/Oracle: Birds of Prey #1	1996	
The Joker: Devil's Advocate	1995; 1996	Hardcover: ISBN 978-1-56389-240-0; Softcover: ISBN 978-1-56389-280-6
Batman: Blackgate #1	January 1997	
Batman & Superman Adventures: World's Finest – The Official Comics Adaptation	February 1997	Published in conjunction with the three-part episode "World's Finest" from Superman: The Animated Series.
Batman Plus/Arsenal #1	February 1997	
Batman: Bane	May 1997	
Batman: Batgirl	May 1997	
Batman: Mr. Freeze	May 1997	
Batman: Poison Ivy	May 1997	
The Batman Chronicles Gallery #1	May 1997	
Batman & Robin: The Official Comic Adaptation of the Warner Bros. Motion Picture	June 1997	Published in conjunction with the film Batman & Robin.
The Batman Chronicles: The Gauntlet	September 1997	
Batman Secret Files and Origins #1	October 1997	
Batman: Dark Knight Dynasty	1997; 2000	Published under the Elseworlds logo.: Hardcover: ISBN 1-56389-384-3; Softcover: ISBN 1-56389-390-8
Catwoman Plus/Scream Queen #1	November 1997	
Batman: Masque	1997	Published under the Elseworlds logo.
Batman/Phantom Stranger	1997	
Batman & Robin Adventures: SubZero – The Official Comics Adaption of the Warner Home Video Animated Film	1997	Published in conjunction with the animated film Batman & Mr. Freeze: SubZero.
Black Canary/Oracle: Birds of Prey – Revolution #1	1997	
Black Canary/Oracle: Birds of Prey – Wolves #1	1997	
The Batgirl Adventures #1	February 1998	
Batgirl and Batman: Thrillkiller '62	February 1998	Published under the Elseworlds logo. The sequel - and conclusion - to Batgirl and Robin: Thrillkiller #1 – 3 (January – March 1997), another Elseworlds story (see Miniseries above).
Batman: The Abduction	April 1998	Continued - and concluded - in Batman: Dreamland (July 2000) (see below).
Batman: Blackgate – Isle of Men #1	April 1998	Published as part of the DC Comics crossover story arc Batman: Cataclysm.
Batman: Arkham Asylum – Tales of Madness #1	May 1998	Published as part of the DC Comics crossover story arc Batman: Cataclysm.
Batman/Huntress/Spoiler: Blunt Trauma #1	May 1998	Published as part of the DC Comics crossover story arc Batman: Cataclysm.
Batman: Batgirl (vol. 2) #1	1998	Published under the Girlfrenzy! trade dress.
Elseworld's Finest: Supergirl & Batgirl	September 1998	Published under the Elseworlds logo.
Batman Villains Secret Files and Origins #1	October 1998	
Batman: Two Faces #1	November 1998	Published under the Elseworlds logo. The prequel to The Superman Monster (October 1999), another Elseworlds story.
The All-New Birds of Prey: Black Canary/Batgirl #1	1998	
Birds of Prey: The Ravens #1	1998	Published under the Girlfrenzy! trade dress.
Batman: Crimson Mist	1998; 2001	Published under the Elseworlds logo. The third (and final) novel in the Batman & Dracula trilogy.: Hardcover: ISBN 1-56389-477-7; Softcover
Batman: I, Joker	1998	Published under the Elseworlds logo.
Batman: Reign of Terror	December 1998	Published under the Elseworlds logo.
Batman: Scottish Connection	1998	
Batman/Scarecrow 3-D	December 1998	
Robin/Argent: Double-Shot #1	1998	
Batman: Nosferatu	1999	Published under the Elseworlds logo. The second part of a trilogy, preceded by Superman's Metropolis (1996) and continued in Wonder Woman: The Blue Amazon (2003), two more Elseworlds stories.
Batman: Joker's Apprentice #1	May 1999	
Batman: The Book of Shadows	July 1999	
Batman: No Man's Land Gallery #1	July 1999	
Batman: Bullock's Law #1	August 1999	
Batman: Fortunate Son	1999	Hardcover: ISBN 978-1-56389-578-4; Softcover: ISBN 978-1-56389-590-6
Batman: Harley Quinn	October 1999	The official first appearance of Harley Quinn in the mainstream DC Universe.
Nightwing Secret Files and Origins #1	October 1999	
Batman: Day of Judgment #1	November 1999	
Batman: War on Crime	November 1999	ISBN 978-1-56389-576-0
Batman: The Chalice	1999; 2000	Hardcover: ISBN 978-1-56389-592-0; Softcover: ISBN 978-1-56389-632-3
Batman: D.O.A.	December 1999	
Batman: No Man's Land – No Law and a New Order	1999	Not an original story, reprints the first "No Law and a New Order" 4-part story arc
Batman: No Man's Land Secret Files and Origins #1	December 1999	
Batman: Gotham City Secret Files and Origins #1	April 2000	
Batman/Lobo	April 2000	Published under the Elseworlds logo.
Batman: The Hill #1	May 2000	
Sins of Youth: Batboy and Robin	May 2000	
The Batman of Arkham	June 2000	Published under the Elseworlds logo.
Batman: Dreamland	July 2000	The sequel - and conclusion - to Batman: The Abduction (April 1998) (see above).
Batman: Ego	August 2000	
Robin 80-Page Giant #1	September 2000	
Batman: Harvest Breed	2000–2003	Hardcover: ISBN 978-1-56389-692-7; Softcover: ISBN 978-1-56389-775-7
Superman and Batman: World's Funnest	November 2000	
Batman/Demon: A Tragedy	2000	Published under the Elseworlds logo.
Nightwing 80-Page Giant #1	December 2000	
Realworlds: Batman	2000	Published under the Realworlds logo.
Batman Beyond: Return of the Joker – The Official Comics Adaptation	February 2001	Published in conjunction with the animated film Batman Beyond: Return of the Joker.
Nightwing: The Target	July 2001	
Batman: Our Worlds at War #1	August 2001	Published as part of the DC Comics crossover event Our Worlds at War.
Nightwing: Our Worlds at War #1	September 2001	Published as part of the DC Comics crossover event Our Worlds at War.
Harley Quinn: Our Worlds at War #1	October 2001	Published as part of the DC Comics crossover event Our Worlds at War.
Batman: Gotham Noir	2001	Published under the Elseworlds logo.
Batman/Scarface: A Psychodrama	2001	
Joker: Last Laugh Secret Files and Origins #1	December 2001	Published as the beginning of the DC Comics crossover event Joker: Last Laugh (see Miniseries above).
Batman: The 10-Cent Adventure	March 2002	
Batman: Nine Lives	2002; 2003	Hardcover: ISBN 1-56389-853-5; Softcover: ISBN 1-56389-979-5
Batgirl Secret Files and Origins #1	August 2002	
Catwoman: Selina's Big Score	July 2002; 2003	Hardcover: ISBN 1-56389-897-7; Softcover
DC 1st: Batgirl/The Joker #1	July 2002	
Batman: Absolution	2002; 2003	Hardcover: ISBN 978-1-56389-934-8; Softcover: ISBN 978-1-4012-0037-4
Catwoman Secret Files and Origins #1	November 2002	
Batman/Nightwing: Bloodborne	2002	
Batman: Child of Dreams	February 2003; 2003	Hardcover: ISBN 978-1-56389-906-5; Softcover: ISBN 978-1-56389-907-2
Batman: Hong Kong	2003; 2004	Hardcover: ISBN 978-1-4012-0057-2; Softcover: ISBN 978-1-4012-0101-2
Birds of Prey Secret Files and Origins 2003	August 2003	
Planetary/Batman: Night on Earth	August 2003	
Superman/Batman Secret Files and Origins 2003	November 2003	
Batman: The Golden Streets of Gotham	2003	Published under the Elseworlds logo.
Batman/Joker: Switch	2003	
Birds of Prey: Batgirl/Catwoman	2003	
Birds of Prey: Catwoman/Oracle	2003	
Teen Titans/Outsiders Secret Files and Origins 2003	December 2003	
Batman: Room Full of Strangers	April 2004	
Batman & Poison Ivy: Cast Shadows	April 2004	
Batman: The Order of Beasts	September 2004	Published under the Elseworlds logo.
DC Comics Presents: Batman #1	September 2004	This issue's cover art is an homage to the cover of Batman #183 (August 1966) and the issue itself - the first issue of an eight-issue miniseries - was made as a tribute to DC editor Julius "Julie" Schwartz, who died on February 8, 2004.
Batman: The 12-Cent Adventure #1	October 2004	
Catwoman: The Movie #1	2004	Published in conjunction with the film Catwoman.
Batman: The Man Who Laughs	2005; 2009	Softcover: ISBN 978-1-4012-1626-9; Hardcover: ISBN 978-1-4012-1622-1
Batman Begins: The Official Movie Adaptation	June 2005	Published in conjunction with the film Batman Begins.
Batman Villains Secret Files and Origins 2005	July 2005	
Batman Allies Secret Files and Origins 2005	August 2005	
Teen Titans/Outsiders Secret Files and Origins 2005	October 2005	
Outsiders: Five of a Kind – Katana and Shazam! #1	October 2007	
Outsiders: Five of a Kind – Thunder and Martian Manhunter #1	October 2007	
Outsiders: Five of a Kind – Metamorpho and Aquaman #1	October 2007	
Outsiders: Five of a Kind – Nightwing and Captain Boomerang #1	October 2007	
Outsiders: Five of a Kind – Wonder Woman and Grace #1	October 2007	
Robin/Spoiler Special #1	August 2008	
Joker's Asylum: The Joker #1	September 2008	Published under the Joker's Asylum trade dress.
Joker's Asylum: Penguin #1	September 2008	Published under the Joker's Asylum trade dress.
Joker's Asylum: Poison Ivy #1	September 2008	Published under the Joker's Asylum trade dress.
Joker's Asylum: Scarecrow #1	September 2008	Published under the Joker's Asylum trade dress.
Joker's Asylum: Two-Face #1	September 2008	Published under the Joker's Asylum trade dress.
Joker	December 2008	Loosely continued in Batman: Damned #1 – 3 (November 2018 – August 2019) (see Miniseries above).
Batman and the Outsiders Special #1	March 2009	
Batman: Battle for the Cowl – Gotham Gazette: Batman Dead? #1	May 2009	Published under the Battle for the Cowl trade dress.
Batman: Battle for the Cowl – Commissioner Gordon #1	May 2009	Published under the Battle for the Cowl trade dress.
Batman: Battle for the Cowl – Arkham Asylum #1	June 2009	Published under the Battle for the Cowl trade dress.
Batman: Battle for the Cowl – Man-Bat #1	June 2009	Published under the Battle for the Cowl trade dress.
Batman: Battle for the Cowl – The Underground #1	June 2009	Published under the Battle for the Cowl trade dress.
Batman: Battle for the Cowl – The Network #1	July 2009	Published under the Battle for the Cowl trade dress.
Batman: Battle for the Cowl – Gotham Gazette: Batman Alive? #1	July 2009	Published under the Battle for the Cowl trade dress.
Batman in Barcelona: Dragon's Knight	July 2009	
Batman: Arkham Asylum - The Road to Arkham	August 2009	
Batman/Doc Savage Special #1	January 2010	Published under the First Wave trade dress.
Batman 80-Page Giant (vol. 2) #1	February 2010	
Joker's Asylum II: Mad Hatter #1	August 2010	Published under the Joker's Asylum II trade dress.
Joker's Asylum II: Harley Quinn #1	August 2010	Published under the Joker's Asylum II trade dress.
Joker's Asylum II: The Riddler #1	August 2010	Published under the Joker's Asylum II trade dress.
Joker's Asylum II: Killer Croc #1	August 2010	Published under the Joker's Asylum II trade dress.
Joker's Asylum II: Clayface #1	August 2010	Published under the Joker's Asylum II trade dress.
Arkham Asylum: Madness	2010	ISBN 978-1-4012-2337-3
Batman: Hidden Treasures #1	December 2010	
Bruce Wayne: The Road Home – Batgirl #1	December 2010	
Bruce Wayne: The Road Home – Batman and Robin #1	December 2010	
Bruce Wayne: The Road Home – Catwoman #1	December 2010	
Bruce Wayne: The Road Home – Commissioner Gordon #1	December 2010	
Bruce Wayne: The Road Home – Oracle #1	December 2010	
Bruce Wayne: The Road Home – Outsiders #1	December 2010	
Bruce Wayne: The Road Home – Ra's al Ghul #1	December 2010	
Bruce Wayne: The Road Home – Red Robin #1	December 2010	
Batman: The Return #1	January 2011	
Batman/Catwoman: Follow the Money #1	January 2011	
Batwoman #0	January 2011	Not to be confused with Batwoman (vol. 2) #0 (September 2012) which was published as part of the DC Comics crossover event Zero Month (see Ongoing series above).
Batman 80-Page Giant 2010	February 2011	
Batman 80-Page Giant 2011	October 2011	
Batman: Noël	2011	
DC Retroactive: Batman – The '70s #1	September 2011	
DC Retroactive: Batman – The '80s #1	October 2011	
DC Retroactive: Batman – The '90s #1	October 2011	
Batman: Through the Looking Glass	December 2011	
Batman Incorporated: Leviathan Strikes! #1	February 2012	Originally intended to be Batman Incorporated #9 – 10, the last two issues of that series (see Ongoing series above).
Batman: Death by Design	May 2012	ISBN 978-1-4012-3453-9
Batman: Earth One	July 2012	
Batman, Incorporated Special #1	August 2013	
Batman: Joker's Daughter #1	April 2014	
Forever Evil Aftermath: Batman vs. Bane #1	April 2014	
Harley Quinn: Director's Cut #0	June 2014	
Harley Quinn Invades Comic-Con International: San Diego #1	July 2014	
Robin Rises: Omega #1	July 2014	
Robin Rises: Alpha #1	December 2014	
Harley Quinn Holiday Special #1	December 2014	
Harley Quinn Valentine's Day Special #1	February 2015	
Batman: Earth One Vol. 2	May 2015	
Gotham Academy: Endgame #1	May 2015	Published as part of the Batman: Endgame storyline.
Detective Comics: Endgame #1	May 2015	Published as part of the Batman: Endgame storyline.
Batgirl: Endgame #1	May 2015	Published as part of the Batman: Endgame storyline.
Arkham Manor: Endgame #1	June 2015	Published as part of the Batman: Endgame storyline.
Batman Arkham Origins	July 2015	
Harley Quinn: Be Careful What You Wish For #1	March 2016	A Loot Crate exclusive one-shot issue. Re-published in March 2018 as a special edition with a different cover (see below).
Batman: Rebirth #1	June 2016	
Dark Knight Returns: The Last Crusade	June 2016	
Batgirl/Birds of Prey: Rebirth #1	July 2016	
Nightwing: Rebirth #1	September 2016	
Red Hood and the Outlaws: Rebirth #1	September 2016	
Batwowan: Rebirth #1	April 2017	
Batman Beyond: Rebirth #1	September 2017	
Harley Quinn 25th Anniversary Special #1	November 2017	
Batman: The Dark Prince Charming	November 2017	
Batman: The Red Death #1	November 2017	Published as part of the DC Comics crossover story line Dark Knights: Metal (see DC Rebirth Batman below)
Batman: The Murder Machine #1	November 2017	Published as part of the DC Comics crossover story line Dark Nights: Metal (see DC Rebirth Batman below)
Batman: The Dawnbreaker #1	December 2017	Published as part of the DC Comics crossover story line Dark Nights: Metal (see DC Rebirth Batman below)
Batman: The Drowned #1	December 2017	Published as part of the DC Comics crossover story line Dark Nights: Metal (see DC Rebirth Batman below)
Batman in Noir Alley	2017	
Batman: The Merciless #1	January 2018	Published as part of the DC Comics crossover story line Dark Nights: Metal (see DC Rebirth Batman below)
Batman: The Devastator #1	January 2018	Published as part of the DC Comics crossover story line Dark Nights: Metal (see DC Rebirth Batman below)
The Batman Who Laughs #1	January 2018	Published as part of the DC Comics crossover story line Dark Nights: Metal (see DC Rebirth Batman below)
Batman: Lost #1	January 2018	Published as part of the DC Comics crossover story line Dark Nights: Metal (see DC Rebirth Batman below)
Harley Quinn: Be Careful What You Wish For #1	March 2018	A special edition of the preceding Loot Crate exclusive one-shot issue (see above) with a different cover.
Batman: Prelude to the Wedding: Robin vs. Ra's al Ghul #1	July 2018	Published as part of the Prelude to the Wedding storyline.
Batman: Prelude to the Wedding: Nightwing vs. Hush #1	August 2018	Published as part of the Prelude to the Wedding storyline.
Batman: Prelude to the Wedding: Batgirl vs. The Riddler #1	August 2018	Published as part of the Prelude to the Wedding storyline.
Batman: Prelude to the Wedding: Red Hood vs. Anarky #1	August 2018	Published as part of the Prelude to the Wedding storyline.
Batman: Prelude to the Wedding: Harley Quinn vs. The Joker #1	August 2018	Published as part of the Prelude to the Wedding storyline.
The Batman Who Laughs: The Grim Knight #1	May 2019	This issue takes place between issues #3 and 4 of the miniseries The Batman Who Laughs (vol. 2) #1 – 7 (February 2019 – September 2019 (see Miniseries above)
Detective Comics: Batman 80th Anniversary Giant #1	May 2019	A Walmart exclusive one-shot published in honor of the 80th anniversary of the Batman's first appearance in Detective Comics #27 (May 1939).
Robin 80th Anniversary 100-Page Super Spectacular #1	January 2020	In addition to this issue's main cover, it also had nine variant covers that each portray Robin the Boy Wonder as he appeared from the 1930s to the 2010s. Published in honor of the 80th anniversary of Robin the Boy Wonder I's first appearance in Detective Comics #38 (April 1940).
Batman: White Knight Presents Von Freeze #1	January 2020	Published under the DC Black Label logo. The prequel to Batman: White Knight #1 – 8 (December 2017 – July 2018), Batman: Curse of the White Knight #1 – 8 (September 2019 – May 2020), Batman: White Knight Presents Harley Quinn #1 – 6 (December 2020 – March 2021), Batman: Beyond the White Knight #1 – 8 (March 2022 – October 2022) and Batman: White Knight Presents: Red Hood #1 – 2 (October 2022 – October 2022) (see Miniseries above)
Harley Quinn's Villain of the Year #1	February 2020	Published as a tie-in issue to the DC Comics crossover event Year of the Villain.
Dark Knight Returns: The Golden Child	February 2020	Published under the DC Black Label logo.
The Infected: The Commissioner #1	February 2020	Published as a tie-in issue to the DC Comics crossover event Year of the Villain.
Batman: Pennyworth R.I.P. #1	April 2020	Published as a tie-in issue to the DC Comics story line "City of Bane".
Catwoman 80th Anniversary 100-Page Super Spectacular #1	June 2020	In addition to this issue's main cover, it also had eight variant covers that each portray the Catwoman as she appeared from the 1940s to the 2010s. Published in honor of the 80th anniversary of the Catwoman's first appearance in Batman #1 (spring 1940; see cover above).
The Joker 80th Anniversary 100-Page Super Spectacular #1	June 2020	In addition to this issue's main cover, it also had eight variant covers that each portray the Joker as he appeared from the 1940s to the 2010s. Published in honor of the 80th anniversary of the Joker's first two appearances in Batman #1 (spring 1940; see cover above).
Birds of Prey (vol. 4) #1	August 2020	Published under the DC Black Label logo.
Batman: The Smile Killer #1	August 2020	Published under the DC Black Label logo. The sequel - and conclusion - to Joker: Killer Smile #1 – 3 (December 2019 – April 2020) (see Miniseries above).
Joker/Harley: Criminal Sanity Secret Files	September 2020	Published under the DC Black Label logo. This issue takes place between Joker/Harley: Criminal Sanity #4 and 5 (see Miniseries above).
Batman: The Joker War Zone #1	November 2020	Published as a tie-in issue to the DC Comics crossover story line "The Joker War".
Punchline #1	November 2020	Published as a one-shot that takes place after the events of the DC Comics crossover story line "The Joker War" and reveals the origin of Punchline.
Batman: The World	September 2021	
Batman Secret Files: The Signal #1	September 2021	Issued with three different covers.
Batman Secret Files: Huntress #1	September 2021	Issued with three different covers.
Batman Secret Files: Clownhunter #1	October 2021	Issued with three different covers.
Batman Secret Files: Miracle Molly #1	November 2021	Issued with three different covers. Published as a tie-in issue to the DC Comics crossover story line "Fear State".
Batman Secret Files: Peacekeeper-01 #1	December 2021	Issued with three different covers. Published as a tie-in issue to the DC Comics crossover story line "Fear State".
Batman Secret Files: The Gardener #1	January 2022	Issued with three different covers. Published as a tie-in issue to the DC Comics crossover story line "Fear State".
Batman/Catwoman Special #1	March 2022	Published under the DC Black Label logo. This issue takes between Batman/Catwoman #9 and 10 (see Miniseries above).
Shadow War: Alpha #1	March 2022	Published as the beginning of the DC Comics crossover event Shadow War.
Shadow War: Omega #1	May 2022	Published as the ending of the DC Comics crossover event Shadow War.
Batman: Dear Detective	September 2022	
Harley Quinn 30th Anniversary Special #1	November 2022	
Harley Quinn Uncovered #1	December 2022	
Batman: One Bad Day – The Riddler #1	October 2022	
Batman: One Bad Day – Two-Face #1	November 2022	
Batman: One Bad Day – Penguin #1	December 2022	
Batman: One Bad Day – Mr. Freeze #1	January 2023	
Batman: One Bad Day – Bane #1	March 2023	
Batman: One Bad Day – Catwoman #1	March 2023	
Batman: Legends of Gotham #1	March 2023	
Lazarus Planet: Alpha #1	March 2023	Published as the beginning of the DC Comics crossover event Lazarus Planet.
Lazarus Planet: Omega #1	April 2023	Published as the ending of the DC Comics crossover event Lazarus Planet.
Batman: One Bad Day – Clayface #1	April 2023	
Batman: One Bad Day – Ra's al Ghul #1	May 2023	
Knight Terrors: Night's End #1	October 2023	Published as the ending of the DC Comics crossover event Knight Terrors.
Batman/Catwoman: The Gotham War: Battle Lines #1	October 2023	Published as the beginning of the DC Comics crossover event Gotham War.
Batman/Catwoman: The Gotham War: Scorched Earth #1	December 2023	Published as the ending of the DC Comics crossover event Gotham War.
Batman: Bad Seeds – Sunset #1	August 2026	Opening special of the Batman: Bad Seeds crossover event.
Batman: Bad Seeds – Streets of Gotham #1	October 2026	Special featuring stories about ordinary Gotham City residents during the Batman: Bad Seeds event.
Batman: Bad Seeds – Sunrise #1	October 2026	Oversized concluding special of Batman: Bad Seeds.
Absolute Cassandra Cain: The Shadow's Hand #1	November 2026	Published as part of the Absolute Universe.
Batman of Two Worlds #1	November 2026	Batman Day special featuring two original stories: one starring the main-continuity Batman and another featuring Absolute Batman.

|}

== Intercompany crossover stories ==
Title	Issues	Initial cover date	Final cover date	Co-publisher	Notes
DC Special Series: Batman vs. the Incredible Hulk	#27	September 1981		Marvel Comics	The first Batman intercompany crossover story of them all.
Batman/Judge Dredd: Judgment on Gotham		December 1991		Fleetway Publications	
Batman versus Predator	#1 – 3	December 1991	February 1992	Dark Horse Comics	Published in two formats.
Batman/Grendel: Devil's Riddle	#1	August 1993		Comico Comics	The first issue of a two-part story.
Grendel/Batman: Devil's Masque	#2	August 1993		Comico Comics	The second issue of a two-part story.
Batman/Judge Dredd: Vendetta in Gotham		December 1993		Fleetway Publications	
Batman versus Predator II: Bloodmatch	#1 – 4	December 1993	March 1994	Dark Horse Comics	
Batman/Spawn: War Devil		spring 1994		Image Comics	
Spawn/Batman		spring 1994		Image Comics	A sequel to this story, which was going to be titled Spawn/Batman: Inner Demons, was announced but never published.
Batman/Punisher: Lake of Fire		June 1994		Marvel Comics	The semi-official beginning of the DC Comics crossover story line "KnightsEnd", which is the third and last part of the DC Comics crossover story arc Batman: Knightfall.
Punisher/Batman: Deadly Knights		October 1994		Marvel Comics	The semi-official ending of the DC Comics crossover story line "KnightsEnd", which is the third and last part of the DC Comics crossover story arc Batman: Knightfall.
Batman/Judge Dredd: The Ultimate Riddle		September 1995		Fleetway Publications	
Spider-Man and Batman: Disordered Minds		September 1995		Marvel Comics	A semi-official part of the intercompany crossover miniseries DC versus Marvel Comics/Marvel Comics vs. DC #1 – 4 (February – May 1996); it was briefly mentioned as having happened in issue #1.
Batman/Captain America		December 1996		Marvel Comics	Published under the Elseworlds logo. ISBN 1-56389-291-X
Bruce Wayne: Agent of S.H.I.E.L.D. #1		April 1996		Marvel Comics	Published under the "Amalgam Comics" imprint.
Legends of the Dark Claw #1		April 1996		Marvel Comics	Published under the "Amalgam Comics" imprint.
Batman/Grendel: Devil's Bones	#1	June 1996		Dark Horse Comics	The first issue of a two-part story.
Grendel/Batman: Devil's Dance	#2	July 1996		Dark Horse Comics	The second issue of a two-part story.
Catwoman/Vampirella: The Furies		February 1997		Harris Comics	
Batman/Aliens	#1 – 2	March 1997	April 1997	Dark Horse Comics	
Dark Claw Adventures #1		June 1997		Marvel Comics	Published under the "Amalgam Comics" imprint.
Batman & Spider-Man: New Age Dawning		October 1998		Marvel Comics	A semi-official part of the intercompany crossover miniseries Unlimited Access #1 – 4 (December 1997 – March 1998); it was briefly mentioned as having happened in issue #1.
Batman/Judge Dredd: Die Laughing	#1 – 2	January 1998		Fleetway Publications	
Azrael/Ash		January 1998		Event Comics	
Daredevil/Batman: Eye for an Eye		January 1998		Marvel Comics	
Batman versus Predator III: Blood Ties	#1 – 4	November 1997	February 1998	Dark Horse Comics	Published bi-weekly.
Batman/Hellboy/Starman	#1 – 2	January 1999	February 1999	Dark Horse Comics	
The Darkness/Batman	#1	August 1999		Top Cow	
Batman/Tarzan: Claws of the Cat-woman	#1 – 4	September 1999	December 1999	Dark Horse Comics	
Joker/Mask	#1 – 4	May 2000	August 2000	Dark Horse Comics	
Ghost/Batgirl: The Resurrection Machine	#1 – 4	August 2000	December 2000	Dark Horse Comics	
Batman/Daredevil: King of New York		December 2000		Marvel Comics	
Batman/Deathblow: After the Fire	#1 – 3	March 2002	August 2002	WildStorm	
Batman/Aliens II	#1 – 3	December 2002	February 2003	Dark Horse Comics	
Batman/Danger Girl		February 2005		WildStorm	
Batman/The Spirit		January 2007			
Superman and Batman versus Aliens and Predator	#1 – 2	March 2007	April 2007	Dark Horse Comics	
Batman '66 Meets the Green Hornet	#1 – 6	August 2014	January 2015	Dynamite Entertainment	
Batman '66 Meets the Man from U.N.C.L.E.	#1 – 6	February 2016	July 2016		
Batman '66 Meets Steed and Mrs. Peel	#1 – 6	September 2016	February 2017	Boom! Studios	
Batman '66 Meets the Legion of Super Heroes	#1	September 2017			
Batman '66 Meets Wonder Woman '77	#1 – 6	March 2017	August 2017		
Archie Meets Batman '66	#1 – 6	July 2018	December 2018	Archie Comics	
Batman/Teenage Mutant Ninja Turtles	#1 – 6	November 2015	May 2016	IDW Publishing	
Batman/Teenage Mutant Ninja Turtles Adventures	#1 – 6	January 2016	July 2017	IDW Publishing	Originally was going to be titled Batman/TMNT Adventures. This is a separate story line from the series of three crossover stories also featuring these characters (see above and below) and is both based on, and connected to, Batman: The Animated Series.
Batman/Teenage Mutant Ninja Turtles II	#1 – 6	February 2018	June 2018	IDW Publishing	
Batman/Teenage Mutant Ninja Turtles III	#1 – 6	May 2019	December 2019	IDW Publishing	
Batman/The Shadow	#1 – 6	April 2017	September 2017	Dynamite Entertainment	A series of two previous crossover stories also featuring these two characters, but taking place in the Pre-Crisis universe of Earth-One, was chronicled in Batman #253 (November 1973) and 259 (November – December 1974).
The Shadow/Batman	#1 – 6	October 2017	March 2018	Dynamite Entertainment	
Harley and Ivy Meet Betty and Veronica	#1 – 6	December 2017	May 2018	Archie Comics	
Batman/The Maxx: Arkham Dreams	#1 – 5	October 2018	November 2020	IDW Publishing	Issues #1 and 2 were both cover dated October 2018, issue #3 was cover dated December 2018, issue #4 was cover dated October 2020 and issue #5 was cover dated November 2020.
Batman/The Maxx: Arkham Dreams - The Lost Years Compendium	#1	September 2020		IDW Publishing	This issue was made to fill in the two-years-long gap between issues #3 and 4 of the above miniseries.
Batman/Spawn		February 2023		Image Comics	This story is a separate one and is in no way connected to either of the preceding two Batman/Spawn stories cover dated spring 1994 (see above).
Batman/Dylan Dog	#1 – 3	May 2024		Sergio Bonelli Editore	
Batman/Deadpool		September 2025		Marvel Comics	

== Collected editions ==
Numerous Batman stories have been reprinted as collected editions. This section lists only reprints from ongoing series, miniseries, etc. All of these stories have been issued in trade paperback format unless noted otherwise.

=== DC Archive Editions ===
All DC Archive Editions were hardcover only and printed on high quality archival paper.

Title	Material collected	Publication date	ISBN
Batman Archives Vol. 1	Stories from Detective Comics #27–50	November 1997	HC: 978-0-930289-60-7
Batman Archives Vol. 2	Stories from Detective Comics #51–70	November 1997	HC: 978-1-56389-000-0
Batman Archives Vol. 3	Stories from Detective Comics #71–86	November 1997	HC: 978-1-56389-099-4
Batman Archives Vol. 4	Stories from Detective Comics #87–102	December 1998	HC: 978-1-56389-414-5
Batman Archives Vol. 5	Stories from Detective Comics #103–119	April 2001	HC: 978-1-56389-725-2
Batman Archives Vol. 6	Stories from Detective Comics #120–135	August 2005	HC: 978-1-4012-0409-9
Batman Archives Vol. 7	Stories from Detective Comics #136–154	November 2007	HC: 978-1-4012-1493-7
Batman Archives Vol. 8	Stories from Detective Comics #155–170	July 2012	HC: 978-1-4012-3376-1
Batman: The Dark Knight Archives Vol. 1	Stories from Batman #1–4	November 1997	HC: 978-0-930289-60-7
Batman: The Dark Knight Archives Vol. 2	Stories from Batman #5–8	November 1997	HC: 978-1-56389-183-0
Batman: The Dark Knight Archives Vol. 3	Stories from Batman #9–12	June 2000	HC: 978-1-56389-615-6
Batman: The Dark Knight Archives Vol. 4	Stories from Batman #13–16	August 2003	HC: 978-1-56389-983-6
Batman: The Dark Knight Archives Vol. 5	Stories from Batman #17–20	November 2006	HC: 978-1-4012-0778-6
Batman: The Dark Knight Archives Vol. 6	Stories from Batman #21–25	December 2009	HC: 978-1-4012-2547-6
Batman: The Dark Knight Archives Vol. 7	Stories from Batman #26–31	December 2010	HC: 978-1-4012-2894-1
Batman: The Dark Knight Archives Vol. 8	Stories from Batman #32–37	January 2013	HC: 978-1-4012-3744-8
Batman: The Dynamic Duo Archives Vol. 1	Stories from Batman #164–166; Detective Comics #327–333	March 2003	HC: 978-1-56389-932-4
Batman: The Dynamic Duo Archives Vol. 2	Stories from Batman #168–171; Detective Comics #334–339	June 2006	HC: 978-1-4012-0772-4
Batman: The World's Finest Comics Archives Vol. 1	Stories from World's Finest Comics #1–16	October 2002	HC: 978-1-56389-819-8
Batman: The World's Finest Comics Archives Vol. 2	Stories from World's Finest Comics #17–32	January 2005	HC: 978-1-4012-0163-0
World's Finest Comics Archives Vol. 1	Stories from Superman #76; World's Finest Comics #71–85	March 1999	HC: 978-1-56389-488-6
World's Finest Comics Archives Vol. 2	Stories from World's Finest Comics #86–101	January 2002	HC: 978-1-56389-743-6
World's Finest Comics Archives Vol. 3	Stories from World's Finest Comics #102–116	September 2005	HC: 978-1-4012-0411-2

=== The Batman Chronicles ===
The Batman Chronicles book series planned to reprint every Batman adventure in color, in chronological order, and in affordable trade paperbacks, but was cancelled before it could do so. It is not to be confused with the also now-cancelled comic book series of the same name.

Title	Material collected	Publication date	ISBN
The Batman Chronicles Vol. 1	Stories from Detective Comics #27–38; Batman #1	April 2005	SC: 978-1-4012-0445-7
The Batman Chronicles Vol. 2	Stories from Detective Comics #39–45; Batman #2–3; New York World's Fair Comics #2	September 2006	SC: 978-1-4012-0790-8
The Batman Chronicles Vol. 3	Stories from Detective Comics #46–50; Batman #4–5; World's Best Comics #1	May 2007	SC: 978-1-4012-1347-3
The Batman Chronicles Vol. 4	Series from Detective Comics #51–56; World's Finest Comics #2–3; Batman #6–7	October 2007	SC: 978-1-4012-1462-3
The Batman Chronicles Vol. 5	Stories from Detective Comics #57–61; World's Finest Comics #4; Batman #8–9	April 2008	SC: 978-1-4012-1682-5
The Batman Chronicles Vol. 6	Stories from Detective Comics #62–66; World's Finest Comics #5–6; Batman #10–11	October 2008	SC: 978-1-4012-1961-1
The Batman Chronicles Vol. 7	Stories from Detective Comics #67–70; World's Finest Comics #7; Batman #12–13	March 2009	SC: 978-1-4012-2134-8
The Batman Chronicles Vol. 8	Stories from Detective Comics #71–74; World's Finest Comics #8–9; Batman #14–15	October 2009	SC: 978-1-4012-2484-4
The Batman Chronicles Vol. 9	Stories from Detective Comics #75–77; World's Finest Comics #10; Batman #16–17	March 2010	SC: 978-1-4012-2645-9
The Batman Chronicles Vol. 10	Stories from Detective Comics #78–81; World's Finest Comics #11; Batman #18–19	December 2010	SC: 978-1-4012-2895-8
The Batman Chronicles Vol. 11	Stories from Detective Comics #82–85; World's Finest Comics #12; Batman #20–21	January 2013	SC: 978-1-4012-3739-4

=== Showcase Presents ===
All Showcase Presents collections were large (over 500 pages) softcover-only and black-and-white-only reprints.

Title	Material collected	Publication date	ISBN
Showcase Presents Batman Vol. 1	Stories from Detective Comics #327–342; Batman #164–174	August 2006	SC: 978-1-4012-1086-1
Showcase Presents Batman Vol. 2	Stories from Detective Comics #343–358; Batman #175, 177–181, 183–184, 188	June 2007	SC: 978-1-4012-1362-6
Showcase Presents Batman Vol. 3	Stories from Detective Comics #359–375; Batman #189–192, 194–197, 199–201	July 2008	SC: 978-1-4012-1719-8
Showcase Presents Batman Vol. 4	Stories from Detective Comics #376–390; Batman #202–215	July 2009	SC: 978-1-4012-2314-4
Showcase Presents Batman Vol. 5	Stories from Detective Comics #391–404; Batman #216–228	December 2011	SC: 978-1-4012-3236-8
Showcase Presents Batman Vol. 6	Stories from Detective Comics #408–426; Batman #229–244	January 2016	SC: 978-1-4012-5153-6
Showcase Presents Batman and the Outsiders Vol. 1	Stories from Batman and the Outsiders #1–19, Annual #1; The Brave and the Bold #200; The New Teen Titans #37	September 2007	SC: 978-1-4012-1546-0
Showcase Presents The Brave and the Bold: Batman Team-Ups Vol. 1	Stories from The Brave and the Bold #59, 64, 67–71, 74–87	January 2007	SC: 978-1-4012-1209-4
Showcase Presents The Brave and The Bold: Batman Team-Ups Vol. 2	Stories from The Brave and the Bold #88–108	December 2007	SC: 978-1-4012-1675-7
Showcase Presents The Brave and The Bold: Batman Team-Ups Vol. 3	Stories from The Brave and the Bold #109–134	December 2008	SC: 978-1-4012-1985-7

=== DC Finest trade paperbacks ===
All DC Finest collections are large softcover-only full-color reprints.

Title	Material collected	Publication date	ISBN
DC Finest: Batman: Year One & Two	Stories from Batman #401-412, Annual #11, Detective Comics #568-5789	November 2024	SC: 978-1-77952-835-3
DC Finest: Batman: The Killing Joke and Other Stories	Stories from Batman #413-422, Batman: The Killing Joke, Detective Comics #580-589, Batman: Son of the Demon	May 2025	SC: 978-1-7995-0145-9
DC Finest: Batman: Red Skies	Stories from Batman #386-400, Annual #10, Detective Comics #553-567, Secret Origins #6	September 2025	SC: 978-1-7995-0273-9
DC Finest: Batman: The Case of the Chemical Syndicate	Stories from Detective Comics #27-52, Batman #1-5	January 2026	SC: 978-1-7995-0670-6
DC Finest: Batman: A Death in the Family	Stories from Batman #423-429, Annual #12, Batman: The Cult #1-4, Detective Comics #590-590, Annual #1	April 2026	SC: 978-1-7995-0857-1
DC Finest: Batman: Blind Justice	Stories from Batman #430-435, Detective Comics #596-603, batman Annual #13, Detective Comics Annual #2, stories from Secret Origins #36 and #39	July 2026	SC: 978-1-7995-1316-2
DC Finest: Batman: The Demon Lives Again!	Stories from Batman #231-245, Detective Comics #410-429	September 2026	SC: 978-1-7995-1030-7
DC Finest: Batman: The Curse of Crime Alley	Stories from Batman #307-324, Detective Comics #482-490, DC Special Series #21, The Brave and the Bold #159	November 2026	SC: 978-1-7995-0961-5

=== DC Compact Comics ===
All DC Compact Comics collections are full-color paperback reprints.

Title	Material collected	Publication date	ISBN
Batman: The Dark Knight Returns	Batman: The Dark Knight Returns #1-4	April 2026	SC: 978-1-7995-0786-4
Batman: Arkham Asylum	Batman: Arkham Asylum - A Serious House on Serious Earth	September 2025	SC: 978-1-7995-0699-7
Gotham by Gaslight	Batman: Gotham by Gaslight	January 2026	SC: 978-1-7995-0665-2
Batman: The Long Halloween	Batman: The Long Halloween #1-13	October 2025	SC: 978-1-7995-0288-3
Batman: Hush	Batman #608-619	August 2024	SC: 978-1-77952-726-4
Batman: The Court of Owls Saga	Batman (vol. 2) #1-11	June 2024	SC: 978-1-77952-727-1
Batman: White Knight	Batman: White Knight #1-8	February 2026	SC: 978-1-7995-0741-3

=== Batman newspaper comic strip collections ===
The following collections reprinted the two Batman newspaper comic strips of 1943–1946 and 1966–1973.

Title	Material collected	Publication date	ISBN
Batman and Robin (1943–1946)
Batman: The Dailies 1943–1944	Batman and Robin daily comic strip reprints	October 1, 1990	SC: 978-0-87816-119-5
Batman: The Dailies 1944–1945	Batman and Robin daily comic strip reprints	September 1, 1991	SC: 978-0-87816-130-0
Batman: The Dailies 1945–1946	Batman and Robin daily comic strip reprints	January 1, 1991	SC: 978-0-87816-147-8
Batman: The Sunday Classics 1943–46	Batman and Robin Sunday comic strip reprints	March 1, 1991	SC: 978-0-87816-148-5
Batman: The Dailies 1943–1946	Batman and Robin daily comic strip reprints	April 12, 2007	HC: 978-1-4027-4717-5
Batman: The Sunday Classics 1943–46	Batman and Robin Sunday comic strip reprints	April 12, 2007	HC: 978-1-4027-4718-2
Batman with Robin the Boy Wonder (1966–1973)
Batman 1966–1967: Dailies and Sundays Complete	Batman with Robin the Boy Wonder daily and Sunday comic strip reprints	April 8, 2014	HC: 978-1-61377-845-6
Batman 1968–1969: Dailies and Sundays Complete	Batman with Robin the Boy Wonder daily and Sunday comic strip reprints	February 3, 2015	HC: 978-1-63140-121-3
Batman 1969–1972: Dailies and Sundays	Batman with Robin the Boy Wonder daily and Sunday comic strip reprints	November 15, 2016	HC: 978-1-63140-263-0

=== Modern Batman ===
The following trade paperbacks are stories that run through the "contemporary" books of the Batman family. The earliest trade paperback, chronologically speaking, is Frank Miller's "Batman: Year One" story arc, which rebirthed the character in the Modern Age, retelling the first year of his existence, including who he was and how he came to be. These stories are from comic books that are still being published and are, in a sense, still ongoing. They are listed here in the chronology of the story lines, rather than the publication dates of either the original comics or collections.

The two trade paperback series Batman: The Caped Crusader and Batman: The Dark Knight Detective reprint most of the Post-Crisis issues of Batman and Detective Comics, respectively. However, both Caped Crusader and Dark Knight Detective feature six major omissions: Dark Knight Detective omits Detective Comics #575–578 ("Batman: Year Two") and Caped Crusader omits the entire Max Alan Collins Batman run and the fill-in Batman issues that were published in between the Collins and Jim Starlin runs (the majority of which were previously reprinted in Batman: Second Chances, along with the Collins Penguin story in Batman Annual #11). Caped Crusader also omits several major Batman stories in its run, most notably Alan Moore's Clayface III story from Batman Annual #11, Batman #426–429 ("A Death in the Family"), and Batman #440–442/The New Titans #60–61 ("A Lonely Place of Dying"). Five of these six omissions are also referred to in the two series' respective sections below.

Title	Material collected	Publication date	ISBN
Batman: Year One	Batman #404–407	1988 2005; 2007	HC: 978-1-4012-0690-1 SC: 978-1-4012-0752-6
Catwoman: Her Sister's Keeper	Catwoman #1–4	1992	SC: 978-0-446-39366-9
Batman: The Man Who Laughs	Batman: The Man Who Laughs; Detective Comics #784–786	2008; 2009	HC: 978-1-4012-1622-1 SC: 978-1-4012-1626-9
Batman: Shaman	Legends of the Dark Knight #1–5	1998; 2016; 2019	SC: 978-1-4012-0752-6 Second SC: 978-1-4012-5805-4; Third SC: 978-1-4012-8573-9
Dark Moon Rising: Batman and the Monster Men	Dark Moon Rising: Batman and the Monster Men #1–6	2006	SC: 978-1-4012-1091-5
Batman: Prey	Legends of the Dark Knight #11–15	1992; 2012; 2012	SC: 978-0-930289-68-3 Second SC: 978-1-78116-357-3; Third SC: 978-1-4012-3515-4
Dark Moon Rising: Batman and the Mad Monk	Dark Moon Rising: Batman and the Mad Monk #1–6	2007	SC: 978-1-4012-1281-0
Batman: Snow	Batman: Legends of the Dark Knight #192–196	2007	SC: 978-1-4012-1265-0
Batman: Dead to Rights	Batman: Confidential #22–25, 29–30	2010	SC: 978-1-4012-2925-2
Batman: Four of a Kind	Detective Comics Annual #8; Batman: Shadow of the Bat Annual #3; Batman: Legends of the Dark Knight Annual #5; Batman Annual #19	1998	SC: 978-1-56389-413-8
Batman: Venom	Legends of the Dark Knight #16–20	1993; 2012	SC: 978-1-56389-101-4 Second SC: 978-1-4012-3383-9
Batman: Collected Legends of the Dark Knight	Legends of the Dark Knight #32–34, Batman: Legends of the Dark Knight #38, 42–43	1994	SC: 978-1-56389-147-2
Batman: Other Realms	Legends of the Dark Knight #35–36, Batman: Legends of the Dark Knight #76–78	1998	SC: 978-1-56389-420-6
Batman: Dark Legends	Batman: Legends of the Dark Knight #39–40, 50, 52–54	1996	SC: 978-1-56389-266-0
Batman: Monsters	Batman: Legends of the Dark Knight #71–73, 83–84, 89–90	2009	SC: 978-1-4012-2494-3
Batman: Gothic	Legends of the Dark Knight #6–10	2007; 2015	SC: 978-1-4012-1549-1 Second SC: 978-1-4012-5516-9
Batman: Terror	Batman: Legends of the Dark Knight #137–141	2003; 2012; 2012	SC: 978-1-4012-0125-8 Second SC: 978-1-78116-357-3; Third SC: 978-1-4012-3515-4
Batman: Going Sane	Batman: Legends of the Dark Knight #65–68, 200	2008	SC: 978-1-4012-1821-8
Batman: Blink	Batman: Legends of the Dark Knight #156–158, 164–167; There are two stories in this volume: "Blink" (#156–158) and its sequel, "Don't Blink" (#164–167).	2015	SC: 978-1-4012-1265-0
Batman: Year Two; Batman: Year Two – Fear the Reaper	Detective Comics #575–578 (the revised and retitled version also includes Batman: Full Circle, the sequel to Batman: Year Two (see One-shots and graphic novels above)); After the events of Zero Hour: Crisis in Time! #4–0 (all issues cover dated September 1994), this story is no longer canon.	1990; 2002	SC: 978-0-930289-49-2 Second SC: 978-1-56389-967-6
Batman: Haunted Knight	Batman: Legends of the Dark Knight Halloween Special; Batman: Madness – A Legends of the Dark Knight Halloween Special; Batman: Ghosts – A Legends of the Dark Knight Halloween Special	1996; 1997	SC: 978-1-56389-273-8
Batman: The Long Halloween	Batman: The Long Halloween #1–13	1999; 1999	HC: 978-1-56389-427-5 SC: 978-1-4012-3259-7
Batman: Dark Victory	Batman: Dark Victory #0–13	2001; 2002	HC: 978-1-56389-738-2 SC: 978-1-56389-868-6
Catwoman: When in Rome	Catwoman: When in Rome #1–6	2005; 2007	HC: 978-1-4012-0432-7 SC: 978-1-4012-0717-5
Batman: Faces	Legends of the Dark Knight #28–30	1995; 2008	SC: 978-1-56389-126-7 Second SC: 978-1-4012-1820-1
Batman: Full Circle	After the events of Zero Hour: Crisis in Time! #4–0 (all issues cover dated September 1994), this story is no longer canon.	1991	SC: 978-0-930289-98-0
Batman: Fortunate Son		1999; 1999	HC: 978-1-56389-578-4 SC: 978-1-4012-0717-5
Batman: Second Chances	Batman #402–403, 408–416, Annual #11; This book does not include the story Batman: Year One, which was collected separately (see above).	2015	SC: 978-1-4012-5518-3
Batman: Ten Nights of the Beast	Batman #417–420	1994	SC: 978-1-56389-155-7
Batman: The Cat and the Bat	Batman Confidential #17–21	2009	SC: 978-1-4012-2496-7
Batman: The Cult	Batman: The Cult #1–4	1991; 2009	SC: 978-1-85286-373-9 Second SC: 978-0-930289-85-0
Batman: The Killing Joke		1988; 2008	SC: 978-0-930289-45-4 HC: 978-1-4012-1667-2
Batman: A Death in the Family	Batman #426–429	2011	SC: 978-1-4012-3274-0
Batman: A Lonely Place of Dying	Batman #440, The New Titans #60, Batman #441, The New Titans #61 and Batman #442 (the issues are listed here in order of occurrence)	1990	SC: 978-0-930289-63-8
Batman: Blind Justice	Detective Comics #598–600	2005	SC: 978-1-56389-047-5
The Many Deaths of the Batman	Batman #433–435	1992	SC: 978-1-56389-033-8
Batman: Dark Knight, Dark City	Batman #452–454; Detective Comics #629–633	2015	SC: 978-1-4012-5127-7
Robin: A Hero Reborn	Batman #455–457; Robin #1–5	1991	SC: 978-1-56389-029-1
Robin Vol. 1: Reborn	Batman #455–457, Detective Comics #618–621; Robin #1–5	2015	SC: 978-1-4012-5857-3
Robin: Tragedy and Triumph	Detective Comics #618–621; Robin II: The Joker's Wild! #1–4	1993	SC: 978-1-56389-078-9
Robin Vol. 2: Triumphant	Batman #465, 467–469; Robin II: The Joker's Wild! #1–4; Robin III: Cry of the Huntress #1–4	2016	SC: 978-1-4012-6089-7
Batman: The Last Arkham	Batman: Shadow of the Bat #1–4	1995	SC: 978-1-56389-190-8
Batman: Sword of Azrael	Batman: Sword of Azrael #1–4	1993	SC: 978-1-56389-100-7
Azrael Vol. 1: Fallen Angel	Batman: Sword of Azrael #1–4; a story from Showcase ’94 #10; Azrael #1–7	2016	SC: 978-1-4012-6060-6
Batman: Knightfall Vol. 1	Batman: Vengeance of Bane #1; Batman #491–500; Detective Comics #659–666; stories from Showcase '93 #7–8; Batman: Shadow of the Bat #16–18	2012	SC: 978-1-4012-3379-2
Batman: Knightfall Vol. 2 - Knightquest	Detective Comics #667–675; Batman: Shadow of the Bat #19–20, #24–28; Batman #501–508; Catwoman (vol. 2) #6–7; Robin (vol. 4) #7	2012	SC: 978-1-4012-3536-9
Batman: Knightfall Vol. 3 - KnightsEnd	Batman #509–510, 512–514; Batman: Shadow of the Bat #29–30, 32–34; Detective Comics #676–677, 679–681; Batman: Legends of the Dark Knight #62–63; Robin (vol. 4) #8–9, 11–13; Catwoman (vol. 2) #12–13	2012	SC: 978-1-4012-3721-9
Batman: Prelude to Knightfall	Batman: Vengeance of Bane #1; Detective Comics #654–658; Batman #484–491; plus extras	September 11, 2018	SC: 978-1-4012-8422-0
Batman: Knightfall 25th Anniversary Edition Vol. 1	Detective Comics #659–663; Batman #492–497; plus extras	September 18, 2018	SC: 978-1-4012-8429-9
Batman: Knightfall 25th Anniversary Edition Vol. 2	Detective Comics #664–666; Batman #498–500; Batman: Shadow of the Bat #16–18; stories from Showcase '93 #7–8; plus extras	September 25, 2018	SC: 978-1-4012-8439-8
Batman: Knightquest – The Crusade Vol. 1	Detective Comics #667–670; Batman #501–504; Batman: Shadow of the Bat #19–20; Catwoman (vol. 2) #6–7; Robin (vol. 4) #1–2; plus extras	October 2, 2018	SC: 978-1-4012-8450-3
Batman: Knightquest – The Crusade Vol. 2	Detective Comics #671–675; Batman #505–508; Batman: Shadow of the Bat #24–28; a story from Showcase '94 #7; plus extras	October 9, 2018	SC: 978-1-4012-8458-9
Batman: Knightquest – The Search	Batman: Legends of the Dark Knight #59–61; Batman: Shadow of the Bat #21–23; Robin (vol. 4) #7; Justice League Task Force #5–6; plus extras	November 27, 2018	SC: 978-1-4012-8501-2
Batman: KnightsEnd	Detective Comics #676–677; Batman #509–510; Batman: Legends of the Dark Knight #62–63; Batman: Shadow of the Bat #29–30; Catwoman (vol. 2) #8–9; Robin (vol. 4) #8–9; a story from Showcase '94 #10; plus extras	December 4, 2018	SC: 978-1-4012-8518-0
Batman: Zero Hour	Detective Comics #0, 678; Batman #0, 511; Batman: Legends of the Dark Knight #0; Batman: Shadow of the Bat #0, 31; Catwoman (vol. 2) #0, 14; Robin (vol. 4) #0, 10	2017	SC: 978-1-4012-7258-6
Batman: Prodigal	Detective Comics #679–681; Batman #512–514; Batman: Shadow of the Bat #32–34; Robin (vol. 4) #0, 11–13; plus extras	January 8, 2019	SC: 978-1-4012-8560-9
Batman: Troika	Detective Comics #682; Batman #515; Batman: Shadow of the Bat #35; Robin (vol. 4) #14; Nightwing: Alfred's Return #1; Batman: Vengeance of Bane II - The Redemption; plus extras	February 5, 2019	SC: 978-1-4012-8587-6
Batman: Contagion	Azrael #15–16; Batman #529; Batman: Shadow of the Bat #48–49; Catwoman (vol. 2) #31–35; Detective Comics #695–696; Robin (vol. 4) #27–30; short stories from The Batman Chronicles #4	2016	SC: 978-1-4012-6068-2
Batman: Legacy Vol. 1	Batman #533; Batman: Shadow of the Bat #53; Catwoman (vol. 2) #33–35; Detective Comics #697–700; Robin (vol. 4) #31	2017	SC: 978-1-4012-7202-9
Batman: Legacy Vol. 2	Batman #534; Batman: Bane; Batman: Bane of the Demon #1–4; Batman: Shadow of the Bat #54; Detective Comics #701–702; Robin (vol. 4) #32–33	2018	SC: 978-1-4012-7761-1
Batman: Knight Out	Detective Comics #703–718	2020	HC: 978-1-77950-669-6
Batman: Cataclysm	Batman #553–554; Detective Comics #719–721; Batman: Shadow of the Bat #73–74; Nightwing (vol. 2) #19–20; Catwoman (vol. 2) #56-57; Robin (vol. 4) #52-53; Azrael #40; Batman/Spoiler/Huntress: Blunt Trauma #1; Batman: Blackgate - Isle of Men #1; Batman: Arkham Asylum - Tales of Madness #1; short stories from The Batman Chronicles #12	2015	SC: 978-1-4012-5515-2
Batman: Road to No Man's Land Vol. 1	Batman #555–559; Batman: Shadow of the Bat #75–79; Detective Comics #722, 724–726; Robin (vol. 4) #54; short stories from The Batman Chronicles #14	2015	SC: 978-1-4012-5827-6
Batman: Road to No Man's Land Vol. 2	Detective Comics #727–729; Batman #560–562; Batman: Shadow of the Bat #80–82; Azrael: Agent of the Bat #47–50; Batman: No Man's Land Secret Files and Origins #1; short stories from The Batman Chronicles #15	2016	SC: 978-1-4012-6063-7
Batman: No Man's Land – No Law and a New Order	Batman: No Man's Land #1; Batman: Shadow of the Bat #83; Batman #563; Detective Comics #730; the covers of all four issues	1999	
Batman: No Man's Land Vol. 1	Batman: No Man's Land #1; Batman: Shadow of the Bat #83–86; Batman #563–566; Detective Comics #730–733; Azrael: Agent of the Bat #51–55; Batman: Legends of the Dark Knight #117–118; short stories from The Batman Chronicles #16	2011	SC: 978-1-4012-3228-3
Batman: No Man's Land Vol. 2	Batman #567–568; Detective Comics #734–735; Batman: Legends of the Dark Knight #119–121; Batman: Shadow of the Bat #87–88; Robin (vol. 4) #67; Nightwing (vol. 2) #35–37; Catwoman (vol. 2) #72–74; Azrael: Agent of the Bat #56–57; Young Justice: No Man's Land #1; short stories from The Batman Chronicles #17	2012	SC: 978-1-4012-3380-8
Batman: No Man's Land Vol. 3	Batman #569–571; Detective Comics #736–738; Azrael: Agent of the Bat #58; Batman: Legends of the Dark Knight #122–124; Batman: Shadow of the Bat #90–92; Robin (vol. 4) #68–72; Batman: No Man's Land Secret Files and Origins #1	2012	SC: 978-1-4012-3456-0
Batman: No Man's Land Vol. 4	Batman #572–574; Batman: Shadow of the Bat #93–94; Detective Comics #739–741; Azrael: Agent of the Bat #59–61; Batman: Legends of the Dark Knight #125–126; Robin (vol. 4) #73; short stories from The Batman Chronicles #18	2012	SC: 978-1-4012-3564-2
Batman: New Gotham Vol. 1	Detective Comics #742–753	2017	SC: 978-1-4012-6367-6
Batman: Evolution	Detective Comics #743-750	2001	SC: 978-1-56389-726-9
Batman: Officer Down	Batman #587; Robin (vol. 4) #86; Birds of Prey #27; Catwoman (vol. 2) #90; Nightwing (vol. 2) #53; Detective Comics #754; Batman: Gotham Knights #13	2001	SC: 978-1-56389-787-0
Batman: New Gotham Vol. 2	Detective Comics #755–765	2018	SC: 978-1-4012-7794-9
Batman: Gotham Knights – Transference	Batman: Gotham Knights #1–12	2020	SC: 978-1-4012-9407-6
Batman: Gotham Knights – Contested	Batman: Gotham Knights #14–24, 29	2021	SC: 978-1-77950-306-0
Batman: False Faces	Batman #588–590; Detective Comics #787; Wonder Woman (vol. 2) #160–161; a story from Batman: Gotham City Secret Files and Origins #1	2008; 2009	HC: 978-1-4012-1640-5 SC: 978-1-84576-721-1
Batman: Bruce Wayne – Murderer? (new edition)	Batman: The 10-Cent Adventure; Detective Comics #766–767; Batgirl (vol. 2) #24, 27; Nightwing (vol. 2) #65–66, 68–69; Batman: Gotham Knights #25–28; Birds of Prey #39–41, 43; Robin (vol. 4) #98–99; Batman #599–602	2014	SC: 978-1-4012-4683-9
Batman: Bruce Wayne – Fugitive (new edition)	Batman #603–607; Detective Comics #768–775; Batman: Gotham Knights #29–32; Batgirl (vol. 2) #29, 33	2014	SC: 978-1-4012-4682-2
Batman: Bruce Wayne – Murderer? (first edition)	Batman: The 10-Cent Adventure; Detective Comics #766–767; Batgirl (vol. 2) #24; Nightwing (vol. 2) #65–66; Batman: Gotham Knights #25–26; Birds of Prey #39–40; Robin (vol. 4) #98–99; Batman #599–600	2002	SC: 978-1-56389-913-3
Batman: Bruce Wayne – Fugitive Vol. 1	Batman #601, 603; Batman: Gotham Knights #27–28; Batgirl (vol. 2) #27, 29; Birds of Prey #41, 43; Nightwing (vol. 2) #68–69	2002	SC: 978-1-56389-933-1
Batman: Bruce Wayne – Fugitive Vol. 2	Detective Comics #768–772; Batman: Gotham Knights #31; Batman #605	2003	SC: 978-1-56389-947-8
Batman: Bruce Wayne – Fugitive Vol. 3	Detective Comics #773–775; Batman #606–607; Batgirl (vol. 2) #33	2003	SC: 978-1-4012-0079-4
Batman: Hush	Batman #608–619	2009	SC: 978-1-4012-2317-5
Batman: Death and the Maidens	Batman: Death and the Maidens #1–9; Detective Comics #783	2004	SC: 978-1-4012-0234-7
Batman: Broken City	Batman #620–625	2004; 2005	HC: 978-1-4012-0133-3 SC: 978-1-4012-0214-9
Batman: As the Crow Flies	Batman #626–630	2004	SC: 978-1-4012-0344-3
Batman: Hush Returns	Batman: Gotham Knights #50–55, 66	2006	SC: 978-1-4012-0900-1
Batman: War Games Book One	Batgirl (vol. 2) #53, 55; Batman #631; Batman: The 12-Cent Adventure; Batman: Legends of the Dark Knight #182, Batman: Gotham Knights #56; Catwoman (vol. 2) #34; Detective Comics #790–797; Nightwing (vol. 2) #96; Robin (vol. 4) #126–129; a story from Solo #10	2015	SC: 978-1-4012-5813-9
Batman: War Games Book Two	Batgirl (vol. 2) #56–57; Batman #632–634, 642–644; Batman: Legends of the Dark Knight #183–184; Batman: Gotham Knights #57–58; Batman Allies Secret Files and Origins 2005; Batman Villains Secret Files and Origins 2005; Catwoman (vol. 2) #35–36; Detective Comics #798–800, 809–810; Nightwing (vol. 2) #97–98; Robin (vol. 4) #130–131	2016	SC: 978-1-4012-6070-5
Batman: City of Crime	Detective Comics #800–808, 811–814	2006	SC: 978-1-4012-0897-4
Batman: Under the Red Hood	Batman #635–641, 645–650, Annual #25	2011	SC: 978-1-4012-3145-3
Batman: War Crimes	Detective Comics #809; Batman #643; Detective Comics #810; Batman #644 (again, the issues are listed here in order of occurrence)	2006	SC: 978-1-4012-0903-2
Batman: Face the Face	Batman #651–654; Detective Comics #817–820	2006	SC: 978-1-4012-0910-0
Batman: Detective	Detective Comics #821–826	2007	SC: 978-1-4012-1239-1
Batman and Son	Batman #655–658, 663–669, 672–675	2014	SC: 978-1-4012-4402-6
Batman: Death and the City	Detective Comics #827–834	2007	SC: 978-1-4012-1575-0
Batman: The Resurrection of Ra's al Ghul	Detective Comics #838–839; Batman #670–671, Annual #26; Nightwing (vol. 2) #138–139; Robin (vol. 4) #168–169, Annual #7	2008; 2009	HC: 978-1-4012-1785-3 SC: 978-1-4012-2032-7
Batman: Private Casebook	Detective Comics #840–845	2008; 2009	HC: 978-1-4012-2009-9 SC: 978-1-4012-2015-0
Batman: Gotham Underground	Gotham Underground #1–9	2008	SC: 978-1-4012-1928-4
Batman: Heart of Hush	Detective Comics #846–850	2009; 2010	HC: 978-1-4012-2123-2 SC: 978-1-4012-2124-9
Batman R.I.P.	Batman #676–683	2009; 2010	HC: 978-1-4012-2090-7 SC: 978-1-4012-2576-6
Batman: The Black Casebook	Stories from Detective Comics #215, 235, 247, 267; Batman #65, 86, 112, 113, 134, 156, 162; World's Finest Comics #89	2009	SC: 978-1-4012-2264-2
Batman: Streets of Gotham: Hush Money	Detective Comics #852; Batman #685; Batman: Streets of Gotham #1-4	2010	978-1-4012-2722-7
Batman: Whatever Happened to the Caped Crusader?	Batman #686; Detective Comics #853	2009; 2010	HC: 978-1-4012-2303-8 SC: 978-1-4012-2724-1
Batman: Battle for the Cowl	Batman: Battle for the Cowl #1–3; Batman: Battle for the Cowl – Gotham Gazette: Batman Dead? #1; Batman: Battle for the Cowl – Gotham Gazette: Batman Alive? #1	2009; 2010	HC: 978-1-4012-2416-5 SC: 978-1-4012-2417-2
Batman: Battle for the Cowl Companion	Batman: Battle for the Cowl – Commissioner Gordon #1; Batman: Battle for the Cowl – Arkham Asylum #1; Batman: Battle for the Cowl – The Underground #1; Batman: Battle for the Cowl – Man-Bat #1; Batman: Battle for the Cowl – The Network #1	2009	SC: 978-1-84856-507-4
Oracle: The Cure	Oracle: The Cure #1–3; Birds of Prey #126–127	2010	SC: 978-1-4012-2603-9
Azrael: Death's Dark Knight	Azrael: Death's Dark Knight #1–3	2010	SC: 978-1-4012-2707-4
Batman: Long Shadows	Batman #687–691	2010; 2011	HC: 978-1-4012-2719-7 SC: 978-1-4012-2720-3
Batman and Robin: Batman Reborn	Batman and Robin #1–6	2010; 2011	HC: 978-1-4012-2566-7 SC: 978-1-4012-2987-0
Batman and Robin: Batman vs. Robin	Batman and Robin #7–12	2010	HC: 978-1-4012-2833-0
Batman: Life After Death	Batman #692–699	2010	HC: 978-1-4012-2834-7
Batman: Arkham Reborn	Batman: Battle for the Cowl – Arkham Asylum #1; Arkham Reborn #1–3; Detective Comics #864–865	2010	SC: 978-1-4012-2708-1
Batman: Time and the Batman	Batman #700–703	2011	HC: 978-1-4012-2989-4
Batman: The Return of Bruce Wayne	Batman: The Return of Bruce Wayne #1–6	2011	HC: 978-1-4012-2968-9
Batman: Bruce Wayne – The Road Home	Bruce Wayne: The Road Home – Batman and Robin #1; Bruce Wayne: The Road Home – Red Robin #1; Bruce Wayne: The Road Home – Batgirl #1; Bruce Wayne: The Road Home – Outsiders #1; Bruce Wayne: The Road Home – Catwoman #1; Bruce Wayne: The Road Home – Commissioner Gordon #1; Bruce Wayne: The Road Home – Oracle #1; Bruce Wayne: The Road Home – Ra's al Ghul #1	2011	HC: 978-1-4012-3081-4
Batman and Robin: Batman and Robin Must Die!	Batman and Robin #13–16; Batman: The Return #1	2011	HC: 978-1-4012-3091-3
Batman: Eye of the Beholder	Batman #704–707, 710–712	2011	HC: 978-1-4012-3273-3
Batman: The Black Mirror	Detective Comics #871–881	2011	HC: 978-1-4012-3206-1
Batman: The Dark Knight Vol. 1 – Golden Dawn	Batman: The Dark Knight #1–5; Batman: The Return #1; Superman/Batman #75	2012	SC: 978-1-4012-3215-3
Batman and Robin: Dark Knight vs. White Knight	Batman and Robin #17–25	2012	HC: 978-1-4012-8420-6
Batman: Gotham Shall Be Judged	Batman #708–709; Red Robin #22; Gotham City Sirens #22; Azrael #14–18	2012	SC: 978-1-4012-3378-5
Batman: Gates of Gotham	Batman: Gates of Gotham #1–5; Detective Comics Annual #12; Batman Annual #28	2012	SC: 978-1-4012-3341-9
Batman Incorporated Vol. 1	Batman Incorporated #1–8; Batman Incorporated: Leviathan Strikes! #1	2012	HC: 978-1-4012-3212-2
Batman: The Caped Crusader
Batman: The Caped Crusader Vol. 1	Batman #417–425, 430–431, Annual #12; The beginning of the Post-Crisis issues of Batman was mostly already collected in Batman: Second Chances (see above), so this series begins where that book ended. This book does not include the story Batman: A Death in the Family, which was collected separately (see above).	August 15 2018	SC: 978-1-4012-8136-6
Batman: The Caped Crusader Vol. 2	Batman #432–439, 443–444, Annual #13; This book does not include the story Batman: A Lonely Place of Dying, which was collected separately (see above).	February 13 2019	SC: 978-1-4012-8782-5
Batman: The Caped Crusader Vol. 3	Batman #445–454, Annual #14; Detective Comics #615	September 18 2019	SC: 978-1-4012-9427-4
Batman: The Caped Crusader Vol. 4	Batman #455–465, Annual #15	May 26 2020	SC: 978-1-77950-030-4
Batman: The Caped Crusader Vol. 5	Batman #466–473; Detective Comics #639–640	January 5 2021	SC: 978-1-77950-601-6
Batman: The Caped Crusader Vol. 6	Batman #475–483; Detective Comics #642	February 15 2022	SC: 978-1-77950-800-3
Batman: The Dark Knight Detective
Batman: The Dark Knight Detective Vol. 1	Detective Comics #568–574, 579–582; This book does not include the story Batman: Year Two, which was collected separately (see above).	April 4 2018	SC: 978-1-4012-7108-4
Batman: The Dark Knight Detective Vol. 2	Detective Comics #583–591, Annual #1	October 17 2018	SC: 978-1-4012-8468-8
Batman: The Dark Knight Detective Vol. 3	Detective Comics #592–600	February 12 2020	SC: 978-1-77950-101-1
Batman: The Dark Knight Detective Vol. 4	Detective Comics #601–611, Annual #2	January 19 2021	SC: 978-1-77950-749-5
Batman: The Dark Knight Detective Vol. 5	Detective Comics #612–614, 616–621, Annual #3	May 25 2021	SC: 978-1-77950-965-9
Batman: The Dark Knight Detective Vol. 6	Detective Comics #622–633	May 3 2022	SC: 978-1-77951-330-4
Batman: The Dark Knight Detective Vol. 7	Detective Comics #634–638, 641, 643, Annual #4; Batman #474; Batman: Legends of the Dark Knight #27	February 14 2023	SC: 978-1-77951-507-0
Batman: The Dark Knight Detective Vol. 8	Detective Comics #644–653, Annual #4-5	November 28 2023	SC: 978-1-77952-292-4

=== The New 52 Batman ===
In 2011, DC Comics rebooted their entire continuity. This relaunched continuity, which ran from 2011 to 2016, is known as The New 52. The Batman family of books were also rebooted. While the history and elements of this new continuity are very similar to the previous one, there are still fundamental differences between them. As such, the following collected works should be treated as a separate canonical entity. The collected works are listed in order of publication date, not in chronological order. This list includes all New 52 titles centered around Batman.

Title	Material collected	Publication date	ISBN
Batman (vol. 2)
Batman Vol. 1: The Court of Owls	Batman (vol. 2) #1–7	May 2012	HC: 978-1-4012-3541-3 SC: 978-1-4012-3542-0
Batman: Night of the Owls	All-Star Western (vol. 3) #9; Batman (vol. 2) #8–11, Annual (vol. 2) #1; Batman: The Dark Knight (vol. 2) #9; Detective Comics (vol. 2) #9; Batgirl (vol. 4) #9; Batwing #9; Birds of Prey (vol. 3) #9; Nightwing (vol. 3) #8–9; Batman and Robin (vol. 2) #9; Catwoman (vol. 4) #9; Red Hood and the Outlaws #9	February 2013	HC: 978-1-4012-3773-8 SC: 978-1-4012-4252-7
Batman Vol. 2: The City of Owls	Batman (vol. 2) #8–12, Annual (vol. 2) #1	March 2013	HC: 978-1-4012-3777-6 SC: 978-1-4012-3778-3
Batman Vol. 3: Death of the Family	Batman (vol. 2) #13–17	November 2013	HC: 978-1-4012-4234-3 SC: 978-1-4012-4602-0
The Joker: Death of the Family	Catwoman (vol. 4) #13–14; Batgirl (vol. 4) #13–16; Suicide Squad (vol. 4) #14–15; Batman and Robin (vol. 2) #15–16; Nightwing (vol. 3) #15–16; Detective Comics (vol. 2) #15–16; Red Hood and the Outlaws #15–16; Teen Titans (vol. 4) #15–16	October 2013	HC: 978-1-4012-4234-3 SC: 978-1-4012-4646-4
Batman Vol. 4: Zero Year – Secret City	Batman (vol. 2) #21–24	May 2014	HC: 978-1-4012-4508-5 SC: 978-1-4012-4933-5
Batman Vol. 5: Zero Year – Dark City	Batman (vol. 2) #25-27, 29-33	October 2014	HC: 978-1-4012-4885-7 SC: 978-1-4012-5335-6
DC Comics: Zero Year	Action Comics (vol. 2) #25; Batgirl (vol. 4) #25; Batman (vol. 2) #24–25; Batwing #25; Batwoman (vol. 2) #25; Birds of Prey (vol. 3) #25; Catwoman (vol. 4) #25; Detective Comics (vol. 2) #25; Green Arrow (vol. 6) #25; Green Lantern Corps (vol. 3) #25; Nightwing (vol. 3) #25; Red Hood and the Outlaws #25; The Flash (vol. 4) #25	November 2014	HC: 978-1-4012-4937-3 SC: 978-1-4012-5337-0
Batman Vol. 6: Graveyard Shift	Batman (vol. 2) #0, 18–20, 28, 34, Annual (vol. 2) #2	May 2015	HC: 978-1-4012-5230-4 SC: 978-1-4012-5753-8
Batman Vol. 7: Endgame	Batman (vol. 2) #35–40	September 2015	HC: 978-1-4012-5689-0 SC: 978-1-4012-6116-0
The Joker: Endgame	Batman (vol. 2) #35–40, Annual (vol. 2) #3; Gotham Academy: Endgame #1; Batgirl: Endgame #1; Detective Comics: Endgame #1; Arkham Manor: Endgame #1	September 2015	HC: 978-1-4012-5877-1 SC: 978-1-4012-6165-8
Batman Vol. 8: Superheavy	Batman (vol. 2) #41–45; Free Comic Book Day 2015 - DC Comics: Divergence #1	March 2016	HC: 978-1-4012-5969-3 SC: 978-1-4012-6630-1
Batman Vol. 9: Bloom	Batman (vol. 2) #46–50	September 2016	HC: 978-1-4012-6462-8 SC: 978-1-4012-6922-7
Batman Vol. 10: Epilogue	Batman (vol. 2) #51–52, Annual (vol. 2) #4; Batman: Futures End #1; Batman: Rebirth #1	December 2016	HC: 978-1-4012-6773-5
Batman: Detective Comics (vol. 2)
Batman: Detective Comics Vol. 1 – Faces of Death	Detective Comics (vol. 2) #1–7	June 2012	HC: 978-1-4012-3466-9
Batman: Detective Comics Vol. 2 – Scare Tactics	Detective Comics (vol. 2) #8–12, 0, Annual (vol. 2) #1	April 2013	978-1-4012-3840-7
Batman: Detective Comics Vol. 3 – Emperor Penguin	Detective Comics (vol. 2) #13–18	November 2013	978-1-4012-4266-4
Batman: Detective Comics Vol. 4 – The Wrath	Detective Comics (vol. 2) #19–24, Annual (vol. 2) #2	July 2014	978-1-4012-4633-4
Batman: Detective Comics Vol. 5 – Gothtopia	Detective Comics (vol. 2) #25–29	November 2014	978-1-4012-4998-4
Batman: Detective Comics Vol. 6 – Icarus	Detective Comics (vol. 2) #30–34, Annual (vol. 2) #3	May 2015	978-1-4012-5442-1
Batman: Detective Comics Vol. 7 – Anarky	Detective Comics (vol. 2) #35–40; Detective Comics: Endgame #1; Detective Comics: Futures End #1	January 2016	978-1-4012-5749-1
Batman: Detective Comics Vol. 8 – Blood of Heroes	Detective Comics (vol. 2) #41–46; Detective Comics Sneak Peek	August 2016	978-1-4012-6355-3
Batman: Detective Comics Vol. 9 – Gordon at War	Detective Comics (vol. 2) #47–52	December 2016	978-1-4012-6923-4
Batman and Robin (vol. 2)
Batman and Robin Vol. 1: Born to Kill	Batman and Robin (vol. 2) #1–8	July 2012	HC: 978-1-4012-3487-4
Batman and Robin Vol. 2: Pearl	Batman and Robin (vol. 2) #9–14, 0	June 2013	HC: 978-1-4012-4089-9
Batman and Robin Vol. 3: Death of the Family	Batman and Robin (vol. 2) #15–17, Annual (vol. 2) #1; Batman (vol. 2) #17	November 2013	978-1-4012-4617-4
Batman and Robin Vol. 4: Requiem for Damian	Batman and Robin (vol. 2) #18–23	June 2014	978-1-4012-5058-4
Batman and Robin Vol. 5: The Big Burn	Batman and Robin (vol. 2) #23.1–28, Annual (vol. 2) #2	December 2014	978-1-4012-5333-2
Batman and Robin Vol. 6: The Hunt for Robin	Batman and Robin (vol. 2) #29-34; Robin Rises: Omega #1	June 2015	HC: 978-1-4012-5334-9
Batman and Robin Vol. 7: Robin Rises	Batman and Robin (vol. 2) #35–40, Annual (vol. 2) #3; Robin Rises: Alpha #1; Batman and Robin: Futures End #1; a story from Secret Origins (vol. 3) #4	November 2015	978-1-4012-5677-7
Batman: The Dark Knight (vol. 2)
Batman: The Dark Knight Vol. 1 – Knight Terrors	Batman: The Dark Knight (vol. 2) #1–9	October 2012	HC: 978-1-4012-3543-7
Batman: The Dark Knight Vol. 2 – Cycle of Violence	Batman: The Dark Knight (vol. 2) #0, 10–15	July 2013	978-1-4012-4282-4
Batman: The Dark Knight Vol. 3 – Mad	Batman: The Dark Knight (vol. 2) #16–21	January 2014	978-1-4012-4619-8
Batman: The Dark Knight Vol. 4 – Clay	Batman: The Dark Knight (vol. 2) #22–29	August 2014	978-1-4012-4930-4
Batman, Incorporated (vol. 2)
Batman, Incorporated Vol. 1: Demon Star	Batman, Incorporated (vol. 2) #0–6	May 2013	978-1-4012-3212-2
Batman, Incorporated Vol. 2: Gotham's Most Wanted	Batman, Incorporated (vol. 2) #7–13; Batman, Incorporated Special #1	October 2013	978-1-4012-4697-6
Arkham Manor
Arkham Manor Vol. 1	Arkham Manor #1–6	July 2015	978-1-4012-5458-2
Batman Eternal
Batman Eternal Vol. 1	Batman Eternal #1–21	December 2014	978-1-4012-5173-4
Batman Eternal Vol. 2	Batman Eternal #22–34	July 2015	978-1-4012-5231-1
Batman Eternal Vol. 3	Batman Eternal #35–52	October 2015	978-1-4012-5752-1
Batman and Robin Eternal
Batman and Robin Eternal Vol. 1	Batman and Robin Eternal #1–13	March 2016	978-1-4012-5967-9
Batman and Robin Eternal Vol. 2	Batman and Robin Eternal #14–26	July 2016	978-1-4012-6248-8
Batman/Superman
Batman/Superman Vol. 1: Cross Worlds	Batman/Superman #1–4; Justice League (vol. 2) #23.1	May 2014	978-1-4012-4934-2
Batman/Superman Vol. 2: Game Over	Batman/Superman #5–9, Annual #1; World's Finest #20–21	November 2014	978-1-4012-5423-0
Batman/Superman Vol. 3: Second Chance	Batman/Superman #10–15	May 2015	978-1-4012-5424-7
Batman/Superman Vol. 4: Siege	Batman/Superman #16–20, Annual #2; Batman/Superman: Futures End #1	December 2015	978-1-4012-5755-2
Batman/Superman Vol. 5: Truth Hurts	Batman/Superman #21–27	August 2016	978-1-4012-6369-0
Batman/Superman Vol. 6: Universe's Finest	Batman/Superman #28–34, Annual #3	March 2017	978-1-4012-6819-0

==== The New 52 Batman new editions ====
This list is for updated versions of the various New 52 titles. The titles presented here may be updated to a more concise trade or expand on previous trades.

Title	Material collected	Publication date	ISBN
DC Essential editions
Batman: The Court of Owls Saga	Batman (vol. 2) #1–11	September 2018	978-1-4012-8433-6
Batman and Robin: Bad Blood	Batman and Robin (vol. 2) #0–14	November 2018	978-1-4012-8933-1
Batman: Death of the Family Saga	Batman (vol. 2) #13–17	February 2019	978-1-4012-9093-1
Batman: Faces of Death	Detective Comics (vol. 2) #1–7	April 2019	978-1-4012-9094-8
DC Omnibus editions
Batman and Robin by Peter J. Tomasi and Patrick Gleason Omnibus	Batman and Robin #20–22; Batman and Robin (vol. 2) #0–40, Annual (vol. 2) #1–3; Robin Rises: Omega #1; Robin Rises: Alpha #1; a story from Secret Origins (vol. 3) #4	November 2017	978-1-4012-7683-6
Batman by Scott Snyder and Greg Capullo Omnibus Volume 1	Batman (2011) #1-33, #23.2, Annual #1-2	November 2019	978-1-4012-9884-5
Batman by Scott Snyder and Greg Capullo Omnibus Volume 2	Batman (2011) #34-52, Annual #3-4; Batman: Futures End #1; DC Sneak Peek: Batman #1, Batman: Last Knight on Earth #1-3, material from Detective Comics #27 and Detective Comics #1000	November 2021	978-1-77951-326-7
Batman Eternal Omnibus	Batman Eternal #1–52; Batman (vol. 2) #28	September 2019	978-1-4012-9417-5
Absolute editions
Absolute Batman Incorporated	Batman Incorporated #1–8; Batman Incorporated: Leviathan Strikes #1; Batman, Incorporated (vol. 2) #0–13; Batman, Incorporated Special #1	January 2015	978-1-4012-5121-5
Absolute Batman: The Court of Owls	Batman (vol. 2) #1–11	November 2015	978-1-4012-5910-5
Absolute Batman: Death Of The Family	Batman (vol. 2) #13-17, Detective Comics (The New 52) #1	October 2024	978-1-77952-830-8
Absolute Batman: Zero Year	Batman (vol. 2) #0, #21-27, #29-33	January 2025	978-1-7995-0023-0
Batman Noir editions
Batman Noir: The Court of Owls	Batman (vol. 2) #1–11	December 2017	978-1-4012-7395-8
Batman Unwrapped editions
Batman Unwrapped: The Court of Owls	Batman (vol. 2) #1–11	September 2014	978-1-4012-4507-8
Batman: The Dark Knight Unwrapped by David Finch	Batman: The Dark Knight #1–3; Batman: The Return #1; Batman: The Dark Knight (vol. 2) #1–7, 9	May 2015	978-1-4012-4884-0
Batman Unwrapped: Death of the Family	Batman (vol. 2) #13–17	December 2017	978-1-4012-7488-7
DC Deluxe Editions
Damian, Son of Batman: The Deluxe Edition	Damian, Son of Batman #1-4; Batman #666	July 2014	978-1-4012-4642-6
Batman by Francis Manapul and Brian Buccellato: The Deluxe Edition	Detective Comics (vol. 2) #30–40, Annual (vol. 2) #1; Detective Comics: Futures End #1; Detective Comics: Endgame #1	November 2018	978-1-4012-8485-5
Box sets
Batman by Scott Snyder and Greg Capullo Box Set Vol. 1	Collects Batman Vol. 1: The Court of Owls, Batman Vol. 2: The City of Owls and Batman Vol. 3: Death of the Family in trade paperback form	September 2016	978-1-4012-6766-7
Batman by Scott Snyder and Greg Capullo Box Set Vol. 2	Collects Batman Vol. 4: Zero Year – Secret City, Batman Vol. 5: Zero Year – Dark City and Batman Vol. 6: Graveyard Shift in trade paperback form	August 2017	978-1-4012-7147-3
Batman by Scott Snyder and Greg Capullo Box Set Vol. 3	Collects Batman Vol. 7: Endgame, Batman Vol. 8: Superheavy, Batman Vol. 9: Bloom and Batman Vol. 10: Epilogue in trade paperback form	September 2018	978-1-4012-8598-2

=== DC Rebirth Batman ===
In 2016, DC Comics once again relaunched its continuity and entire line of ongoing monthly superhero comic books. Using the end of The New 52 initiative in May 2016 as its launching point, DC Rebirth intended to restore the DC Universe to a form much like that prior to the Flashpoint story arc, while still incorporating numerous elements of The New 52, including its continuity. The collected works are listed in order of publication date, not in chronological order. This list includes all DC Rebirth titles centered around Batman. The DC Comics crossover story lines Dark Nights: Metal and Dark Nights: Death Metal are both included here strictly due to their Batman-centric focus.

Title	Material collected	Publication date	ISBN
Batman (vol. 3)
Batman Vol. 1: I Am Gotham	Batman: Rebirth #1; Batman (vol. 3) #1–6	January 2017	978-1-4012-6777-3
Batman: Night of the Monster Men	Batman (vol. 3) #7–8; Nightwing (vol. 4) #5–6; Detective Comics #941–942	February 2017	978-1-4012-7067-4
Batman Vol. 2: I Am Suicide	Batman (vol. 3) #9–15	April 2017	978-1-4012-6854-1
Batman Vol. 3: I Am Bane	Batman (vol. 3) #16–20, 23–24; Annual (vol. 3) #1	August 2017	978-1-4012-7131-2
Batman/The Flash: The Button	Batman (vol. 3) #21–22; The Flash (vol. 5) #21–22	October 2017	978-1-4012-7644-7
Batman Vol. 4: The War of Jokes and Riddles	Batman (vol. 3) #25–32	December 2017	978-1-4012-7361-3
Batman Vol. 5: The Rules of Engagement	Batman (vol. 3) #33–37; Annual (vol. 3) #2	April 2018	978-1-4012-7731-4
Batman Vol. 6: Bride or Burglar?	Batman (vol. 3) #38–44	July 2018	978-1-4012-8338-4
Batman: Preludes to the Wedding	Robin vs. Ra's al Ghul #1; Nightwing vs. Hush #1; Batgirl vs. the Riddler #1; Red Hood vs. Anarky #1; Harley Quinn vs. the Joker #1	September 2018	978-1-4012-8654-5
Batman Vol. 7: The Wedding	Batman (vol. 3) #45–50	October 2018	978-1-4012-8027-7
Batman Vol. 8: Cold Days	Batman (vol. 3) #51–57	December 2018	978-1-4012-8352-0
Batman Vol. 9: The Tyrant Wing	Batman (vol. 3) #58–60, Annual (vol. 3) #3, Batman Secret Files #1	March 2019	978-1-4012-8844-0
Batman Vol. 10: Knightmares	Batman (vol. 3) #61–63, 66–69	September 2019	978-1-77950-158-5
Batman Vol. 11: The Fall and the Fallen	Batman (vol. 3) #70–74, Batman Secret Files #2	December 2019	978-1-77950-160-8
Batman Vol. 12: City of Bane Part 1	Batman (vol. 3) #75–79	April 2020	978-1-4012-9958-3
Batman Vol. 13: City of Bane Part 2	Batman (vol. 3) #80–85, Annual (vol. 3) #4	July 2020	978-1-77950-284-1
Batman Vol. 1: Their Dark Designs	Batman (vol. 3) #86–94	October 2020	978-1-77950-556-9
Batman Vol. 2: The Joker War	Batman (vol. 3) #95–100	February 2021	978-1-77950-790-7
The Joker War Saga	Batman (vol. 3) #95–100; Batgirl (vol. 5) #47; Detective Comics #1025; Red Hood: Outlaw #48; Nightwing (vol. 4) #74; The Joker War Zone #1; material from Harley Quinn (vol. 3) #75 and Catwoman (vol. 5) #25	February 2021	978-1-77951-179-9
Batman Vol. 3: Ghost Stories	Batman (vol. 3) #101–105, Annual (vol. 3) #5; Detective Comics #1027	June 2021	978-1-77951-063-1
Detective Comics
Detective Comics Vol. 1: Rise of the Batmen	Detective Comics #934–940	February 2017	978-1-4012-6799-5
Detective Comics Vol. 2: The Victim Syndicate	Detective Comics #943–949	May 2017	978-1-4012-6891-6
Detective Comics Vol. 3: League of Shadows	Detective Comics #950–956	October 2017	978-1-4012-7609-6
Detective Comics Vol. 4: Deus Ex Machina	Detective Comics #957–962	December 2017	978-1-4012-7497-9
Detective Comics Vol. 5: A Lonely Place of Living	Detective Comics #963–968	April 2018	978-1-4012-7822-9
Detective Comics Vol. 6: Fall of the Batmen	Detective Comics #969–974, Annual (vol. 3) #1	June 2018	978-1-4012-8145-8
Detective Comics Vol. 7: Batmen Eternal	Detective Comics #975–981	September 2018	978-1-4012-8421-3
Detective Comics Vol. 8: On the Outside	Detective Comics #982–987	December 2018	978-1-4012-8528-9
Detective Comics Vol. 9: Deface the Face	Detective Comics #988–993	April 2019	978-1-4012-9064-1
Detective Comics Vol. 1: Mythology	Detective Comics #994–999	February 2020	978-1-77950-172-1
Detective Comics Vol. 2: Arkham Knight	Detective Comics #1001–1005	September 2020	978-1-77950-251-3
Detective Comics Vol. 3: Greetings from Gotham	Detective Comics #1006–1011	September 2020	978-1-77950-554-5
Detective Comics Vol. 4: Cold Vengeance	Detective Comics #1012–1019	December 2020	978-1-77950-455-5
Detective Comics Vol. 5: The Joker War	Detective Comics #1020–1026, Annual (vol. 3) #3; Batman: Pennyworth - R.I.P. #1; a story from Detective Comics #1027	March 2021	978-1-77950-794-5
Detective Comics Vol. 6: The Road to Ruin	Detective Comics #1028–1033	October 2021	978-1-77951-270-3
All-Star Batman
All-Star Batman Vol. 1: My Own Worst Enemy	All-Star Batman #1–5	April 2017	978-1-4012-6978-4
All-Star Batman Vol. 2: Ends of the Earth	All-Star Batman #6–9	September 2017	978-1-4012-7443-6
All-Star Batman Vol. 3: The First Ally	All-Star Batman #10–14	March 2018	978-1-4012-7726-0
Trinity
Trinity Vol. 1: Better Together	Trinity #1–6	June 2017	978-1-4012-7076-6
Trinity Vol. 2: Dead Space	Trinity #7–11	December 2017	978-1-4012-7467-2
Trinity Vol. 3: Dark Destiny	Trinity #12–16	July 2018	978-1-4012-8051-2
Trinity Vol. 4: The Search for Steve Trevor	Trinity #17–22	December 2018	978-1-4012-8550-0
Dark Nights: Metal
Dark Days: The Road to Metal	Dark Days: The Forge #1; Dark Days: The Casting #1; Final Crisis #6–7; Batman: The Return of Bruce Wayne #1; Batman (vol. 2) #38–39; Nightwing (vol. 4) #17	May 2018	978-1-4012-7819-9
Dark Nights: Metal – The Deluxe Edition	Dark Nights: Metal #1–6	June 2018	978-1-4012-7732-1
Dark Nights: Metal – Dark Knights Rising	Batman: The Red Death #1; Batman: The Murder Machine #1; Batman: The Dawnbreaker #1; Batman: The Drowned #1; Batman: The Merciless #1; Batman: The Devastator #1; The Batman Who Laughs #1; Dark Knights Rising: The Wild Hunt #1	June 2018	978-1-4012-7737-6
Dark Nights: Metal – The Resistance	The Flash (vol. 5) #33; Hal Jordan and the Green Lantern Corps #32; Justice League (vol. 4) #32–33; Hawkman: Found #1; Teen Titans (vol. 6) #12; Nightwing (vol. 4) #29; Suicide Squad (vol. 5) #26; Green Arrow (vol. 7) #32; Batman: Lost #1	July 2018	978-1-4012-8298-1
The Batman Who Laughs	The Batman Who Laughs (vol. 2) #1–7; The Batman Who Laughs: The Grim Knight #1	September 2019	978-1-4012-9403-8
Dark Nights: Death Metal
Dark Nights: Death Metal Deluxe Edition	Dark Nights: Death Metal #1–6	April 2021	978-1-77950-794-5
Dark Nights: Death Metal – The Darkest Knight	Dark Nights: Death Metal – Legends of the Dark Knights #1; Dark Nights: Death Metal – Trinity Crisis #1; Dark Nights: Death Metal – Speed Metal #1; Dark Nights: Death Metal – Multiverse's End #1; Dark Nights: Death Metal Guidebook #1	April 2021	978-1-77950-792-1
Dark Nights: Death Metal – The Multiverse Who Laughs	Dark Nights: Death Metal – Robin King #1; Dark Nights: Death Metal – Rise of the New God #1; Dark Nights: Death Metal – Infinite Hour Exxxtreme! #1; Dark Nights: Death Metal: – The Multiverse Who Laughs #1; Dark Nights: Death Metal – The Secret Origin #1	May 2021	978-1-77950-793-8
Dark Nights: Death Metal – War of the Multiverses	Dark Nights: Death Metal – Last Stories of the DC Universe #1; Dark Nights: Death Metal – The Last 52: War of the Multiverses #1	May 2021	978-1-77951-006-8
Justice League: Death Metal	Justice League (vol. 4) #53–57	September 2021	978-1-77951-199-7

==== DC Rebirth Batman new editions ====
This list is for updated versions of the various DC Rebirth titles. The titles presented here may be updated to a more concise trade or expand on previous trades.

Title	Material collected	Publication date	ISBN
DC Deluxe Editions
Batman Rebirth Deluxe Edition Book 1	Batman: Rebirth #1, Batman (vol. 3) #1–15	September 2017	HC: 978-1-4012-7132-9
Batman Rebirth Deluxe Edition Book 2	Batman (vol. 3) #16–32, Annual (vol. 2) #1	June 2018	HC: 978-1-4012-8035-2
Batman Rebirth Deluxe Edition Book 3	Batman (vol. 3) #33–43, Annual (vol. 2) #2	December 2018	HC: 978-1-4012-8521-0
Batman Rebirth Deluxe Edition Book 4	Batman (vol. 3) #44–57, DC Nation #0	July 2019	HC: 978-1-4012-9188-4
Batman Rebirth Deluxe Edition Book 5	Batman (vol. 3) #58–63, #66-69, Annual (vol. 2) #3, Batman Secret Files #1	October 2020	HC: 978-1-77950-314-5
Batman Rebirth Deluxe Edition Book 6	Batman (vol. 3) #70–85, Annual (vol. 2) #4, Batman Secret Files #2	July 2022	HC: 978-1-77951-570-4
Batman/Catwoman: The Wedding Album - The Deluxe Edition	Batman (vol. 3) #24, 44, 50	September 2018	HC: 978-1-4012-8653-8
Batman: Detective Comics Rebirth Deluxe Edition Book 1	Detective Comics #934–949	November 2017	HC: 978-1-4012-7608-9
Batman: Detective Comics Rebirth Deluxe Edition Book 2	Detective Comics #950–964	May 2018	HC: 978-1-4012-7857-1
Batman: Detective Comics Rebirth Deluxe Edition Book 3	Detective Comics #965–974, Annual (vol. 2) #1	October 2018	HC: 978-1-4012-8481-7
Batman: Detective Comics Rebirth Deluxe Edition Book 4	Detective Comics #974–982	April 2019	HC: 978-1-4012-8910-2
Batman: Detective Comics #1000 Deluxe Edition	Detective Comics #1000; a story from Detective Comics: Batman 80th Anniversary Giant #1; an all-new story published here for the first time ever; all of the issue's variant covers	June 2019	HC: 978-1-4012-9419-9
Batman: Detective Comics #1027 Deluxe Edition	Detective Comics #1027; all of the issue's variant covers	November 2020	HC: 978-1-77950-674-0
Detective Comics Omnibus
Batman: Detective Comics by Peter J. Tomasi Omnibus	Detective Comics #994-1016, 1018-1033, Detective Comics Annual #2-#3, Batman: Pennyworth R.I.P.	August 2023	978-1-77952-125-5

=== Infinite Frontier Batman ===
Title	Material collected	Published date	ISBN
Batman
Batman Vol. 4: The Cowardly Lot	Batman (vol. 3) #106-111, Infinite Frontier #1	September 2021	978-1-77951-198-0
Batman Vol. 5: Fear State	Batman (vol. 3) #112-117	March 2022	978-1-77951-430-1
Batman: Fear State Saga	Batman (vol. 3) #112-117, Batman Secret Files: The Gardener #1, Batman Secret Files: Peacekeeper-01 #1, Batman Secret Files: Miracle Molly #1, Batman: Fear State: Alpha #1, Batman: Fear State: Omega #1	April 2022	978-1-77951-524-7
Batman Vol. 6: Abyss	Batman (vol. 3) #118–121, 124	August 2022	978-1-77951-656-5
Batman: Shadow War	Batman #122-123, Robin #13-14, Deathstroke Inc. #8-9, Shadow War: Alpha #1, Shadow War: Omega #1, Shadow War Zone #1	November 2022	978-1-77951-797-5
Batman: The Knight	Batman: The Knight #1-10	May 2024	978-1-77952-507-9
Batman Vol. 1: Failsafe	Batman (vol. 3) #125-130	March 2023	978-1-77951-993-1
Batman Vol. 2: The Bat-Man of Gotham	Batman (vol. 3) #131-136	August 2023	978-1-77952-042-5
Batman/Catwoman: The Gotham War	Batman (vol. 3) #137-138, Batman/Catwoman: The Gotham War: Battle Lines #1, Batman/Catwoman: The Gotham War: Scorched Earth #1, Batman/Catwoman: The Gotham War: The Red Hood #1-2, Catwoman #57-58	June 2024	978-1-77952-598-7
Batman Vol. 3: The Joker Year One	Batman (vol. 3) #139-144	September 2024	978-1-77952-457-7
Batman Vol. 4: Dark Prisons	Batman (vol. 3) #145-152	March 2025	978-1-79950-067-4
Batman Vol. 5: The Dying City	Batman (vol. 3) #153-157, lead story from Batman #150	May 2025	978-1-79950-169-5
Batman Vol. 6: H2SH Volume One	Batman (vol. 3) #158-163	September 2026	978-1-79950-546-4
Batman: Detective Comics
Detective Comics Vol. 1: The Neighborhood	Detective Comics #1034–1039	February 2022	978-1-77951-422-6
Detective Comics Vol. 2: Fear State	Detective Comics #1040–1045; Batman Secret Files: Huntress #1; Detective Comics back-up features	July 2022	978-1-77951-555-1
Detective Comics Vol. 3: Arkham Rising	Detective Comics #1044–1046; Detective Comics 2021 Annual	September 2022	978-1-77951-805-7
Detective Comics: Shadows of the Bat: The Tower	Detective Comics main story from #1047–1058	December 2022	978-1-77951-700-5
Detective Comics: Shadows of the Bat: House of Gotham	Detective Comics backup stories from #1047–1058	December 2022	978-1-77951-701-2
Detective Comics Vol. 4: Riddle Me This	Detective Comics #1059-1061	April 2023	978-1-77952-067-8
Detective Comics: Gotham Nocturne Overture	Detective Comics #1062-1065	August 2023	978-1-77952-094-4
Detective Comics: Gotham Nocturne Act I	Detective Comics #1066-1070	February 2024	978-1-77952-462-1
Detective Comics: Gotham Nocturne Act II	Detective Comics #1071-1075	September 2024	978-1-77952-742-4
Detective Comics: Gotham Nocturne Intermezzo: Outlaw	Detective Comics #1076-1080	December 2024	978-1-77952-856-8
Detective Comics: Gotham Nocturne Act III	Detective Comics #1081-1089	March 2025	978-1-79950-069-8

=== Batman: Legends of the Dark Knight ===
The following are collected works of the comic book series Batman: Legends of the Dark Knight, which primarily concentrates on early tales in Batman's career that are not necessarily considered canon, but have also been used during major crossover story lines (such as Batman: Knightfall and Batman: No Man's Land). The series has not yet been completely collected in book form as of this date.

Title	Material collected	Publication date	ISBN
Batman: Legends of the Dark Knight
Batman: Shaman	Legends of the Dark Knight #1–5	February 1998 January 2016; January 2019	SC: 978-1-56389-083-3 Second SC: 978-1-4012-5805-4; Third SC: 978-1-4012-8573-9
Batman: Gothic	Legends of the Dark Knight #6–10	September 2007 July 2015	SC: 978-1-4012-1549-1 Second SC: 978-1-4012-5516-9
Batman: Prey	Legends of the Dark Knight #11–15 (the two revised editions also contain the sequel story "Terror" from Batman: Legends of the Dark Knight #137–141 (see below))	October 1992 January 2012; June 2012	SC: 978-0-930289-68-3 Second SC: 978-1-78116-357-3; Third SC: 978-1-4012-3515-4
Batman: Venom	Legends of the Dark Knight #16–20	October 1993 April 2012	SC: 978-1-56389-101-4 Second SC: 978-1-4012-3383-9
Batman: Faces	Legends of the Dark Knight #28–30	June 1995 July 2008	SC: 978-1-56389-126-7 Second SC: 978-1-4012-1820-1
Batman: Collected Legends of the Dark Knight	Legends of the Dark Knight #32–34; Batman: Legends of the Dark Knight #38, 42–43	May 1994	SC: 978-1-56389-147-2
Batman: Other Realms	Legends of the Dark Knight #35–36; Batman: Legends of the Dark Knight #76–78	July 1998	SC: 978-1-56389-420-6
Batman: Dark Legends	Batman: Legends of the Dark Knight #39–40, 50, 52–54	June 1996	SC: 978-1-56389-266-0
Batman: Going Sane	Batman: Legends of the Dark Knight #65–68, 100	August 2008	SC: 978-1-4012-1821-8
Batman: Monsters	Batman: Legends of the Dark Knight #71–73, 83–84, 89–90	November 2009	SC: 978-1-4012-2494-3
Batman: Terror	Batman: Legends of the Dark Knight #137–141 (this story is also included in the two revised editions of Batman: Prey (see above))	November 2003 January 2012; June 2012	SC: 978-1-4012-0125-8 Second SC: 978-1-78116-357-3; Third SC: 978-1-4012-3515-4
Batman: Blink	Batman: Legends of the Dark Knight #156–158, 164–167; There is a series of two stories in this volume: "Blink" (#156–158) and its sequel, "Don't Blink" (#164–167).	February 2015	SC: 978-1-4012-5126-0
Batman: Snow	Batman: Legends of the Dark Knight #192–196	March 2007	SC: 978-1-4012-1265-0
Batman: Legends of the Dark Knight (vol. 2)
Batman: Legends of the Dark Knight Vol. 1	Legends of the Dark Knight (vol. 2) #1–5	September 2013	978-1-4012-4239-8
Batman: Legends of the Dark Knight Vol. 2	Legends of the Dark Knight (vol. 2) #6–10	May 2014	978-1-4012-4600-6
Batman: Legends of the Dark Knight Vol. 3	Legends of the Dark Knight (vol. 2) #11–13; Legends of the Dark Knight 100-Page Super Spectacular #1	December 2014	978-1-4012-4815-4
Batman: Legends of the Dark Knight Vol. 4	Legends of the Dark Knight 100-Page Super Spectacular #2–3	June 2014	978-1-4012-5467-4
Batman: Legends of the Dark Knight Vol. 5	Legends of the Dark Knight 100-Page Super Spectacular #4–5	November 2015	978-1-4012-5814-6

=== Batman Confidential ===
This series has been collected in the following trade paperbacks.

Title	Material collected	Publication date	ISBN
Batman: Rules of Engagement	Batman Confidential #1–6	November 2007; December 2008	HC: 978-1-4012-1481-4; SC: 978-1-4012-1706-8
Batman: Lovers and Madmen	Batman Confidential #7–12	April 2008; April 2009	HC: 978-1-4012-1683-2; SC: 978-1-4012-1742-6
Batman: The Wrath	Batman Confidential #13–16; Batman Special #1	December 2009	SC: 978-1-4012-2514-8
Batman: The Cat and the Bat	Batman Confidential #17–21	December 2009	SC: 978-1-4012-2496-7
Batman: Dead to Rights	Batman Confidential #22–25, 29–30; There is a series of two stories in this volume: "Do You Understand These Rights?" (#22–25) and its sequel, "Bad Cop" (#29–30).	December 2010	SC: 978-1-4012-2925-2
Batman: King Tut's Tomb	Batman Confidential #26–28; The Brave and the Bold #164, 171; Batman #353	March 2010	SC: 978-1-4012-2577-3
Batman: The Bat and the Beast	Batman Confidential #31–35	August 2010	SC: 978-1-4012-2794-4
Batman: Ghosts	Batman Confidential #40–43; Batman/Lobo: Deadly Serious #1–2	May 2018	SC: 978-1-4012-7863-2
Batman vs. the Undead	Batman Confidential #44–48; The sequel to Superman & Batman vs. Vampires & Werewolves #1–6 (see Miniseries above).	February 2011	SC: 978-1-4012-3035-7
Batman: Super Powers	Batman Confidential #50–54	March 2018	SC: 978-1-4012-7772-7

=== Superman/Batman ===
This series has been collected in the following trade paperbacks.

Title	Material collected	Publication date	ISBN
First editions
Superman/Batman Vol. 1: Public Enemies	Superman/Batman #1–6	October 2009	HC: 978-1-4012-0323-8; SC: 978-1-4012-0220-0
Superman/Batman Vol. 2: Supergirl	Superman/Batman #8–13	March 2005	HC: 978-1-4012-0347-4; SC: 978-1-4012-0250-7
Superman/Batman Vol. 3: Absolute Power	Superman/Batman #14–18	July 2005	HC: 978-1-4012-0447-1; SC: 978-1-4012-0714-4
Superman/Batman Vol. 4: Vengeance	Superman/Batman #20–25	December 2008	HC: 978-1-4012-0921-6; SC: 978-1-4012-1043-4
Superman/Batman Vol. 5: Enemies Among Us	Superman/Batman #28–33	March 2009	HC: 978-1-4012-1330-5; SC: 978-1-4012-1243-8
Superman/Batman Vol. 6: Torment	Superman/Batman #37–42	May 2009	HC: 978-1-4012-1700-6; SC: 978-1-4012-1740-2
Superman/Batman Vol. 7: The Search for Kryptonite	Superman/Batman #44–49	November 2009	HC: 978-1-4012-1933-8; SC: 978-1-4012-2012-9
Superman/Batman Vol. 8: Finest Worlds	Superman/Batman #50–56	July 2009	HC: 978-1-84856-377-3; SC: 978-1-4012-2332-8
Superman/Batman Vol. 9: Night and Day	Superman/Batman #60–63, 65–67	August 2010	HC: 978-1-4012-2792-0; SC: 978-1-4012-2808-8
Superman/Batman Vol. 10: Big Noise	Superman/Batman #64, 68–71	December 2010	SC: 978-1-4012-2914-6
Superman/Batman Vol. 11: Worship	Superman/Batman #72–75; Annual #4	April 2011	SC: 978-1-4012-3032-6
Superman/Batman Vol. 12: Sorcerer Kings	Superman/Batman #78–84	October 2011	HC: 978-1-4012-3266-5; SC: 978-1-4012-3446-1
New editions
Superman/Batman Vol. 1	Superman/Batman #1–13	May 2014	978-1-4012-4818-5
Superman/Batman Vol. 2	Superman/Batman #14–26	December 2014	978-1-4012-5079-9
Superman/Batman Vol. 3	Superman/Batman #27–36, Annual #1	April 2016	978-1-4012-6480-2
Superman/Batman Vol. 4	Superman/Batman #37–49, Annual #2	September 2016	978-1-4012-6385-0
Superman/Batman Vol. 5	Superman/Batman #50–63, Annual #3	February 2017	978-1-4012-6528-1
Superman/Batman Vol. 6	Superman/Batman #64–75, Annual #4	December 2017	978-1-4012-7503-7
Superman/Batman Vol. 7	Superman/Batman #76–87, Annual #5	February 2019	978-1-4012-8801-3

=== Batman: Shadow of the Bat ===
This series has been collected in the following trade paperbacks.

Title	Material collected	Publication date	ISBN
Batman: The Last Arkham	Batman: Shadow of the Bat #1–4	October 1993	SC: 978-1-56389-190-8
Batman: Shadow of the Bat Vol. 1	Batman: Shadow of the Bat #1–12	June 2016	SC: 978-1-4012-6319-5
Batman: Shadow of the Bat Vol. 2	Batman: Shadow of the Bat #13–24, Annual #1	May 2017	SC: 978-1-4012-6319-5
Batman: Shadow of the Bat Vol. 3	Batman: Shadow of the Bat #0, 25–31, Annual #2	January 2018	SC: 978-1-4012-7520-4
Batman: Shadow of the Bat Vol. 4	Batman: Shadow of the Bat #32–43	March 2019	SC: 978-1-4012-8805-1

=== Batman: Gotham Knights ===
This series has been collected in the following trade paperbacks.

Title	Material collected	Publication date	ISBN
Batman: Gotham Knights - Transference	Batman: Gotham Knights #1–12	January 2020	SC: 978-1-4012-9407-6
Batman: Gotham Knights - Contested	Batman: Gotham Knights #14–24, 29	February 2021	SC: 978-1-77950-306-0

=== Batman: Arkham and Gotham City Impostors tie-in story collections ===
Title	Material collected	Publication date	ISBN
Batman: Arkham City tie-in stories
Batman: Arkham City	Batman: Arkham City #1–5	October 2011	978-1-4012-3255-9
Batman: Arkham Unhinged Vol. 1	Batman: Arkham Unhinged #1–5	February 2013	HC: 978-1-4012-3749-3; SC: 978-1-4012-4018-9
Batman: Arkham Unhinged Vol. 2	Batman: Arkham Unhinged #6–10	August 2013	978-1-4012-4019-6
Batman: Arkham Unhinged Vol. 3	Batman: Arkham Unhinged #11–15; Batman: Arkham Unhinged - End Game #1	January 2014	978-1-4012-4305-0
Batman: Arkham Unhinged Vol. 4	Batman: Arkham Unhinged #16–20	August 2014	978-1-4012-4681-5
Batman: Arkham Origins tie-in stories
Batman: Arkham Origins	Batman: Arkham Origins #1–14	July 2015	978-1-4012-5465-0
Batman: Arkham Knight tie-in stories
Batman: Arkham Knight Vol. 1	Batman: Arkham Knight #1–4	July 2015	978-1-4012-5804-7
Batman: Arkham Knight Vol. 2	Batman: Arkham Knight #5–9	March 2016	978-1-4012-6505-2
Batman: Arkham Knight Vol. 3	Batman: Arkham Knight #10–12, Annual #1; Batman: Arkham Knight - Robin #1; Batman: Arkham Knight - Batgirl & Harley Quinn #1	November 2016	978-1-4012-6067-5
Batman: Arkham Knight Genesis	Batman: Arkham Knight Genesis #1–6	March 2016	978-1-4012-6066-8
Gotham City Impostors tie-in stories
Batman: Impostors	Detective Comics #867–870; This story is the prequel to the DC Comics online video game Gotham City Impostors.	August 2011	SC: 978-1-4012-3091-3
New editions
Batman: The Arkham Saga Omnibus	Batman: Arkham Origins #1–14; Batman: Arkham Asylum - The Road to Arkham #1; Batman: Arkham City #1–5; Batman: Arkham City Digital Chapter #1–7; Batman: Arkham Unhinged #1–20; Batman: Arkham Unhinged - End Game #1; Batman: Arkham Knight #1–12, Annual #1; Batman: Arkham Knight - Robin #1; Batman: Arkham Knight - Batgirl Begins #1; Batman: Arkham Knight - Batgirl & Harley Quinn #1; Batman: Arkham Knight Genesis #1–6	September 2018	978-1-4012-8432-9

=== Batman '66 collections ===
Title	Material collected	Publication date	ISBN
Main series
Batman '66 Vol. 1	Batman '66 #1–5	April 8, 2014	978-1-4012-4721-8
Batman '66 Vol. 2	Batman '66 #6–10	April 28, 2014	978-1-4012-5461-2
Batman '66 Vol. 3	Batman '66 #11–16	December 8, 2015	978-1-4012-5750-7
Batman '66 Vol. 4	Batman '66 #17–22; Batman '66: The Lost Episode #1	May 17, 2016	978-1-4012-6104-7
Batman '66 Vol. 5	Batman '66 #23–30	December 13, 2016	978-1-4012-6483-3
Batman '66 crossover miniseries
Batman '66 Meets the Green Hornet	Batman '66 Meets the Green Hornet #1–6	March 24, 2015	978-1-4012-5228-1
Batman '66 Meets the Man from U.N.C.L.E.	Batman '66 Meets the Man from U.N.C.L.E. #1–6	September 13, 2016	978-1-4012-6447-5
Batman '66 Meets Steed and Mrs. Peel	Batman '66 Meets Steed and Mrs. Peel #1–6	September 27, 2017	978-1-4012-6820-6
Batman '66 Meets Wonder Woman '77	Batman '66 Meets Wonder Woman '77 #1–6	October 3, 2017	978-1-4012-7385-9
Archie Meets Batman '66	Archie Meets Batman '66 #1–6	April 18, 2019	978-1-68255-847-8
New editions
Batman '66 Omnibus	Batman '66 #1–30; Batman '66: The Lost Episode #1; a story from Solo #7	August 14, 2018	978-1-4012-8328-5

=== Intercompany crossover story collections ===
This list includes crossover comic book stories between Batman and other characters from different companies.

Title	Material collected	Publication date	ISBN
Intercompany crossovers
Batman versus Predator: The Collected Edition	Batman versus Predator #1–3	April 1993	978-1-56389-092-5
Batman versus Predator II: Bloodmatch	Batman versus Predator II: Bloodmatch #1–4	October 1995	978-1-56389-221-9
Batman/Aliens	Batman/Aliens #1–2	December 1997	978-1-56971-305-1
Batman versus Predator III: Blood Ties	Batman versus Predator III: Blood Ties #1–4	June 1998	978-1-56389-418-3
Batman/Aliens II	Batman/Aliens II #1–3	September 2003	978-1-4012-0081-7
Superman and Batman versus Aliens and Predator	Superman and Batman versus Aliens and Predator #1–2	May 2007	978-1-4012-1328-2
DC versus Marvel Comics	DC versus Marvel Comics #1, Marvel Comics versus DC #2, Marvel Comics versus DC #3, DC versus Marvel Comics #4; Doctor Strangefate #1	September 1996	978-1-56389-294-3
The Amalgam Age of Comics: The DC Comics Collection	Amazon #1; Assassins #1; Doctor Strangefate #1; JLX #1; Legends of the Dark Claw #1; Super-Soldier #1	October 1996	978-1-56389-295-0
The Amalgam Age of Comics: The Marvel Comics Collection	Bruce Wayne, Agent of S.H.I.E.L.D. #1; Bullets and Bracelets #1; Magneto and the Magnetic Men #1; Speed Demon #1; Spider-Boy #1; X-Patrol #1	October 1996	978-0-7851-0240-3
Return to the Amalgam Age of Comics: The DC Comics Collection	Bat-Thing #1; Dark Claw Adventures #1; Generation Hex #1; JLX Unleashed #1; Lobo the Duck #1; Super-Soldier, Man of War #1	December 1997	978-1-56389-382-7
Return to the Amalgam Age of Comics: The Marvel Comics Collection	Challengers of the Fantastic #1; Iron Lantern #1; Spider-Boy Team-Up #1; The Exciting X-Patrol #1; The Magnetic Men featuring Magneto #1; Thorion of the New Asgods #1	December 1997	978-0-7851-0580-0
Crossover Classics: The Marvel/DC Collection Vol. 1	Superman vs. the Amazing Spider-Man; Superman and the Amazing Spider-Man; Batman vs. the Incredible Hulk; The Uncanny X-Men and the New Teen Titans	June 1997	978-0-87135-858-5
DC/Marvel Crossover Classics Vol. 2	Batman/Punisher: Lake of Fire; Punisher/Batman: Deadly Knights; Batman/Captain America; Silver Surfer/Superman #1	January 1998	978-1-56389-399-5
Crossover Classics: The Marvel/DC Collection Vol. 3	Incredible Hulk vs. Superman; Daredevil/Batman: Eye for an Eye; Spider-Man and Batman: Disordered Minds; Spider-Man and Gen 13; Gen X/Gen 13; Team X/Team 7	May 2002	978-0-7851-0818-4
DC/Marvel Crossover Classics Vol. 4	Green Lantern/Silver Surfer: Unholy Alliances; Darkseid vs. Galactus: The Hunger; Batman & Spider-Man: New Age Dawning; Superman/Fantastic Four	October 2003	978-1-4012-0169-2
Batman/Tarzan: Claws of the Cat-woman	Batman/Tarzan: Claws of the Cat-woman #1–4	August 2000	978-1-56971-466-9
Ghost/Batgirl: The Resurrection Machine	Ghost/Batgirl #1–4	August 2000	978-1-56971-570-3
Joker/Mask	Joker/Mask #1–4	May 2001	978-1-56971-518-5
Batman/Deathblow: After the Fire	Batman/Deathblow: After the Fire #1–3	April 2003	978-1-4012-0034-3
Batman/Grendel	Batman/Grendel: Devil's Riddle and Grendel/Batman: Devil's Masque; Batman/Grendel: Devil's Bones and Grendel/Batman: Devil's Dance	April 2008	978-1-59307-823-2
Hellboy: Masks and Monsters	Batman/Hellboy/Starman #1–2; Hellboy/Ghost #1–2	October 2010	978-1-59582-567-4
The Batman/Judge Dredd Files	Batman/Judge Dredd: Judgment on Gotham; Batman/Judge Dredd: The Ultimate Riddle; Batman/Judge Dredd: Die Laughing #1–2	November 2004	978-1-4012-0420-4
The Batman/Judge Dredd Collection	Batman/Judge Dredd: Judgment on Gotham; Batman/Judge Dredd: Vendetta in Gotham; Batman/Judge Dredd: The Ultimate Riddle; Batman/Judge Dredd: Die Laughing #1–2; Lobo/Judge Dredd: Psycho-Bikers vs. the Mutants From Hell!	January 2014	978-1-4012-3678-6
DC Comics/Dark Horse Comics: Aliens	Batman/Aliens #1–2; Batman/Aliens II #1–3; Superman and Batman versus Aliens and Predator #1–2; WildC.A.T.S./Aliens #1	May 2016	978-1-4012-6636-3
DC Comics/Dark Horse Comics: Batman versus Predator	Batman versus Predator #1–3; Batman versus Predator II: Bloodmatch #1–4; Batman versus Predator III: Blood Ties #1–4	June 2017	978-1-4012-7078-0
Batman/Teenage Mutant Ninja Turtles	Batman/Teenage Mutant Ninja Turtles #1–6	August 2016	978-1-4012-6278-5
Batman/Wildcat	Batman/Wildcat #1–3; The Brave and the Bold #88, 97, 110, 118, 122	March 2017	978-1-4012-6727-8
Batman/Teenage Mutant Ninja Turtles Adventures	Batman/Teenage Mutant Ninja Turtles Adventures #1–6	July 2017	978-1-63140-909-7
Batman/The Shadow: The Murder Geniuses	Batman/The Shadow #1–6	November 2017	978-1-4012-7527-3
The Shadow/Batman	The Shadow/Batman #1–6	May 2018	978-1-5241-0627-0
Batman/Teenage Mutant Ninja Turtles II	Batman/Teenage Mutant Ninja Turtles II #1–6	August 2018	978-1-4012-8031-4
Harley and Ivy Meet Betty and Veronica	Harley and Ivy Meet Betty and Veronica #1–6	September 2018	978-1-4012-8033-8
Batman/Teenage Mutant Ninja Turtles III	Batman/Teenage Mutant Ninja Turtles III #1–6	April 2020	978-1-77950-063-2
Batman/The Maxx: Arkham Dreams	Batman/The Maxx: Arkham Dreams #1–5	February 2021	978-1-68405-432-9
Batman/Spawn: The Classic Collection	Batman/Spawn: War Devil; Spawn/Batman	November 2022	978-1-77952-150-7
Batman/Spawn: The Deluxe Edition	Batman/Spawn: War Devil; Spawn/Batman; Batman/Spawn; a gallery of behind-the-scenes art	April 2023	978-1-77952-281-8

=== Miscellaneous collections ===
These volumes are collections of stories from various Batman continuities, with loose connections of superhero, supervillain, location or subject.

Title	Material collected	Publication date	ISBN
Collected miniseries editions
Batman: Cacophony	Batman: Cacophony #1–3	September 2009; September 2010	HC: 978-1-4012-2418-9; SC: 978-1-4012-2419-6
Batman: The Widening Gyre	Batman: The Widening Gyre #1–6	December 2010; October 2011	HC: 978-1-4012-2875-0; SC: 978-1-4012-2876-7
Batman: Dark Detective	Batman: Dark Detective #1–6	April 2006	SC: 978-1-4012-0898-1
Batman: Secrets	Batman: Secrets #1–5	January 2007	SC: 978-1-4012-1212-4
Batman: Joker's Asylum	Joker's Asylum: The Joker #1, Joker's Asylum: Penguin #1, Joker's Asylum: Poison Ivy #1, Joker's Asylum: Scarecrow #1 and Joker's Asylum: Two-Face #1	December 2008	SC: 978-1-4012-1955-0
Batman: Gotham After Midnight	Batman: Gotham After Midnight #1–12	September 2009	SC: 978-1-4012-2238-3
Batman: Unseen	Batman: Unseen #1–5	October 2010	SC: 978-1-4012-2926-9
Batman: Joker's Asylum Vol. 2	Joker's Asylum II: Mad Hatter #1, Joker's Asylum II: Harley Quinn #1, Joker's Asylum II: The Riddler #1, Joker's Asylum II: Killer Croc #1 and Joker's Asylum II: Clayface #1	January 2011	SC: 978-1-4012-2980-1
Huntress: Crossbow at the Crossroads	Huntress (vol. 3) #1–6	October 2012	978-1-4012-3733-2
Batman: Gordon of Gotham	Batman: Gordon of Gotham #1–4; Batman: G.C.P.D. #1–4; Batman: Gordon's Law #1–4	September 2014	978-1-4012-5174-1
Bat-Mite	Bat-Mite #1–6 and DC Sneak Peek: Bat-Mite #1	February 2016	SC: 978-1-4012-6100-9
Harley Quinn and Power Girl	Harley Quinn and Power Girl #1–6	March 2016	978-1-4012-5974-7
Batman: Europa	Batman: Europa #1–4	April 2016	978-1-4012-5970-9
Poison Ivy: Cycle of Life and Death	Poison Ivy: Cycle of Life and Death #1–6	September 2016	978-1-4012-6451-2
Harley Quinn and Her Gang of Harleys	Harley Quinn and Her Gang of Harleys #1–6	February 2017	SC: 978-1-4012-6785-8
Harley's Little Black Book	Harley's Little Black Book #1–6	August 2017; November 2018	HC: 978-1-4012-6976-0; SC: 978-1-4012-7360-6
Old Lady Harley	Old Lady Harley #1–5; Harley Quinn (vol. 3) #42	July 2019	SC: 978-1-4012-9216-4
Batman: Damned	Batman: Damned #1–3	September 2019	HC: 978-1-4012-9140-2
Harleen	Harleen #1–3	February 2020	HC: 978-1-77950-111-0
Batman: White Knight	Batman: White Knight #1–8	March 2020	HC: 978-1-77950-064-9
Batman: Last Knight on Earth	Batman: Last Knight on Earth #1–3	April 2020	HC: 978-1-4012-9496-0
Batman: Curse of the White Knight	Batman: Curse of the White Knight #1–8 and Batman: White Knight Presents Von Freeze #1	September 2020	HC: 978-1-77950-448-7
Joker: Killer Smile	Joker: Killer Smile #1–3 and Batman: The Smile Killer #1	September 2020	HC: 978-1-77950-269-8
Batman: Three Jokers	Batman: Three Jokers #1–3	November 2020	HC: 978-1-77950-023-6
Harley Quinn & the Birds of Prey: The Hunt for Harley	Harley Quinn & the Birds of Prey #1–4 and a story from Harley Quinn Black + White + Red #12	March 2021	SC: 978-1-77950-449-4
Harley Quinn Black + White + Red	Harley Quinn Black + White + Red #1–17 (originally published as digital-first comics), plus two new stories published here for the first time ever	June 2021	SC: 978-1-77950-995-6
Batman: White Knight Presents Harley Quinn	Batman: White Knight Presents Harley Quinn #1–6 and a story from Harley Quinn Black + White + Red #4	June 2021	HC: 978-1-77951-014-3
Joker/Harley: Criminal Sanity	Joker/Harley: Criminal Sanity #1–8 and Joker/Harley: Criminal Sanity Secret Files	September 2021	HC: 978-1-77951-202-4
Batman: Joker's Asylum	Joker's Asylum: The Joker #1; Joker's Asylum: Penguin #1; Joker's Asylum: Poison Ivy #1; Joker's Asylum: Scarecrow #1; Joker's Asylum: Two-Face #1; Joker's Asylum: The Riddler #1; Joker's Asylum: Harley Quinn #1; Joker's Asylum: Mad Hatter #1; Joker's Asylum: Killer Croc #1; Joker's Asylum: Clayface #1	October 2022	SC: 978-1-77951-637-4
Batman/Catwoman	Batman/Catwoman #1–12 and Batman/Catwoman Special #1	December 2022	HC: 978-1-77951-707-4
Batman: Beyond the White Knight	Batman: Beyond the White Knight #1–8 and Batman: White Knight Presents: Red Hood #1–2	June 2023	HC: 978-1-77951-852-1
Other editions
Huntress: Darknight Daughter; The Huntress: Origins	DC Super Stars #17; Batman Family #18–20 and the Huntress back-up stories from Wonder Woman #271–287, 289–290, 294–295	December 2006; January 2020	First SC: 978-1-4012-0913-1; Second SC: 978-1-77950-072-4
The Strange Deaths of Batman	Detective Comics #347; Batman #291–294; World's Finest Comics #184, 269; Nightwing (vol. 2) #52; a story from The Batman Chronicles #8	January 2009	SC: 978-1-4012-2174-4
Batman International	Batman: Scottish Connection; Batman in Barcelona: Dragon's Knight; Batman: Legends of the Dark Knight #52–53	March 2010	SC: 978-1-4012-2649-7
Batman: Red Water, Crimson Death	The Brave and the Bold #84–86, 93	August 1990	SC: 978-1-85286-271-8
The Joker: The Clown Prince of Crime	The Joker #1–9	December 2013	SC: 978-1-4012-4258-9
Batman: Strange Apparitions	Detective Comics #469–476, 478–479	December 1999	SC: 978-1-56389-500-5
Batman: The Demon Awakes	Batman #232, 243–245, 255	October 1989	SC: 978-1-85286-143-8
Batman: The Frightened City	The Brave and the Bold #79, 81–83	May 1990	SC: 978-1-85286-269-5
Batman: The Joker's Revenge	Batman #219, 234, 251; World's Finest Comics #175–176	January 1990	SC: 978-1-85286-253-4
Batman: The Ring, the Arrow and the Bat	Legends of the DC Universe #7–9; Batman: Legends of the Dark Knight #127–131	December 2003	SC: 978-1-4012-0126-5
Batman: Under the Cowl	Stories from Batman: Legends of the Dark Knight #168; Batman #512, 666; Batman Beyond #1; Detective Comics #665; Teen Titans (vol. 3) #18	February 2010	SC: 978-1-4012-2656-5
Batman: Vow from the Grave	Batman #237; Detective Comics #404, 408, 410, 439	August 1989	SC: 978-1-85286-142-1
Batman: Ego and Other Tails	Batman: Ego; Catwoman: Selina's Big Score; stories from Solo #1, 5; short stories from Batman: Gotham Knights #23, 33	November 2008	SC: 978-1-4012-1359-6
Batman Black and White Vol. 1	Batman Black and White #1–4	July 1999	HC: 978-1-56389-332-2
Batman Black and White Vol. 2	Back-up short stories from Batman: Gotham Knights #1–16, plus five new short stories published here for the first time ever	September 2003	HC: 978-1-56389-828-0
Batman Black and White Vol. 3	Back-up short stories from Batman: Gotham Knights #17–49	May 2007	HC: 978-1-4012-1531-6
Batman Black and White Vol. 4	Batman Black and White (vol. 2) #1–6	July 2014	HC: 978-1-4012-4643-3
Batman Black and White Vol. 5	Batman Black and White (vol. 3) #1–6	September 2021	HC: 978-1-77951-196-6
Catwoman: The Movie & Other Cat Tales	Catwoman: The Movie #1; Catwoman (vol. 2) #0; Catwoman (vol. 3) #11, 25; Published in conjunction with the film Catwoman.	July 2004	SC: 978-1-4012-0336-8
Batman Begins: The Movie and Other Tales of the Dark Knight	Batman Begins: The Official Movie Adaptation; Detective Comics #757; Batman #604; Batman: Legends of the Dark Knight #168; a story from the DC Comics trade paperback Secret Origins of the World's Greatest Super-Heroes; Published in conjunction with the film Batman Begins.	June 2005	SC: 978-1-4352-4343-9
Batman: The Silver Age Comics Vol. 1 – 1966-1967		April 2014	978-1-61377-845-6
Batman: The Silver Age Comics Vol. 2 – 1968-1969		February 2015	978-1-63140-121-3
Batman: The Jiro Kuwata Batmanga Vol. 1		December 2014	978-1-4012-5277-9
Batman: The Jiro Kuwata Batmanga Vol. 2		July 2015	978-1-4012-5552-7
Batman: The Jiro Kuwata Batmanga Vol. 3		February 2016	978-1-4012-5756-9
Batman: Li'l Gotham Vol. 1	Detective Comics Annual #11, Batman Annual #27, Batman: Li'l Gotham #1–6	February 2014	978-1-4012-4494-1
Batman: Li'l Gotham Vol. 2	Batman: Li'l Gotham #7–12	August 2014	978-1-4012-4723-2

=== Writer/artist collections ===
Title	Material collected	Publication date	ISBN
Tales of the Batman
Tales of the Batman: Tim Sale	Legends of the Dark Knight #32–34; Batman: Shadow of the Bat #7–9; a story from Solo #1; a short story from Batman Black and White Vol. 2; stories from Showcase '94 #3–4	December 2007	978-1-4012-1460-9
Tales of the Batman: Gene Colan Vol. 1	Batman #340, 343–345, 348–351; Detective Comics #510, 512, 517, 523, 528–529	August 2011	978-1-4012-3101-9
Tales of the Batman: Don Newton	Batman #305–306, 328; Detective Comics #480, 483–497; The Brave and the Bold #153, 156, 165	December 2011	978-1-4012-3294-8
Tales of the Batman: Archie Goodwin	Detective Comics #437–443, Annual #3; Showcase ‘95 #11; Batman: Legends of the Dark Knight #132–136; Batman: Knight Cries; short stories from Batman Black and White #1, 4	July 2013	978-1-4012-3829-2
Tales of the Batman: Carmine Infantino	Detective Comics #327, 329, 331, 333, 335, 337, 339, 341, 343, 345, 347, 349, 351, 353, 357, 359, 361, 363, 366, 367, 369, 500; The Brave and the Bold #172, 183, 190, 194; DC Comics Presents: Batman #1	June 2014	978-1-4012-4755-3
Tales of the Batman: J. H. Williams III	Batman #526, 550, 667–669, Annual #21; Batman: Legends of the Dark Knight #86–88, 192–196; Chase #7–8; Detective Comics #821	July 2014	978-1-4012-4762-1
Tales of the Batman: Len Wein	Batman #307–310, 312–319, 321–324, 326–327; Detective Comics #408, 444–448, 466, 478–479, 500, 514; World's Finest Comics #207; The Untold Legend of the Batman #1-3; DC Retroactive: Batman - The 70s; a short story from Batman Black and White (vol. 2) #5	December 2014	978-1-4012-5154-3
Tales of the Batman: Alan Brennert	The Brave and the Bold #178, 181–182, 197; Detective Comics #500; Batman: Holy Terror; plus extras	July 2016	978-1-4012-6349-2
Tales of the Batman: Gerry Conway Vol. 1	Detective Comics #463–464, 497–499, 501–504; Batman #295, 305–305; World's Finest Comics #250, 269; The Brave and the Bold #158, 161, 171–174; Man-Bat #1; Batman Family #17	July 2017	978-1-4012-7255-5
Tales of the Batman: Gene Colan Vol. 2	Batman #373; Detective Comics #530–538, 540–544; World's Finest Comics #297, 299	March 2018	978-1-4012-7769-7
Tales of the Batman: Gerry Conway Vol. 2	Detective Comics #505–513; Batman #337–346, 348; World's Finest Comics #270	August 2018	978-1-4012-8163-2
Tales of the Batman: Gerry Conway Vol. 3	Detective Comics #515–526; Batman #349–359	September 2019	978-1-4012-9273-7
Tales of the Batman: Steve Englehart	Detective Comics #439, 469–476; Batman #311; Batman: Legends of the Dark Knight #109-111; Batman: Dark Detective #1–6; Legends of the DC Universe #26-27; a short story from The Batman Chronicles #19	March 2020	978-1-4012-9554-7
Tales of the Batman: Marv Wolfman Vol. 1	Detective Comics #408; Batman #328–335, 436–439; World's Finest Comics #288; The Brave and the Bold #167; Batman and the Outsiders #5; The New Teen Titans #37	March 2020	978-1-4012-9961-3
Legends of the Dark Knight
Legends of the Dark Knight: Marshall Rogers	Detective Comics #468, 471–476, 478–479, 481; Batman: Dark Detective #1–6; DC Special Series #15; Batman: Legends of the Dark Knight #132–136; a story from Secret Origins (vol. 2) #6	October 2011	HC: 978-1-4012-3227-6
Legends of the Dark Knight: Jim Aparo Vol. 1	The Brave and the Bold #98, 100–102, 104–122	April 2012	HC: 978-1-4012-3375-4
Legends of the Dark Knight: Alan Davis	Detective Comics #569–575; Batman: Full Circle; a short story from Batman: Gotham Knights #25	February 2013	978-1-4012-3681-6
Legends of the Dark Knight: Jim Aparo Vol. 2	The Brave and the Bold #123–136, 138–151	October 2013	HC: 978-1-4012-4296-1
Legends of the Dark Knight: Norm Breyfogle Vol. 1	Detective Comics #579, 582–594, 601–607; stories from Batman Annual #11–12	July 2015	978-1-4012-5898-6
Legends of the Dark Knight: Jim Aparo Vol. 3	Detective Comics #444–446; Batman Family #17; The Brave and the Bold #152, 154–155, 157–162, 168–170, 173–178, 180–182; The Untold Legend of the Batman #1–3	September 2017	978-1-4012-7161-9
Legends of the Dark Knight: Norm Breyfogle Vol. 2	Detective Comics #608–621; Batman #455–459	November 2018	978-1-4012-8512-8
Legends of the Dark Knight: Michael Golden	Detective Comics #482; Batman #295, 303; Batman Special #1; DC Special Series #15; covers from Detective Comics #625–626, 628–631, 633, 644–646; Batman #484–485; Nightwing #66–67, 129–130; a story from Showcase '93 #4; a short story from Batman: Gotham Knights #22; a page from Who's Who in the DC Universe #12	June 2019	978-1-4012-8961-4
Legends of the Dark Knight: Matt Wagner	Legends of the Dark Knight #28–30; Batman: Riddler – The Riddle Factory; Dark Moon Rising: Batman and the Monster Men #1–6; Dark Moon Rising: Batman and the Mad Monk #1–6; Batman (vol. 3) #54; covers from Detective Comics #647–649 and Batman #626–641; plus extras	June 2020	978-1-77950-259-9
Legends of the Dark Knight: Jose Luis Garcia-Lopez	Batman #272, 311, 313-314, 318, 321, 336-337, 353; Batman '66: The Lost Episode #1; Batman Confidential #26-28; Family #3; Dark Knight of the Round Table #1-2; Gotham Knights #10; Reign of Terror #1; DC Comics Presents #31, 41; DC Special Series #21; Detective Comics #454, 458-459, 483, 487; The Best of the Brave and the Bold #1-6; The Brave and the Bold #164, 171; The Joker #4; The Untold Legend of the Batman #1-3; **World's Finest Comics #244, 255, 258	April 2023	978-1-77952-169-9
Neal Adams collections
Batman Illustrated by Neal Adams Vol. 1	World's Finest Comics #175–176; The Brave and the Bold #79, 80, 81, 82, 83, 84, 85; plus various covers	October 2003	HC: 978-1-4012-0041-1
Batman Illustrated by Neal Adams Vol. 2	Detective Comics #395, 397, 400, 402, 407, 408, 410; Batman #219; The Brave and the Bold #86, 93; plus various covers	September 2004	HC: 978-1-4012-0269-9
Batman Illustrated by Neal Adams Vol. 3	Batman #232, 234, 237, 243–244, 251, 255; plus various covers and extras	March 2006	HC: 978-1-4012-0407-5
Batman by Neal Adams Omnibus	Detective Comics #395, 397, 400, 402, 407, 408, 410; Batman #219, 232, 234, 237, 243–244, 251, 255; World's Finest Comics #175, 176; The Brave and the Bold #79, 80, 81, 82, 83, 84, 85, 86, 93; Batman: Odyssey #1–6 and Batman: Odyssey (vol. 2) #1–7; covers from Detective Comics #370, 372, 385, 389, 391, 392, 394, 396, 398, 399, 401, 403, 405, 406, 409, 411, 412, 413, 414, 415, 416, 417, 418, 419, 420, 421, 439; Batman #200, 203, 210, 217, 220, 221, 222, 224, 225, 226, 227, 229, 230, 231, 235, 236, 237, 238, 239, 240, 241, 246, Annual #14; World's Finest Comics #174, 178, 179, 180, 182, 183, 185, 186, 199, 200, 202, 211, 244, 245, 246, 258; The Brave and the Bold #75, 76, 86, 88, 89, 90, 93, 95, 99; Heroes Against Hunger #1; Limited Collectors Edition C-51, C-59; The Saga of Ra's al Ghul #4; pages from Detective Comics #600, Limited Collectors' Edition C-25; Robin II: The Joker's Wild! #1 and Batman Black and White #4; plus various extras	March 2016	HC: 978-1-4012-5551-0
Gallery Editions
Batman: Cover to Cover	various Batman comic book covers from several years	May 2005	HC: 978-1-4012-0659-8
Batman: Kelly Jones Gallery Edition	Batman #515–525	December 2014	978-1-4012-5443-8
Superman/Batman: Michael Turner Gallery Edition	Superman/Batman #8–13	January 2015	978-1-4012-5706-4
Batman: Dark Knight Returns Gallery Edition	Batman: The Dark Knight Returns #1–4	January 2016	978-1-4012-6443-7
Other writer/artist collections
Batman by Ed Brubaker Vol. 1	Batman #582–586, 591–596	February 2016	SC: 978-1-4012-6065-1
Batman by Ed Brubaker Vol. 2	Batman #598–607	October 2016	SC: 978-1-4012-6485-7
The Complete Frank Miller Batman	Batman #404–407 ("Batman: Year One"); Batman: The Dark Knight Returns #1–4; "Wanted: Santa Claus – Dead or Alive!" from DC Special Series #21	December 1989	HC: 978-0-681-40969-9
Batman by Doug Moench & Kelley Jones Vol. 1	Batman #515–525, 527–532, 535	March 2014	HC: 978-1-4012-4764-5
Batman by Doug Moench & Kelley Jones Vol. 2	Batman #536–552	August 2018	HC: 978-1-4012-8129-8
Batman by Brian K. Vaughan	Detective Comics #787; Batman #588–590; Wonder Woman #160–161; Batman: Gotham City Secret Files and Origins #1	March 2017	978-1-4012-6838-1

=== DC Omnibuses / Absolute editions / Batman Noir editions / Batman Unwrapped editions / DC Deluxe Editions ===
Title	Material collected	Publication date	ISBN
DC Omnibuses
Batman: The Golden Age Omnibus Vol. 1	Detective Comics #27–56; Batman #1–7; New York's World's Fair Comics #2; World's Best Comics #1; World's Finest Comics #2–3	November 2015	HC: 978-1-4012-6009-5
Batman: The Golden Age Omnibus Vol. 2	Detective Comics #57–74; Batman #8–15; World's Finest Comics #4–9	August 2016	HC: 978-1-4012-6376-8
Batman: The Golden Age Omnibus Vol. 3	Detective Comics #75–92; Batman #16–25; World's Finest Comics #10–14	April 2017	HC: 978-1-4012-6902-9
Batman: The Golden Age Omnibus Vol. 4	Detective Comics #93–112; Batman #26–35; World's Finest Comics #15–22	November 2017	HC: 978-1-4012-7359-0
Batman: The Golden Age Omnibus Vol. 5	Detective Comics #113–132; Batman #36–45; World's Finest Comics #23–32	May 2018	HC: 978-1-4012-7870-0
Batman: The Golden Age Omnibus Vol. 6	Detective Comics #133–153; Batman #46–55; World's Finest Comics #33–42	November 2018	HC: 978-1-4012-8438-1
Batman: The Golden Age Omnibus Vol. 7	Detective Comics #154–173; Batman #56–66; World's Finest Comics #43–53	June 2019	HC: 978-1-4012-8965-2
Batman: The Golden Age Omnibus Vol. 8	Detective Comics #174–191; Batman #67–75; World's Finest Comics #54–62	September 2020	HC: 978-1-4012-9968-2
Batman: The Golden Age Omnibus Vol. 9	Detective Comics #192–210; Batman #76–85; World's Finest Comics #63–70	June 2021	HC: 978-1-77950-445-6
Batman: The Golden Age Omnibus Vol. 10	Detective Comics #211–232; Batman #86–100	September 2023	HC: 978-1-77952-309-9
Batman: The Silver Age Omnibus Vol. 1	Detective Comics #233–257; Batman #101–116	December 2022	HC: 978-1-77951-542-1
Batman/Superman in World's Finest: The Silver Age Omnibus Vol. 1	Superman #76; World's Finest Comics #71–116	March 2016	HC: 978-1-4012-6112-2
Batman/Superman in World's Finest: The Silver Age Omnibus Vol. 2	World's Finest Comics #117–158	April 2019	HC: 978-1-4012-8905-8
Batman: The Bronze Age Omnibus Vol. 1	Detective Comics #393–422; Batman #217–241	October 2026	HC: ISBN 978-1-7995-0849-6
Batman: The Brave and the Bold – The Bronze Age Omnibus Vol. 1	The Brave and the Bold #74–106	January 2017	HC: 978-1-4012-6718-6
Batman: The Brave and the Bold – The Bronze Age Omnibus Vol. 2	The Brave and the Bold #110–156	September 2018	HC: 978-1-4012-8167-0
Batman: The Brave and the Bold – The Bronze Age Omnibus Vol. 3	The Brave and the Bold #157–200	September 2021	HC: 978-1-4012-9282-9
Batman: Knightfall Omnibus Vol. 1	Batman: Vengeance of Bane #1; Batman #491–514; Detective Comics #659–681; material from Showcase '93 #7–8; Batman: Shadow of the Bat #17–34; Robin (vol. 4) #7–13; Catwoman (vol. 2) #6–7; Batman: Legends of the Dark Knight #62–63	April 2017	HC: 978-1-4012-7042-1
Batman: Knightfall Omnibus Vol. 2	Justice League Task Force #5–6; Detective Comics #667–675; Robin (vol. 4) #1; Batman: Shadow of the Bat #19–28; Batman #501–508; Catwoman (vol. 2) #8–11	October 2017	HC: 978-1-4012-7436-8
Batman: Knightfall Omnibus Vol. 3	Batman #509–510, 512–515; Batman: Shadow of the Bat #29–30, 32–35; Detective Comics #676–677, 679–682; Robin (vol. 4) #8–9, 11–14; Catwoman (vol. 2) #12–13; Batman: Legends of the Dark Knight #62–63; material from Showcase '94 #10; Nightwing: Alfred's Return #1; Batman: Vengeance of Bane II - The Redemption	May 2018	HC: 978-1-4012-7849-6
Batman by Neal Adams Omnibus	Detective Comics #395, 397, 400, 402, 407–408, 410; Batman #219, 232, 234, 237, 243–244, 251, 255; World's Finest Comics #175-176; The Brave and the Bold #79-86, 93; Batman: Odyssey #1-6 and Batman: Odyssey (vol. 2) #1–7; covers from Detective Comics #370, 372, 385, 391, 396, 398–399, 401, 403, 405–406, 409, 411–420, 439; Batman #200, 203, 210, 217, 220–222, 224–227, 229–231, 235–241, 246, Annual #14; World's Finest Comics #174, 178–180, 182–183, 185–186, 199–200, 202, 211, 244–246, 258; The Brave and the Bold #75–76, 86, 88–90, 93, 95, 99; Heroes Against Hunger #1; Limited Collectors Edition C-51, C-59; The Saga of Ra's al Ghul #4; pages from Detective Comics #600; Limited Collectors Edition C-25; Robin II: The Joker's Wild! #1; Batman Black and White #4; plus various extras	March 2016	HC: 978-1-4012-5551-0
Gotham Central Omnibus	Gotham Central #1–40	May 2016; April 2022	First HC: 978-1-4012-6192-4; Second HC: 978-1-77951-563-6
Harley Quinn by Amanda Conner and Jimmy Palmlotti Omnibus Vol. One	Harley Quinn (vol. 2) #0–16, Annual #1; Harley Quinn: Futures End #1; Harley Quinn Holiday Special #1; Harley Quinn Valentine's Day Special #1; Harley Quinn Invades Comic-Con International: San Diego #1; Harley Quinn and Power Girl #1–6; material from Secret Origins (vol. 3) #4	September 2017	HC: 978-1-4012-7643-0
Grayson: The Superspy Omnibus	Grayson #1–20, Annual #1–3; Grayson: Futures End #1; Robin War #1–2; Nightwing: Rebirth #1; material from Secret Origins (vol. 3) #8	October 2017; August 2019; November 2022	First HC: 978-1-4012-7416-0; Second HC: 978-1-4012-9505-9; Third HC: 978-1-77951-732-6
Batman and Robin by Peter J. Tomasi and Patrick Gleason Omnibus	Batman and Robin #20–22; Batman and Robin (vol. 2) #0–40, Annual (vol. 2) #1–3; Robin Rises: Omega #1; Robin Rises: Alpha #1; a story from Secret Origins (vol. 3) #4	November 2017	HC: 978-1-4012-7683-6
Harley Quinn & the Gotham City Sirens Omnibus	Gotham City Sirens #1–26; Catwoman (vol. 3) #83	April 2018; February 2020; September 2022	First HC: 978-1-4012-7839-7; Second HC: 978-1-77950-150-9; Third HC: 978-1-77951-676-3
Batman by Grant Morrison Omnibus Vol. One	Batman #655–658, 663–683; stories from 52 #30, 47; DC Universe #0	July 2018	HC: 978-1-4012-8299-8
Batman '66 Omnibus	Batman '66 #1–30; Batman '66: The Lost Episode #1; a story from Solo #7	August 2018	HC: 978-1-4012-8328-5
Batman by Jeph Loeb & Tim Sale Omnibus	Batman: Legends of the Dark Knight Halloween Special; Batman: Madness – A Legends of the Dark Knight Halloween Special; Batman: Ghosts – A Legends of the Dark Knight Halloween Special; Batman: The Long Halloween #1–13; Batman: Dark Victory #0–13; Catwoman: When in Rome #1–6; Superman/Batman #26; stories from Superman/Batman Secret Files and Origins 2003 and Solo #1	September 2018	HC: 978-1-4012-8426-8
Batman: The Arkham Saga Omnibus	Batman: Arkham Origins #1–14; Batman: Arkham Asylum – The Road to Arkham #1; Batman: Arkham City #1–5; Batman: Arkham City Digital Chapter #1–7; Batman: Arkham Unhinged #1–20; Batman: Arkham Unhinged – End Game #1; Batman: Arkham Knight #1–12, Annual #1; Batman: Arkham Knight – Robin #1; Batman: Arkham Knight – Batgirl Begins #1; Batman: Arkham Knight – Batgirl & Harley Quinn #1; Batman: Arkham Knight Genesis #1–6	September 2018	HC: 978-1-4012-8432-9
Harley Quinn by Amanda Conner and Jimmy Palmlotti Omnibus Vol. Two	Harley Quinn (vol. 2) #17–30; DC Sneak Peek: Harley Quinn #1; Harley Quinn Road Trip Special #1; Harley Quinn: Be Careful What You Wish For #1; Harley Quinn and Her Gang of Harleys #1–6; Harley's Little Black Book #1–6	October 2018	HC: 978-1-4012-8456-5
Batman by Grant Morrison Omnibus Vol. Two	Batman #700–702; Batman and Robin #1–16; Batman: The Return of Bruce Wayne #1–6	June 2019	HC: 978-1-4012-8883-9
Batman Eternal Omnibus	Batman Eternal #1–52; Batman (vol. 2) #28	September 2019	HC: 978-1-4012-9417-5
Batman & Robin Eternal Omnibus	Batman & Robin Eternal #1-26	March 2016	HC: 978-1 77952-303-7
Harley Quinn by Amanda Conner and Jimmy Palmlotti Omnibus Vol. Three	Harley Quinn (vol. 3) #1–34; Harley Quinn 25th Anniversary Special #1; material from Batman Day Special #1	October 2019	HC: 978-1-4012-9446-5
Batman by Scott Snyder and Greg Capullo Omnibus Vol. 1	Batman (vol. 2) #0–33, #23.2, Annual (vol. 2) #1–2	November 2019	HC: 978-1-4012-9884-5
Batman Black and White Omnibus	Batman Black and White #1–4, (vol. 2) #1–6; material from Batman: Gotham Knights #1–49; five new short stories	December 2019	HC: 978-1-4012-9573-8
Batman by Grant Morrison Omnibus Vol. Three	Batman: The Return #1; Batman Incorporated #1–8; Batman incorporated: Leviathan Strikes! #1; Batman, Incorporated (vol. 2) #0–13; Batman, Incorporated Special #1	August 2020	HC: 978-1-77950-271-1
Batman by Paul Dini Omnibus	Batman #685; Detective Comics (vol. 3) #821–824, 826–828, 831, 833–834, 837–841, 843–850, 852, 1000; Batman Annual (vol. 3) #1; Batman: Streets of Gotham #1–4, 7, 10–14, 16–21; DCU Holiday Special #1; short stories from Batman: Gotham Knights #14 and Batman Black and White (vol. 2) #3	September 2020	HC: 978-1-77950-551-4
Batman: Road to No Man's Land Omnibus	Detective Comics #719–722, 724–729; Batman #554–562; Batman: Shadow of the Bat #73–82; Nightwing (vol. 2) #19–20; Catwoman (vol. 2) #56–57; Robin (vol. 4) #52–54; Azrael: Agent of the Bat #40, 47–50; Batman/Huntress/Spoiler: Blunt Trauma #1; Batman: Arkham Asylum - Tales of Madness #1; Batman: Blackgate - Isle of Men #1; short stories from The Batman Chronicles #12, 14–15	November 2020	HC: 978-1-77950-661-0
Batman: The Rise and Fall of the Batmen Omnibus	Detective Comics #934–981, Annual (vol. 2) #1; pages from Detective Comics #1000; Batman (vol. 3) #7–8; Nightwing (vol. 4) #5–6	December 2020	HC: 978-1-77950-665-8
Nightwing: The Prince of Gotham Omnibus	Nightwing (vol. 3) #0–30, Annual (vol. 2) #1; Batman (vol. 2) #17; Young Romance: The New 52 Valentine's Day Special #1; material from Secret Origins (vol. 3) #1	December 2020	HC: 978-1-77950-700-6
Batgirl Returns by Gail Simone Omnibus	Batgirl (vol. 4) #0–34, Annual (vol. 2) #1–2; Batgirl: Futures End #1; Batman: The Dark Knight (vol. 2) #23.1; Young Romance: The New 52 Valentine's Day Special #1	March 2021	HC: 978-1-77950-719-8
Batman by Scott Snyder and Greg Capullo Omnibus Vol. 2	Detective Comics (vol. 2) #27; Detective Comics #1000; Batman (vol. 2) #34–52, Annual (vol. 2) #3–4; Batman: Futures End #1; DC Sneak Peek: Batman #1; Batman: Last Knight on Earth #1–3	November 2021	HC: 978-1-77951-326-7
Batman: No Man's Land Omnibus Vol. 1	Detective Comics #730–735; Batman #563–568; Batman: Legends of the Dark Knight #116–121; Batman: Shadow of the Bat #83–88; Nightwing (vol. 2) #35–37; Catwoman (vol. 2) #72–74; Robin (vol. 4) #67; Azrael: Agent of the Bat #51–57; Batman: Harley Quinn #1; Young Justice in No Man's Land #1; Batman: No Man's Land (collector's) #1, Batman: No Man's Land Gallery #1; short stories from The Batman Chronicles #16–17	January 2022	HC: 978-1-77951-322-9
Batgirl of Burnside Omnibus	Batgirl (vol. 4) #35–52, Annual (vol. 2) #3; DC Sneak Peek: Batgirl #1; material from Secret Origins (vol. 3) #10	January 2022	HC: 978-1-77951-329-8
Catwoman of East End Omnibus	Detective Comics #759–762; Catwoman (vol. 2) #1–37; Catwoman Secret Files and Origins #1; Catwoman: Selina's Big Score	June 2022	HC: 978-1-77951-503-2
Batman: No Man's Land Omnibus Vol. 2	Detective Comics #736–741; Batman #569–574; Batman: Legends of the Dark Knight #122–126; Batman: Shadow of the Bat #89–94; Nightwing (vol. 2) #38–39; Catwoman (vol. 2) #75–77; Robin (vol. 4) #68–73; Batman: No Man's Land (collector's) #0; Batman: No Man's Land Secret Files and Origins #1; short stories from The Batman Chronicles #18	August 2022	HC: 978-1-77951-714-2
Dark Nights: Metal Omnibus	Dark Nights: Metal #1–6; Dark Nights: Metal Director's Cut #1; Batman: Lost #1; Dark Days: The Forge #1; Dark Days: The Casting #1; Dark Knights Rising: The Wild Hunt #1; Batman: The Red Death #1; Batman: The Merciless #1; Batman: The Murder Machine #1; Batman: The Dawnbreaker #1; Batman: The Devastator #1; Batman: The Drowned #1; The Batman Who Laughs #1; Teen Titans (vol. 6) #12; Green Arrow (vol. 6) #32; Suicide Squad (vol. 5) #26; The Flash (vol. 5) #33; Nightwing (vol. 4) #29; Hal Jordan and the Green Lantern Corps #32; Justice League (vol. 4) #32–33; Hawkman: Found #1	January 2023	HC: 978-1-77951-703-6
Batgirl: The Bronze Age Omnibus Vol. 1	Detective Comics #359, 363, 369, 371, 384–385, 388–389, 392–393, 396–397, 400–401, 404–424; Batman #197; Batman Family #1, 3–7, 9–11	December 2017	HC: 978-1-4012-7640-9
Batgirl: The Bronze Age Omnibus Vol. 2	Batman Family #12–20; Detective Comics #481–499, 501–502, 505–506, 508–510, 512–519; Batgirl Special #1	April 2019	HC: 978-1-4012-8841-9
The Joker: The Bronze Age Omnibus	Batman #251, 260, 286, 291–294, 321, 353, 365–366, 400; Detective Comics #475–476, 504, 526, 532; The Brave and the Bold #111, 118, 129–130, 141, 191; Justice League of America #77; The Joker #1–10; DC Comics Presents #41, 72; the Huntress back-up stories from Wonder Woman #280–283; a page from Who's Who: The Definitive Directory of the DC Universe Volume XI Note: The Joker #10 (which would have been cover-dated November–December 1976 if it had been published as originally planned) is published here for the first time ever. In October 2019, it was republished as an individual issue (see Ongoing series above). It was intended to be the first issue of a multi-part story (which would possibly have lasted either two or three issues, no one knows which), but the story was never finished due to the series' cancellation with issue #9.	August 2019	HC: 978-1-4012-9340-6
Robin: The Bronze Age Omnibus	Detective Comics #390–391, 394–395, 398–403, 445, 447, 450–451, 481–485; Batman #192, 202–203, 227, 229–231, 234–236, 239–242, 244–245, 248, 250, 252, 254, 259, 333, 337–339, 341–343; World's Finest Comics #200; Batman Family #1, 3, 4–9, 11–20; DC Comics Presents #31, 58	March 2020	HC: 978-1-77950-085-4
Absolute editions
Absolute Batman: Hush	Batman #608–619; plus extras	October 2005	HC: 978-1-4012-0426-6
Absolute Dark Knight	The Dark Knight Returns #1–4; The Dark Knight Strikes Again #1–3; plus extras	August 2006	HC: 978-1-4012-1079-3
Absolute Batman: The Long Halloween	Batman: The Long Halloween #1–13; plus extras	April 2007	HC: 978-1-4012-1282-7
Absolute Batman: Dark Victory	Batman: Dark Victory #0–13	May 2012	HC: 978-1-4012-3510-9
Absolute Batman and Robin: Batman Reborn	Batman and Robin #1–16; Batman: The Return #1	January 2013	HC: 978-1-4012-3737-0
Absolute Superman/Batman Vol. 1	Superman/Batman #1–13	September 2013	HC: 978-1-4012-4096-7
Absolute Joker / Luthor	Lex Luthor: Man of Steel #1–5; Joker	October 2013	HC: 978-1-4012-4504-7
Absolute Batman: Haunted Knight	Batman: Legends of the Dark Knight Halloween Special; Batman: Madness – A Legends of the Dark Knight Halloween Special; Batman: Ghosts – A Legends of the Dark Knight Halloween Special; Catwoman: When in Rome #1–6	December 2014	HC: 978-1-4012-3510-9
Absolute Superman/Batman Vol. 2	Superman/Batman #14–26	May 2014	HC: 978-1-4012-4817-8
Absolute All-Star Batman and Robin the Boy Wonder	All-Star Batman and Robin the Boy Wonder #1–10	July 2014	HC: 978-1-4012-4763-8
Absolute Batman Incorporated	Batman Incorporated #1–8; Batman Incorporated: Leviathan Strikes! #1; Batman, Incorporated (vol. 2) #1–13; Batman, Incorporated Special #1	January 2015	HC: 978-1-4012-5121-5
Absolute Batman: The Court of Owls	Batman (vol. 2) #1–11	November 2015	HC: 978-1-4012-5910-5
Absolute Batman: Year One	Batman #404–407	November 2016	HC: 978-1-4012-4379-1
Absolute Batman: The Killing Joke – The 30th Anniversary Edition	Batman: The Killing Joke; a short story from Batman Black and White #4; plus extras	September 2018	HC: 978-1-4012-8412-1
Absolute Batman: The Dark Knight III – The Master Race	Batman: The Dark Knight III - The Master Race #1–9; Dark Knight Presents: The Atom #1 / Wonder Woman #1 / Green Lantern #1 - Hal Jordan / Batgirl #1 / Lara #1 / World's Finest #1 / Strange Adventures #1 / Detective Comics #1 / Action Comics #1	December 2019	HC: 978-1-4012-9962-0
Absolute Dark Nights: Metal	Dark Nights: Metal #1–6; Dark Nights: Metal Director's Cut #1; Batman: Lost #1; Dark Knights Rising: The Wild Hunt #1	November 2022	HC: 978-1-77951-527-8
Absolute Batman: Three Jokers	Batman: Three Jokers #1–3; plus extras	May 2023	
Batman Noir editions
Batman Noir: Eduardo Risso – The Deluxe Edition	Batman #620–625; Flashpoint – Batman: Knight of Vengeance #1–3; stories from Wednesday Comics #1–12; a short story from Batman: Gotham Knights #8	June 2013	HC: 978-1-4012-3890-2
Batman Noir: The Long Halloween	Batman: The Long Halloween #1–14	October 2014	HC: 978-1-4012-4883-3
Batman Noir: The Dark Knight Returns	Batman: The Dark Knight Returns #1–4	June 2015	HC: 978-1-4012-5514-5
Batman Noir: Hush	Batman #609–619	September 2015	HC: 978-1-4012-5803-0
Batman Noir: The Black Mirror	Detective Comics #871–877	February 2016	HC: 978-1-4012-5968-6
Batman Noir: The Killing Joke	Batman: The Killing Joke	August 2016	HC: 978-1-4012-6364-5
Batman Noir: Dark Victory	Batman: Dark Victory #0–13	July 2017	HC: 978-1-4012-7106-0
Batman Noir: The Court of Owls	Batman (vol. 2) #1–11	December 2017	HC: 978-1-4012-7395-8
Batman Noir: The Dark Knight Strikes Again	Batman: The Dark Knight Strikes Again #1–3	April 2018	HC: 978-1-4012-7804-5
Batman Unwrapped editions
Batman: Hush Unwrapped – The Deluxe Edition	Batman #609–619	July 2011	HC: 978-1-4012-2992-4
Batman Unwrapped by Andy Kubert	Batman #655–658, 664–666, 686, 700; Detective Comics #846, 852–853	March 2014	HC: 978-1-4012-4242-8
Batman Unwrapped: The Court of Owls	Batman (vol. 2) #1–11	September 2014	HC: 978-1-4012-4507-8
Batman: The Dark Knight Unwrapped by David Finch	Batman: The Dark Knight #1–3; Batman: The Return #1; Batman: The Dark Knight (vol. 2) #1–7, 9	May 2015	HC: 978-1-4012-4884-0
Batman R.I.P. Unwrapped	Batman #676–681	November 2015	HC: 978-1-4012-5688-3
Batman Unwrapped: Death of the Family	Batman (vol. 2) #13–17	December 2017	HC: 978-1-4012-7488-7
DC Deluxe Editions
Batman: The Killing Joke – The Deluxe Edition	Batman: The Killing Joke; a colorized short story from Batman Black and White #4	March 2008	HC: 978-1-4012-1667-2
Batman: Whatever Happened to the Caped Crusader? The Deluxe Edition	Batman #686; Detective Comics #853; stories from Secret Origins (vol. 2) #36 and Secret Origins Special #1; a short story from Batman Black and White #2	July 2009	HC: 978-1-4012-2303-8
Batman and Robin Vol. 1: Batman Reborn – The Deluxe Edition	Batman and Robin #1-6	April 2010	HC: 978-1-4012-2566-7
Batman: R.I.P. – The Deluxe Edition	Batman #676–683; DC Universe #0	June 2010	HC: 978-1-4012-2576-6
Batman and Robin Vol. 2: Batman vs. Robin – The Deluxe Edition	Batman and Robin #7–12	November 2010	HC: 978-1-4012-2833-0
Batman: The Return of Bruce Wayne – The Deluxe Edition	Batman: The Return of Bruce Wayne #1–6	February 2011	HC: 978-1-4012-2968-9
Batman and Robin Vol. 3: Batman and Robin Must Die! – The Deluxe Edition	Batman and Robin #13–16; Batman: The Return #1	May 2011	HC: 978-1-4012-3091-3
Planetary/Batman: The Deluxe Edition	Planetary/Batman: Night on Earth	June 2011	HC: 978-1-4012-3184-2
Batman: Hush Unwrapped – The Deluxe Edition	Batman #609–619	July 2011	HC: 978-1-4012-2992-4
Batman: Noël – The Deluxe Edition		November 2011	HC: 978-1-4012-3213-9
Batman: The Dark Knight – Golden Dawn Deluxe Edition	Batman: The Dark Knight #1–5; Batman: The Return #1; Superman/Batman #75	January 2012	HC: 978-1-4012-3215-3
Batman: Year One – The Deluxe Edition	Batman #404–407	March 2012	HC: 978-1-4012-3342-6
Batman Incorporated Vol. 1: The Deluxe Edition	Batman Incorporated #1–8; Batman Incorporated: Leviathan Strikes! #1	April 2012	HC: 978-1-4012-3212-2
Batman: The Black Glove – The Deluxe Edition	Batman #655–658, 663–669, 672–675	June 2012	HC: 978-1-4012-3336-5
Batman: Death by Design – The Deluxe Edition		June 2012	HC: 978-1-4012-3453-9
Batman/Deathblow: After the Fire – The Deluxe Edition	Batman/Deathblow: After the Fire #1–3	February 2013	HC: 978-1-4012-3772-1
Batman Noir: Eduardo Risso – The Deluxe Edition	Batman #620–625; Flashpoint - Batman: Knight of Vengeance #1–3; stories from Wednesday Comics #1–12; a short story from Batman: Gotham Knights #8	June 2013	HC: 978-1-4012-3890-2
Arkham Asylum: Living Hell – The Deluxe Edition	Arkham Asylum: Living Hell #1–6	June 2014	HC: 978-1-4012-4751-5
Damian, Son of Batman – The Deluxe Edition	Damian, Son of Batman #1–4; Batman #666	July 2014	HC: 978-1-4012-4642-6
Batman: Arkham Asylum 25th Anniversary – The Deluxe Edition		November 2014	HC: 978-1-4012-5124-6
The Batman Adventures: Mad Love – The Deluxe Edition		April 2015	HC: 978-1-4012-5512-1
Batman: Gothic – The Deluxe Edition	Batman: Legends of the Dark Knight #6–10	July 2015	HC: 978-1-4012-5516-9
Batman: Year 100 and Other Tales – The Deluxe Edition	Batman: Year 100 #1–4; stories including "The Berlin Batman", "Broken Nose" and "Teenage Sidekick"	October 2015	HC: 978-1-4012-5807-8
Batman: The Dark Knight Saga – The Deluxe Edition	The Dark Knight Returns #1–4; The Dark Knight Strikes Again #1–3	November 2015	HC: 978-1-4012-5691-3
Batman/Superman/Wonder Woman: Trinity – The Deluxe Edition	Batman/Superman/Wonder Woman: Trinity #1–3	January 2016	HC: 978-1-4012-5690-6
Batman: Harley and Ivy – The Deluxe Edition	Batman: Harley and Ivy #1–3; The Batman Adventures Annual #1; The Batman Adventures Holiday Special #1; Batman & Robin Adventures #8; The Batgirl Adventures #1; short stories from Batman: Gotham Knights #14 and Batman Black and White (vol. 2) #3	February 2016	HC: 978-1-4012-6080-4
Dark Knight Returns: The Last Crusade – The Deluxe Edition		December 2016	HC: 978-1-4012-6506-9
Batman: Death and the Maidens – The Deluxe Edition	Batman: Death and the Maidens #1–9	January 2017	HC: 978-1-4012-6593-9
Batman: Ego and Other Tails – The Deluxe Edition	Batman: Ego; Catwoman: Selina's Big Score; stories from Solo #1, 5; short stories from Batman: Gotham Knights #23, 33	April 2017	HC: 978-1-4012-7239-5
Batman/Two-Face: Face the Face Deluxe Edition	Detective Comics #817, Batman #651, Detective Comics #818, Batman #652, Detective Comics #819, Batman #653, Detective Comics #820 and Batman #654	May 2017	HC: 978-1-4012-6572-4
Batman by Brian Azzarello and Eduardo Risso Deluxe Edition	Batman #620–625; Flashpoint - Batman: Knight of Vengeance #1–3; stories from Wednesday Comics #1–12; a short story from Batman: Gotham Knights #8	July 2017	HC: 978-1-4012-7101-5
Batman: The Dark Knight III – The Master Race: The Covers Deluxe Edition	All of the covers, variant covers and mini-comic covers of all nine issues of Batman: The Dark Knight III - The Master Race and all nine of its nine tie-in issues	September 2017	HC: 978-1-4012-6738-4
Harley Quinn by Karl Kesel and Terry Dodson: The Deluxe Edition Book One	Harley Quinn #1–8	September 2017	HC: 978-1-4012-7642-3
Batman: Year Two: The 30th Anniversary Deluxe Edition	Detective Comics #575–578; Batman: Full Circle	November 2017	HC: 978-1-4012-7456-6
Batman: Hush – The 15th Anniversary Deluxe Edition	Batman #608–619; material from Wizard #0	November 2017	HC: 978-1-4012-7649-2
Dark Nights: Metal – The Deluxe Edition	Dark Nights: Metal #1–6	June 2018	HC: 978-1-4012-7732-1
Batman/Teenage Mutant Ninja Turtles: The Deluxe Edition	Batman/Teenage Mutant Ninja Turtles #1–6, plus extras	July 2018	HC: 978-1-4012-8071-0
Batman/Catwoman: The Wedding Album – The Deluxe Edition	Batman (vol. 3) #24, 44, 50	September 2018	HC: 978-1-4012-8653-8
Batman: Gates of Gotham – The Deluxe Edition	Batman: Gates of Gotham #1–5; Detective Comics Annual #12; Batman Annual #28	November 2018	HC: 978-1-4012-8420-6
Batman by Francis Manapul and Brian Buccellato: The Deluxe Edition	Detective Comics (vol. 2) #30–40, Annual (vol. 2) #1; Detective Comics: Futures End #1; Detective Comics: Endgame #1	November 2018	HC: 978-1-4012-8485-5
Harley Quinn by Karl Kesel and Terry Dodson: The Deluxe Edition Book Two	Harley Quinn #9–19	November 2018	HC: 978-1-4012-8509-8
Batman: White Knight – The Deluxe Edition	Batman: White Knight #1–8	March 2020	HC: 978-1-77950-064-9
Batman: City of Crime – The Deluxe Edition	Detective Comics #800–808, 811–814	March 2020	HC: 978-1-4012-9948-4
Joker: The Deluxe Edition	Joker; a story from The Joker 80th Anniversary 100-Page Super Spectacular #1	June 2020	HC: 978-1-4012-9428-1
Dark Knight Returns: The Golden Child – The Deluxe Edition		September 2020	HC: 978-1-77950-391-6
Batman: Gotham by Gaslight – The Deluxe Edition	Gotham by Gaslight: An Alternative History of the Batman; Batman: Master of the Future; Countdown Presents: The Search for Ray Palmer - Gotham by Gaslight #1; Convergence: Shazam! #1–2	October 2020	HC: 978-1-4012-9982-8
Batman: The Man Who Laughs – The Deluxe Edition	Batman: The Man Who Laughs; Detective Comics #784–786	October 2020	HC: 978-1-77950-302-2
Batman by Tom King & Lee Weeks: The Deluxe Edition	Batman (vol. 3) #51–53, 67; Batman/Elmer Fudd Special #1	November 2020	HC: 978-1-77950-574-3
Dark Knights: Death Metal Deluxe Edition	Dark Knights: Death Metal #1–6	April 2021	HC: 978-1-77950-794-5
Batman: A Death in the Family – The Deluxe Edition	Batman #426–429, 440–442; The New Titans #60–61; never-before-reprinted alternate pages from Batman #428	April 2021	HC: 978-1-77950-917-8
Batman by John Ridley: The Deluxe Edition	Batman Black and White (vol. 2) #3; Batman: The Joker War Zone #1; Future State: The Next Batman #1–4; a previously unpublished story by John Ridley and Dustin Nguyan	June 2021	HC: 978-1-77951-126-3
Batman: The Long Halloween Deluxe Edition	Batman: The Long Halloween #1–12	October 2021	HC: 978-1-77951-269-7
Batman: The Long Halloween Deluxe Edition – The Sequel: Dark Victory	Batman: Dark Victory #0–13; Batman: Dark Victory (New Edition)	January 2022	HC: 978-1-77951-483-7
Batman: The Long Halloween Deluxe Edition – Catwoman: When in Rome	Catwoman: When in Rome #1–6	March 2022	HC: 978-1-77951-502-5
Batman: Curse of the White Knight – The Deluxe Edition	Batman: Curse of the White Knight #1–8; Batman: White Knight Presents Von Freeze	September 2022	HC: 978-1-77951-681-7
Batman: The Long Halloween Deluxe Edition – The Prequel: Haunted Knight	Batman: Legends of the Dark Knight Halloween Special; Batman: Madness - A Legends of the Dark Knight Halloween Special; Batman: Ghosts - A Legends of the Dark Knight Halloween Special	October 2022	HC: 978-1-77951-638-1
Batman: Hush – The 20th Anniversary Deluxe Edition	Batman #608–619; material from Wizard #0	October 2022	HC: 978-1-77951-719-7
Batman/Spawn: The Deluxe Edition	Batman/Spawn: War Devil; Spawn/Batman; Batman/Spawn; a gallery of behind-the-scenes art	April 2023	HC: 978-1-77952-281-8
Batman Rebirth Deluxe Edition Book 1	Batman: Rebirth #1; Batman (vol. 3) #1–12	September 2017	HC: 978-1-4012-7132-9
Batman Rebirth Deluxe Edition Book 2	Batman (vol. 3) #16–32, Annual (vol. 2) #1	June 2018	HC: 978-1-4012-8035-2
Batman Rebirth Deluxe Edition Book 3	Batman (vol. 3) #33–43, Annual (vol. 2) #2	December 2018	HC: 978-1-4012-8521-0
Batman Rebirth Deluxe Edition Book 4	Batman (vol. 3) #44–57; DC Nation #0	July 2019	HC: 978-1-4012-9188-4
Batman: Detective Comics Rebirth Deluxe Edition Book 1	Detective Comics #934–949	November 2017	HC: 978-1-4012-7608-9
Batman: Detective Comics Rebirth Deluxe Edition Book 2	Detective Comics #950–964	May 2018	HC: 978-1-4012-7857-1
Batman: Detective Comics Rebirth Deluxe Edition Book 3	Detective Comics #965–974, Annual (vol. 2) #1	October 2018	HC: 978-1-4012-8481-7
Batman: Detective Comics Rebirth Deluxe Edition Book 4	Detective Comics #974–982	April 2019	HC: 978-1-4012-8910-2
Batman: Detective Comics #1000 Deluxe Edition	Detective Comics #1000; a story from Detective Comics: Batman 80th Anniversary Giant #1; an all-new story published here for the first time ever; all of the issue's variant covers	June 2019	HC: 978-1-4012-9419-9
Batman: Detective Comics #1027 Deluxe Edition	Detective Comics #1027; all of the issue's variant covers	November 2020	HC: 978-1-77950-674-0
Harley Quinn Rebirth Deluxe Edition Book 1	Harley Quinn (vol. 3) #1–13	September 2017	HC: 978-1-4012-7368-2
Harley Quinn Rebirth Deluxe Edition Book 2	Harley Quinn (vol. 3) #14–27; Harley Quinn 25th Anniversary Special #1	July 2018	HC: 978-1-4012-8065-9
Harley Quinn Rebirth Deluxe Edition Book 3	Harley Quinn (vol. 3) #28–42	January 2019	HC: 978-1-4012-8553-1
Robin: Year One – The Deluxe Edition	Robin: Year One #1–4, plus extras	February 2018	HC: 978-1-4012-7764-2
Batgirl: Year One – The Deluxe Edition	Batgirl: Year One #1–9, plus extras	February 2019	HC: 978-1-4012-8793-1
Nightwing: Year One – The Deluxe Edition	Nightwing (vol. 2) #101–106, plus extras	June 2020	HC: 978-1-77950-257-5

=== Anthology editions ===
The decade editions (see below) reprint the "best" stories of each decade of the 20th century almost from the beginning of the characters' history onward (except for the 1930s and the 1990s, which were not included for unknown reasons) in trade paperbacks.

Title	Material collected	Publication date	ISBN
The Greatest Batman Stories Ever Told
The Greatest Batman Stories Ever Told	Stories from Batman #1, 25, 47, 61, 156, 234, 250, 312; Detective Comics #31–32, 211, 235, 345, 404, 429, 437, 442, 457, 474, 482, 500; World's Finest Comics #94; The Brave and the Bold #197; Star-Spangled Comics #124; DC Special Series #15; the 1943–1946 newspaper comic strip (Sunday comics)	November 1988; October 1997	HC: 0-930289-35-8; SC: 978-0-930289-66-9
The Greatest Joker Stories Ever Told	Stories from Batman #1, 4, 63, 73, 74, 110, 159, 163, 251, 321; Detective Comics #168, 475–476; World's Finest Comics #61, 88; Batman Kellogg's Special #2; The Brave and the Bold #111; The Joker #3; the 1943–1946 newspaper comic strip (Sunday comics)	December 1988; October 1997	HC: 0-930289-36-6; SC: 978-0-930289-36-2
Stacked Deck: The Greatest Joker Stories Ever Told – Expanded Edition	Stories from Batman #1, 4, 63, 73, 74, 110, 159, 163, 251, 321, 353; Detective Comics #168, 475–476, 569–570; World's Finest Comics #61, 88; Batman Kellogg's Special #2; The Brave and the Bold #111; The Joker #3; the 1943–1946 newspaper comic strip (Sunday comics)	November 1990	HC: 978-0-681-41015-2
The Greatest Batman Stories Ever Told Vol. 2	Stories from Batman #1, 62, 76, 169, 190, 197, 256, 257, 345–346, 355, Annual #11; Detective Comics #58, 203, 473, 568; This volume contains stories featuring the Penguin and the Catwoman.	July 1992	SC: 978-0-446-39427-7
Batman featuring Two-Face and the Riddler	Stories from Batman #179, Annual #14; Detective Comics #66, 68, 140, 377; stories from Secret Origins Special #1; Despite the title, this is the last volume of this series and, as such, probably should have been titled The Greatest Batman Stories Ever Told Vol. 3.	August 1995	SC: 978-1-56389-198-4
The Greatest Stories Ever Told (the Batman volumes)
Batman: The Greatest Stories Ever Told	Stories from Batman #5, 62, 156, 250–251; Batman: Gotham Knights #32; Legends of the Dark Knight #79; DC Special Series #15, #21; Detective Comics #33, 439, 574	May 2005	SC: 978-1-4012-0444-0
Batman: The Greatest Stories Ever Told Vol. 2	Stories from Batman #1, 108, 153, 246; The Batman Chronicles #5, 21; The Brave and the Bold #184; Detective Comics #526; Batgirl: Year One #4; a story from Secret Origins (vol. 2) #6	February 2007	SC: 978-1-4012-1214-8
Superman/Batman: The Greatest Stories Ever Told	Stories from Superman #76; World's Finest Comics #142, 159, 176, 207; The Man of Steel #3; Batman and Superman: World's Finest Book 7; Superman/Batman Annual #1; Superman/Batman Secret Files and Origins 2003	March 2007	SC: 978-1-4012-1227-8
The Joker: The Greatest Stories Ever Told	Stories from Batman #1, 66, 73, 110, 321, 613; Detective Comics #332, 475–476, 826; Batman: The Long Halloween #4; The Batman Adventures Annual #1; a short story from Batman Black and White Vol. 2	June 2008	SC: 978-1-4012-1808-9
Batgirl: The Greatest Stories Ever Told	Stories from Detective Comics #359, 396, 400, 422–424; Batman Family #1, 9; Legends of the DC Universe #10-11; a short story from The Batman Chronicles #9	December 2010	SC: 978-1-4012-2924-5
Decade editions
Batman in the Forties	Stories from Batman #7, 15, 20, 31, 37, 47, 49; Detective Comics #27, 38, 49, 80; Real Fact Comics #5; Star-Spangled Comics #70; World's Finest Comics #30	March 2004	SC: 978-1-4012-0206-4
Batman in the Fifties	Stories from Batman #62, 81, 92, 105, 113, 121, 128; Detective Comics #156, 168, 185, 216, 233, 244, 252, 267; World's Finest Comics #81	April 2004	SC: 978-1-56389-810-5
Batman in the Sixties	Stories from Batman #131, 144, 148, 155, 179, 181, 200, 217; Batman Kellogg's Special #6; Detective Comics #298, 341, 349, 369, 388, 391	February 2004	SC: 978-1-56389-491-6
Batman in the Seventies	Stories from Batman #232, 237, 260; Batman Family #1; DC Super Stars #17; Detective Comics #407, 410, 442, 457, 481	August 2003	SC: 978-1-56389-565-4
Batman in the Eighties	Stories from Batman #321, 348, 374; Batman Special #1; DC Sampler #3; Detective Comics #500, 518, 519, 571; The New Titans #55	September 2004	SC: 978-1-4012-0241-5
Batman: Arkham
Batman: Arkham – The Riddler	Stories from Detective Comics #140, 142, 377, 822, 837, Batman #171, 179, 292, 317, 362, The Brave and the Bold #183, Joker's Asylum II: The Riddler #1; Legends of the Dark Knight 100-Page Spectacular #2; Batman (vol. 2) #23.2	May 2015	SC: 978-1-4012-5513-8
Batman: Arkham – Two-Face	Stories from Detective Comics #66, 68, 80, 563–564; Batman #234, 346, 397–398, 410–411; World's Finest Comics #173; Batman: Two-Face; Joker's Asylum: Two-Face #1; Batman and Robin (vol. 2) #23.1; a short story from The Batman Chronicles #8; pages from Who's Who: The Definitive Directory of the DC Universe Volume XXIV, Who's Who in the DC Universe #11 and Batman Villains Secret Files and Origins #1	October 2015	SC: 978-1-4012-5815-3
Batman: Arkham – Scarecrow	Stories from Detective Comics #73, 389, 486, 540; Batman #189, 296, 373, 523–524. Annual #19; World's Finest #3; Detective Comics (vol. 2) #23.3; Joker's Asylum: Scarecrow #1; pages from Who's Who: The Definitive Directory of the DC Universe Volume XX, Who's Who in the DC Universe #1 and Batman Villains Secret Files and Origins #1	April 2016	SC: 978-1-4012-6062-0
Batman: Arkham – Killer Croc	Stories from Detective Comics #525, 660, 808–810; Batman #358, 359, 471, 489, 512, 521–522; Batman and Robin (vol. 2) #23.4; Joker's Asylum II: Killer Croc #1; a short story from The Batman Chronicles #3; pages from Who's Who: The Definitive Directory of the DC Universe Volume V, Who's Who in the DC Universe #7 and Batman Villains Secret Files and Origins 2005	June 2016	SC: 978-1-4012-6345-4
Batman: Arkham – Poison Ivy	Stories from Batman #181, 339; Batman: Legends of the Dark Knight #42–43; Batman: Poison Ivy; Batman: Shadow of the Bat Annual #3; Detective Comics (vol. 2) #23.1; Gotham City Sirens #8; Joker's Asylum: Poison Ivy #1; World's Finest Comics #251-252; a story from Secret Origins (vol. 2) #36; a short story from The Batman Chronicles #10; pages from Who's Who: The Definitive Directory of the DC Universe Volume XVIII, Who's Who in the DC Universe #5 and Batman Villains Secret Files and Origins #1	September 2016	SC: 978-1-4012-6445-1
Batman: Arkham – Man-Bat	Stories from Detective Comics #400, 402, 407; Man-Bat #1–2; Man-Bat (vol. 2) #1–3; Showcase '94 #11; Batman: Legends of the Dark Knight Annual #5; Detective Comics (vol. 2) #23.4; a story from Secret Origins (vol. 2) #39; a short story from Batman Black and White #2; a page from Who's Who in the DC Universe #12	January 2017	SC: 978-1-4012-6592-2
Batman: Arkham – Mister Freeze	Stories from Detective Comics #373, 595; Batman #121, 308, 375, 525, Annual #1; Batman: Gotham Knights #59; Batman: Legends of the Dark Knight #190-191; Batman: Mr. Freeze	May 2017	SC: 978-1-4012-6887-9
Batman: Arkham – Clayface	Stories from Detective Comics #40, 298, 478–479; Batman #550; Batman and the Outsiders #21; Secret Origins (vol. 2) #44; Catwoman #4; Batman: Gotham Knights #69–71; Batman Villains Secret Files and Origins #1; Batman: The Dark Knight (vol. 2) #23.3	July 2017	SC: 978-1-4012-7144-2
Batman: Arkham – Joker's Daughter	Stories from Batman Family #6, 8–9, 16, 19; Detective Comics #482–483; Batman: Joker's Daughter #1; Batman: The Dark Knight (vol. 2) #23.4; Titans Secret Files and Origins #2; Teen Titans/Outsiders Secret Files and Origins #1	December 2017	SC: 978-1-4012-7501-3
Batman: Arkham – Hugo Strange	Stories from Detective Comics #36, 471–472, 942; Batman #356, Annual #10; Batman: Gotham Knights #8–11; a page from Who's Who: The Definitive Directory of the DC Universe Volume XVIII	April 2018	SC: 978-1-4012-7470-2
Batman: Arkham – Penguin	Stories from Detective Comics #58, 610–611, 824; Batman #155, 374, 548–549; Batman: Penguin Triumphant; Joker's Asylum: Penguin #1	September 2018	SC: 978-1-4012-8173-1
Batman: Arkham – Ra's al Ghul	Stories from Detective Comics #750; Batman #232, 243–244, Annual #26; DC Special Series #15; The Brave and the Bold #159; Nightwing #152; Batman and Robin (vol. 2) #23.3; a page from Who's Who in the DC Universe #13	April 2019	SC: 978-1-4012-8881-5
Batman: Arkham – Black Mask	Stories from Detective Comics #553; Batman #386–387, 484–485, 648; Catwoman (vol. 3) #16, 83; Robin (vol. 4) #130; Year of the Villain: Black Mask #1; a page from Batman Villains Secret Files and Origins 2005	December 2019	SC: 978-1-4012-9835-7
Batman: Arkham – Victor Zsasz	Stories from Detective Comics #815–816; Batman: Shadow of the Bat #1–4; Batman: Batgirl (vol. 2) #1; Batman: Streets of Gotham #10–11; Detective Comics (vol. 2) #18; a short story from The Batman Chronicles #3; a never-before-published short story originally intended for Batman: Gotham Knights #12 and published here for the first time ever; a page from Rogues Gallery	January 2020	SC: 978-1-4012-9897-5
Batman: Arkham – Talia al Ghul	Stories from Detective Comics #411; Batman #232, 656; Batman: Son of the Demon; Batman: Death and the Maidens #9; Red Hood: The Lost Days #1; Batman and Robin #12; Batman, Incorporated (vol. 2) #2–13; Batman (vol. 3) #34–35; pages from Who's Who: The Definitive Directory of the DC Universe Volume XXIII, Who's Who in the DC Universe #16, Batman Villains Secret Files and Origins 2005 and President Luthor Secret Files and Origins #1	April 2021	SC: 978-1-77950-915-4
Batman: Allies
Batman: Allies – Alfred Pennyworth	Stories from Batman #16, 31, Annual #13, Annual (vol. 3) #1, 3; Detective Comics #83, 356, 501–502, 806–807; The Untold Legend of the Batman #2; Batman: Shadow of the Bat #31; Batman: Gotham Knights #42; Batman: Gotham Adventures #16; Batman Eternal #31	March 2020	SC: 978-1-4012-9894-4
Other Batman villain editions
Batman: Challenge of the Man-Bat	Stories from Detective Comics #395, 397, 400, 402, 407	June 1989	SC: 978-1-85286-141-4
Tales of the Man-Bat	Man-Bat (vol. 2) #1–3; a story from Showcase '94 #11; Man-Bat (vol. 3) #1–5	March 2018	SC: 978-1-4012-7541-9
Man-Bat	Man-Bat (vol. 4) #1–5	November 2021	SC: 978-1-77950-659-7
Batman: Tales of the Demon	Stories from Batman #232, 235, 240, 242–244; Detective Comics #411, 485, 489–490; DC Special Series #15	February 1998	SC: 978-0-930289-94-2
Batman: The Demon Trilogy	Batman: Son of the Demon; Batman: Bride of the Demon; Batman: Birth of the Demon	September 2020	HC: 978-1-77950-450-0
Batman: Anarky	Stories from Detective Comics #608–609; Batman: Shadow of the Bat #40–41; Anarky #1–4; a short story from The Batman Chronicles #1	February 1999	SC: 978-1-56389-437-4
Batman: Scarecrow Tales	Stories from World's Finest Comics #3; Batman #189, 262; The Joker #8; Detective Comics #503, 571; New Year's Evil: Scarecrow #1; a short story from Batman: Gotham Knights #23	January 2005; May 2005	HC: 978-1-4156-1256-9; SC: 978-1-4012-0443-3
Batman: Harley Quinn	Stories from Batman: Harley Quinn; Detective Comics #831, 837; Joker's Asylum II: Harley Quinn #1; Legends of the Dark Knight 100-Page Super Spectacular #1; Detective Comics (vol. 2) #23.2; short stories from Batman Black and White #1, 3 and Batman: Gotham Knights #14, 30	July 2015	SC: 978-1-4012-5517-6
The Joker: His Greatest Jokes	Stories from Batman #8, 67, 145, 260, 353, 366; Detective Comics #388, 833–834; The Spectre (vol. 3) #51; Batman: Prelude to the Wedding - Harley Quinn vs. the Joker #1	August 2019	SC: 978-1-4012-9441-0
Batman vs. the Joker: Barnes & Noble Exclusive Edition	Stories from Batman #251, 429, 614; Batman (vol. 2) #40; Detective Comics #475–476; Batman: Europa #1 A Barnes & Noble exclusive publication.	September 2019	SC: 978-1-77950-144-8
Celebration editions
Batman: A Celebration of 75 Years	Stories from Detective Comics #27, 83, 211, 216, 327, 359, 395, 442, 474, 574, 633, 711, 757, 821; Batman #1, 49, 181, 497; Batman (vol. 2) #2; World's Finest Comics #94; DC Special Series #21; Batman Special #1	July 2014	HC: 978-1-4012-4758-4
The Joker: A Celebration of 75 Years	Stories from Batman #1, 5, 25, 32, 85, 163, 251, 427; Batman (vol. 2) #15; Detective Comics #64, 168, 180, 475–476, 726, 741, 826; Detective Comics (vol. 2) #1; World's Finest Comics #61; Superman (vol. 2) #9; Batman: Legends of the Dark Knight #66	July 2014	HC: 978-1-4012-4759-1
Robin the Boy Wonder: A Celebration of 75 Years	Stories from Detective Comics #38, 342; Batman #20, 107, 156, 408, 428, 442, 657; Star-Spangled Comics #82, 86, 103; Batman Family #1; Nightwing #25, 101; Superman/Batman #7, 77; Batman and Robin Annual #1; Justice League of America #55; DC One Million 80-Page Giant #1,000,000	May 2015	HC: 978-1-4012-5536-7
Catwoman: A Celebration of 75 Years	Stories from Batman #1, 3, 65, 69, 323–324; Superman's Girl Friend Lois Lane #70–71; Wonder Woman #201–202; DC Super Stars #17; The Brave and the Bold #197; Catwoman #1; Catwoman (vol. 2) #28; Catwoman (vol. 3) #20, 52; Catwoman (vol. 4) #35; Gotham City Sirens #1; Batman: Gotham Adventures #4; a story from Solo #1; a short story from Batman '66 #5	November 2015	HC: 978-1-4012-6006-4
Batgirl: A Celebration of 50 Years	Stories from Detective Comics #359, 371, 422–424, 518–519; Batman #139; Batman: Legends of the Dark Knight #120; Batman Family #9; Batgirl Special #1; Birds of Prey #8; Batgirl #8, 45; Batgirl (vol. 3) #4, 13; Batgirl (vol. 4) #0, 35; a short story from The Batman Chronicles #5	February 2017	HC: 978-1-4012-6816-9
Harley Quinn: A Celebration of 25 Years	Stories from The Batman Adventures #3, 16, Annual #1; The Batman Adventures Holiday Special #1; The Batgirl Adventures #1; Harley and Ivy: Love on the Lam; Batman: Harley Quinn; Harley Quinn #1, 25; Harley Quinn (vol. 2) #2; Batman #613; Joker's Asylum II: Harley Quinn #1; Harley's Little Black Book #1; Suicide Squad (vol. 3) #6–7; Suicide Squad (vol. 4) #4	August 2017	HC: 978-1-4012-7599-0
Two-Face: A Celebration of 75 Years	Stories from Detective Comics #66, 68, 80, 739; Batman #50, 81, 234, 410–411, 572, Annual #14; The Brave and the Bold #106; The Joker #1; Gotham Central #10; Joker's Asylum: Two-Face #1; Batman and Robin (vol. 2) #23.1; a story from Secret Origins Special #1; a short story from Batman Black and White #1	November 2017	HC: 978-1-4012-7438-2
Elseworlds editions
Batman: Thrillkiller	Batgirl and Robin: Thrillkiller #1–3; Batgirl and Batman: Thrillkiller '62	October 1998; June 2018	First SC: 978-1-56389-424-4; Second SC: 978-1-4012-8074-1
Tales of the Multiverse – Batman: Vampire	Batman & Dracula: Red Rain; Batman: Bloodstorm; Batman: Crimson Mist	December 2007	SC: 978-1-4012-1565-1
Elseworlds: Batman Vol. One	Batman: Holy Terror; Batman: The Blue, the Grey, and the Bat; Robin 3000 #1–2; Batman/Dark Joker: The Wild; Batman/Houdini: The Devil's Workshop; Batman: Castle of the Bat; Batman: In Darkest Knight; Batman: Dark Allegiances	April 2016	SC: 978-1-4012-6074-3
Elseworlds: Batman Vol. Two	Batman & Dracula: Red Rain; Batman: Bloodstorm; Batman: Crimson Mist	October 2016	SC: 978-1-4012-6982-1
Elseworlds: Batman Vol. Three	Batman: KnightGallery; Batman: Brotherhood of the Bat; Batman: Dark Knight of the Round Table #1–2; Batman: Scar of the Bat; Batman: Masque	June 2018	SC: 978-1-56389-424-4
Other anthology editions
Batman with Robin the Boy Wonder; From The 30's To The 70's	Stories from Detective Comics #27, 29, 38, 40, 140, 168, 205, 233, 359, 395, 402; Batman #1, 16, 67, 68, 77, 81, 86, 92, 105, 131, 139, 144, 153, 217, 227; World's Finest Comics #88, 113; plus extras	October 1971	HC: 978-0-685-92060-2

=== Batman Beyond collections ===
Title	Material collected	Publication date	ISBN
Batman Beyond
Batman Beyond	Batman Beyond #1–6	March 2000	978-1-56389-604-0
Batman Beyond (vol. 3)
Batman Beyond: Hush Beyond	Batman Beyond (vol. 3) #1–6	March 2011	978-1-4012-2988-7
Batman Beyond (vol. 4)
Batman Beyond: Industrial Revolution	Batman Beyond (vol. 4) #1–8	January 2012	978-1-4012-3374-7
Batman Beyond Unlimited
Superman Beyond: Man of Tomorrow	Superman Beyond #0, Superman/Batman Annual #4 and Superman Beyond stories from Batman Beyond Unlimited #1–10 (Superman Beyond digital chapters #1–10)	April 2013	978-1-4012-3823-0
Justice League Beyond: Konstriction	Justice League Beyond stories from Batman Beyond Unlimited #1–10 (Justice League Beyond digital chapters #1–16)	May 2013	978-1-4012-4023-3
Batman Beyond: 10,000 Clowns	Batman Beyond stories from Batman Beyond Unlimited #1–13 (Batman Beyond digital chapters #1–16)	May 2013	978-1-4012-4034-9
Justice League Beyond: In Gods We Trust	Justice League Beyond and Superman Beyond stories from Batman Beyond Unlimited #10-17 (Justice League Beyond digital chapters #17–25 and Superman Beyond digital chapters #11–20)	March 2014	978-1-4012-4754-6
Batman Beyond: Batgirl Beyond	Batman Beyond stories from Batman Beyond Unlimited #11–18 (Batman Beyond digital chapters #17-29) and Batman Beyond (vol. 2) #1–2	April 2014	978-1-4012-4753-9
Batman Beyond 2.0 / Batman Beyond Universe
Justice League Beyond 2.0: Power Struggle	Justice League Beyond stories from Batman Beyond Universe #1–8 (Justice League Beyond 2.0 digital chapters #1–16)	October 2014	978-1-4012-5073-7
Batman Beyond 2.0 Vol. 1: Rewired	Batman Beyond stories from Batman Beyond Universe #1–8 (Batman Beyond 2.0 digital chapters #1–16)	November 2014	978-1-4012-5060-7
Batman Beyond 2.0 Vol. 2: Justice Lords Beyond	Batman Beyond and Justice League Beyond stories from Batman Beyond Universe #9–12 (Batman Beyond 2.0 digital chapters #17-24 and Justice League Beyond 2.0 digital chapters #17-24)	March 2015	978-1-4012-5464-3
Batman Beyond 2.0 Vol. 3: Mark of the Phantasm	Batman Beyond stories from Batman Beyond Universe #13–16 (Batman Beyond 2.0 digital chapters #25-40)	September 2015	978-1-4012-5801-6
Batman Beyond (vol. 5)
Batman Beyond: Brave New Worlds	Batman Beyond (vol. 5) #1–6	March 2016	978-1-4012-6191-7
Batman Beyond: City of Yesterday	Batman Beyond (vol. 5) #7–11	October 2016	978-1-4012-6470-3
Batman Beyond: Wired for Death	Batman Beyond (vol. 5) #12–16; Batman Beyond: Rebirth #1	February 2017	978-1-4012-7039-1
Batman Beyond (vol. 6) (DC Rebirth)
Batman Beyond Vol. 1: Escaping the Grave	Batman Beyond: Rebirth #1; Batman Beyond (vol. 6) #1–5	July 2017	978-1-4012-7103-9
Batman Beyond Vol. 2: Rise of the Demon	Batman Beyond (vol. 6) #6–12	January 2018	978-1-4012-7522-8
Batman Beyond Vol. 3: The Long Payback	Batman Beyond (vol. 6) #13–19	August 2018	978-1-4012-8036-9
Batman Beyond Vol. 4: Target: Batman	Batman Beyond (vol. 6) #20–24	January 2019	978-1-4012-8563-0
Batman Beyond Vol. 5: The Final Joke	Batman Beyond (vol. 6) #25–30	July 2019	978-1-4012-9208-9
Batman Beyond Vol. 6: Divide, Conquer, and Kill	Batman Beyond (vol. 6) #31–36	February 2020	978-1-4012-9547-9
Batman Beyond Vol. 7: First Flight	Batman Beyond (vol. 6) #37–42	July 2020	978-1-77950-287-2
Batman Beyond Vol. 8: The Eradication Agenda	Batman Beyond (vol. 6) #43–50	March 2021	978-1-77950-573-6
Batman Beyond: Neo Year
Batman Beyond: Neo Year	Batman Beyond: Neo Year #1–6	January 2023	978-1-77951-756-2

=== Batman animated TV series collections ===
Title	Material collected	Publication date	ISBN
The Batman Adventures first editions
The Batman Adventures	The Batman Adventures #1–6	December 1993	SC: 978-1-56389-098-7
The Dark Knight Adventures	The Batman Adventures #7–12	June 1994	SC: 978-1-56389-124-3
The Batman Adventures: The Lost Years	The Batman Adventures: The Lost Years #1–5	February 1999	SC: 978-1-56389-483-1
Batman: The Gotham Adventures	Batman: Gotham Adventures #1–6	June 2000	SC: 978-1-56389-616-3
The Batman Adventures: Dangerous Dames and Demons	The Batman Adventures Annual #1–2; The Batman Adventures: Mad Love; Adventures in the DC Universe #3	June 2003	SC: 978-1-56389-973-7
Batman: Harley and Ivy	Batman: Harley and Ivy #1–3; Harley and Ivy: Love on the Lam; a colorized short story from Batman: Gotham Knights #14	July 2007	SC: 978-1-4012-1333-6
Batman: Mad Love and Other Stories	The Batman Adventures: Mad Love; The Batman Adventures Annual #1–2; stories from The Batman Adventures Holiday Special #1 and Adventures in the DC Universe #3; a short story from Batman Black and White #1	March 2009; September 2011	HC: 978-1-4012-1333-6 SC: 978-1-4012-3115-6
Batman: His Greatest Adventures	The Batman Adventures #3, 11, 19; Batman & Robin Adventures #4; Batman Beyond #1; The Batman Strikes! #6	September 2017	SC: 978-1-4012-7693-5
Batman/Teenage Mutant Ninja Turtles Adventures	Batman/Teenage Mutant Ninja Turtles Adventures #1–6	August 2018	978-1-4012-8031-4
Batman and Harley Quinn	Batman and Harley Quinn chapters #1–7; Harley Quinn and Batman chapters #1–5	March 2019	SC: 978-1-4012-8899-0
Batman Adventures: Batgirl – A League of Her Own	The Batgirl Adventures #1; Batman: Gotham Adventures #8–9, 22, 38	August 2020	SC: 978-1-77950-671-9
Batman Adventures: Cat Got Your Tongue?	Adventures in the DC Universe #2, #19; Batman: Gotham Adventures #4, #24, #50; Batman Adventures #10	August 2021	SC: 978-1-77951-080-8
Batman Adventures: Nightwing Rising	The Batman Adventures: The Lost Years #1–5; Batman: Gotham Adventures #1	October 2020	SC: 978-1-77950-722-8
Batman Adventures: Robin, the Boy Wonder	Batman: Gotham Adventures #7, 19, 29, 42, 54; The Batman Adventures (vol. 2) #9	January 2021	SC: 978-1-77950-723-5
The Batman Adventures digest-sized editions
Batman Adventures: Rogues Gallery	The Batman Adventures #1–4; Batman: Gotham Adventures #50	July 2004	Digest size: 978-1-4012-0329-0
Batman Adventures: Shadows and Masks	The Batman Adventures #5–9	July 2004	Digest size: 978-1-4012-0330-6
The Batman Strikes!
The Batman Strikes! Vol. 1: Crime Time	The Batman Strikes! #1–5	June 2005	SC: 978-1-4012-0509-6
The Batman Strikes! Vol. 2: In Darkest Knight	The Batman Strikes! #6–10	September 2005	SC: 978-1-4012-0510-2
The Batman Strikes! Vol. 3: Duty Calls	The Batman Strikes! #11–14, 16–18	September 2007	SC: 978-1-4012-1548-4
Beware the Batman
Beware the Batman Vol. 1	Beware the Batman #1–6 and a special Free Comic Book Day comic book issue	January 2015	SC: 978-1-4012-4936-6
The Batman Adventures revised editions
The Batman Adventures Vol. 1	The Batman Adventures #1–10	November 2014	SC: 978-1-4012-5229-8
The Batman Adventures Vol. 2	The Batman Adventures #11–20	May 2015	SC: 978-1-4012-5463-6
The Batman Adventures Vol. 3	The Batman Adventures #21–27, Annual #1	November 2015	SC: 978-1-4012-5872-6
The Batman Adventures Vol. 4	The Batman Adventures #28–35, Annual #2; The Batman Adventures Holiday Special #1	May 2016	SC: 978-1-4012-6061-3
The Batman Adventures Omnibus	The Batman Adventures (1992) #28-36, Annual #2, The Batman Adventures Holiday Special #1	April 2016	978-1-77952-119-4
Batman & Robin Adventures Vol. 1	Batman & Robin Adventures #1–10	December 2016	SC: 978-1-4012-6783-4
Batman & Robin Adventures Vol. 2	Batman & Robin Adventures #11–18, Annual #1	December 2017	SC: 978-1-4012-7405-4
Batman & Robin Adventures Vol. 3	Batman & Robin Adventures #19–25, Annual #2	July 2018	SC: 978-1-4012-8138-0

== See also ==
- Publication history of Batman
- List of Spider-Man titles
- List of Superman comics
- Publication history of Anarky
- Publication history of Dick Grayson
- Publication history of Superman
- Publication history of Wonder Woman
