= Batman: Beyond the White Knight =

Limited comic book series by Sean Murphy

- Cover of Batman: Beyond the White Knight #1 (March 2022)

Publication information
- Publisher: DC Comics (Black Label)
- Schedule: Monthly
- Format: Limited series
- Genre: Cyberpunk; Science fiction Superhero
- Publication date: March 29, 2022 — February 14, 2023
- No. of issues: 8
- Main character(s): Batman; Terry McGinnis; Joker; Harley Quinn; Barbara Gordon; Nightwing; Red Hood; Robin; Blight

Creative team
- Written by: Sean Murphy
- Artist: Sean Murphy
- Letterer: AndWorld Design
- Colorist: Dave Stewart

Batman: Beyond the White Knight is an American comic book published by DC Comics under its Black Label imprint. The eight-issue limited series — written and illustrated by Sean Murphy, lettered by AndWorld Design and colored by Dave Stewart — began its monthly publication on March 29, 2022, and ended on February 14, 2023. It is the sequel to both Batman: White Knight (2017–18) and Batman: Curse of the White Knight (2019–20), and is also the fifth installment in Murphy's self-titled Murphyverse line. It is also an adaptation of the animated television series Batman Beyond (1999–2001), with the plot of the comic book being based on the original premise of the series.

Batman: Beyond the White Knight takes place 12 years after the events of the previous volume Curse of the White Knight, which ended with Bruce Wayne exposed as Batman to the general public and donating his entire fortune to the people of Gotham City, and then turning himself in to the police. Since then, the city has evolved into a futuristic megalopolis known as "Neo-Gotham". Following the murder of his father Warren, young Terry McGinnis — under the orders of his employer Derek Powers — steals a technologically advanced Batsuit to become the new Batman and avenge his father's death. At the same time, a middle-aged Bruce escapes from prison in an attempt to rid Neo-Gotham of Batman for good, all while a civil war slowly rages through the city and Powers transforms into the supervillain Blight.

Beyond the White Knight received critical acclaim from critics and readers alike, with praise for the comic's plot, dialogue and dynamics between characters, art style, and faithfulness to the source material. A two-issue limited series titled Batman: White Knight Presents: Red Hood — which serves as a prequel to Beyond the White Knight — began publication on August 2, 2022, and ended on the 23rd of the same month. A six-issue limited series titled Batman: White Knight Presents: Generation Joker — which serves as a follow-up to Beyond the White Knight — began publication in May 2023.

== Synopsis ==
=== Setting ===
Batman: Beyond the White Knight occurs 12 years after the defeat of terrorist Jean-Paul Valley — also known as Azrael — at the hands of wealthy industrialist Bruce Wayne. (Note: As depicted in Batman: Curse of the White Knight (2019–20).) Shortly before the latter surrenders to police custody after exposing his secret identity as the vigilante Batman to the public, Bruce voluntarily gives his fortune to the people of Gotham City by infusing the money into the city's budget, then dissolves and transforms his own company Wayne Enterprises into various nonprofit organizations, all with the aim of helping to renew the city and help the less fortunate. Bruce's actions, however, inadvertently led to him being put on trial after his former employee Derek Powers filed a lawsuit against him, which allowed Powers to successfully acquire all of the Wayne family's assets; This, in turn, permitted Powers to prevent the dissolution of Wayne Enterprises and become its new CEO, thereby rebranding the company as Wayne-Powers Enterprises and preventing any of the charitable organizations Bruce created from having any effect on the city.

Over the past 12 years, Powers has used much of Gotham's budget intended to help the city to instead fund the paramilitary police group known as the Gotham Terrorist Oppression Unit (GTO) — led by Commander Dick Grayson, Bruce's second adopted son and former crime-fighting partner Nightwing — providing it with a vast array of high-tech weapons and equipment such as armored uniforms and specialized combat vehicles, all stylized in the likeness of Batman. Although the GTO overconsumes Gotham's budget, a portion of the money was still used to tremendously evolve the city into a technologically advanced megalopolis that is currently known as "Neo-Gotham", which has become a GTO-controlled police state that is heavily monitored by surveillance cameras and where crime is virtually non-existent, although tax rates on homelessness, suicides and depression have increased. As a result, the once-vigilante Batgirl-turned-Commissioner Barbara Gordon and the Gotham City Police Department (GCPD) have severed ties with the GTO and are staunchly opposed to it, with tensions between the two parties slowly building into a civil war in Neo-Gotham. In addition, Bruce continues to serve time at Stonegate Penitentiary, being closely watched by Captain Jason Todd, Bruce's first adopted son and former sidekick Robin, who currently operates as the brutal vigilante Red Hood.

=== Plot ===
High school student Terry McGinnis is sent by his employer Powers to steal the Beyond suit — a "special" Batsuit created by Bruce years earlier when he was still Batman, but which he never got to wear because it was considered too dangerous — from a historic site where the ruins of Wayne Manor and the Batcave are located. Terry is soon discovered by the site guards and, to avoid getting caught, he dons the Beyond suit, allowing him to beat down the guards and flee the scene. At Stonegate, Bruce prevents Jason from being killed by a cult-like gang dedicated to the now-deceased Valley called the Sons of Azrael in the midst of a riot, which is forcibly stopped with the arrival of the GTO. While escorting him back to his cell, GTO officer Duke Thomas shows Bruce footage of Terry wearing the Beyond suit he stole, and Bruce deduces that Powers is the one behind the robbery. Meanwhile, after a fierce argument with her daughter Jackie Quinzel, reformed criminal and retired vigilante Harley Quinn discovers that she has run away from home and finds in Jackie's room classified documents regarding Harley's murder of the psychotic criminal known as the Joker. Back at Stonegate, Bruce reconciles with Jason before breaking out of prison to put an end to Powers' plans. Upon arriving in Neo-Gotham, Bruce comes across a seemingly resurrected Joker.

A month earlier, Dick and the GTO witness how Terry beats up the criminal known as Mr. Fixx for allegedly murdering Warren McGinnis, Terry's father and Powers' former employee and best friend. Dick then intervenes on Terry's behalf and, rather than taking him into custody, introduces him to Powers, who reveals to Terry that Fixx was hired to kill Warren. Learning of this fact, Terry agrees to work for Powers in exchange for his help in locating and exacting revenge on those responsible for Warren's death. In the present, the Joker in front of Bruce informs him that he is actually a consciousness-based A.I. of the real Joker's sane alter ego Jack Napier — Harley's late husband and father to Jackie and her twin brother Bryce Quinzel. The A.I., calling himself "Jack" and appearing to Bruce as a hologram only he can see, explains to him that he is being projected from a microchip inside Bruce's head that was previously inserted by the original Napier following Bruce's first apprehension by the GTO. (Note: As depicted in Batman: White Knight (2017–18).) At the GTO headquarters, Duke quits his job upon refusing to obey Dick's order to arrest Jason for letting Bruce escape. While wandering around Neo-Gotham, Bruce is confronted by Dick, who he manages to defeat and immobilize with Jack's help. Realizing that he lacks resources, Bruce sneaks into an old safe house of his to equip himself, but is approached by Harley, who has been given the house by him as a dwelling for her and her children. (Note: As depicted in Batman: White Knight Presents: Harley Quinn (2020–21).) Much to Jack's confusion, Harley confesses to being married to Bruce.

Powers sends Terry to infiltrate several facilities around Neo-Gotham to steal various pieces of technology that Powers believes will help fix the malfunctioning Beyond suit, which he plans to use in a secret project he is working on. Powers later tells Terry that Bruce is the one who hired Fixx to kill Warren. At Harley's house, she explains that Powers was going to force her to testify against Bruce in the trial 12 years earlier, and that she married Bruce only because marital privileges would prevent that from happening while also revealing that her daughter is missing, most likely due to Derek Powers kidnapping her. Duke tries to rejoin the GCPD, but is turned down by Barbara, who instead gives him a Robin suit and requests that, as a vigilante, he assist Bruce in taking down Powers. Wearing a modified Batsuit, Bruce reveals to Napier that Powers had in the past deduced that his secret identity was Batman, but instead of revealing it publicly, Powers proposed that as long as Bruce continued to fund him, he would not only not reveal Bruce's identity, but also develop equipment to use in his crusade; albeit reluctantly, Bruce accepted Powers' proposal. Attempting to infiltrate the GCPD, Bruce encounters Terry, who — dressed as Batman — overpowers Bruce and tries to question him about his alleged role in Warren's death, but Duke appears as Robin to aid Bruce in fighting Terry, with the ensuing conflict between the three of them causing Bruce to fall off the roof where the fight was taking place and land on top of a car.

Jackie Quinzel is attacked by Azrael's gang, but is saved by Dick Grayson and takes her to Powers who wants her to help him find Bruce. Terry meets up with Powers and tells him that Bruce escaped with the help of Barbara Gordon and Duke Thomas. Barbara convinces Bruce to try to reason with Dick after revealing she and Dick had a child five years ago. Powers tells Terry that he is making him steal things so that Powers can create a militarized army based on Batman and shows Terry a video showing that Earth will soon be attacked. While sneaking in GTO, Duke is confronted by Dick and defeats him. While meeting with his mother, Terry recalls how his father would always distance himself from the family, and had a falling out with his father on the day he died, but not before Terry's dad telling him that Powers is insane and someone needs to stop him. Bruce and Napier meet a stray hound and call him Ace and restart a flying Batmobile.

Barbara calls Bruce and tells him that Warren McGinnis and Powers had a falling out, and they were working on a secret project. Bruce tries opening up a secret file after sneaking into Powers' building, but Jackie finds out. Batman manages to convince Jackie to stand down by telling her that her father (when he was Napier) was a good man, and Harley had to kill him to prevent Joker from coming out. Batman is attacked by the GTO and while trying to escape he meets Terry and Powers. Batman deduces Terry's identity and convinces him that Powers is bad, which causes Terry to cause an explosion. Bruce has a panic attack, so Napier takes over Bruce's body and escapes. They meet with Harley, where Napier (in Bruce's body) confesses his feelings to her.

The next morning, Bruce wakes up but Harley reassures Bruce that they did not have sex and she knew that Napier was controlling his body. Bruce tries to suppress his feelings from Harley, but Harley tells him that the reason he is having these panic attacks is because Bruce considers Batman his identity, and if he is afraid, then he is no longer Batman and is alone with nothing. Bruce talks to Napier, and make amends with him and Harley. Dick confronts Jason Todd, and they have a brawl in the middle of the street, which ends with Dick sending Jason to the Gotham City Police. Bruce meets with Dick who tells him that Powers is creating new weapons and had Terry's father killed when Warren threatened to go to the FBI. Bruce finally makes amends with Dick, and saves Dick when he is attacked by Powers and GTO after finding out Jackie knows the truth about Powers killing Terry's father. While Bruce is distracted, Dick jumps in front of a blast from Powers who turned into Blight.

Batman remembers how he recruited Dick, while Terry confronts Powers about the truth, but Powers takes control of Terry's suit. Powers forces Terry to fight Bruce, and Terry brutally beats Bruce to the brink of death. Duke, Red Hood, and Barbara help out Bruce, and Napier tells Bruce to wire Terry's suit to the Batmobile where he frees Terry but as a result everyone can see Napier. Bruce allows Terry to keep the Batsuit, and decides to lead an assault on Powers. During the assault, Powers activates the Bat Mechs and nearly kills Bruce's allies, and Bruce has another panic attack, but Harley helps him overcome it and Bruce becomes Batman once more. Powers nearly takes control of Terry's suit, but Napier double crosses him and Terry decides not to kill Powers. Napier saves his daughter, but in the process his programming is seemingly destroyed. After Powers is arrested, FBI agents Diana Prince and John Stewart arrive and tell Batman that Derek Powers fears an invasion due to the arrival of a powered teenager from Kansas.

== Production ==
=== Development ===
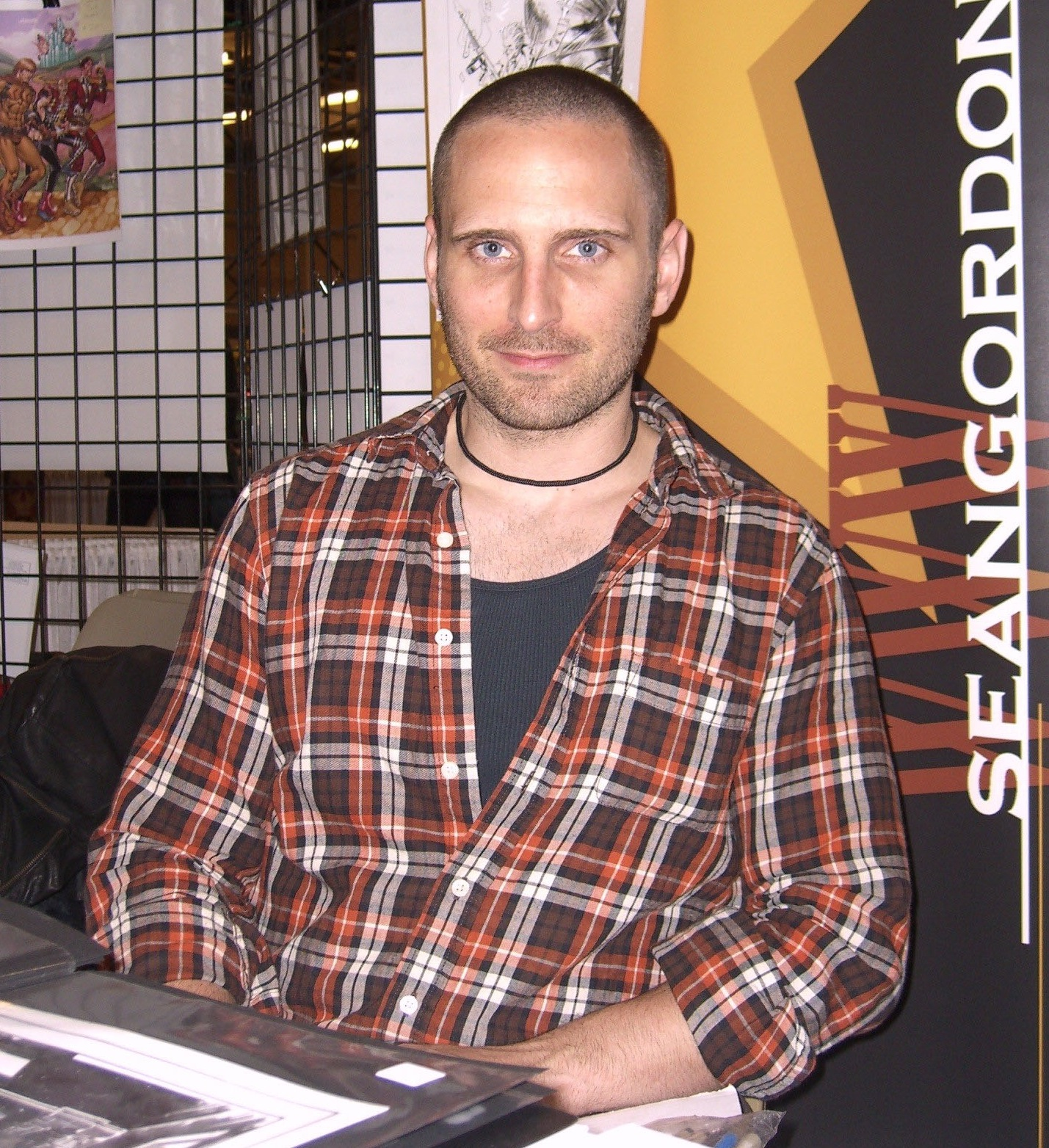
Sean Murphy, the writer and illustrator of Batman: Beyond the White Knight.

In late November 2018, while working on the limited series Batman: Curse of the White Knight (2019–20), the sequel to Batman: White Knight (2017–18), comic book writer Sean Murphy revealed in an interview with DC Daily that he planned to introduce Terry McGinnis — the successor to Bruce Wayne as Batman in the animated television series Batman Beyond (1999–2001) — to the Murphyverse, the comic book line overseen by Murphy himself. On the subject of presenting his own depiction of Batman Beyond in the White Knight series, Murphy said: "I'd like to eventually bridge the entire thing series into Batman Beyond. I'm not sure what I'm gonna do with it or how I'm gonna introduce Terry, but I have an idea that will explain why Gotham [City] looks so gothic and Batman Beyond looks so futuristic, and how did this city change so fast. I think I have a way to explain that". Later interviews with The Hollywood Reporter and JoBlo.com would reinforce the above statement concerning the creation of a sequel to Batman: White Knight and Curse of the White Knight based on Batman Beyond. A new installment in the Murphyverse titled Batman: Beyond the White Knight was confirmed by Murphy in early December 2019.

=== Writing ===
In an interview with Comic Book Resources and ComicBook.com about bringing a distinct version of Terry to Beyond the White Knight, Murphy emphasized how important it was to him that the character be "unique, but sort of familiar at the same time", with part of his approach to him revolving around introducing Terry as an antagonist at the beginning of the story. Likewise, he simplified that Terry is not an evil person, just someone traumatized by the loss of his father Warren McGinnis and who is looking for a replacement role model in his life. In this way, Murphy hoped to explore Terry's complex nature and establish an engaging dynamic between him and Bruce, the latter who, in Murphy's words, "ages like a fine wine". Additionally, Terry is depicted as being multiracial (partly of Asian and Irish descent) in this book; this was a creative shift the author made to the character's ethnicity, something that was never addressed or specified by the production team of the original TV show, with many of its viewers assuming Terry was Asian for his physical appearance and Irish for his last name, a fact that Murphy was not initially aware of when he decided to diversify the character.

Murphy described Beyond the White Knight as a "sci-fi thriller", with its predecessors being a political thriller (Batman: White Knight) and a historical thriller (Batman: Curse of the White Knight), respectively. The main antagonist of this volume is a businessman Derek Powers, who works with criminal groups such as the Jokerz and the Royal Flush Gang. Murphy chose Powers due to his own belief that he is "the only logical choice of villain for a Batman Beyond-inspired sequel", and teased that—like the TV series—the book would include Powers' transformation into Blight, a form that has been described as a "glowing skeleton man". To turn Powers into a more empathetic character, Murphy added to him a compelling backstory involving Victor Fries / Mr. Freeze and Thomas Wayne, as well as "a personal grudge between [Powers] and Batman". Later, when asked why he prefers to write about complicated, redeemable antagonists for his stories, Murphy affirmed that it is his own interest in detailing the complexities of each villain that motivates him to portray them as sympathetic characters, regardless of whether the audience is rooting for them or not. He also mentioned that Beyond the White Knight has a comedic element that none of the other books in the White Knight series have.

A major element in the series' plot is the evolution of Gotham City that went from "a grungy urban hellscape into the futuristic Neo-Gotham" in a time gap of twelve years between Curse and Beyond the White Knight. Murphy explained that the city went through rapid transformation due to Bruce giving away a fortune at the end of the second volume. The character Duke Thomas adopts the mantle of Robin in Beyond the White Knight, an idea that Murphy originally attempted to include in earlier volumes of the White Knight series, but was unable to carry out beforehand in part due to his staff's massive discouragement, which arose due to the belief that the character would not look well dressed in a Robin costume; Murphy assured them that Duke would look "cool" like a Mortal Kombat character. The comic also features the appearance of characters such as Bruce's pet dog Ace the Bat-Hound, and the criminal Mr. Fixx.

=== Design ===
For the overall look of Terry McGinnis' Beyond Batsuit, Murphy decided not to make any noteworthy changes to its usual black and red design.

To illustrate Terry in the Beyond Batsuit in a way dissimilar to what most artists have done with the character, Murphy used different inking techniques — focusing more on texture than detail — to give the character a unique guise so he would never look twice the same as Batman. Moreover, Murphy likened Terry's black and red Batsuit to the blue and red costume belonging to the Marvel Comics character Spider-Man; he did not want to make any significant changes to the former's design, opining that this particular Batsuit is "so perfect the way it was originally conceived that it's hard to really add stuff to it without mucking it up". Alternatively, Murphy opted to incorporate simple yet small details into the Beyond suit, such as red vents at the elbows, knees and around the chest, for example. As for middle-aged Bruce's Batsuit, Murphy designed a makeshift costume for the character, replacing the cape with a hooded trench coat, spray painting over the bat symbol on the chest, and ditching the cowl, with Murphy arguing that there's no need to hide Bruce's face, as everyone in the book knows he was Batman. Murphy also designed the Batsuit-like uniforms of the GTO members to look like "overbearing RoboCops" to contrast those of the Gotham City Police Department officers, who in the story represent the blue-collar cops as opposed to the "worst version of a police department" that is the GTO.

Regarding Neo-Gotham's design, which he integrated with elements of Batman Beyond, Murphy conceded that evolving the book's scenario — from the "gothic, jaded streets of Gotham" of the previous volumes to a "neo-noir nightmare of a not-so-distant utopia" — has been one of the funniest aspects of creating Batman: Beyond the White Knight for him, and said that he was happy to be working on a sci-fi genre again after his work on Tokyo Ghost (2015–16). Murphy's desire for Neo-Gotham was to give it a distinct presence, focusing on the roads and highways like veins that enter and leave the city from all directions, and also making sure not to keep Neo-Gotham too clean with elements of future architecture so it would not look like a nighttime equivalent of Metropolis. Ultimately, Murphy analogized Beyond the White Knight to the Blade Runner franchise, the primary point of comparison being the futuristic setting that both works share, with him asserting that he wanted to design a Blade Runner-like city in Neo-Gotham.

For Batman Beyond's flying Batmobile, Murphy tried to envision it as a strange spaceship while at the same time still trying to think of it as a car, which was a complicated and unusual process for him as this Batmobile had no wheels and he is used to designing cars with wheels, which is where a car comes to life in his opinion. To help him reshape the vehicle, Murphy made a model out of cardboard, paper, glue and paint, unsuccessfully trying to base the car's design on the one seen in the classic cartoon that, in his own words, "looks like two commas stuck together". Instead, he decided to give the Batmobile's appearance a personal touch, though he claims he did take some inspiration from the TV show. Several other iterations of the Batmobile from various Batman-related media make appearances throughout the series, including the version of the vehicle seen in the animated television show Batman: The Animated Series (1992–95), as well as those featured in the films Batman (1989) and Batman Returns (1992) by Tim Burton and The Batman (2022) by Matt Reeves.

=== Influences ===
As the title suggests, the original purpose of the series was to adapt the basic premise of Batman Beyond, with Murphy commenting that "this series is designed to check all the boxes of what readers love about Batman Beyond", although he decided not to make a straightforward retelling of the show's storyline, instead focusing on a different approach by reinventing it to establish the plot of Batman: Beyond the White Knight as something not only familiar, but unique in relation to the TV series. Aside from the TV series, Beyond the White Knight slightly differently adapts some plot elements from the animated film Batman Beyond: Return of the Joker (2000), such as the eponymous villain of the title having his consciousness transferred into a microchip. As inspiration for Beyond the White Knight, the author admitted that he took influences from Frank Miller's miniseries The Dark Knight Returns (1986) and several other Batman publications and storylines, not to cite the aforementioned Blade Runner, but also the Marvel character Spider-Man 2099 and the Japanese manga Ghost in the Shell (1989–91) by Masamune Shirow, among others.

== Publication ==
Batman: Beyond the White Knight was written and illustrated by Murphy, lettered by AndWorld Design, and colored by Dave Stewart, the latter who replaced Matt Hollingsworth as colorist; Hollingsworth colored the earlier volumes of the White Knight series. As the fifth installment in the Murphyverse line, it was published under DC Comics Black Label imprint. Beyond the White Knight was originally scheduled for release in 2021, but was pushed back to 2022, with the eight issues released by DC at monthly intervals, the first being published on March 29. Due to a printing error, the first issue of the comic book had to be reprinted for publication on May 3. A collected edition in prestige format titled Batman: Beyond the White Knight Showcase Edition, containing the first two issues of the series, was released on May 31 the same year. After releasing its fourth issue on June 28, Beyond the White Knight took a break in July and August before resuming publication on September 27 with its fifth issue. Batman: Beyond the White Knight ended its publication with the release of its eighth and final issue on February 14, 2023. A complete edition that collects all eight issues of Beyond the White Knight — along with the two issues of Batman: White Knight Presents: Red Hood — was released on June 13 the same year.

=== Issues ===
Issue	Title	Publication date	Ref.
#1	"Book One"	March 29, 2022	
#2	"Book Two"	April 26, 2022	
#3	"Book Three"	May 24, 2022	
#4	"Book Four"	June 28, 2022	
#5	"Book Five"	September 27, 2022	
#6	"Book Six"	October 25, 2022	
#7	"Book Seven"	December 27, 2022	
#8	"Book Eight"	February 14, 2023	

=== Collected editions ===
Title	Collected material	Format	Publication date	Ref.
Batman: Beyond the White Knight Showcase Edition	Batman: Beyond the White Knight #1–2	Prestige	May 31, 2022	
Batman: Beyond the White Knight	Batman: Beyond the White Knight #1–8 and Batman: White Knight Presents: Red Hood #1-2	Complete	June 13, 2023	

== Reception ==
=== Critical response ===
According to ComicBookRoundup.com, Batman: Beyond the White Knight received an average rating of 8.4 out of 10 based on 64 reviews.

Reviewing Beyond the White Knight, Sayantan Gayen of Comic Book Resources wrote: "Batman: Beyond the White Knight is a dialogue-focused, character-driven comic book that relies heavily on exposition, be it monologues or character interactions, to explain the timelapse. One of the most awaited titles this year, Batman: Beyond the White Knight knocks it out of the park with an enthralling start to what will surely be another blockbuster series". Later, Gayen noted how the series' story is divided into multiple narratives, each portraying a different dilemma for every character as they are used to slowly expose the comic's plot. Gayen then highlighted the design of both the Batsuits worn by Terry and Bruce, while also praising Murphy's art style and Stewart's coloring. Sergio Pereira of Comic Book Resources—while more critical of the series' narrative than Gayen—ultimately hailed Murphy's art style as the comic's main selling point, saying that "it's easy to get lost in the detail and grandeur of the scenery as the art leaps off the page and grabs the reader's eye".

In his review, Matthew Aguilar of ComicBook.com gave a rating of 5 out of 5, writing: "Batman: Beyond the White Knight captures your attention instantly with its eye-catching visuals, but it's the oh-so-human family dynamics at the center of it all that makes it so damn great. If you've been on the fence as to diving into the White Knight universe, this is the perfect place to start, and if you do you might find yourself jumping all the way in. Trust me, you won't regret it, and I can't wait to see where things go from here". Aguilar also declared that the series lives up to his high expectations, being one of his favorite DC stories. Ray Goldfield of GeekDad gave a score of 8 out of 10, calling it a "full-on noir reinvention of the classic cartoon", although he was unsure whether this genre suited the style of the animated series. Goldfield however still found the comic book intriguing despite its fast-paced tone and what the reviewer believed were predictable cliffhangers, though he also admitted to feeling a certain skepticism as the book progressed. In addition, Goldfield commented that while the comic—in his opinion—was nearly indistinguishable from the original Batman Beyond animated series, the former was able to differentiate itself from the latter by presenting some "unique twists" in the mythology originally pertaining to the TV show.

=== Thematic analysis ===
Joshua Lapin-Bertone of DC Comics.com linked Beyond the White Knight to the proverbial phrase "Clothes don't make the man" when stating that the comic book reflected the general belief that a person should not be solemnly judged by their appearance; Lapin-Bertone argued that Murphy, to fully embody this idea in the comic, utilized the characters' shadows to demonstrate that the way they dress contradicts who they really are. For example, Bruce Wayne, despite having abandoned his vigilante identity for over twelve years in the book, still "embodies Batman in everything he does", with the shape of his shadow corroborating the popular hypothesis of Batman being the character's true self. Additionally, with Terry McGinnis in possession of a dangerously powerful Batsuit in the book, Lapin-Bertone questioned whether just wearing the suit makes one Batman or not, while also wondering what kind of shadow Terry would cast by the end of the series.

== Future ==
=== Sequel ===
In 2021, Murphy stated that he has "at least" one sequel planned for Batman: Beyond the White Knight. The eighth and final issue of Batman: Beyond the White Knight serves as the set-up for a Justice League-centric comic book titled World's Finest: White Knight.

=== Spin-offs ===
A two-issue prequel limited series titled Batman: White Knight Presents: Red Hood — co-written by Murphy and Clay McCormack, illustrated by Simone Di Meo and George Kambadais, and colored by Stewart — began publication on August 2, 2022, and ended on the 23rd of the same month. Taking place between the fourth and fifth issues of Beyond the White Knight, Red Hood focuses on Jason Todd and explains how he adopted the new moniker, as well as introduces a new ally to Jason, a young Mongolian girl named Gan who has her own Robin costume.

A six-issue limited series titled Batman: White Knight Presents: Generation Joker — written by Katana Collins, McCormack and Murphy, illustrated by Mirka Andolfo and colored by Alejandro Sánchez — serves as a follow-up to Beyond the White Knight, with its publication beginning on May 9, 2023. Taking place after the events of Beyond the White Knight, Generation Joker focuses on Harley Quinn's twin children, Bryce and Jackie, who go on an adventure with the Jack Napier A.I., revealed to have survived.

== See also ==
- Joe the Barbarian — another comic book series illustrated by Murphy
