= Batman: Curse of the White Knight =

Limited comic book series by Sean Murphy

- Cover of Batman: Curse of the White Knight #1 (July 2019), art by Sean Murphy

Publication information
- Publisher: DC Comics
- Schedule: Monthly
- Format: Limited series
- Genre: Historical; Mystery; Superhero
- Publication date: July 2019 – March 2020
- No. of issues: 8
- Main character(s): Batman; Joker; Harley Quinn; Azrael; Nightwing; Batgirl

Creative team
- Written by: Sean Murphy
- Artist: Sean Murphy
- Colorist: Matt Hollingsworth

Collected editions
- 2020 Edition: ISBN 978-1779504487

Batman: Curse of the White Knight is an American comic book published by DC Comics under its Black Label imprint. The eight-issue limited series, written and illustrated by Sean Murphy, began publication on July 24, 2019 and concluded on March 25, 2020. It is the sequel to Batman: White Knight and is the second installment in the Murphyverse's White Knight series, which takes place within a self-contained alternate reality that is different from and unrelated to the main DC Universe.

Batman: Curse of the White Knight is set one year after the events of Batman: White Knight, with the Joker enlisting Azrael, a knight of the Order of St. Dumas, to aid him in his latest scheme against Batman, which involves exposing a shocking secret regarding the Wayne family's legacy and its influence throughout Gotham City's history since its founding. As the mystery of his ancestry unravels, Batman must protect Gotham and his loved ones from both the Joker and Azrael in one last showdown that might decide the city's future and prosperity.

Curse of the White Knight received critical acclaim from critics and audiences alike, with praise for the comic's storyline, character development, and art style. A prequel one-shot, Batman: White Knight Presents Von Freeze, was released in November 2019. A spin-off series, Batman: White Knight Presents: Harley Quinn, ran from October 20, 2020 to March 23, 2021. A sequel, Batman: Beyond the White Knight, began publishing in March 2022 and ended in February 2023.

== Plot ==
Edmond Wayne, the last of the Waynes, is arrested after breaking into his family's home in London, but freed by Bakkar, a warrior-priest of the Order of St. Dumas. The two travel to Gotham Village in North America to remove a corrupt British general, Lafayette "Laffy" Arkham, who stole land from the locals of Gotham Valley and supposedly a vampire who feeds on children. In 1685, the two travel to Arkham's manor, and Edmond kills Laffy, stabbing him and pushing him down a well.

Three centuries later, one year after the defeat of Neo-Joker, Arkham Asylum is being closed for renovations, and the warden helps the Joker, now in control of his and Jack Napier's body, who removes a secret item from his old cell and stabs the warden before escaping and meeting with an accountant named Ruth Redford. At Wayne Manor, Bruce opens a letter from Alfred and follows its instructions to find Edmond Wayne's journal, before leaving to investigate Joker's escape. At Arkham, Batman interrogates the injured warden and searches Joker's old cell, discovering a secret passage and old well with a body and an erased message on the walls. Bruce reveals to Dick Grayson that he is planning to reveal his secret identity to the world after what happened the previous year. At Gotham Terrorism Oppression's (GTO) headquarters, Batman and Batgirl analyze the remains and learn that they belonged to Lafayette Arkham. Meanwhile, aging military veteran Jean-Paul Valley learns he has a terminal cancer diagnosis, with a year at most if he starts chemotherapy. While cleaning up at a church he attends, Valley is visited by the Joker, who gives him a sword, the name of Azrael, and a mission: to destroy Bruce Wayne and take back Gotham which is rightfully Valley's.

Some time later, Bruce is reading Edmond's journal when Ruth appears at his office. She explains that she created the Batman Devastation Fund, and is financial handler to Gotham's elites, while knowing Bruce's identity as Batman. She tries to convince him to help stop the Napier Initiative by continuing to fight low-level crime as Batman, while warning him of the legal and economic consequences should he reveal himself as Batman, but he refuses. Ruth turns to Valley, now calling himself Azrael, bringing along his old Army friends Michael and Gabriel. Ruth offers Valley medical treatments for his cancer, and the plan: to not only kill Batman, but to replace him. Commissioner Gordon makes a public speech announcing that he will run for mayor to better fight Gotham's elites, but is interrupted by Joker, who reveals to the world that his daughter Barbara is Batgirl. An angry Gordon yells at Bruce and Barbara for keeping this a secret, blaming Wayne for not revealing his identity sooner, believing that the Joker and the Elites would not have ruined Barbara's life. With Joker in custody, Batman approaches Harley Quinn for help, but she refuses and reveals she is pregnant with Jack/Joker's twins. In the Batcave, Batman is investigating Edmond's journal but finds that the coastline maps for 1685 and present-day Gotham are inconsistent, with the old Gotham Village now under the city reservoir, when Azrael, now wearing a red and gold outfit, hacks into the Bat-computer with the help of Mad Hatter. Taking control of the vehicles in the cave and setting charges in the mansion, Azrael's forces destroy the manor and cave, but Batman escapes into the nearby water.

Batman is rescued from drowning by the GTO, and he explains about seeing Azrael, Ruth blackmailing him, and how they need a Batman to make money with the Devastation Fund. They piece together the presence of the Order of St. Dumas using Edmond's journal, Azrael's color scheme, and a medallion form Joker's cell; Bruce explains that Bakkar was to be given half of Gotham once Arkham was dead. Batman convinces Harley to trust him to help interrogate Joker by revealing his identity to her. In custody, Joker explains that he (as Napier) found Arkham's body while digging out of his cell, finding papers and a message that told the truth of the Wayne family, "the greatest joke in all of Gotham" and he had been finally waiting to reveal it to the city in a "grand finale". He refuses to tell more, and insults Harley before threatening to abort one of her babies (figuring that one is his but one is Napier's). With no other options, the inmates of Arkham Asylum are moved to a new facility while Batman and Harley investigate Joker's old cell again. In the well, Harley asks if it is possible that Edmond killed Bakkar while Batman finds another body buried further, but Harleys' contractions become too much, and she has to deliver her twins in the cell. Gordon decides to step down as commissioner and chooses Renee Montoya as his replacement. Outside a tavern, he encounters a shadowy figure and mistakes it for Batman, apologizing before finding that the figure is Azrael. A shootout between Azrael's soldiers and GCPD ensues, while Gordon is stabbed by Azrael's flaming sword, shooting off his revolver before falling.

Gordon is rushed to the hospital but dies on the operating table. At the GTO, Barbara is angry at Batman and the other officers before running off. Montoya, now commissioner, and knowing that Azrael said his name to Gordon, begins the manhunt. Bruce goes to Leslie Thompkins's clinic, where Harley and her twins are resting, and breaks down to Leslie over Gordon's death. At GTO HQ, Barbara finds Azrael's military vehicle from CCTV footage, and heads off with Bullock to avenge her father's death. In a safehouse under the clinic, Bruce goes over the journal and Joker's cryptic statement about Gotham "drowning in secrets". Leslie reveals that she and Alfred knew about the journal: years earlier, Alfred found a letter to Bruce involving an object of repercussions, and the two went to an old pharmacy where it was sent from. There they met a mysterious priest of the Order of St. Dumas, who took the journal from the Joker, and that he took it before it could reignite the blood feud between the Wayne and Bakkar bloodlines; Alfred wished to destroy the journal but Leslie convinced him that Bruce had a right to know. On a highway, Azrael and his allies are intercepted by Barbara and Bullock, but Batman (using a hidden transmitter in their Batmobile) stops Barbara from executing Azrael, only for Azrael to break Barbara's back. Batman tries to fight Azrael and is caught off-guard when Azrael agrees that the Waynes are the rightful protectors of Gotham. Azrael and Gabriel escape while their friend Michael is killed in the shootout.

Later, Gordon's funeral is held, while Batman, feeling he would not be welcome after recent events, instead investigates the reservoir and finds a town underneath, with a chapel of St. Dumas. At the GTO, looking over evidence such as documents from 1700s, he learns that the reservoir was originally a bay that went inland with the original Gotham Village; it was flooded by Edmond Wayne, who killed Bakkar, then used his position as lord of Gotham to convince the British to flood the valley for a port, displacing the villagers and building the Wayne fortune by selling land to the East India Company. Convinced that Jack Napier may have given him the "drowning" clue, he again convinces Harley to help to bring Jack's personality out, this time without Batman around to bring out the Joker. At New Arkham, Harley manages to bring Jack, and he remembers that Joker gave Azrael the sword in the chapel, and the erased message, but Jack tells Harley not to tell it to Bruce, because it would "destroy him". The GTO manage to get Valley's DNA off the bullet Gordon fired, and find more about his history with military black ops. At Ruth's office, she tells Azrael that their arrangement is over, as he was meant to quietly kill and replace Batman, not wreak havoc (including killing Gordon). When Azrael tries to execute her, Bane appears, having been hired to kill him. Gabriel arrives to remove Bane's Venom tube and Azrael kills Bane with his sword. He then uses the sword (which contains a special form of napalm) to burn Redford alive, but not before getting her to give a list of her clients. Later at New Arkham, Valley, now wearing an armored Batsuit built for him by his former benefactors, breaks in and massacres a dozen inmates, including Scarecrow, Killer Croc, Baby-Doll, Ventriloquist, Penguin, Roxy Rocket, Two-Face, and Riddler, and many guards, before freeing Joker and escaping.

At Redford's burned office, Montoya and Duke find her hard drive, which survived the fire, containing information on the new suit and the Elite clients. Following Harley's intel from Jack, Batman heads to the chapel and meets with the priest, who explains that they raised Jean-Paul Valley but sent him to war, hoping it would quench Valley's bloodlust, but the Joker ruined it by telling Valley the truth. The priest explains more of the history: Bakkar was exiled from the Order for joining rather than converting sinners and sought vengeance by seizing power, corrupting Edmond Wayne and joining to take over the underworld of old Gotham by killing everyone in their way from the docks to "Laffy" Arkham. He refuses to tell Batman anymore, but does reveal his name as Jason Blood.

Batman is called to New Arkham, where GCPD managed to kill Gabriel but the building collapsed due to the fighting. Finding an injured Harley, she says that Joker stole her babies, and she and Batman head to Old Arkham to find them. As Batman and Azrael fight in the halls, Joker holds the twins hostage, but Jack manages to take control of the body and gives the babies back to Harley before Joker reasserts control. As the two personalities fight for control, Jack throws Harley his gun to shoot him, who misses. Joker finds Batman and Azrael fighting, and reveals the final pieces of the truth: Bakkar was the one who stabbed Edmond Wayne and threw him down the well, stealing his family ring and his identity, flooding the valley and making the deals to build Gotham under Edmond's name. Edmond managed to survive long enough to write the message in blood on the wall of the well: "I AM EDMOND WAYNE". Joker further explains that he is always smiling because of "the joke": that Gotham's greatest hero is descended from criminals, and that Bruce is not a Wayne, but a fraud, and Azrael is the true Wayne. Harley manages to save Batman by kicking Azrael and shoots Joker, killing him and Jack.

At the safehouse, Bruce deals with the revelations, contemplating how he wanted to uphold the Wayne tradition of defending people, but he himself is not one. Furthermore, the list of Ruth's clients that was found revealed that most of the money was channeled through Wayne-Corp, but due to his role as Batman, he could never pay attention. Unsure how to be Bruce Wayne anymore, Harley comforts him and points out that Gotham forgave Jack/Joker, and if he reveals his identity he will still have his friends. At the hospital, where Barbara is now walking with crutches, Bruce says that he will reveal his identity to destroy the elites, expressing regret at not killing Azrael earlier, and guilt about Gordon, but Barbara tells him that her father supported him and would trust his decision.

Batman hijacks a press briefing by Montoya to reveal his identity to the city, and also to state that he will be dissolving his company and his inheritance will be used to fund nonprofits to rebuild Gotham, before asking that all citizens stay inside so he can hunt Azrael without hurting anyone. Later at GTO, he explains that he will turn himself in once it is over. As the police and vigilantes prepare to hunt Azrael down, Dick tries to talk Bruce out of killing him when they find him, but is unsuccessful. Batman manages to catch Azrael, but as he fires a gun at him is unable to hit him, and Azrael captures him. As Azrael describes what he sees in Bruce and their destinies, and tells Bruce there will be a flood, Dick saves Bruce but sees that he has a gun. The two argue, and Dick pleads for Bruce not to kill Azrael, who manages to escape in a nearby Coast Guard helicopter and heads to the reservoir to destroy it. Batman heads to the reservoir after taking two rapiers with the Wayne crest that Alfred had shown him how to use in the past. After shooting down Azrael's stolen helicopter, Bruce manages to convince Azrael to fight with their swords. After a brutal duel, Azrael insults Bruce's parents and if they knew about their bloodline, enraging Bruce to cut the former's throat. Bruce refuses to let Valley die, and attempts to give a blood transfusion as Valley tells of how Blood, the last knight of St. Dumas, found Edmond Wayne's daughter with a prostitute and hid her in the Order under the name "Valley", and acknowledges Batman as the true protector of Gotham before dying.

Bruce turns himself in at GCPD headquarters, and talks to Harley (disguised as a police officer), thanking her and saying she saved his soul. As he is taken away, Lucius Fox oversees the transfer of the Wayne funds; as well, GCPD gains a large portion, to spend on upgrades including new vehicles with the possibility of recruiting new vigilantes to the GTO. As Bruce sits in jail awaiting trial, he explains to his guard, who is revealed to be Jason Todd, that he put him on duty so they could talk.

== Production ==
=== Development ===
Batman: Curse of the White Knight, a sequel to Batman: White Knight that was released in October 2017, was in development since September 2018, once again written and illustrated by Sean Murphy. Both books are part of the Murphyverse's White Knight series. Murphy came up with the idea of creating a sequel to Batman: White Knight when he was writing the script for the eighth and final issue of the series. Although he did not think he would have another opportunity to write and draw yet another Batman comic book, a continuation was something he did not originally plan, but correctly believed that DC Comics would give him permission to do so at the time.

=== Writing ===
For Curse of the White Knight, Murphy wanted to focus on Gotham City's past and how it came about, claiming that because the White Knight series is set in an alternate continuity unrelated to the main DC Universe, the Gotham presented in the books deserved a different origin in comparison to that of its original counterpart usually featured in the mainstream comics. Another plot point for the series was how the Wayne family has negatively affected the city throughout history, which he felt would have a detrimental impact on Batman (Bruce Wayne), their latest descendant.

The main antagonist of Curse of the White Knight is the Jean-Paul Valley incarnation of Azrael, a character who is typically portrayed in the comics as an antihero and ally of Batman. Murphy said that he wanted a villain who would be a worthy opponent to Bruce Wayne and his family legacy, while also incorporating elements of the character from 1990s, such as his flaming sword. As inspiration for his version of Azrael, Murphy based him on John Rambo, giving Azrael a much older age and turning him into a special forces veteran suffering from post-traumatic stress disorder (PTSD), with Murphy feeling this would make Azrael a more compelling and empathetic adversary for Batman than most of his enemies.

=== Design ===
Over the course of the series, Azrael wears two different outfits: the first being red and gold, designed to resemble the character's original costume in the comics, while the second outfit is an armored Batsuit that is nearly identical to the one worn by Azrael in the classic Batman: Knightfall story arc. In Curse of the White Knight, there is a set of Batmobiles that are used throughout the comic book, each with a design based on a previous incarnation of the vehicle from different media, such as the one seen in the 1960s Batman TV series, the one from Tim Burton's Batman and Batman Returns films, the Tumbler from Christopher Nolan's The Dark Knight trilogy and others as well.

=== Conclusion ===
In an interview with The Hollywood Reporter, Murphy spoke briefly about how he sees the White Knight series as a "constant '3rd act' story", believing that each volume appears to be the last in the series when in reality it is not. More than a week before the release of the eighth and final chapter of Batman: Curse of the White Knight, Murphy teased: "In the last issue, Bruce makes a decision that will change the rest of his life and change the course of Gotham forever. The final (battle) between Batman and Azrael is literally a sword wielding duel that might leave one of them dead". Ultimately, when questioned if he intended to write more comic books for the White Knight series, Murphy said he had at least two installments planned after Curse of the White Knight.

== Publication ==
Batman: Curse of the White Knight was written and illustrated by Sean Murphy and colored by Matt Hollingsworth. It is the second installment in the Murphyverse's White Knight series, being preceded by Batman: White Knight. Curse of the White Knight was published under the DC Comics' Black Label, an imprint designed to allow writers to submit their own unique interpretations of traditional DC Universe (DCU) characters for a more mature audience. The eight issues of Curse of the White Knight were released by DC at monthly intervals, with the first being published on July 24, 2019 and the last on March 25, 2020. A collected edition containing all eight issues of the comic book was released on September 15, 2020, while a special edition of the series was launched in honor of Batman Day four days later.

=== Issues ===
Title	Issue	Publication date	Ref.
Batman: Curse of the White Knight	#1	July 24, 2019	
Batman: Curse of the White Knight	#2	August 28, 2019	
Batman: Curse of the White Knight	#3	September 25, 2019	
Batman: Curse of the White Knight	#4	October 23, 2019	
Batman: Curse of the White Knight	#5	December 11, 2019	
Batman: Curse of the White Knight	#6	January 22, 2020	
Batman: Curse of the White Knight	#7	February 26, 2020	
Batman: Curse of the White Knight	#8	March 25, 2020	

== Reception ==
=== Critical response ===
Batman: Curse of the White Knight #8 is the larger-than-life finale to Sean Murphy's second installment of his take on the Dark Knight mythos. While this finale mirrors the blockbuster movie tone of the final issue of the original Batman: White Knight, it doesn't quite have the same emotional weight. Not only is Batman: Curse of the White Knight #8 a solid ending to a story about legacy, betrayal and salvation, it's a reminder as to why the best superhero stories are often ones unhampered by the fictional world in which they occur.

— Mike Fugere of Comic Book Resources evaluating the eighth and final issue of Batman: Curse of the White Knight.

Reviewing Batman: Curse of the White Knight, Matthew Aguilar of ComicBook.com praised Murphy's art style, while also commending the dialogue between the characters and the series' portrayal of Batman as well. Kofi Outlaw of ComicBook.com compared Curse of the White Knight to Tim Burton's 1989 film, mainly due to the Batmobile featured in it, which is an exact recreation of the one seen in the film. Other similarities and references to Burton's work observed by Outlaw are the Joker's civilian persona of Jack Napier (actually the character's real name in the film) and the series' action sequences, something that Outlaw thought "could've been lifted right out of Burton's films".

Dorian Reyes Black of Screen Rant highlighted that, due to its "grounded and gritty" take, the series tackles heavy subjects such as systemic inequality and distrust of law enforcement, which, according to Black, "is nothing to laugh at", but also commented that the lighthearted references to the happiest moments in Batman's comic book history is what makes the plot fun. Dom Mah of Screen Rant opined that Curse of the White Knight is "an era-defining reframe of an iconic character" as to how it reflects and addresses several central aspects of Batman's mythology as it pertains to ongoing debates in the United States.

Jesse Schedeen of IGN described the second volume as "a worthy followup to the original", with him regarding Murphy's illustrations as "the driving force of the White Knight universe", in addition to complimenting Batman's characterization as a more sympathetic figure, calling it an improvement over the first book and noting that "there's a humanity to the character that was mostly lacking the first time around". Lissete Gonzalez of DC Comics.com expressed her opinion on how unique and exciting the trajectory of Batman: Curse of the White Knight was, admitting that what she appreciated most about the storytelling was the way past events continue to have major effects and consequences on current events in the comic. Olly MacNamee of Comicon.com also likened the comic book to The Dark Knight Returns, seeing Curse of the White Knight as a fresh, modern take on the miniseries. According to Comic Book Roundup, the entire series received an average rating of 8.8 out of 10 based on 133 reviews.

=== Merchandise ===
In 2020, McFarlane Toys released an Azrael-based action figure from Batman: Curse of the White Knight, with accessories including a sword with removable flames and figure stand, plus a collectible art card with Azrael's image on the front and his biography on the back. McFarlane Toys launched an action figure pack based on Curse of the White Knight in November 2021, priced at $39.99 (no additional charges). As part of the DC Multiverse toy line, the pack included two Batman and Azrael figures, both at 7-inch scale and with up to 22 points of articulation, plus two art cards, swords, a Batarang and flame effects.

== Future ==
=== Prequel ===
A special one-shot issue written by Murphy and illustrated by Klaus Janson, Batman: White Knight Presents Von Freeze, was released on November 20, 2019. As the third installment in the Murphyverse's White Knight series, it acts as a prequel to Batman: Curse of the White Knight, and follows Mr. Freeze as he reveals the difficult childhood he faced during World War II in Nazi Germany to Thomas Wayne, while the latter's wife Martha must give birth to their son Bruce.

=== Spin-off series ===
A six-issue spin-off series focusing on Harley Quinn, Batman: White Knight Presents: Harley Quinn, co-written by Murphy and his wife Katana Collins and illustrated by Matteo Scalera, ran from October 20, 2020 to March 23, 2021. It is the fourth installment in the White Knight series, taking place two years after the events of Curse of the White Knight, and centers on Quinn as she investigates a string of murders in Gotham City while trying to adjust to her new life as a single mother of twins. The collected edition of White Knight Presents: Harley Quinn was published on June 29, 2021, also featuring the sixth chapter of the Harley Quinn Black + White + Red digital comic.

=== Sequel ===
A fifth installment in the White Knight series and sequel to Curse of the White Knight, Batman: Beyond the White Knight, began publication in March 2022 and ended in February 2023, with Murphy once again serving as writer and illustrator for the comic book. The comic is set twelve years after the events of the previous volume, with the plot revolving around young Terry McGinnis, who becomes Bruce Wayne's successor as Batman by stealing a technologically advanced Batsuit to avenge his father's murder involving corrupt CEO Derek Powers, all while a middle-aged Bruce escapes from prison to stop Terry and retrieve the Batsuit.

== See also ==
- Punk Rock Jesus, another comic book series written and illustrated by Murphy.
