= Murphyverse =

Line of comic books under the Black Label imprint owned by DC Comics

"Murphyverse" thematic stories

Publication information
- Publisher: DC Comics (Black Label)
- Schedule: Varied
Title(s)
List of publications
- Formats: Varied
- Original language: English
- Genre: Superhero
- Publication date: 2017–2023

Creative team
- Writer(s): Varied
- Artist(s): Varied
- Letterer(s): Varied
- Colorist(s): Varied

The Murphyverse is the unofficial name given to a line of American comic books created by writer/artist Sean Murphy, and published by DC Comics under its Black Label imprint.

== Development ==
Following the critical and commercial success of Batman: White Knight (2017–18) and its sequels Batman: Curse of the White Knight (2019–20) and Batman: Beyond the White Knight (2022–23) — three limited series created by Sean Murphy — DC Comics was reportedly interested in creating a comic book line centered around Murphy's works, with him overseeing the making of each comic as they are developed by different creative teams and then published by DC under its Black Label imprint. Although it currently does not have an official name, the line is commonly referred to as the "Murphyverse".

In revealing vision for the Murphyverse, Murphy laid out six rules that all writers and illustrators must follow when creating stories for it: First, any character that dies cannot be subsequently resurrected; second, there can be no internal monologues; third, no series can be rushed; fourth, the authors of the books must have as their primary focus the goal of pleasing their readers; fifth, there must be at least one vehicle, such as the Batmobile, in each comic; and sixth, no series may crossover with another, despite taking place in the same shared universe.

While the Murphyverse has so far focused on the superhero Batman and his overall cast of supporting characters, Murphy has indicated that he plans to expand the line with the release of comics based on other DC characters and teams, such as Superman, Wonder Woman and the Justice League. Murphy considered his comic book line as DC's equivalent of Marvel Comics' Ultimate imprint.

== Publications ==
=== Featured titles ===
Title	Issues	Publication date	Writer(s)	Artist(s)	Letterer(s)	Colorist(s)	Ref.
Released
Batman: White Knight	#1–8	October 4, 2017 – May 9, 2018	Sean Murphy		Todd Klein	Matt Hollingsworth	
Batman: Curse of the White Knight	#1–8	July 24, 2019 – March 25, 2020	Sean Murphy		AndWorld Design	Matt Hollingsworth	
Batman: White Knight Presents Von Freeze	#1	November 20, 2019	Sean Murphy	Klaus Janson	AndWorld Design	Matt Hollingsworth	
Batman: White Knight Presents: Harley Quinn	#1–6	October 20, 2020 – March 23, 2021	Katana Collins; Sean Murphy	Matteo Scalera	AndWorld Design	Dave Stewart	
Batman: Beyond the White Knight	#1–8	March 29, 2022 – February 14, 2023	Sean Murphy		AndWorld Design	Dave Stewart	
Batman: White Knight Presents: Red Hood	#1–2	August 2, 2022 – August 23, 2022	Sean Murphy; Clay McCormack	Simone Di Meo; George Kambadais	AndWorld Design	Dave Stewart	
Batman: White Knight Presents: Generation Joker	#1–6	May 9, 2023 – October 17, 2023	Katana Collins; Clay McCormack; Sean Murphy	Mirka Andolfo	D. C. Hopkins	Alejandro Sánchez	
In development
Untitled Batman: Beyond the White Knight sequel	TBA	TBA	Sean Murphy	TBA	TBA	TBA	
Untitled Catwoman series	TBA	TBA	Clay McCormack	TBA	TBA	TBA	
Untitled Superman series	TBA	TBA	TBA	TBA	TBA	TBA	
World's Finest: White Knight	TBA	TBA	Sean Murphy	Sean Murphy	TBA	TBA	
Unproduced
Untitled Batgirl series	N/A	N/A	N/A	N/A	N/A	N/A	
Untitled Nightwing series	N/A	N/A	N/A	N/A	N/A	N/A	

=== Collected editions ===
Title	Publication date	Collected material	Pages	Format	ISBN	Ref.
Batman: White Knight	October 9, 2018	Batman: White Knight #1–8	232	Complete	978-1401279592	
Batman: White Knight – The Hardcover Edition	May 15, 2019	Batman: White Knight #1–8	232	Hardcover	978-1401298821	
Batman: White Knight – The Deluxe Edition	March 4, 2020	Batman: White Knight #1–8	248	Deluxe	978-1779500649	
Batman: Curse of the White Knight	September 15, 2020	Batman: Curse of the White Knight #1–8 and Batman: White Knight Presents Von Freeze #1	272	Complete	978-1779504487	
Batman: Curse of the White Knight 2020 Batman Day Special Edition	September 19, 2020	Batman: Curse of the White Knight #1	33	Special	N/A	
Batman: White Knight Presents: Harley Quinn	June 29, 2021	Batman: White Knight Presents: Harley Quinn #1–6 and a story from Harley Quinn Black + White + Red #6	168	Complete	978-1779514912	
Batman: Beyond the White Knight Showcase Edition	May 31, 2022	Batman: Beyond the White Knight #1–2	48	Prestige	N/A	
Batman: Curse of the White Knight – The Deluxe Edition	September 27, 2022	Batman: Curse of the White Knight #1–8 and Batman: White Knight Presents Von Freeze #1	280	Deluxe	978-1779516817	N/A
Batman: Beyond the White Knight	June 2023	Batman: Beyond the White Knight #1–8 and Batman: White Knight Presents Red Hood #1–2	280	Complete	N/A	N/A
Batman: White Knight Presents: Generation Joker	April 16, 2024	Batman: White Knight Presents: Generation Joker #1–6	156	Complete	978-1779524904	N/A
Batman: White Knight Presents: Harley Quinn and Generation Joker: The Deluxe Edition	September 2, 2025	Batman: White Knight Presents: Harley Quinn #1–6 and Batman: White Knight Presents: Generation Joker #1–6	368	Deluxe	978-1799502708	N/A
Batman: White Knight: Absolute Edition	May 12, 2026	Batman: White Knight #1–8	2×248	Absolute	978-1799507987	N/A
Batman: Beyond the White Knight: The Deluxe Edition	December 8, 2026	Batman: Beyond the White Knight #1–8 and Batman: White Knight Presents Red Hood #1–2	304	Deluxe	978-1799500810	N/A

== See also ==
- The Sandman Universe
