= Batman: White Knight =

Limited comic book series by Sean Murphy

- Front page of the hardcover edition of Batman: White Knight, art by Sean Murphy

Publication information
- Publisher: DC Comics
- Schedule: Monthly
- Format: Limited series
- Genre: Political; Superhero
- Publication date: October 2017 – May 2018
- No. of issues: 8
- Main character(s): Batman; Joker; Harley Quinn; James Gordon; Batgirl; Nightwing

Creative team
- Written by: Sean Murphy
- Artist: Sean Murphy
- Letterer: Todd Klein
- Colorist: Matt Hollingsworth

Collected editions
- 2018 Edition: ISBN 978-1401279592
- Hardcover Edition: ISBN 978-1401298821
- Deluxe Edition: ISBN 978-1401279592

Batman: White Knight is an American comic book published by DC Comics. The eight-issue limited series, written and illustrated by Sean Murphy, began monthly publication in October 2017 and concluded in May 2018. In the series, the Joker is seemingly cured of his madness and sets out to become a politician under his real name of Jack Napier, seeking to change his public image as a "villain" and save Gotham City from Batman, whom he views as the real enemy of the city.

A sequel titled Batman: Curse of the White Knight ran from July 24, 2019 to March 25, 2020. A second sequel, Batman: Beyond the White Knight, began publication on March 29, 2022 and concluded on February 14, 2023.

== Plot ==
Batman, Batgirl and Nightwing pursue the Joker in a reckless high-speed chase through Gotham City, causing significant property damage and nearly killing multiple bystanders. Batman eventually corners the Joker and chases him on foot into a pharmaceutical warehouse. He beats the Joker and is goaded into force-feeding him a bottle of unknown medication which turns him sane.

Batman's allies watch in disgust and footage of the assault is leaked to the news. In light of these events, Gotham begins to debate over whether Batman is doing more harm than good. Bruce's recent violence stems from Alfred being near death, kept alive only by Freeze-Tech. The Joker, now using his real name, Jack Napier, wins a case against the GCPD for insufficient evidence and for non-intervention in his beating.

Freed, Napier visits Harley Quinn, who attacks him and insists he is not himself. Saved by a second Harley, Napier learns she is the original but was replaced. When the Joker's obsession with Batman culminated in Jason Todd's torture, Quinzel left him to try and help save Todd's life. During a subsequent bank robbery, the Joker had unwittingly adopted a hostage, Marian Drews, as the new Harley Quinn.

Bruce and Victor Fries develop a treatment for their loved ones' cryogenic illnesses. Despite not being fully tested, Fries attempts to use the new system to resuscitate his wife, Nora. Having anticipated this, Bruce hooks the system up to Fries' suit, curing him of his own illness, but aging him horribly. Later, Bruce is left shaken by the discovery that many of his fellow billionaires have been profiting off of Batman's destructive battles with criminals by purchasing destroyed properties then flipping them after they are repaired by the city, along with the revelation that his father Thomas Wayne funded Fries Sr. to create Freeze-Tech, circumventing U.S. laws by tunneling under Gotham's German embassy. Fries Sr. later cut ties with Thomas to build a superweapon.

Now running for councilman, Napier funds construction of a library in the impoverished district of Backport and befriends Duke Thomas, an ex-GCPD officer who runs a local youth group. Using the Mad Hatter's technology, Napier mind controls Clayface into servitude. He then drugs Batman's rogues gallery with drinks laced with Clayface's essence which he can use to control them by proxy.

Making the villains rampage across the city as a distraction, Napier gains access to restricted documents and discovers a hidden tax fund for Batman's collateral damage. In an attempt to move the villains to a less-populated area, Batman baits them into attacking Napier's Backport library, thinking that they would not attack Napier's property; the villains proceed to raze the library and damage the neighborhood. Critically injured, Bruce returns to the Batcave and collapses at Alfred's bedside. He wakes to find Alfred has used his life-support to stabilize Bruce at the cost of his own life.

Nightwing and Batgirl grow increasingly concerned with Bruce's developing obsession in convicting Napier. Drews, now the Neo Joker, gains control of Clayface's remains, placing Gotham's villains under her power.

Napier presents the GCPD with an offer. Napier offers to use his power as a councilman to reallocate the hidden tax fund to the GCPD, giving Gotham an accountable, state-sanctioned, Batman alternative task force known as the GTO – the Gotham Terrorism Oppression unit. The Neo Joker attacks the GCPD, prompting Gordon to side with Napier and place an APB on Batman. Bested by the GTO, which has recruited Duke, Nightwing and Batgirl, Batman is arrested by Napier. Neo Joker uses Fries Sr.'s superweapon to freeze Gotham Harbor, demanding that Joker be given to her.

Napier develops a tolerance to his medication, making him periodically revert into the Joker. Napier frees Batman, asking for help stopping the Neo Joker in exchange for a confession, provided Quinzel's continued freedom. Napier, Batman and the GTO organize an assault on the Neo Joker's freeze ray, piloting a fleet of Batmobiles taken from Wayne Manor. Making peace with Nightwing, Batgirl, and Gordon, Batman races through Gotham tunnels with Napier, who has reverted to the Joker. The GTO bests the Neo Joker's forces and reverses the freeze ray, flooding the tunnels. Overpowering the Neo Joker, the Joker releases Clayface and undoes the mind control. With Batman protecting him from Clayface, the Joker and Quinzel apprehend the Neo Joker, and Napier, gaining control for a last time, confesses his love for Quinzel.

Confessing to his crimes, Napier surrenders and is granted a nicer Arkham cell and a wedding to Quinzel; as he finishes his vows, Napier permanently reverts to the Joker. Using Napier's remaining funds, Quinzel begins restoring Backport. Confronting Quinzel, Batman reveals that she manufactured the Joker's medication and orchestrated events so the opening chase would end in the factory and be recorded. Quinzel explains that she did this to break their stalemate before they destroy Gotham.

Meeting with Gordon, Batman gives him the keys to the original Batmobiles for the GTO and confesses that Napier was right about him. Revealing that he has realized that he has been taking pleasure in harming criminals and that he has allowed himself to go too far in his war against crime, Batman unmasks himself in front of Gordon to earn back his trust.

== Production ==
=== Development ===
Cover of Batman: White Knight #1 (December 2017), art by Sean Murphy.

Batman: White Knight, a comic book limited series by writer and illustrator Sean Murphy, was in development since July 2017. Murphy came up with the idea for the story of Batman: White Knight when he was 12 years old while watching Batman: The Animated Series, and as he grew older, more he thought about the premise of the series, adding details and elements to its plot as time went on.

=== Writing ===
In Batman: White Knight, the central premise for the series is about reversing the roles of Batman and the Joker, portraying the Joker as a hero and Batman as a villain. For Murphy, his goal was to portray a more realistic vision of Gotham City, where crime could not be stopped with a fist, namely Batman's methods; this led to Murphy turning the Joker into a politician, using the character's wit and charisma to win over the people of Gotham.

While writing Batman: White Knight, Murphy created a new version of the character Duke Thomas, basing him on the Marvel Comics superhero Luke Cage as a source of inspiration. According to Murphy, Duke represents the poor communities that are oppressed and neglected in Gotham. Originally, Murphy planned to have Duke take on the mantle of Robin, but was discouraged from doing so by his team. In the White Knight universe, Jason Todd was the first Robin instead of Dick Grayson as in most comics. As stated by Murphy, this change was not intentional, but was actually the result of a timeline error that went unnoticed by him. By the time he realized it, however, it was too late to correct this and he decided to adopt the shift.

DC Comics had no problems with the ideas that Murphy had for the series like changing the timeline in Batman's history, but the adult content that Murphy intended to include, such as nudity and profanity, was not allowed.

=== Influences ===
For Batman: White Knight, Murphy drew influences from a variety of Batman-related media, including television series, live-action films, and video games. The Joker's real name for this interpretation is Jack Napier, a reference to Tim Burton's 1989 Batman film, in which the Joker (played by Jack Nicholson) also shares that name. The Batmobile from that film, along with the Tumbler featured in Christopher Nolan's The Dark Knight trilogy, inspired the look of Murphy's version of the car in the comic book, while also incorporating elements from F-1 cars; Murphy described his version as a cross between rock tumbler and a sports car. Additionally, one of the series' subplots involves a freeze ray used to encase a portion of Gotham in ice, a nod to the 1997 film Batman & Robin.

== Publication ==
Batman: White Knight was written and illustrated by Sean Murphy, with color from Matt Hollingsworth and lettering by Todd Klein. It was initially intended to be a seven-issue story, but was extended to eight after the release of the first issue, which was published by DC on October 4, 2017, while the final issue was released on May 9, 2018. A trade paperback collecting all eight issues was released on October 9, 2018, being the first graphic novel published under the DC Black Label, an imprint designed to allow writers to submit their own unique interpretations of traditional DC Universe (DCU) characters for a more mature audience. A hardcover edition was released on May 15, 2019, while a deluxe edition of the series was published on March 4, 2020.

=== Issues ===
Title	Issue	Publication date	Ref.
Batman: White Knight	#1	October 4, 2017	
Batman: White Knight	#2	November 1, 2017	
Batman: White Knight	#3	December 6, 2017	
Batman: White Knight	#4	January 3, 2018	
Batman: White Knight	#5	February 7, 2018	
Batman: White Knight	#6	March 7, 2018	
Batman: White Knight	#7	April 4, 2018	
Batman: White Knight	#8	May 9, 2018	

== Reception ==
=== Popularity ===
Upon its release, Batman: White Knight quickly became one of the most popular Batman comics in recent years, with its massive success causing it to be compared to some of the greatest Batman comics of all time, such as The Dark Knight Returns, Batman: The Long Halloween, Batman: Earth One and other series. It debuted at #1 on BookScan's bestseller list, tracking its purchase levels across online stores and major retailers like Amazon, Barnes & Noble, Walmart, Target Books, independent bookstores, and other places. The series also took the top spot on Diamond Comic Distributors' list of graphic novels for the month of October 2018. The overwhelming purchase of the book by fans prompted DC to publish a second printing of Batman: White Knight.

== Future ==
=== Murphyverse ===
In March 2020, DC was reportedly interested in creating a mini imprint centered around Murphy's works, which was made possible primarily by the massive success of Batman: White Knight. Referred to as the "Murphyverse", the imprint serves as one of the DC Black Label lines, intending to feature limited series developed by writers and artists other than Murphy, and those series, in turn, will be set in the shared universe first established in the White Knight series.

=== Sequels ===
==== Batman: Curse of the White Knight ====
A sequel series titled Batman: Curse of the White Knight, with Murphy returning as writer and illustrator, began publishing on July 24, 2019, and concluded on March 25, 2020, as a title under the DC Black Label imprint. It is set after the events of Batman: White Knight, and follows the Joker recruiting the vigilante Azrael to aid him in his latest scheme against Batman, which involves exposing a shocking secret about the Wayne family's legacy and its influence throughout Gotham City's history since its founding.

==== Batman: Beyond the White Knight ====
A second sequel series, Batman: Beyond the White Knight, was published under the DC Black Label imprint on March 29, 2022 with Murphy once again serving as writer and illustrator for the third volume. It is based on the animated television series Batman Beyond, and takes place twelve years after the events of Curse of the White Knight, with the plot revolving around young Terry McGinnis, who becomes the new Batman to avenge his father's murder at the hands of corrupt CEO Derek Powers, all while a middle-aged Bruce Wayne escapes from prison to stop Terry.

== See also ==
- Tokyo Ghost, another comic book series illustrated by Murphy.
