= Act of God (disambiguation) =

Act of God is a legal term for events outside of human control.

Act of God or Acts of God may also refer to:

- Divine intervention, an event attributed to God

== Film and television ==
- Act of God (film), a 2009 documentary film
- "Act of God" (The Crown) a 2016 television episode
- "Act of God" (Law & Order), a 1995 television episode
- "Acts of God" (The Walking Dead), a 2022 television episode

== Literature ==
- Acts of God, a 2001 novel by Mary Morris
- Acts of God (novel), a 2003 novel by James BeauSeigneur

== Music ==
- Act of God (album), a 1988 album by Znöwhite
- Act of God, a 1999 album by Pro-Pain
- Acts of God (At War with Self album), 2007
- Acts of God (Immolation album), 2022
- "Act of God", a song by Fear Factory from the 2004 album Archetype

== Other uses ==
- An Act of God, a 2015 play by David Javerbaum
- JLA: Act of God, a DC Comics limited series
