= Sean Murphy (artist) =

American comic book creator (born 1980)

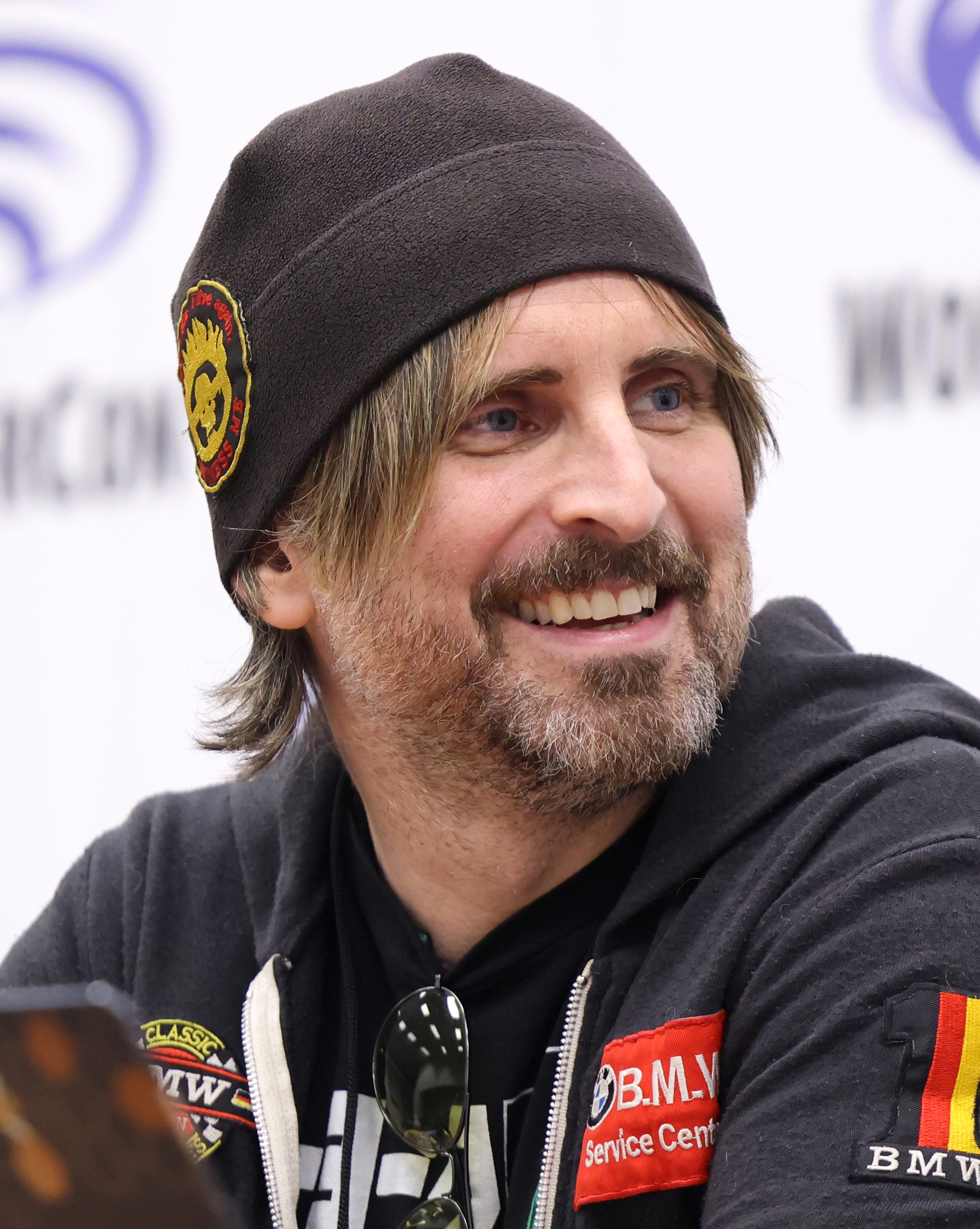
- Murphy in 2025
- Born: Sean Gordon Murphy Nashua, New Hampshire
- Areas: Writer, Penciller, Artist, Inker
- Notable works: Batman/Scarecrow: Year One; Teen Titans; Hellblazer; Shaun of the Dead; Joe the Barbarian; The Wake; Tokyo Ghost; Murphyverse (Batman: White Knight, Curse of the White Knight, and Beyond the White Knight)

Sean Gordon Murphy (born 1980) is an American comic book writer and artist known for work on books such as Joe the Barbarian with Grant Morrison, Chrononauts with Mark Millar, American Vampire: Survival of the Fittest and The Wake with Scott Snyder, Tokyo Ghost with Rick Remender, and the miniseries Punk Rock Jesus.

He is also the creator of the Murphyverse, a collection of stories about Batman that is separate from the main DC Universe. Murphyverse titles include Batman: White Knight and its sequels Curse of the White Knight and Beyond the White Knight, which Murphy wrote and illustrated.

== Early life ==
Sean Gordon Murphy was born in Nashua, New Hampshire in late 1980. He showed an interest in comics during grade school. In Salem he apprenticed to local painter and cartoonist, Leslie Swank. He graduated from Pinkerton Academy in 1999, and attended Massachusetts College of Art in Boston, and then Savannah College of Art and Design.

== Career ==
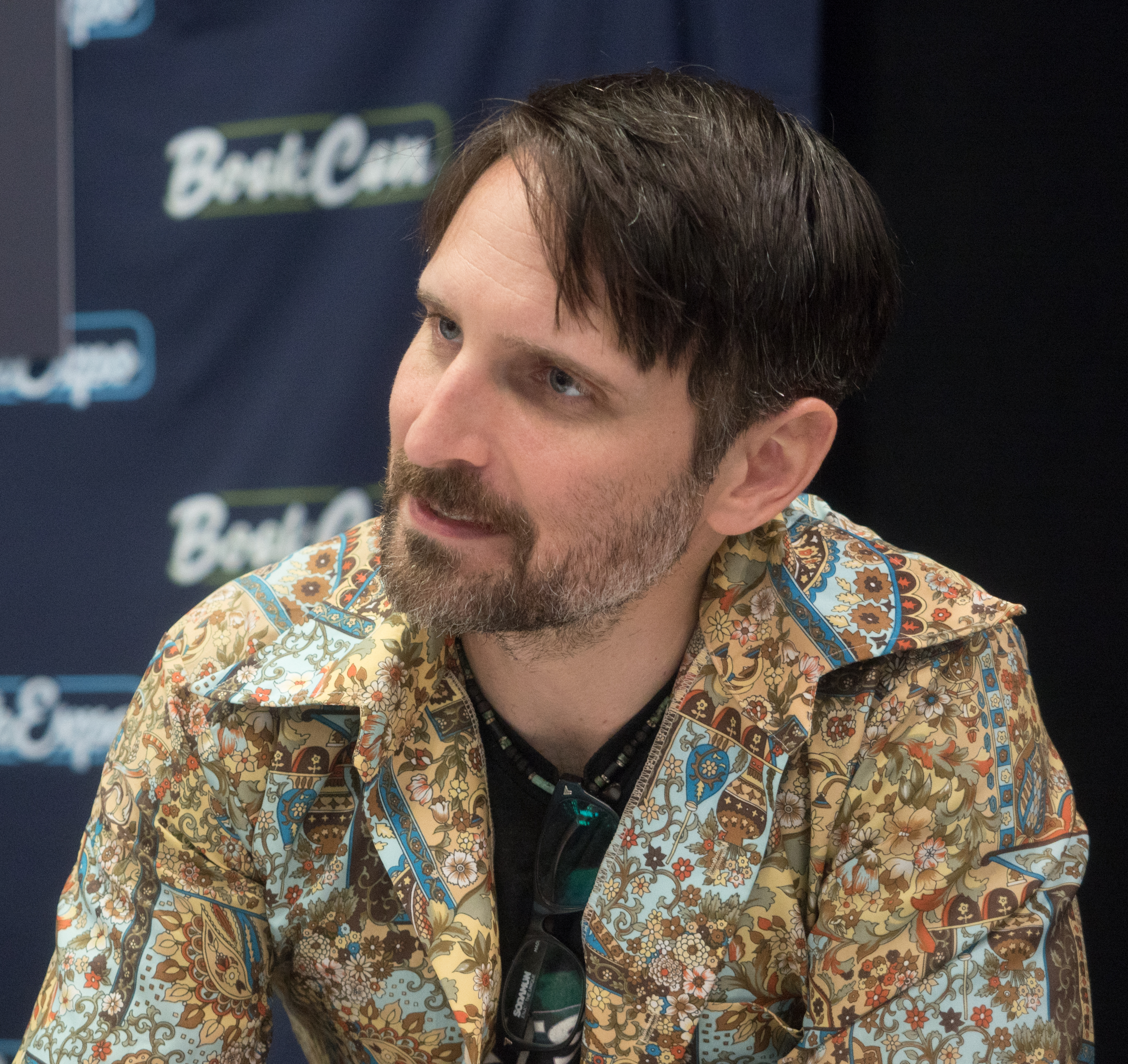
Murphy at BookCon in June 2019

Murphy started working professionally before graduating, contributing to titles such as Star Wars and Noble Causes before moving on to various projects for Dark Horse Comics. His comic book work includes the miniseries Batman/Scarecrow: Year One with writer Bruce Jones for DC Comics and the graphic novel Off Road for Oni Press. He has also had a run on Hellblazer In 2005, he published his first original graphic novel, Off Road, which went on to win an American Library Association Award for young adults. In 2006, he illustrated the Dark Horse miniseries Outer Orbit along with its co-creator, Zach Howard. In 2010, Vertigo published the first instalment of the Joe the Barbarian series, with art by Murphy and a text by Grant Morrison.

In 2012 Murphy wrote, pencilled and inked the six-issue, black and white creator-owned Vertigo miniseries Punk Rock Jesus, the protagonist of which is a clone of Jesus Christ who starred in his own reality television program as a child, and has grown into a rebellious young man. The miniseries was described as Murphy's "passion project years in the making", and focuses on religion and the media in the United States as themes, more complicated issues than Murphy had previously addressed in his work. The series was inspired by Murphy's reaction to ascendance of Sarah Palin into the national spotlight. Murphy says, "Sarah Palin scared the shit out of me in 2007 -- I was floored that someone that ignorant could come so close to being President. And a lot of her comments were about religion, politics, and the media. It made me want to take action, but I was just a comic book artist and I wasn't sure what I could do. So I started addressing my concerns about these three topics in Punk Rock Jesus. And I felt I really had something, but then Obama was elected and suddenly the need for Punk Rock Jesus was gone. I was an Obama fan, and I'm glad that Palin isn't anywhere near the nuclear codes, but I felt that I'd missed a window where Punk Rock Jesus would be most relevant. But [the 2012 election] has brought up all my old concerns, so suddenly Punk Rock Jesus feels relevant again." The series received positive reviews by Comic Book Resources, Weekly Comic Book Review, Bleeding Cool and IGN.

== Personal life ==
Murphy lives in Portland, Maine with his wife Katana Collins, having moved there from Brooklyn in 2016. Murphy was raised a Catholic, but is now an atheist.

== Bibliography ==
=== Full-length comics ===
- Crush (with Jason Hall, 4-issue mini-series and TPB, Dark Horse Comics, 2003)
- Batman/Scarecrow: Year One (with Bruce Jones, 2-issue mini-series, DC Comics, 2005)
- Off Road (script and art, graphic novel, Oni Press, 2005)
- Outer Orbit (co-writer/co-artist/colorist, with Zach Howard, 4-issue mini-series, Dark Horse Comics, 2006 – 2007)
- Hellblazer: #245-246: "Newcastle Calling" (with Jason Aaron, Vertigo, 2008)
- Joe the Barbarian (with Grant Morrison, 8-issue limited series, Vertigo, March 2010 – present, hardcover, February 2011, ISBN 1-4012-2971-9)
- Hellblazer: City of Demons (with Si Spencer, five-issue limited series, Vertigo, December 2010 – May 2011, ISBN 1-4012-3153-5)
- American Vampire: Survival of the Fittest (with Scott Snyder, five-issue limited series, Vertigo, August 2011 – December 2011)
- Punk Rock Jesus (script and art, six-issue limited series, Vertigo, July 2012 – January 2013)
- The Wake (with Scott Snyder, ten-issue limited series, Vertigo, June 2013 – July 2014)
- Chrononauts (with Mark Millar, four-issue limited series, Image Comics, March 2015 - June 2015)
- Tokyo Ghost (with Rick Remender and Matt Hollingsworth, Image Comics, September 2015 – July 2016)
- Catwoman (Vol 5): #23-24 (script and cover, with Blake Northcott, DC Comics, May 2020 - June 2020)
- The Plot Holes #1-5 (script and art, with Matt Hollingsworth, Massive Publishing, September 2023 - December 2023)
- Zorro: Man of the Dead #1-4 (script and art, Massive Publishing, January 2024 - April 2024)
- The Last Driver (with Simon Gough, five-issue limited series, Image Comics, August 2026 - December 2026)

==== Murphyverse ====
- Batman: White Knight (script and art, with Matt Hollingsworth, eight-issue limited series, DC Comics, October 2017 - May 2018)
- Batman: Curse of the White Knight (script and art, with Matt Hollingsworth, sequel to Batman: White Knight, eight-issue limited series, DC Comics, July 2019 - March 2020)
- Batman: White Knight Presents Von Freeze (script, with Klaus Janson and Matt Hollingsworth, spin-off to Batman: White Knight, one-shot, DC Comics, November 2019)
- Batman: White Knight Presents: Harley Quinn (script and art, with Katana Collins and Matteo Scalera, spin-off to Batman: White Knight, six-issue limited series, DC Comics, October 2020 - March 2021)
- Batman: Beyond the White Knight (script and art, with Dave Stewart, sequel to Batman: White Knight and Batman: Curse of the White Knight, eight-issue limited series, DC Comics, March 2022 - February 2023)
- Batman: White Knight Presents: Red Hood (script and art with Clay McCormack, Simone Di Meo and George Kambadais, spin-off to Batman: White Knight, two-issue limited series, DC Comics, August 2022)

=== Short comics ===
- Batman/Superman Annual as contributing artist
- Angel Spotlight: Lindsey as contributing artist
- Star Wars Tales #15 as contributing artist
- Star Wars Tales #19 as contributing artist
- Noble Causes: Extended Family as contributing artist
- Absolute Zero (prequel to Interstellar, written by Christopher Nolan, published in Wired magazine)

=== Covers and pin-ups ===
- Spike vs. Dracula five-issue miniseries and TPB (2006), cover artist
- Truth Serum TPB (2006), pin-up
- Batman Beyond 2.0 (digital comics) (2011), cover artist
- Empress (2016), variant cover artist

=== Illustration work ===
- Five-page comic for Land Rover in Onelife magazine (UK)
- Advertising illustration for Nike, Inc.
- Concept artwork Digilis with Peter Nelson
