= Punk Rock Jesus =

Limited series comic book by Sean Murphy

- Cover art for Punk Rock Jesus #1 by Sean Murphy.

Publication information
- Publisher: Vertigo Comics
- Format: Limited series
- Genre: Science fiction
- Publication date: July 2012 – January 2013
- No. of issues: 6
- Main characters: Sarah Epstein; Chris Fairling; Gwen Fairling; Thomas McKael; Rick Slate

Creative team
- Created by: Sean Murphy
- Written by: Sean Murphy
- Artist: Sean Murphy
- Letterer: Todd Klein
- Editors: Karen Berger; Joe Hughes; Jamie Rich; Jeb Woodard; Peter Hamboussi

Collected editions
- Punk Rock Jesus: ISBN 978-1-4012-3768-4

Punk Rock Jesus is a six-issue limited series comic book created by Sean Murphy and published by Vertigo. The series ran for six issues from September 2012 to January 2013 and was collected as a trade paperback in April 2013.

== Background ==
Punk Rock Jesus is a limited run comic book series composed of six issues that was written and illustrated by Sean Murphy. The first issue was published on July 11, 2012, by the DC Comics imprint Vertigo Comics.

A web campaign to clone Jesus Christ before December 25, 2001, may have been part of the inspiration for the series. The campaign was called the Second Coming Project and turned out to be a hoax run by an underground book publisher. In 2004 at the age of 23, Murphy started writing the series as a practicing Catholic. At 26 years old in 2007, Murphy became a militant atheist and began using the project as a means to express his frustrations and concerns with religion. In the following years leading up to the release of the series in 2012, Murphy became less militant about his views on religion and decided that a confrontational approach may not be the most productive. Murphy acknowledges that the series might be a controversial topic, but emphasized that he believes that if Jesus was cloned it's probable that we would turn it into a reality TV show.

== Plot ==
In 2019 an entertainment company named OPHIS (Greek for serpent) starts what's known as the "J2 Project", a plan to resurrect Jesus Christ. A clone of Jesus Christ is made with DNA from the Shroud of Turin. The young Jesus is raised on an island with his entire life dictated and televised and viewed by nearly the entire world. Faced with these stresses the young Jesus ultimately becomes a rebellious punk rocker. Religious zealots either love or hate the show and politicians begin to fret over potential influences on the nation. The scientific community fears the implications of the cloning itself.

=== Issue #1: Conception ===
The first issue of the series focuses on the characters that are involved in the J2 Project and their perspectives on it. The clone of Jesus Christ, named Chris, isn't born until the end of the issue.

The story begins with a traumatic event in Thomas McKael's childhood and shows his transition from an innocent child who grows up to be a member of the Irish Republican Army and was arrested for murder. McKael is hired as the bodyguard for the J2 Project.

Gwen gave birth to twins. Chris's twin sister was dumped into the ocean by Rick Slate. Shortly afterward, Sarah Epstein suddenly announces that she is pregnant with a girl.

=== Issue #2: Genesis ===
At the end of issue 2, Chris is still an infant.

== Reception ==
Giving the book a rating of 8/10 in PopMatters, Shathley Q. Abrahams praised the series saying it's "the best kind of scifi–a meditation on liberty for the cyber-age." Cory Doctorow praised the book writing on the blog Boing Boing saying "It's a near-perfect rocket-ship ride through some of the best material from comics like DMZ and Transmetropolitan". Brendan Frye, the editor-in-chief of Comics Gaming Magazine, gave the first issue a rating of 9/10 praising it for having "wonderful artwork and an intriguing storyline". Barry Thompson gave the series a 9.5/10 rating in Paste Magazine, writing that most depictions of Jesus in popular culture aren't innovative and rely on trope, whereas Sean Murphy's Punk Rock Jesus subverts tropes and is an interesting depiction of Jesus. John R. Parker praised the series in ComicsAlliance calling it the "most innovative, intelligent, and moving comic book to deal with religion and politics in a long time." Publishers Weekly gave the book a starred review calling it a "compelling, searching, and important tale". The series received a starred review in the LibraryJournal, where Steve Raiteri calls it "An audacious, nuanced, and hugely compelling tale". James Hunt praised the first issue in Comic Book Resources saying it is "destined for cult success". Oliver Sava praised the book in The A.V. Club, writing that the book demonstrates "remarkable inking skills" from Murphy.

The series spent three weeks on The New York Times Best Seller list reaching #4 for best Paperback Graphic Books.

=== Awards ===
Award	Date	Category	Result	Ref.
IGN Awards	2012	Best Comic Mini-Series	Won	
Utopiales	2014	The Prize for best science fiction comic strip	Won	
Publishers Weekly Comics World Critics Poll	2013	Honorable Mention	Included	

== Publication history ==
=== Issues ===
Issue No.	Title	Publication Date	Pages	UPC
#1	"Conception"	July 11, 2012	35	UPC 76194130323900111
#2	"Genesis"	August 8, 2012	34	UPC 76194130323900211
#3	"Exodus"	September 12, 2012	33	UPC 76194130323900311
#4	"Sacrifice"	October 10, 2012	31	UPC 76194130323900411
#5	"Disciples"	November 14, 2012	32	UPC 76194130323900511
#6	"Revelations"	January 2, 2013	33	UPC 76194130323900611

=== Collected editions ===
Title	Format	Publisher	Publication Date	Language	Translator	ISBN
Punk Rock Jesus	TPB	Vertigo Comics	April 9, 2013	English	N/A	978-1-4012-3768-4
Punk Rock Jesus (Kindle Edition)	ebook	Vertigo Comics	April 9, 2013	English	N/A	978-1-4012-4482-8
Punk Rock Jesus (Deluxe Edition)	ebook	Vertigo Comics	December 2, 2014	English	N/A	978-1-4012-5589-3
Punk Rock Jesus (Deluxe Edition)	HC	Vertigo Comics	December 2, 2014	English	N/A	978-1-4012-5146-8
Punk Rock Jesus (New Edition)	TPB	Vertigo Comics	April 1, 2025	English	N/A	978-1-7995-0099-5
Punk Rock Jesús (Edición limitada DC Black Label)	TPB	ECC Editions	November 12, 2019	Spanish	Guillermo Ruiz Carreras	978-8-4180-4359-8
Punk Rock Jesús	TPB	ECC Editions	May 30, 2013	Spanish	Guillermo Ruiz Carreras	978-8-4158-4475-4
Punk Rock Jesús (2a Edición)	TPB	ECC Editions	February 1, 2014	Spanish	Guillermo Ruiz Carreras	978-8-4159-9096-3
Punk Rock Jesús (Edición Cartoné)	HC	ECC Editions	January 29, 2016	Spanish	Guillermo Ruiz Carreras	978-8-4165-8179-5
Punk Rock Jesús (Edición de Tapa Dura)	HC	Smash Comics	December 21, 2017	Spanish	Guillermo Ruiz Carreras	ISBN 750-9-9970-2494-3
Jesus Punk Rock (Português do Brasil – Capa Dura)	HC	Levoir	September 1, 2018	Portuguese	Eduardo Tanaka	978-9-8968-2783-0
Punk Rock Jesus (Edição De Luxo)	HC	Panini Comics	September 1, 2018	Portuguese	Eduardo Tanaka	978-8-5836-8271-4
Punk Rock Jesus	HC	RW Editions	October 1, 2013	Italian	Stefano Formiconi	978-8-8669-1886-8
Punk Rock Jesus	TPB	Lion Comics	April 9, 2019	Italian	Stefano Formiconi	978-8-8293-0209-3
Punk Rock Jesus (Edizione Speciale)	HC	Lion Comics	October 29, 2015	Italian	Stefano Formiconi	978-8-8697-1102-2
Punk Rock Jésus (Vertigo Deluxe)	HC	Urban Comics	September 19, 2013	French	Benjamin Rivière	978-2-3657-7260-0
Punk Rock Jésus	TPB	Urban Comics	August 25, 2023	French	Benjamin Rivière	979-1-0268-2684-2
Punk Rock Jésus (Édition Anniversaire 5 Ans)	HC	Urban Comics	November 24, 2017	French	Benjamin Rivière	979-1-0268-1314-9
Punk Rock Jésus (Édition Black Label)	ebook	Urban Comics	September 15, 2025	French	Benjamin Rivière	979-1-0268-5480-7
Punk Rock Jésus (Édition Black Label)	HC	Urban Comics	October 2, 2020	French	Benjamin Rivière	979-1-0268-1555-6
Punk Rock Jesus	HC	Story House Egmont	April 23, 2025	Polish	Jacek Żuławnik	978-8-3281-6592-2
Punk Rock Jézus	HC	Fumax Publishing	January 1, 2022	Hungarian	Antal Bayer	978-9-6347-0233-7
펑크 록 지저스 [Peongkeu Log Jijeoseu]	TPB	Construction Company	February 20, 2019	Korean	弘二郎 [Hongjiro]	978-8-9527-9574-8

== See also ==
- Christ Clone Trilogy
- I'm Not Jesus Mommy
- Preacher
