= Birth of an Age =

2004 novel by James BeauSeigneur

- Cover of Birth of an Age
- Author: James BeauSeigneur
- Language: English
- Series: Christ Clone Trilogy
- Genre: Christian, Science fiction novel
- Publisher: Warner Books
- Publication date: February 2004
- Publication place: United States
- Media type: Print (hardback & paperback)
- ISBN: 0-446-61328-2
- OCLC: 54411766
- LC Class: CPB Box no. 2238 vol. 10
- Preceded by: In His Image
- Followed by: Acts of God

Birth of an Age is the second book of the Christ Clone Trilogy by James BeauSeigneur. It primarily chronicles the Trumpet Judgements as foretold in the Book of Revelation while also depicting prophecies from the Book of Revelation and the Book of Daniel.

As with the first and third book in this trilogy, many footnotes are used from various sources. These sources include not only the Bible, but sources that were used as the author performed research and analysis to ensure scientific accuracy in the depiction of fictional events.

== Plot ==
Birth of an Age starts after In His Image. The world is still grieving the loss caused by the China-India-Pakistan War. Christopher Goodman, the Alternate member of the United Nations Security Council for the European States assumes the Primary membership from Albert Moore who was responsible for the war. The United Nations sets out to provide aid to the survivors of the war. Two men, Saul Cohen and John the Apostle, leaders of a radical cult called the Koum Damar Patar (KDP), give prophecies of plagues. Only Christopher Goodman and his close advisors, Decker Hawthorne and Robert Milner acknowledge the prophecies. Plagues arrive and John and Cohen speaking prophecies about the plagues, quickly gain the world's attention. They become despised, being recognized as the harbingers of destruction, and they are blamed for the plagues.

Three asteroids are discovered, one of which is on a collision course with Earth. The UN launches a series of nuclear missiles at the asteroid in order to deflect or destroy the asteroid. The other two asteroids shift trajectories to a collision course with Earth. The first asteroid passes through Earth's atmosphere almost parallel to the ground, but close enough to cause incredible amounts of damage due to the force of the shock wave it makes, creating damage from Northern Alaska, in a southeastern curve through Canada, the United States, Mexico, Central America, Columbia and Brazil. Its entrance and exit to and from the atmosphere siphons off a huge amount of ozone, which allows the ultraviolet rays from the sun to destroy crops and causes worldwide famine. The second asteroid directly collides with Earth, striking in the Philippine Basin of the Pacific Ocean and causing seismic upheaval. The asteroid's explosion on the sea floor sent iron dust throughout the Pacific Ocean, which quickly turned red with rust.

The third asteroid is obliterated by the nuclear missiles launched by the UN. When the asteroid's dust reached earth, it contains a large amount of arsenic, which poisoned Earth's water supply creating a global outbreak of arsenic poisoning. Soon, locust-like creatures appear in massive swarms injecting people with a painful neurotoxin. After five months they die en masse. Christopher Goodman, the clone of Christ, discovers that he had the power of healing and soothes people who had been stung by the locust. He healed hundreds of people, including several members of the UN Security Council, and their families, as well as Decker Hawthorne. Christopher's supernatural powers make him popular, and he is nominated to the vacant seat of the Secretary General. During his acceptance speech, Christopher Goodman is assassinated by Decker's old friend Tom Donafin.

After Goodman dies, a homicidal madness spreads amongst the people near the mouth of the Euphrates River. Entire families, villages, cities, and nations are filled with rampaging citizens bent on killing each other. The madness destroys the middle East, southern Russia, much of Asia, eastern Africa, and south eastern Europe. Three days after Christopher's assassination, at his funeral, Robert Milner approached the coffin and laid his hands on it. Christopher Goodman is resurrected, the reincarnation of Christ.

Christopher explains that as his body was dead, he gained the entire memory of Jesus Christ all the way up to the time of his death, and gained other knowledge as well. He explains that rather than being a god, Yahweh was the member of a species called Theatans. Four billion years ago, these Theatans were at the same evolutionary level as humans are now. Their evolutionary process had stagnated, until it was discovered that the next evolutionary step - the final step - was a voluntary step taken by the species as a whole. The people of Theata took this evolutionary step, and evolved into spiritual beings capable of wonders only dreamed of previously. Eventually, one Theatan discovered that there was one further evolutionary step, although it was a state that only a single being may achieve. This Theatan, named Yahweh, took this step, and became a Godhead.

Christopher continues to explain that humans are now on the brink of the evolutionary step into the spirit as the Theatans, however, Yahweh does not wish to relinquish his hold on humanity, believing that if they evolve into spirits, they will be on equal footing with him, and will no longer serve him. In order to stave off this evolutionary cooperation by humankind, Yahweh has stricken the earth with the plagues of asteroids, locust and madness, and he plans more and worse plagues as time goes on. Decker and Milner resolve to do anything they can to help Christopher rally humanity against Yahweh and issue in the New Age of Humankind.

Christopher, Milner and Decker travel to the Jewish Temple in Jerusalem, Israel. Cohen and John are located. With a swipe of his hand Christopher sends them both flying toward the Temple at great speed, killing them on impact with the temple wall. Decker remains outside to talk to the press as Christopher and Milner enter the Temple with the intention of desecrating the altar inside, to put a stop to the animal sacrifices that take place there. Also Christopher takes the contents of the Ark of the Covenant and throws them from the roof of the Temple as he proclaims that he is the Second Coming of Christ, the Jewish Messiah, and Muhammad al-Mahdi among other prophesied figures throughout most other religions, saying they're all one and the same.

As Christopher nears the conclusion of his address, light beings, presumably Theatans, surround the temple and flood the Temple Mount. Christopher leaps from the roof of the Temple, and is suspended in mid-air by the light beings and he proclaims that everyone should "Behold the Hosts of Heaven".

== Literary significance and reception ==
Kirkus Reviews called Birth of an Age "Astoundingly intelligent." Jeff Zaleski reviewing for Publishers Weekly said that the ending will "shock some Christian readers, but many others will be enthralled by the author's science-fortified vision of the Apocalypse."
