= Batman: White Knight Presents: Red Hood =

Limited comic book series published by DC Comics

- Cover page of Batman: White Knight Presents: Red Hood #1 (August 2022)

Publication information
- Publisher: DC Comics (Black Label)
- Schedule: Bimonthly
- Format: Limited series
- Genre: Action; Superhero
- Publication date: August 2, 2022 – August 23, 2022
- No. of issues: 2
- Main character(s): Red Hood; Robin; Shriek

Creative team
- Written by: Sean Murphy; Clay McCormack
- Artist(s): Simone Di Meo; George Kambadais
- Letterer: AndWorld Design
- Colorist: Dave Stewart

Batman: White Knight Presents: Red Hood is an American comic book published by DC Comics under its Black Label imprint. The two-issue limited series - co-written by Sean Murphy and Clay McCormack, illustrated by Simone Di Meo and George Kambadais, lettered by AndWorld Design and colored by Dave Stewart - began publication on August 2, 2022 and ended on the 23rd of the same month. It is both a spin-off and a prequel to Murphy's Batman: Beyond the White Knight (2022), and is also the sixth installment in his self-titled Murphyverse comic book line.

== Premise ==
Jason Todd, Batman's former sidekick Robin-turned-vigilante Red Hood, joins forces with a young Mongolian girl named Gan—whom he also begins training to become the "ultimate" Robin—to help her protect Gotham City's East Backport neighborhood from the sound-based supervillain Walter Shreeve / Shriek.

== Publication ==
The two-issue comic book limited series Batman: White Knight Presents: Red Hood was co-written by Sean Murphy and Clay McCormack, illustrated by Simone Di Meo and George Kambadais, lettered by AndWorld Design and colored by Dave Stewart. The comic is both a spin-off and a prequel to Murphy's Batman: Beyond the White Knight (2022), and is also the sixth installment in his self-titled Murphyverse comic book line, whose titles are published under DC's Black Label imprint. White Knight Presents: Red Hood began publishing with the launch of its first issue on August 2, and ended with the release of its second and final issue on the 23rd of the same month.

=== Issues ===
Issue	Title	Publication date	Ref.
#1	"Book One"	August 2, 2022	
#2	"Book Two"	August 23, 2022	

== Reception ==
Reviewing Batman: White Knight Presents: Red Hood, Sayantan Gayen of Comic Book Resources noted how the limited series makes use of a non-linear narrative to "paint a complete picture of the past". Gayen also commented on how the comic book series' art style appears to frame characters in low-angle shots in what filmmakers often call the Dutch angle. Matthew Aguilar of ComicBook.com gave a rating of 3.5 out of 5, calling the comic book's art style "stunning" and praising the characters' dialogue and interactions as "charming and full of life". Ray Goldfield of GeekDad gave a score of 8 out of 10, as he felt the comic possesses the "momentum" that Batman: Beyond the White Knight has been lacking in its narrative.

== Continuation ==
After the end of Batman: White Knight Presents: Red Hood, Jason and Gan appeared together in Batman: Beyond the White Knight, starting in its fifth issue.

== See also ==
- "A Death in the Family"
