= In His Image (novel) =

1998 novel by James BeauSeigneur

- Cover of In His Image
- Author: James BeauSeigneur
- Language: English
- Series: Christ Clone Trilogy
- Genre: Christian, Science fiction
- Publisher: Warner Books
- Publication date: 1998
- Publication place: United States
- English publication date: 06/2003
- Media type: Print (Hardback & Paperback)
- ISBN: 0-446-61327-4
- OCLC: 52289430
- Followed by: Birth of an Age

In His Image is a science fiction novel by American writer James BeauSeigneur, the first book in the Christ Clone Trilogy.

== Plot ==
On a trip to Turin to analyse the Shroud of Turin, journalist Decker Hawthorne and Professor Harry Goodman discover human dermal cells remaining. After the trip, Goodman takes some samples back to his laboratory, in the United States, and discovers that they are still alive. He then invites Decker to show him his discoveries. Once Decker arrives, Goodman explains several of his theories about the cells, and has engineered a strain of "C Cells" which are incredibly resilient to damage and disease. Goodman is actively searching for ways these C Cells could be implemented to insert into one's body to cure disease, due to their strange properties and signs of immortality. Then the professor proposes to Decker the idea of cloning the cells, but Decker does not support this idea.

Some years pass, and Decker visits Professor Goodman with one of his two daughters. While Hawthorne and Goodman talk for some time, Decker's daughter meets and interacts with the Goodmans' adopted son, Christopher. On the way back home, Decker deduces Christopher's origin. He immediately returns to Goodman's home and confronts him about Christopher being the Clone of Jesus Christ. Goodman explains that Christopher is like any usual boy, but that he shows a high degree of intelligence and has never suffered from disease of any kind. He convinces Decker not to do a story, or Christopher's life will be ruined. Before leaving, Decker assumes out loud that Goodman named the child "Christopher" because of Jesus Christ, of whom he was cloned; but the professor rapidly corrects him, claiming that he named him in name of Christopher Columbus, since he believed that the child would usher the world into a new era.

Several years later, Decker visits Israel on business and stays with old friends, Joshua and Ilyana Rosen. There he learns much about the historical place and its notable culture. During his visit, Decker receives an anonymous phone call saying that "dogs will cry, but their tears will find no place to land" following the shootings of several Palestinians by Israeli troops in a riot. He immediately calls the police, and they tell him that the call must have come from Muslim terrorists, making a threat of some kind of massacre or attack against the Jews (to whom the callers referred to as "the dogs"), but they remain uncertain about where they plan to attack. Decker realizes that the terrorists who called him were referring to The Wailing Wall when they said that the Jews tears would have "no place to land". He rushes to the historical site, just in time to watch it blow up entirely. He saves a young boy from being killed by the blast. In retaliation for the destruction of the Western Wall, Israel destroys the Dome of the Rock and retakes the Temple Mount.

Decker later goes to check on the boy, but he is kidnapped by terrorists, along with his companion journalist and long-time friend and confidant, Tom Donafin. They are held captive in an unknown building in Lebanon. He and Tom remain imprisoned for three years. Decker and Tom escape; after one day, Decker had a dream of Christopher Goodman, who leads him to the exit. In the dream his captors are dispatched and lie throughout the building. Decker reminds the Dream Christopher that Tom was also held prisoner, and Christopher absent-mindedly shows Decker where he is. Upon waking, Decker discovers that his door is unlocked and his captors were dispatched in the same fashion as in his dream, and Tom was right where Christopher had shown him. Decker and Tom then make their escape into the countryside, where they are rescued by United Nations troops under none other than the Secretary General, Jon Hansen, with whom Decker forms an instant friendship and bond. They are housed temporarily in Israel, which is under attack by Russians, until it is safe for them to fly home. Transport is arranged for them to get out of the besieged city; however, a dogfight in progress causes Tom and Decker to exit the car to document the duel, and Tom tries to get pictures. The car, the driver and Tom are hit by a blast from one of the fighter planes. Decker survives, and Tom is assumed dead. It is revealed that Tom, however, does not die. He is stricken blind, however, from the explosion and from flying glass. Decker is informed that Tom's body was never found and he is presumed dead.

Decker is finally reunited with his family, and they return to the United States while Decker recovers from captivity. During his recovery period, there is a worldwide catastrophe that seemingly has no explanation. Millions of people wake up next to dead loved ones, and often whole families have died. This event is called "The Disaster" by most people; however, sudden converts to Christianity begin to call it The Rapture. Decker's entire family, along with his friends abroad, the Rosens, perish in the tragedy. Some collateral damage is also suffered: people driving cars suddenly die and their cars careen out of control; some commercial airline pilots die and their planes crash; and other damage occurs. Decker buries his family and then falls into a catatonic stupor as the weight of his loss consumes him. Later, Christopher Goodman arrives at Decker's house, explaining that his adoptive parents died in a plane crash piloted by a casualty of the Disaster. Decker shakes off his catatonia and invites Christopher to stay with him, and Christopher becomes his new family.

Jon Hansen offers Decker a position as his assistant at the United Nations, where Christopher encounters Robert Milner, a retired Secretary General who is heavily involved in occult practices, and recognizes Christopher as one who has been prophesied in New Age Councils to usher in a new era of peace and prosperity and enhanced consciousness for mankind. Alice Bernley (a thinly veiled reference to Alice Bailey actual noted Theosophist), a confidant of Milner's, also sees and recognizes Christopher and they befriend him, and Milner assumes the role of mentor to Christopher, not only in politics, but in a worldwide New Age movement. Meanwhile, Jon Hansen has been working on an ambitious project to reorganize the United Nations to better handle operations, and in light of the recent Disaster (The Rapture), he has almost open reign to do what he sees as necessary.

The UN is restructured with a central government led by the Secretary General, and ten Regional Divisions which include Oceania and Asia, Europe, Africa and the Middle East, the Americas, etc. Each of these regions is led by a Primary Regent who is backed up by an Alternate who serves as proxy when the Primary is absent. Israel is the only nation on earth that refuses to join the UN because Israel's regional partners are all Arab nations that would force them into an extremely unfavorable position of lacking representation within the UN. Meanwhile, Christian Fundamentalists, citing various prophecies in the Biblical Book of Revelation, identify Hansen as the Antichrist or "The Beast". This, however, quickly ends as Jon Hansen tragically dies when his helicopter crashes in Pakistan during a fact finding mission. The Office of Secretary General falls vacant and remains vacant. None of the Ten Regents believe there was anyone to be a suitable replacement for the extremely charismatic, popular, and altruistic Hansen. A rotation schedule is established where each Primary Regent serves as Acting Secretary General for a month. It is deemed that this cycle will continue until a unanimous agreement can be made for Hansen's replacement. Unanimous consent is proven to be almost impossible.

Years pass, and Christopher has been elected as the European Alternate Regent. Under the tutelage of Milner and Bernley, Christopher has embraced his spiritual nature, and Decker has provided him with pragmatic and political guidance. Under machinations of Milner and with the cooperation of various groups such as Freemasons and the Knights Templar with the funding from an occult clearinghouse known as The Lucius Trust (a thinly veiled reference to The Lucis Trust), Christopher comes into possession of The Ark of the Covenant. He gives the Ark to Israel as a gift, and in exchange he wants Israel to sign a treaty with the UN. A seven-year treaty is signed, promising Israel that they will not be impeded by their neighbors, and the UN recognizes their right to exist. When it is proven that the Ark is authentic - proven as Alice Bernley dies from looking inside - Israel agrees, joins the United Nations, and The Ark is placed in the New Temple that was built on the Temple Mount (previously retaken by Israel after the destruction of The Wailing Wall).

Albert Faure (previously named Albert Moore in earlier printings), an extremely aggressive and deft manipulator - as well as the Primary Regent of Europe - sets in motion a plan that he hopes will gain him the position of Secretary General. Meanwhile, Christopher, following a Spirit guide sets off into the desert for guidance after a series of extremely unsettling dreams about God and an impending feeling of global doom. When Christopher's journey into the desert nears its completion (after 40 days and 40 nights), Milner leads Decker to the desert where he says they will encounter Christopher who will need their assistance.

Christopher's "vision quest" has revealed Faure's plan to him, and he intends to stop it. However, they learn that Christopher is too late, because Faure's plan has already culminated in several strategic assassinations, as well as the declaration and execution of the China-India-Pakistan war, a nuclear conflict that lasts a single day, yet ends with hundreds of millions of casualties. No clear winner was declared or recognized in this war; however, Faure uses the incident to catapult himself into a position of power, at which time he forces a vote for Secretary General. He expects unanimous consent due to bribery, force, blackmail, and threats against the other Regents, and he is widely expected to win.

Just as the vote for Secretary General is under way, Christopher shows up at the United Nations and announces that Faure was responsible for the assassinations and is the single man who is responsible for the deaths of hundreds of millions in the China-India-Pakistan war. Faure denies this, but Christopher insists, and commands Faure to confess. Seemingly under the power of Christopher Goodman, Faure does confess and then immediately drops dead in front of everyone at the United Nations. It is concluded that Faure died under the weight of his own guilt, but Decker and Robert Milner realize that Christopher has extraordinary powers, and he was beginning to exercise them.
