= Christ Clone Trilogy =

Novel series by James BeauSeigneur

Christ Clone Trilogy (as Series)
- In His Image (Christ Clone Trilogy, Book 1)
- Author: James BeauSeigneur
- Language: English
- Genre: Christian, apocalyptic science fiction novel
- Publisher: Warner Books
- Publication date: 1998
- Publication place: United States
- English publication date: 06/2003, 02/2004, 03/2003
- Media type: Print (Hardback & Paperback)

Christ Clone Trilogy is a Christian science fiction trilogy by the American novelist James BeauSeigneur, dealing with the end of the world by presenting a fictionalized version of Christian eschatology.

BeauSeigneur's writing is compared to much more name recognized contemporaries, such as Tom Clancy, for its attention to detail. The series has also been compared to the better-known Left Behind series of novels, as both deal with the concepts of the Rapture, the Antichrist, and the Second Coming of Jesus.

== Components of the trilogy ==
1. In His Image
2. Birth of an Age
3. Acts of God

== Plot ==
The trilogy starts with In His Image, where living human cells discovered on the Turin shroud are used to clone a child, Christopher Goodman. The book follows Goodman's story by telling the tale of Decker Hawthorne, a journalist and the main character of the series. Among the main events covered in this book are the creation of Christopher, the rapture and Christopher's progress to becoming a key figure in the United Nations.

The trilogy continues with the Birth of an Age, in which a series of disasters and plagues assault the earth and its inhabitants. Towards the end of this book, Christopher is killed and then resurrected.

Finally in Acts of God, there is coverage of further natural disasters and the realization of Christopher's true identity and motives. This book follows through to the end of the world and life afterwards.

== Characters ==
=== Major characters ===
- Decker Hawthorne

Decker is the main protagonist in the series. Decker is a Vietnam veteran who becomes a journalist and world traveler. Good-natured but ambitious Decker grows more and more successful throughout the series, and ends up as Chief of Staff for the Secretary-General of the United Nations. The Secretary-General happens to be Christopher Goodman, his foster son, and prophesied Antichrist of the Revelation.

- Christopher Goodman

Christopher Goodman is the titular Christ Clone within the trilogy. Living dermal cells are obtained from the Shroud of Turin and are cloned by Professor Harry Goodman, who wanted to study cells which are resistant enough to remain healthy after 2000 years. The series, told mostly from Decker Hawthorne's point of view, chronicles the life of Christopher Goodman, his rise to political and spiritual power.

- Robert Milner

Robert Milner is a former Secretary-General of the United Nations who served as Christopher's spiritual mentor and moral compass during his early adulthood, and remains one of Christopher's closest advisors, confidants and friends. Milner is approaching 100 years of age, however, due to a transfusion of Christopher's blood, he appears as a vital man in his middle years, at the peak of health. He is Christopher's right-hand man in matters of faith and spirituality.

== See also ==
- Punk Rock Jesus
