= James BeauSeigneur =

American novelist

- Born: 1953 (age 72–73); Waltham, Massachusetts, U.S.
- Occupation: Novelist
- Spouse: Geri BeauSeigneur (m. 1974)
- Children: Faith BeauSeigneur; Abigail BeauSeigneur
- Writing career
- Genre: Science fiction
- Website: selectivehouse.com

James BeauSeigneur (born 1953) is an American novelist. He is a former intelligence analyst who has worked for the National Security Agency and the Defense Intelligence Agency. As an author, he has worked with the Department of Homeland Security by serving on “Terrorist Red Cells” to speculate on possible terrorist targets and tactics. He is a former newspaper publisher, and he taught political science for two years at the University of Tennessee in Knoxville. His background brings a special focus on scientific and political realism to his novels, which are heavily footnoted. His Christ Clone Trilogy has been published in 12 languages.

== Biography ==
James BeauSeigneur was born in Waltham, Massachusetts in 1953. At age six, he became interested in Christian eschatology. He served in the United States Army from 1976 to 1981, being assigned as a National Security Agency intelligence analyst. He ran in 1980 for the United States Congress as the Republican nominee against Al Gore, but left politics for a more stable family life. He wrote in the technical and fiction sector for regular income and creativity. His religious awakening started in the 1970s with the Jesus freak movement, and he writes in hopes of attracting non-Christian readers.

He has written numerous newspaper and magazine articles, including Military Avionics in 1985 and Strategic Defense the following year. He has also written lyrics for published songs. He is now a writing consultant to the U.S. government and is currently consulting with several Fortune 500 companies in support of their marketing efforts to government customers as well as working on a biography collection.

== Personal life ==
BeauSeigneur and wife Geri married in 1974. They have two daughters and four grandchildren.

== Bibliography ==
=== The Christ Clone Trilogy ===
- In His Image, Warner Books, 2003, ISBN 9780446531252
- Birth of an Age, Warner Books, 2003, ISBN 978-0-446-53126-9
- Acts of God, Warner Faith. 2004. ISBN 978-0-446-61329-3.
