= Acts of God (novel) =

2003 novel by James BeauSeigneur

- Cover for Acts of God
- Author: James BeauSeigneur
- Language: English
- Series: Christ Clone Trilogy
- Genre: Christian, Science fiction
- Publisher: Warner Books
- Publication place: United States
- English publication date: 03/2003
- Media type: Print (Hardback & Paperback)
- ISBN: 0-446-61329-0
- OCLC: 56569231
- LC Class: CPB Box no. 2316 vol. 11
- Preceded by: Birth of an Age

Acts of God is the concluding novel of the Christ Clone Trilogy, written by James BeauSeigneur. This book primarily chronicles the Bowl Judgements as foretold in the Book of Revelation, as well as the institution of Mark of the beast, and the growing persecution of the followers of God. Other biblical prophecies from the Book of Revelation and the Book of Daniel are depicted as well.

As with the first and second book in this trilogy, many footnotes are used from various sources. These sources include not only the Bible, but also sources that were used as the author performed research and analysis to ensure scientific accuracy in the depiction of fictional events.

== Plot ==
The book starts before the conclusion of Birth of an Age. Christopher Goodman's address from the top of the Third Temple in Jerusalem is revisited, concluding with Christopher leaping from the top of the temple, and caught by the visible Spirit beings, whom Christopher identified as Theatans on the flight to Jerusalem with Decker Hawthorne and Robert Milner. Christopher is an extremely popular Secretary General of the United Nations, who was nominated following his supernatural healing of various members of the Security Council, and elected unanimously prior to his assassination, and subsequent resurrection.

Christopher reveals to the world that humanity is on the brink of its greatest evolutionary step, which people are now heralding as the New Age. However, given the nature of this evolutionary step - that of evolving into nearly omnipotent Spirit Beings - this step must be taken collectively by the entire species, rather than through natural selection of individual members of the human race. If any significant portion of the human population balks at taking this evolutionary step, the evolutionary process will be a failure, and humankind will lose the opportunity to evolve, and remain a stagnant species doomed for extinction. The greatest threat to humankind in taking this evolutionary step is represented by Fundamentalist Christians and various Jewish sects, including a group of 144,000 Jews which call themselves the Koum Damar Patar or KDP for short. These groups remained loyal to Yahweh, whom Christopher has identified as a power-hungry Theatan, intent on keeping humankind as they are, in order to prevent them from becoming his equal.

Christopher vows not to let this happen, and declares the New Age, starting with year 1. March 11, the day of Christopher's resurrection, is declared New Year's Day. Three days after Christopher's address at the Temple, the bodies of John and Saul Cohen are called into Heaven. This is captured on tape by the media, but is dismissed by Christopher as dramatics by Yahweh to frighten people away from their destinies. A life-size statue of Christopher is erected at the top of the Temple, and speakers are set to broadcast Christopher's Address to Humankind in a repeating loop.

Here, Christopher also begins a revitalization plan for healing the Middle East, which was decimated in a recent plague of mass psychosis that affected every man, woman, and child in the region, which now sits bereft of humanity. The first priority in fixing this region is to rebuild the city of Babylon in Iraq. This site is chosen as a symbol of defiance toward Yahweh, since that was where humankind was first attacked by Yahweh when he afflicted them with tongues when they were erecting the Tower of Babel. He also indicated that he planned to move the United Nations main headquarters there, relocating from the Secretariat Building in New York City.

Throughout the world, people start experiencing brief moments of supernatural power. These powers include the ability to control others' behavior, telepathy, precognition, rapid healing of fatal injuries, and very detailed memories of past lives. Most people's experiences are very brief, mostly linked to a single incident, however these episodes happen all over the world and begin to happen more frequently. Christopher attributes this phenomenon to the fact that people are inching ever closer to that evolutionary step which will bring humanity into its New Age. Christopher then reveals that he will help accelerate this process, by instituting a Eucharist. This Communion remains a closely guarded secret, only to be revealed when the time is right. The communion is said to give people immortality along with great power.

Decker meets with Christopher to discuss this communion, and points out that giving immortality and power to the Christian Fundamentalists, KDP and the other Jews set against Christopher will be counter-productive. He suggests that the best way to keep Christopher's enemies away from the communion is use their own prophecies against them. If a mark is required to receive communion, as well as a pledge by individuals to aid Christopher and all of humankind by working toward the New Age, then Christians, Jews and the KDP will avoid taking the mark, and lack the powers, and immortality to continue their subversive behavior against Humankind. Christopher decides to show Decker the Communion. As they walk, Christopher reminds Decker that Christopher's foster father, Harry Goodman, had developed so-called C-Cells after the discovery of Jesus's blood on the Shroud of Turin. He also reminds Decker of Robert Milner's advanced age, yet remarkable health, due to a blood transfusion with Christopher years before. Decker correctly concludes that the Communion must consist of the distribution of Christopher's blood among the population. Christopher confirms this, and indicates that for the last two years, scientists and technicians have been frantically cloning Christopher's blood, and putting it in medicinal capsules. They enter a huge warehouse that was stocked floor to ceiling, wall-to-wall with Christopher's blood.

The mark of communion is a depiction of the numerals 666, since Christopher's name adds up to that value in the Hebrew alphabet, with the intent being to keep Christians and other religious fundamentalists away. As the opening of the clinics to the public draw closer, these clinics become the targets for Christian protesters. These protests grow more violent and when the doors are finally opened, the clinics become the targets of terrorist attacks, apparently by Fundamentalists trying to prevent people from taking the communion. Public clamor for the capture and punishment of these terrorists grows until Christopher is forced to take stronger actions. Capital punishment is extended to Christian terrorists, and their fundamentalist leaders. Other than zealots and terrorists, Christians mostly avoid the clinics.

Decker also avoids taking the mark. When confronted by Christopher, in his office in Babylon, Decker, now 72 years old, indicates that he doesn't want to live forever. He still misses his family who died in The Disaster years before, and although he is in no hurry to die, he will welcome the rest when it comes. Christopher points out that Decker, who had been writing speeches for Christopher, and had been promoting New Age principles and philosophies, must have forgotten that all that applied to him as well. His wife and daughters had reincarnated immediately after their deaths, and Decker will not be old and tired after the Communion, and he could go to them and reunite his family. Decker, very excited by this prospect, immediately heads out, and is on his way to the nearest clinic when he is abducted by the KDP.

The KDP take Decker to Petra, Jordan where he stays in a one-room building. He is confronted by Scott Rosen, the son of Decker's late friends Joshua and Ilana Rosen. Scott is revealed to be a member of the KDP and was instructed by God to attempt to convert him. After a violent outburst by Decker, which results in a black eye for Scott, Decker grew calm and attempted to not listen to Scott. Scott presents very convincing arguments about the existence of God, the accuracy of the Bible, and the messages it contains, and how Christopher was a liar and the personification of evil. Decker, unimpressed, says nothing and refuses to react to anything Rosen tells him. Rosen presents Decker with a Bible which belonged to Decker's late wife, Elizabeth, complete with her handwriting and notes. After another session with Rosen, Decker continuing to refuse to give Rosen the satisfaction of knowing that some of what he said got through, Rosen releases Decker from captivity, promising him a ride to Israel after their observance of Shabbat.

That evening, walking around Petra, Decker meets Rhoda Donafin, the widow of Decker's closest friend Tom Donafin, as well as his sons, Tom Jr., and Decker Donafin (this is the first Decker knew that Tom named one of his children after him, and it affects him greatly). Decker meets several people around Petra, and realizes that none of the people he met were anything like the overzealous, wild-eyed fundamentalists that he saw on TV, or read about in the papers. These people were caring, friendly and scared. Rhoda then indicates to Decker that they are to be attacked by Christopher and the armies of the world, even offering Decker a timeframe for when this is to occur. Decker promises that this is not the case, and if it is, he would talk sense to Christopher, and maybe they could all become friends - or at the least allies - in the evolution of Humankind. Rhoda reacts with an amused dismissal of Decker's promise, however the two remain friendly even if they disagree on this. Decker ate with the Donafins, and treated them to stories of their father when he and Decker used to share adventures and misadventures when they were younger.

After Shabbat, Decker is provided a ride, as promised, to Israel, where he catches a plane back to his home in Maryland where he plans to rest for a few days. On his way home, he notices that everyone bearing Christopher's mark is also bearing bandages that cover up painful sores and blisters. Decker decides to hold off on the Communion for a bit.

This first plague of sores caused outrage among Humankind who demanded that Christopher retaliate against Yahweh. The United Nations institutes penalties for sedition and collusion with Yahweh. Leaders of Fundamentalists groups are subject to capital punishment. The rationale is that although capital punishment is distasteful for many, removal of the opposing force is necessary to Humankind's evolutionary journey, and furthermore, individuals will be reincarnated free of their past prejudices and philosophies, and will join everyone else in the procession into the New Age.

During Decker's vacation, the next plague begins with the transformation of all the oceans of the earth to blood. The world watches in horror as all aquatic life, and anyone in boats during the transition from water to blood were killed. After a couple of days people in coastal areas grow sick from the decay and stench of the rotting blood, and the surface of the oceans begin to scab over. People are outraged and grow extremely angry toward Yahweh whom Christopher points out was responsible for this plague. A week after the plague began, Robert Milner walks out to a bloody coastline and throws a charged quartz crystal that lands on the scab, liquefying it, and turning the liquid back into water. The water begins to replace blood in a spreading radius, and after a day, all the oceans are once again water, although, they remain void of life.

The United Nations increases the penalties for sedition and collusion with Yahweh again, this time banning followers of Yahweh from engaging in commerce or owning property. It is made illegal to buy or sell anything to anyone not bearing the mark of Communion. Properties owned by those not bearing the mark are confiscated by the government, and residents not bearing the mark, evicted. Capital punishment is extended toward anyone showing an active role in the subversive behavior against Humankind and the New Age. Decker, by virtue of his position within the United Nations, and by virtue of very few people knowing where he was, remains undisturbed in his home in Maryland. Policemen issuing eviction notices bypass Decker's home believing that there's no way that Decker Hawthorne - THE Decker Hawthorne - would not have received the Communion, especially when record-keeping errors were not uncommon.

The week following Milner's cleansing of the oceans, all the bodies of fresh water turn to blood. Decker takes stock of all the drinkable liquid in his house, and hoards as much as possible. Decker watches on TV the various horrors that come from this plague. People dying of dehydration, people killing each other for groceries that have liquid (even cans of corn and peas are precious for the water inside), riots and looting. A week after the plague begins, Robert Milner walks into a bloody river, and cuts his own arm, mingling his own blood with the blood of the water. The water turns clear and pure. Exhausted observers make their way to the water to quench their thirst. Within a day all the fresh water of the world is cleansed.

In reaction to anger caused by the plague, the United Nations again increases the penalties for sedition and collusion with Yahweh, this time extending capital punishment toward anyone refusing to take the mark. Rewards are offered for turning in those not bearing the mark.

Decker, aware of what is going on, reads his wife's Bible to determine what will happen next. Decker calls his property manager, Bert Tollinson, and has him reinforce a room in his house with insulation and air-conditioning units, and stockpile ice. He warns Bert that extreme heat is coming, and he should do the same for his home so his family won't suffer. Bert takes Decker's advice. By midweek the extreme heat was taking its toll. People died in the heat. In Antarctica, settlements fall under the ice and avalanches are common in mountainous regions. The power stations around Decker's home fail, and Decker eventually collapses and is unable to move. Fortunately Decker's home had been so cold before and well insulated he manages to survive. After a week of the heatwave, Milner arrives in Machu Picchu and makes a plea to the sun-god to relent. From where Milner stands, a cool breeze comes forth, and within a day, the global temperature is back to normal. With the climate restored, Decker soon recovers.

The frequency of executions accelerates in retaliation to this latest plague. So-called "Execution Centers" are established to systematically murder those without a mark. As many as 20,000 people a day are killed in a single Execution Center. At first, only the executions of religious leaders and celebrities are televised. As the anger among humanity grows, so does their demand for televised executions, until some stations begin to show executions 24 hours a day.

A week after the heat subsides, a dark murky substance engulfs the entire planet, with the exceptions of Petra and Christopher's office in Babylon. Everywhere else is consumed by the darkness. Anyone in contact with the darkness (which is almost everyone on the planet) experiences terrifying hallucinations and horrifying visions. Sufferers are incapacitated with fear. This plague only lasts 3 days. After this plague Decker discovered that Christopher's approval rating has dropped from 95% to 11% as a result of the plagues. Decker feels guilty because it was his job to deal with the media and he has been home the whole time rather than doing his job.

In a televised address later that week, Decker watches as Christopher promises that there will be no more plagues and that humankind will receive three signs that their step toward the New Age is nearly complete. Sores would disappear, and telepathic and telekinetic powers would be acquired by everyone who wore the mark, permanently. Finally, Christopher promises that the last remaining vestige of Yahweh's followers are trapped in Petra, and they will all be destroyed.

Decker, horrified, decides to return to Babylon and talk Christopher out of destroying Petra. Since Decker does not bear the mark, he has to get Bert Tollinson to arrange his passage to the United Nations building in Babylon. Decker arrives at Christopher's office and immediately begins arguing for sparing the people of Petra. When Christopher refuses to talk about the issue, Decker realizes that everything that the Jews, Fundamentalists and the KDP had been saying about Christopher was true. Christopher finally shows his true self to Decker, admitting that he is the Antichrist and his only desire is to acquire as many believers that he could, and kill anyone who opposes him. Christopher elaborates that he took pleasure in "mak[ing] the Creator of the Universe weep".

Decker, defeated, realizes he, too, was responsible for Christopher's campaign of death and mayhem. He tells Christopher that when he and Decker are both in hell, Decker would be the one on his knees thanking God for giving him what he deserved. Upon hearing this, Christopher goes into a rage and murders Decker - but not before Decker apologizes to Jesus for what he had done, and is forgiven, denying Christopher Decker's soul.

Shortly after, the plague of sores that afflicted anyone bearing Christopher's mark vanishes. Followers also gain the strength, health and vitality of youth as well as the fantastic powers of telepathy and telekinesis that Christopher had promised them. All of Christopher's promises come true, and his popularity again surges. He plans for a march on Petra and invites every human on Earth to join him. They would use their new powers to tear down the city walls; killing the last non-believers and completing their transcendence.

The Jews within Petra finally join with the Christians in Petra as one people, when they had been reluctant allies previously. Several rescue missions are sent to Babylon and Jerusalem to find any remaining Christians and transport them to Petra. Some of those bearing Christopher's Mark try to gain forgiveness from God by amputating their hand, the only way to remove the mark completely. For those desperate enough to do so, the self-mutilation is justified by scripture: citing Matthew 5:30, "If thy right hand offend thee, cut it off".

As the people of the world gather in Tel Megiddo in the northern Jezreel Valley, Babylon is destroyed by an immense earthquake and vehicle-sized hail stones. Christopher placates those effected by promising to resurrect Babylon - along with everyone and everything that had been destroyed in it - once Petra has been razed. As Christopher issues the call to begin the invasion of Petra, Jesus Christ appears on the top of a nearby mountain. Christopher meets him there, and offers to allow Jesus to join mankind against the forces of Yahweh. For a moment all of Christopher's followers think they may be watching an historic alliance being formed. Christopher's offer is met with silence. After this rejection Christopher begins to brag to Jesus about how all these hundreds of millions of people rejected Jesus in favor of Christopher, boasting that "those you wanted as your bride have become my whores and sluts". The sudden realization of Christopher's cynicism leads to panic. Jesus forces Christopher and Robert Milner into a fiery chasm. Christopher's army quickly collapses upon itself as individuals vainly struggles to escape.

The epilogue features Decker's reunion with his wife and children, his brother Nate, and the Donafins, including Tom, as well as many friends and acquaintances from throughout his life. Decker also meets Jesus Christ who tells Decker that all is forgiven, and he is glad Decker has finally accepted Him, even if it was during Decker's final moments of life. Tom and Elizabeth explain to Decker what happened between his death and his resurrection. Decker mourns those who had not been able to join them in this Kingdom, but rejoices that he has his wife and daughters back.

== Reception ==
Don D'Ammassa had a mixed comment in his review for Chronicle saying "not to everyone's taste, including mine, but well enough written."
