= Joe the Barbarian =

Comic book series

- Cover of Joe the Barbarian #1 (March 2010), art by Sean Murphy.

Publication information
- Publisher: Vertigo
- Schedule: Monthly
- Format: Limited series
- Genre: Fantasy
- Publication date: March 2010 – March 2011
- No. of issues: 8
- Main character: Joe Manson

Creative team
- Created by: Grant Morrison; Sean Murphy
- Written by: Grant Morrison
- Artist: Sean Murphy
- Letterer: Todd Klein
- Colorist: Dave Stewart
- Editor(s): Karen Berger; Pornsak Pichetshote

Collected editions
- Deluxe Edition: ISBN 1-4012-2971-9

Joe the Barbarian is an eight-issue comic book limited series written by Grant Morrison and drawn by Sean Murphy. It was published in 2010-2011 by Vertigo Comics.

Morrison has discussed the inspiration behind the series:

I was obsessed with fantasy books when I was a young teenager – Tolkien, Alan Garner, Susan Cooper, Robert E. Howard, Michael Moorcock, Stephen Donaldson…. anything I could get my hands on. I even wrote two big swords-and-sorcery novels back then, but I'd never done a fantasy comic book before and it seemed like an interesting challenge to do a real proper kind of "Lord of Rings", "Alice in Wonderland" all-ages story for today.

The first issue was released in January 2010 (cover dated March 2010).

== Plot summary ==
Joe is a teenage boy with Type 1 diabetes. When his blood sugar drops and he enters a state of hypoglycemia, he begins to hallucinate, and enters a fantasy world populated with his toys and other fantasy characters. Here he becomes embroiled in a war with King Death, while in the real world he searches for a soda to fix his blood sugar. He knows there is one in the kitchen downstairs, but it is extremely far away, made farther by his medical condition affecting his mobility.

== Collected editions ==
The series was collected into a single volume:

- Joe the Barbarian (224 pages, DC Deluxe Edition hardcover, September 2011, ISBN 1-4012-2971-9)

== Reception ==
The first issue had estimated sales of 25,543, placing it at number 77 in the American comics market sales rankings. The second issue had 17,512 estimated sales and slipped to 97th in the sales lists, after which sales then stabilised with issue three estimated to have sold 17,674 (119 in the rankings), 17,102 for issue #4 (108 in the rankings), 16,725 with #5 (118 in the rankings), and 16,219 with #6 (118 in the rankings).

== Adaptation ==
The comic has been optioned for a film adaptation by Thunder Road Pictures.
