= I'm Not Jesus Mommy =

- Theatrical Key Artwork: Version 2
- Produced by: Bridget McGrath; Associate Producers: David L. McCormick; Joseph Schneider; Lawrence Lewis
- Starring: Bridget McGrath; Charles Hubbell; Rocco Hale; Joseph Schneider
- Music by: Karl Preusser
- Production company: Fortaleza Filmworks
- Distributed by: THEATRICAL: Global FilmDemic Ltd. VOD: Gravitas Ventures; DVD: Maverick Entertainment Group
- Release date: May 5, 2011
- Running time: 86 minutes
- Country: United States
- Language: English

I'm Not Jesus Mommy, also called Devil's Angel, is a preternatural thriller film. The film is an interpretation of the Book of Revelation and the End Times and centers around a secret human cloning project which attempts to reproduce the Second Coming of Christ, but the child is born without a soul and is, instead, the Antichrist.

== Plot ==
This sci-fi thriller concerns Dr. Kimberly Gabriel (Bridget McGrath), a seemingly infertile young woman who will do virtually anything in her power to conceive a child. Through the miracle of modern science, she inherits a cloned son named David (Rocko Hale).

For a time, all appears well, until David reaches his seventh birthday, and disasters suddenly begin to plague the earth—disasters that seem to be emanating from the young boy himself. Dr. Roger Gibson (Charles Hubbell) turns up and admits a long-buried secret: the DNA used to clone David came from the Shroud of Turin, the clean linen cloth in which Joseph of Arimathea wrapped the body of Jesus Christ that bears His image.

== Cast ==
- Bridget McGrath (Credited also Shar Stephanie) as Dr. Kimberly Gabriel
- Charles Hubbell as Dr. Roger Gibson
- Rocco Hale as David
- Joseph Andrew Schneider as Bruce

== Distribution ==
I'm Not Jesus Mommy had its premiere at the Twin Cities Film Festival September 30, 2010. It began its theatrical release from May 6, 2011, through May 13, 2011 in multiple theaters in the Minneapolis Saint Paul Metropolitan area. It also screened at the 2011 Los Angeles Film Festival.

The film was released in North America Video on Demand on January 1, 2012, by Gravitas Ventures and on DVD in 2012 by Maverick Entertainment Group.

== Reception ==
Chris Hewitt of the St. Paul Pioneer Press said, "Juares is nothing if not ambitious, and he assembles the pieces of the puzzle with clarity (he also edited and photographed the film). But he bites off more than he can chew..."
