= Tokyo Ghost =

Science fiction comic book series

- Cover of Tokyo Ghost #1.

Publication information
- Publisher: Image Comics
- Format: Ongoing series
- Genre: Science fiction
- Publication date: September 2015
- No. of issues: 10
- Main character(s): Debbie Decay; Led Dent

Creative team
- Written by: Rick Remender
- Artist: Sean Murphy
- Letterer: Rus Wooton
- Colorist: Matt Hollingsworth
- Editor: Sebastian Girner

Tokyo Ghost is an American science fiction comics series written by Rick Remender, drawn by Sean Murphy and colored by Matt Hollingsworth, released in September 2015 by Image Comics. The current story arc concluded in issue #10, with the possibility of a new story at some point in the future.

The series is set in 2089, a time when humanity is addicted to technology and entertainment. It follows the story of constables Debbie Decay and Led Dent, working as peacekeepers in the Isles of Los Angeles. They are given a job that will take them to the last tech-free country on Earth: the garden nation of Tokyo. Remender summarizes it as being "a big, visual, exciting story that at the heart of it is hiding the fact that it's really a love story".

== Reception ==
Tokyo Ghost was well received by critics scoring an average rating of 8.5 for the entire series based on 78 critic reviews aggregated by Comic Book Roundup. Sean Edgar of Paste calls it "a gonzo William Gibson-ish nightmare" showing "Murphy's transportive craft at its height". Jeff Lake of IGN describes it as "a pointed look at the evolution of our desensitized, now-now-now generation" and "absolutely bananas when it comes to action".

The complete, deluxe edition collection received a starred review from Library Journal, where Tom Batten called it "among the most fully realized graphic works of the last decade."

== Collected editions ==
Title	Material collected	Publication date	ISBN
Vol. 1: The Atomic Garden	Tokyo Ghost #1–5	March 2016	1632156636
Vol. 2: Come Join Us	Tokyo Ghost #6-10	October 2016	1632159147
Tokyo Ghost Deluxe Edition	Tokyo Ghost #1-10	July 2017	1534300465

== Film adaptation ==
In March 2021, Legendary Entertainment had begun development of a film adaptation of Tokyo Ghost with Cary Joji Fukunaga set to direct and produce.
