= Matt Hollingsworth =

American comic book colorist

- Born: 1968 (age 57–58) California, U.S.
- Area: Colourist
- Notable works: Death: The High Cost of Living, Catwoman, Daredevil, The Wake, Tokyo Ghost, Hawkeye
- Awards: Eisner Award: Best Colorist/Coloring (1997)

Matt Hollingsworth (born 1968) is an American comic book colorist. As of 2023, he was continuing to color comics for Marvel, including such notable titles as Guardian of the Galaxy, Punisher and Doctor Strange. He lives in Croatia.

== Biography ==
Hollingsworth graduated from The Kubert School in 1991 and began getting regular work from Marvel Comics and DC Comics. In 1993, he was hired to the Dark Horse Comics staff as head of the painted art department. After a year, he returned to freelance work and helped launch the award-winning Preacher from DC's Vertigo imprint.

He has worked on many titles for DC/Vertigo, Marvel, and others, including Catwoman, Batman, Daredevil and Alias. He won an Eisner Award for Best Colorist/Coloring in 1997, for work on several comics including Death: The High Cost of Living. He was nominated in 2004 for Catwoman. In 2006, he provided the colors of the Eternals book written by Neil Gaiman and pencilled by John Romita, Jr. Hollingsworth signed an exclusive contract with Marvel in April 2010. In 2012, he teamed-up with writer Matt Fraction and artist David Aja to publish a new ongoing series of the character Hawkeye.

In 2003, he enrolled in the Gnomon School of Visual Effects in Hollywood to become a visual effects artist in the film industry. He began working as a texture painter and technical director on such films as Sky Captain and the World of Tomorrow, Fantastic Four, Serenity, Superman Returns, among others.

Toward the end of 2006, Hollingsworth moved to Croatia, where he lives with his wife, Branka, and son, Liam.

== Awards ==
- 1994: Nominated for "Best Colorist" Eisner Award, for Aliens: Labyrinth, Aliens: Salvation, and Creature from the Black Lagoon
- 1997: Won "Best Colorist" Eisner Award, for Preacher, Death: The Time of Your Life, and Challengers of the Unknown
- 2003: Nominated for "Best Colorist" Eisner Award, for Alias, Daredevil, The Filth #1-3, Batman: Nine Lives, Catwoman, and Catwoman: Selina's Big Score
- 2004: Nominated for "Best Colorist" Eisner Award, for Catwoman
- 2014: Nominated for "Best Colorist" Eisner Award, for Hawkeye, Daredevil: End of Days, The Wake
