= Publication history of Dick Grayson =

This article is about the publication history of the DC Comics fictional character Dick Grayson, who has been portrayed in comic books alternatively as Robin, Nightwing, and Batman.

== Robin the Boy Wonder ==
Robin was first introduced in Detective Comics #38 (1940) by Bill Finger, Bob Kane, and Jerry Robinson. Robin's debut was an effort to make Batman a lighter, more sympathetic character. DC Comics also thought a teenage superhero would appeal to young readers, acting as an audience surrogate. The name "Robin" and the medieval-inspired look of the original costume are inspired by the legendary hero Robin Hood, as well as the American robin, which parallels the "winged" motif of Batman.

Dick Grayson is the son of John and Mary Grayson, a young couple who work as circus performers. In his first appearance, Dick is an 8-year-old circus acrobat, and performs with his parents as the Flying Graysons. While preparing for a performance, Dick overhears two gangsters attempting to extort protection money from the circus owner. The owner refuses, so the gangsters sabotage the trapeze wires with acid. During the next performance, the trapeze snaps, causing John and Mary to fall to their deaths. Before Dick can go to the police, Batman appears and warns him that the two gangsters work for Tony Zucco, a powerful crime boss, and that revealing his knowledge could lead to his death. When Batman recounts the murder of his parents, Dick asks to become his aide. After extensive training, Dick becomes Robin and helps Batman capture Zucco.

== Teen Titans ==
The 1964 comic The Brave and the Bold #54 introduces a junior version of the Justice League of America (an all-star superhero team of which Batman was a part). This team is led by the modern-day Robin, residing on Earth-One, who was joined by two other teenage sidekicks: Aqualad (the sidekick of Aquaman) and Kid Flash (the sidekick of the Flash), to stop Mister Twister. Later, the three sidekicks join forces with Speedy and Wonder Girl to form the Teen Titans, with Robin becoming the team's leader.

In 1969, writer Dennis O'Neil and artist Neal Adams return Batman to his darker roots. One part of this effort is writing Robin out of the series by sending Dick Grayson to Hudson University and into a separate strip in the back of Detective Comics. As a result, he appears only sporadically in Batman stories of the 1970s.

In 1980, Grayson once again takes up the role of leader of the Teen Titans, now featured in the monthly series The New Teen Titans.

=== Emancipation ===
Dick continues his adventures with Batman and begins studying law at Hudson University. However, Robin loses interest in his studies and starts to take on solo missions, and finds himself to be a capable crime-fighter. Shortly afterward, Raven summons Dick Grayson and several other young heroes to form a new group of Titans. Robin assumes leadership and moves out of the shadow of his mentor.

Dick, now 19, realizes at that point that he has grown up: he no longer relies on Batman, and he and the Dark Knight disagree on crime-fighting methodology. Robin's newfound independence and Titans' duties in New York leave less time for his former commitments in Gotham. He also drops out of Hudson after only one semester. Dick also rediscovers his self-worth among the Titans. Batman, however, is less than pleased. He informs Grayson that if he no longer wants to be his partner, then Dick would have to retire as Robin. Furious, hurt, resigned, and confused, Dick Grayson left Wayne Manor—but not for the last time. Helping him through this difficult time are his fellow Titans, including Starfire, an alien with whom Dick eventually falls in love. He hands over leadership of the Titans to Wonder Girl and takes a leave of absence from the team.

=== Nightwing ===
In pre-Crisis continuity, the maturing Dick Grayson grows weary of his role as Batman's young sidekick. He re-names himself Nightwing, recalling his adventure in the Kryptonian city of Kandor, where he and Batman meet the local hero of the same name.

Nightwing: Secret Files and Origins #1 and Nightwing: Year One show how Dick Grayson gives up his identity as Robin (having been "fired" by Batman). Uncertain what to do with his newfound independence, Dick considers giving up fighting crime to study law, but he could not imagine his life any other way. Turning to someone that he knows would understand, Dick asks Superman what he should be, if not Robin. In reply, Superman tells a tale of long ago on Krypton, about a man who was cast out of his family, just like Dick. He dreamed of a world ruled by justice and set out to protect the helpless and victimized as Nightwing. Dick then decides to honor the legendary Kryptonian by renaming himself Nightwing. This tale retroactively erases the notion that anyone else before Grayson and Bette Kane ever held the titles of Nightwing and Flamebird, except for the birds and the legendary figures named after them.

== Post-Crisis ==
Following Crisis on Infinite Earths, Dick's origins and history remained relatively unchanged, though few minor changes had been added.

Dick was a 12-year-old acrobat who would perform amongst many, including a 6-year-old Tim Drake. Following the murder of his parents, Dick would confront Zucco only to be saved by Batman. Bruce Wayne adopts Dick as his ward, though due to Bruce's image in the public, Dick believes it is simply for a positive public image. Due to Bruce's actions as Batman, Alfred became Dick's only confidant. Eventually, Dick would run off and attempt to avenge his parents himself, once again saved by Batman who later reveals himself to be Wayne. Bruce decides to train Grayson himself, who eventually becomes Robin, the boy wonder. During Dick's training, the two develop a father-son bond and eventually stop Two-Face, Hangman, and Tony Zucco, their collaborator.

Dick enjoys his first year as Robin, regarding the job as an adventure until a confrontation with Two-Face serves as a rude awakening for the young hero. The villain captures Judge Lawrence Watkins and Batman, and has each suspended from a hangman's noose in a "double gallows death-trap". Robin, trying to save the judge, convinces Two-Face to flip his trademark coin on whether or not Watkins would hang. Robin wins the flip, but Two-Face "honors" the deal by drowning the judge instead. Robin is unable to prevent Watkins' death and receives a beating at the hands of Two-Face, a beating that Batman witnesses, still tied up on the platform. Eventually, Batman frees himself and apprehends the villain. This event, however, emotionally scars the young crime-fighter. Rather than see Dick be further endangered, Batman "fires" his partner, sidelining him for a while, only to bring him back shortly afterwards. Four years later, when Dick is 17, he is shot in the shoulder by the Joker, which scares Batman into finally ending Robin's career as his partner. Seeking emancipation, Dick moves out of the mansion and joins the Teen Titans.

Jason Todd, who has become the new Robin, goes out alone one night to take down some drug dealers who are operating out of a warehouse. He is discovered on the roof and knocked through the skylight. As the criminals are closing in on Jason Todd, the thug who knocked him through the skylight is thrown through it as well. The drug dealers at first think it must be Batman, but it is Nightwing, who had been keeping an eye on the new Robin. After helping Robin defeat the crooks, Nightwing tells Robin to tell Bruce they need to talk. The next morning, Bruce tells Jason that Nightwing was the original Robin, but he had kept his true identity a secret from Jason because he felt it was not his place to reveal Nightwing's true identity. After Jason leaves for school, Nightwing shows up to talk to Bruce and finds out why he had been replaced. After several cover stories about how Jason had nowhere else to turn, and that Gotham had become too dangerous for him to continue fighting crime alone, Bruce finally tells Dick that it was because he missed him.

Later that night, Robin finds the same group of drug dealers where they have set up a shop in a new location, and to his surprise, Nightwing is there waiting for him. Nightwing gives Jason his old Robin costume and tells him he will grow into it eventually. They then agree to bust the criminals together, side-by-side.

=== New Titans ===
Bruce and Dick would remain at odds with each other for a long time due to each having feelings of betrayal for each other and neither accepting the blame. Following the death of Jason Todd, the animosity between the two increased. Nightwing would be sought out by Tim Drake, wishing for him to reprise his role as Robin. Dick's refusal would lead to Tim wishing to become Robin and Dick returning to the Batcave to plead Drake's case. He is recalled to the Titans when many members are abducted by the Wildebeest Society, his relationship with Starfire becomes strained and he is called back to Gotham, but he proposes to wed her. The wedding ceremony is interrupted by Trigon who forces Starfire to leave Earth. It is during this time that Dick is given his new costume.

=== The Prodigal Son ===
Following Starfire's abandonment of Earth, Dick returns to Gotham to find Bruce Wayne paralyzed after losing a brutal fight with Bane. Their relationship is once again worsened when Dick finds that Bruce did not leave the mantle of the bat to him, but rather Jean-Paul Valley. After Bruce returns as Batman, Dick finds he has no place in Gotham and returns to the Titans where he once again feels abandoned, due to Arsenal being placed as the new leader, and is forced to return to Gotham. There he finds Bruce once again feeling his back pains and reluctantly asks Dick to substitute as Batman, being his prodigal son. Much like he did with Jason, Dick grows a little brother bond with Tim Drake and lays demons to rest when he defeats Two-Face. When Bruce is well enough to return to action, Dick returns to action as Nightwing and begins to restore his bond with Bruce.

== Nightwing series ==
Based on Nightwing's increasing popularity, DC Comics decided to test the character's possibilities with a one-shot book and then a miniseries.

First, in Nightwing: Alfred's Return #1 (1995), Grayson travels to England to find Alfred, who resigns from Bruce Wayne's service following the events of Knightfall. Before returning to Gotham City together, they prevent a plot by British terrorists to destroy the Channel Tunnel.

Later on, with the Nightwing miniseries (September 1995 to December 1995, written by Dennis O'Neil with Greg Land as artist), Dick briefly considers retiring from being Nightwing forever before family papers uncovered by Alfred reveal a possible link between the murder of the Flying Graysons and the Crown Prince of Kravia. Journeying to Kravia, Nightwing (in his third costume) helps to topple the murderous Kravian leader and prevent an ethnic cleansing, while learning his parents' true connection to the Prince.

=== "Titans Reunited" ===
In 1996, following the success of the miniseries, DC Comics launched a monthly solo series featuring Nightwing (written by Chuck Dixon, with art by Scott McDaniel), in which he patrols Gotham City's neighboring municipality of Blüdhaven.

Upon the request of Batman, Dick journeys to the city of Blüdhaven to stop the gangster Black Mask. He then becomes the arch-enemy of the villain Blockbuster. Dick decides to stay in Blüdhaven until he destroys Blockbuster's drug cartel. After Cyborg is put in danger by a galactic threat, Dick reunites the Teen Titans to rescue him. They reform as the Titans, but Dick is pulled away to Gotham City when it is declared a No Man's Land. Following the recuperation of Gotham, Dick stays active as both the leader of the Titans and stays in Blüdhaven, but after the JLA disappears, Dick is named the leader of a new League. Following the deaths of Lilith Clay and Donna Troy, Dick officially disbands the Teen Titans, though Tim Drake would re-found them years later. Dick then returns to Blüdhaven and becomes more and more like Bruce, straining his relationships and eventually blurring the line between being a police officer and a vigilante. The vigilante Tarantula then kills Blockbuster and Dick refuses to save him, something that haunts him to the point of temporarily retiring from crime-fighting. At length, Nightwing shakes himself from his depression and takes responsibility for his inaction. He captures the Tarantula and turns himself in to the police. Amy Rohrbach, however, feels the world needs Nightwing free and so prevents him from being charged.

=== Infinite Crisis and 52 ===
Due to a crisis of conscience, Dick adopts the new villainous persona of Renegade to infiltrate the Secret Society of Super Villains. This ruse includes Nightwing aligning himself with his long-time enemy Deathstroke to track the manufacturing and distribution of Bane's Venom serum and to keep tabs on the Society's activities in Gotham and Blüdhaven. He also begins training (and subtly converting) Deathstroke's daughter Ravager.

Deathstroke takes revenge on Nightwing when the Society drops Chemo on Blüdhaven, killing 100,000 people. Dick tries to rescue survivors, but is overcome by radiation poisoning, only to be rescued himself by Batman. Nightwing confides that he let Blockbuster die and asks Batman to forgive him. Batman tells him that his forgiveness does not matter; Dick has to move beyond the Blockbuster's death. Inspired by his mentor, he proposes to Barbara Gordon, who tearfully accepts his proposal with a kiss.

Batman then entrusts Nightwing to alert other heroes about the danger that the Crisis poses. Dick flies to Titans Tower, but due to the chaos resulting from the Blüdhaven disaster, the OMAC onslaught, and other Crisis-related events, the only hero who answers his call is Conner Kent. They are soon after joined by Wonder Girl. Together, they locate and attack Alexander Luthor Jr.'s tower, the center of the Crisis, only to be repelled by Superboy-Prime. Prime is ready to kill Nightwing when Conner intervenes, sacrificing himself to destroy the tower, ending the destruction of the universe.

During the Battle of Metropolis, Nightwing suffers a near-fatal injury from Luthor when he attempts to save Batman's life. Originally, the editors at DC intended to have Dick Grayson killed in Infinite Crisis as Newsarama revealed from the DC Panel at WizardWorld Philadelphia:

It was again explained that Nightwing was originally intended to die in Infinite Crisis, and that you can see the arc that was supposed to end with his tragic death in the series. After long discussions, the death edict was finally reversed, but the decision was made that, if they were going to be keeping him, he would have to be changed. The next arc of the ongoing series will further explain the changes, it was said.

Saved by the Justice Society, Nightwing recovers with Barbara at his side. As soon as he is able to walk again, Batman asks him to join him and Robin in retracing Bruce's original journey in becoming the Dark Knight. While Nightwing is hesitant, due to his engagement with Barbara, she encourages him to go and returns his engagement ring so he can make an honest decision for himself. Barbara feels that it is important he rediscover himself, and until he does, they are not yet ready to be married. They part on good terms, though, before he departs. Dick leaves her an envelope containing a photograph of them as Robin and Batgirl, along with the engagement ring on a chain and a note promising he will come back to her one day.

Soon after his journey with Batman and Robin ends, Nightwing returns to Gotham, following Intergang's trail. He works with the new Batwoman and Renee Montoya to stop Intergang from destroying Gotham, shutting off dozens of fire-spewing devices spread across the city.

=== "One Year Later" ===
One year later, Dick Grayson returns to New York City (his previous home base with the Teen Titans) to find out who has been masquerading as Nightwing. The murderous impostor turns out to be the former Robin, Jason Todd. Grayson leads the Outsiders once again, operating undercover and globally.

Nightwing follows an armored thief named Raptor, whom he suspects is responsible for a series of murders. Later, Raptor himself is murdered in a manner similar to the other victims by an unseen contract killer, who proceeds to bury Grayson alive. Nightwing frees himself, wondering the relation between his experience and a mysterious voice who tells him that he is "supposed to be dead". Nightwing is having trouble finding things to keep him busy during the day due to the cast on his right arm. Incapacitated from his injuries, he tries without luck to find jobs, which forces him to take a job as a low-paid acrobatic instructor at a local gym, and continues to research into the mysterious assassin.

At one point, Dick agrees to attend a party for Bruce and their relationship seems to flourish. Bruce praises Dick for his success on the Raptor case, and also mentions to look into the Landman Building which hosted ex-Lexcorp scientists; most likely those who worked on the Raptor project. Dick also continues to keep a close brotherly relationship with Tim Drake, and helps Tim deal with his many losses during the last year.

After dealing with the Raptor issue, NYC is plagued by a villainous duo called Bride and Groom. Nightwing begins pursuit of these two after some grisly murders, including that of the Lorens family (close friends of his after the Raptor incident). Dick began to get obsessed with finding them, not knowing how far he was willing to go to take them down. Eventually, he formed a makeshift team with some "villains" to find them. They located them, and after killing some of his "team," Nightwing chased them to a cave, where Bride began a cave-in and the two are trapped there.

Nightwing, along with a group of former Titans, are summoned again by Raven to aid the current group of Teen Titans battle against Deathstroke, who was targeting the latest team to get at his children, the Ravager and the resurrected Jericho. Nightwing and the other former Titans continue to work with the current team soon after the battle with Deathstroke so as to investigate the murder of Duela Dent.

When the Outsiders were targeted by Checkmate, Nightwing agrees that his team will work with the organization, so long as their actions in Africa are not used against them in the future. The mission, however, does not go as well as intended, resulting in Nightwing, the Black Queen and Captain Boomerang being captured by Chang Tzu. Later, Batman is called in by Mister Terrific who then rescues Nightwing and the others. Afterwards, Nightwing admits to Batman, that while he accepts that he is an excellent leader, he is not suited to lead a team like the Outsiders, and offers the leadership position to Batman.

Batman accepts the position; however, he feels that the team needs to be remade to accomplish the sorts of missions that he intends them to undertake. As such, he holds a series of try-outs for the team. The first audition involves Nightwing and Captain Boomerang, who are sent to a space station under attack by Chemo. During the mission, a confrontation erupts between Nightwing and Boomerang, who has grown tired of fighting for redemption from people like Batman and Nightwing. After taking a beating from Nightwing, he manages to throw him into a shuttle heading for Earth and quits the team. Afterwards, Nightwing furiously confronts Batman. Batman does not deny his actions, and states that this is the sort of thing that the new Outsiders will have to deal with. At this, Nightwing resigns completely from the Outsiders, which Batman feels is best, judging Nightwing too good for that sort of life.

To help himself regain a sense of purpose, Nightwing opted to stay in New York again, and play the role of the city's protector. He takes on a job as a museum curator; and uses the museum as his new base of operations. During his short time there, Dick finds himself once again confronted with Two-Face, who years ago delivered Dick's greatest defeat. This time, however, Dick soundly defeats Two-Face.

=== "Titans Return" ===
Nightwing joins a new team of Titans, with the same roster of the New Teen Titans, to stop an as-yet unnamed offspring of Trigon from enacting his vengeance over Raven and the Titans of every generation. Nightwing yet again leads the team, and they manage to stop the sons of Trigon from accomplishing their first attempt at global destruction and again a few days later.

Following the defeat of Trigon's sons, the Titans are approached by Jericho, who had been stuck inhabiting the body of Match, Superboy's clone. The Titans managed to free Jericho, but found themselves once again in trouble, because Jericho's mind had become splintered due to all the bodies he had possessed in the past. Torn between evil and good, Jericho possesses Nightwing to keep from being captured. During this time, Jericho forces Nightwing to relive all of his greatest pains. Soon afterward the JLA arrive, intent on taking Jericho in, but they fail to apprehend him.

Following this, Nightwing decides to leave the team again, due to the events of the "Batman R.I.P." storyline and Batman's apparent death, as Nightwing feels his attention is better aimed at protecting Gotham City. Before leaving, Starfire asked Dick if he still has any feelings for her. Starfire reveals Dick's answer to Donna Troy that he has moved on.

=== Becoming Batman ===
As a precursor to "Batman R.I.P.", at the New York Comic Con 2008, DC Comics gave away pins featuring Nightwing, Jason Todd, and Hush with the words "I Am Batman" beneath them.

During the story-line, Nightwing is ambushed by the International Club of Villains. He is later seen in Arkham Asylum, frothing at the mouth and presumably drugged, believed by the staff to be Pierrot Lunaire, a member of the Club. Scheduled for an experimental lobotomy by Arkham himself, he is spared by the Club of Villains taking hold of the asylum, wanting to use him and Jezebel Jet, Bruce's fiancé at the time, as bait.

As Jezebel's capture is revealed to be a red herring, due to her being a part of the Black Glove, Nightwing's lobotomy is still pending, but he manages to escape by besting Le Bossu, and joining the fray between the Batman Family, the International Club of Heroes and the Black Glove itself. While he is forced to witness Batman's dragging down Simon Hurt's helicopter and seemingly die in a fiery explosion with his foe, he is shown holding Batman's cowl and cape, discarded during the fight.

Following the events of Batman's apparent death during Final Crisis, Nightwing has closed down shop in New York so as to return to Gotham, having inherited Wayne Manor and Wayne Enterprises per Bruce's will, much to Damian Wayne's dismay. He has opted to give up on having a normal job, and instead intends to put all his effort into protecting the city. After his returns he confronts Two-Face and Ra's al Ghul, proving to two of his mentor's greatest enemies that he is an equal to Batman after he defeated them. Dick then finds himself in charge of having to raise Damian, but at the time the two do not bond well.

In the following weeks Dick becomes far less emotional, unapproachable and uncontrollable. He lashes out at Tim, Damian and even Alfred at times and is mostly seen in his spare time mourning the loss of Bruce. Despite Alfred trying to explain to Dick that he is Bruce's prodigal son, Dick refuses to take up the mantle. After Jason Todd takes up the mantle himself, it is revealed that Bruce told Dick not to become Batman as he believed that Dick could carry the torch as Nightwing. After a long fought battle with Jason, Dick decides that enough is enough and with Damian as Robin, Dick becomes Batman.

== As Batman ==
=== Batman and Robin ===
Initially, many but Alfred were distrusting of Dick as Batman, even Superman. However, Superman grows to appreciate Dick taking over his "father's" cowl. Damian, though being the new Robin, is distrusting as well and decides to take the cowl of Robin in his own direction to make the character more independent from Batman. Despite his best efforts, Damian still falls short of Dick's skill when he fails to stop Doctor Phosphorus in Project Cadmus only to be saved by Dick. Dick then apprehends the Scarecrow, who nevertheless manages to escape the GCPD due to the help of the Black Mask.

Three weeks from when Dick donned the cowl, Two-Face figures out that there is a new man as Batman and hires a teleporter to attack Dick at the Batcave. With the help of Alfred, Dick manages convince Two-Face that he is the original Batman. Thus Two-Face flees from the Batcave, but Dick uncovers a jump-drive containing a case file of his parents. However, this discovery is never resolved.

Dick and Damian later apprehend a new villain known as Mister Toad. Following, they take down Professor Pyg and his Dollotron army, however, one is taken in, secretly, by Jason Todd. Dick then battles Firefly, who has broken free of the control of Black Mask. Black Mask is saved by Victor Zsasz, who is in turn rewarded money to be able to make people kill themselves. Taking advantage of the havoc caused by the Firefly, Hush manages to escape the confines of Wayne Manor and poses as Bruce Wayne, this causes Dick to have the Outsiders put tabs on him. Dick then investigates more into the Black Mask case and discovers a plot involving an invisible man, Man-Bat and the Huntress, which he manages to thwart at the last minute.

Dick's actions as the new Batman garner the attention of many and he is officially "crowned" the new Batman. He is then further offered a spot on the new Justice League of America. He readily accepts the proposition. However, due to his responsibilities in Gotham he acts as a part-time member of the new JLA. In Gotham, Dick diverts his attention from the gangsters and begins to investigate a murder involving Azrael. He teams up with Azrael to stop the murderer, Amon, and stops the latter from killing Robin.

When Mario Falcone returns to Gotham, the mob begins to make a comeback, Dick returns to focusing on the Black Mask problem, discovering the National Guard to have pushed him into Devil's Square. Manhunter apprehends Two-Face and is about to kill him before Dick and Damian manage to stop her, but Two-Face's trial goes awry, and the latter is pushed out of Gotham by Black Mask. As the mob attacks Black Mask, Dick is attacked by Hugo Strange, Doctor Death, and the Reaper all attacking the National Guard and the mob, having had incorporated Penguin's gang into his, Dick has a tougher time. He manages to, however, stop the Black Mask, discovering it to be Jeremiah Arkham, and pay more attention to Victor Zsasz's criminal activities.

Jason Todd and his Dollotron, dubbed Scarlet, then attack Dick and Damian, but the four are in turn attacked by the Flamingo whom they manage to defeat, but results in Damian being temporarily paralyzed. Dick then once again proves himself to be Jason's superior and apprehends the former Robin and imprisons him in Arkham and frees Scarlet of her Dollotron mask. Before Jason goes to jail, he suggests Dick revive Bruce via the Lazarus Pit, which Dick heads off to do, but finds Bruce's corpse missing. Blackest Night occurs and Dick forces himself to team up with Deadman to save Gotham from the zombie threat, they do so by freezing Gotham with Mr. Freeze's ice gun, which causes the zombies to relocate.

While many of the super-heroes realize that the corpse found is not Bruce's, Dick being unsure decides to carry out Jason's suggestion and revive Bruce's corpse. However, the creature that emerges is murderous and unintelligible, Darkseid's perfect clone of Batman, Dick fights the corpse but is severely overcome. Eventually, the corpse makes its way back to Gotham where it finds Damian, but before it can kill its "sons", it collapses and dies.

Dick's relationship with Damian then grows to a brotherly bond as Damian now accepts Dick as a son of Wayne, but is strained after Damian attacks Dick, later revealed to be controlled by Deathstroke in an attempt to sway Damian back to Talia al Ghul. Working together, Dick and Damian manage to defeat Deathstroke and Damian, shocked by his mother's methods, refuses to go with her and stays with Dick. The two then finish working on Victor Zsasz's criminal activities, which Damian manages to put a stop to.

Tim Drake then returns to Gotham City with the new JLA, giving Dick proof that Bruce Wayne is alive and well, but trapped inside the past. Out of rage, Dick would abandon the Justice League citing them to not get involved in his personal life after spending so much time working on their own lives. Dick then apprehends Oberon Sexton, whom he reveals to be the Joker, assassinating members of the Black Glove and finds out that Professor Pyg's virus is being carried as a Trojan Virus.

Dick and Damian then begin a final assault against the Black Glove and find a cure for Pyg's virus, which they transmit, but are attacked by the Black Glove at the Batcave. Hurt shoots Dick in the head, and attempts to sway Damian to his side, but the two reveal themselves to have been stalling and take down Hurt, who is then killed by the Joker. Bruce Wayne then returns to the past and helps the new Dynamic Duo take down the Joker, whom they send to Arkham, though the latter manages to escape.

=== Batman Incorporated ===
Bruce's return prompts Batman Incorporated, leaving Dick as the Batman of Gotham City as Bruce heads out internationally to create other Batmen for cities globally. Dick and Damian continue to investigate cases in Gotham, such as one against Absence, a criminal who attacks Bruce Wayne's former girlfriends. They manage to defeat Absence, but are unable to capture him. They then assist in the transfer of Jason Todd from Arkham Asylum, but the transfer goes awry when Todd is attacked by mercenaries, once again they fail to capture Todd after they defeat the mercenaries.

Following this, Dick temporarily moves to Paris to train the French-Algerian Batman of Paris, Nightrunner. Dick then assists Bruce to solve the case to find out who the Leviathan is and why they are attacking Batman Incorporated, until it was revealed to be Damian's mother, Talia al Ghul all along, and his final case as Batman is finding out the murders of James Gordon Jr., the commissioner's son. Following all this, Bruce returns to Gotham and Dick resumes his tenure as Nightwing.

== The New 52: Prince of Gotham ==
In September 2011, The New 52 rebooted DC's continuity. In this new timeline, Bruce Wayne again patrols Gotham as Batman and Dick is Nightwing. In the re-established history, there are some adjustments to Dick's biography. In the new universe, he is five years younger, making him 21 years old. He was adopted by Bruce as his legal ward at the age of 16 and not as his son due to Dick not wanting to replace his father, but after training Dick as Robin, the two gained a father-son relationship and eventually Bruce adopted him as his son. After graduating high school, Dick founded the Teen Titans and began to study law.

His activities with the Titans would lead to him to having a fallout with Bruce and straining their relationship and forcing him to become Nightwing. Their relationship with each other would worsen throughout the years and only begin to restore until after Bruce, with a broken back, lets Dick substitute as Batman, being his prodigal son. Following Bruce's absence, Dick became Batman and Damian Wayne his Robin but Bruce's return sparked changes in the city that forced Dick to return as Nightwing after a whole year of being Batman.

Due to his time as Batman, Dick has grown a much darker attitude. After helping Bruce quell an uprising at Arkham Asylum, posing as the Joker to be a man on the inside, Dick is attacked by an assassin named Saiko who quickly figures out he is Nightwing. While Saiko escapes, Dick flies over to Atlantic City and is given the deed to Haley's Circus by Jack Haly himself, as repentance for letting Dick's parents die. On the way back, Dick starts a relationship with his former circus friend, Raya. Saiko then murders Mr. Haly.

Dick then begins to tour Haley's Circus around America into such areas as Chicago and Miami all while looking for the circus' past, which Mr. Haly cited as the reason Saiko was attacking Dick. Around the circus' quarters, Dick finds a Black Book of Names, of which at the very end is Dick's himself, one of the name's however, is William Cobb, the Talon who is attacking Bruce Wayne. Dick then learns of a Flying Grayson's Memorial Show happening in Gotham, he angrily protests against the show, but his requests are denied. At the show, Saiko reveals himself to be Dick's childhood friend, Raymond, blaming Dick for his disfigurement, he detonates explosives. After confronting Batman about Saiko and the Court of Owls, he learns them to be connected to William Cobb, whom he discovers to be his great grandfather. As Dick investigates a murder with his weapons on the scene, he finds he must fight Cobb. The two fight and Nightwing is berated by Cobb for throwing away all the sacrifices the Talon made to ensure Dick "save" Gotham. Nightwing would eventually come out on top and defeat Cobb.

Nightwing writer Kyle Higgins would reveal that the overarching Prince of Gotham storyline set into motion due to the Night of the Owls would involve Dick realizing his place in Gotham. He also revealed that the storyline would be about Dick's status in Gotham elevating, him questioning his role in Gotham and whether what he does for the city is worth it and what the future of Gotham is to that point. When pressed for detail on the arc, who would appear and what changes would come to Dick, Higgins provided the following explanation:

"[T]he arc will be introducing a lot of new characters who will be in the book going forward. We've got everyone from Deputy Mayor Kavanaugh, who was introduced in "Night of the Owls" but you'll be seeing more of him in this arc; Sonia Zucco is coming back to the Bat world and she'll be in the book going forward; you've got a new detective who may or may not be framing Nightwing. And Nightwing himself, Dick Grayson, is coming out of everything with the Owls and looking towards the future. He's taking a new approach, he's got some ideas on how to make a difference in Gotham City."

During the "Death of the Family" event, one of Dick's friends Jimmy Clark who worked as a circus clown was murdered by the Joker because the Joker felt like Jimmy was a knockoff of him. Nightwing later discovers the Joker broke Raya out of prison and infected her with his toxin and has forced her to fight while wearing a makeshift Nightwing costume. The toxin eventually killed Raya, though Nightwing tried in vain with an anti-toxin to save her. Nightwing then discovered that the Joker left a message on Raya's abdomen that he was targeting Haly's Circus next. However, upon arriving there, the Joker unveils his plan to burn the circus to the ground and then infects Nightwing with his gas that not only causes him to experience hallucinations of Jimmy and Raya, but he is soon attacked by the other members of Haly's Circus that were also affected by the toxin, allowing the Joker to capture him. The events of "Death of the Family" destroyed Dick's life, with the Joker ruining his project for renovating Amusement Mile. The Joker also bankrupted him, as Dick invested all of his money into the project as a result of Sonia Zucco's initial refusal to fund the project. Following this, it led to a major shift in Nightwing's status quo. In the aftermath, Haly's Circus is gone, with Dick broke as a result for having lost his investment. While the other circus members survived since the Joker used a different toxin on them, they blame Dick and decide to leave after Raya and Jimmy's funeral, though deep down they know it is not his fault. Dick becomes bitter from his loss and after he used excessive force to bring down some criminals that tried to plunder valuables from the remains of the circus, Damian Wayne, who had been monitoring him, is able to talk some sense into Nightwing that helped him recover.

Nightwing is deeply affected by the death of Damian Wayne following his murder at the hands of Damian's clone, Heretic. He soon helps Batman in avenging Damian's death by defeating Heretic in combat, before Heretic is killed by Damian's mother and his clone's creator, Talia al Ghul. He then helps the rest of Batman Incorporated in defeating Talia's Leviathan terrorist organization, before she is finally killed by Kathy Kane (the original Batwoman), who is revealed to be still alive as an agent of Spyral. Unknown to Dick and the rest of the Bat-Family, Bruce (thanks to Alfred) discovers that Damian's corpse has been stolen by the League of Assassins along with Talia's for a plot against Batman, that he (along with Alfred) decides to keep secret from them since.

With Damian's death and potential resurrection becoming an obsession of Batman's, Dick is shunned by Bruce when he tries to tell him to move on.

Sonia Branch, the daughter of Tony Zucco, the crime boss who murdered Dick's parents, reveals to Dick an e-mail that indicates that Zucco is still alive. After giving the address to the Red Robin to try and track down who sent it, Robin uncovers that Zucco is residing in Chicago. Nightwing moves to Chicago to find and arrest Zucco, who is now living under the identity of Billy Lester. Soon after arriving in Chicago, Dick meets his new roommates, a photojournalist named Michael, and a computer specialist named Joey. After leaving the apartment to meet with Johnny Spade, a borderline criminal who steals and sells information, their meeting is interrupted by the Chicago PD, which, after a short chase, accidentally destroys the Chicago subway. Meanwhile, a criminal hacker called the Prankster tortures, maims and kills criminal conmen who are untouchable to the police.

After the Crime Syndicate invaded Prime Earth and defeated the Justice League, Nightwing was captured, and his secret identity revealed to the world. Following their escape from the Syndicate, Batman and Catwoman decide to rescue him. He then is invited by Owlman to help take down the Crime Syndicate, in which he accepts. During his captivity, Nightwing is imprisoned in a containment unit, with his heart monitored to set off a bomb should he attempt to escape. The alliance of Batman, Lex Luthor, Catwoman, Captain Cold, Bizarro, Sinestro, Black Manta and Black Adam break into the fallen Watchtower to free him, but also to sabotage the Syndicate. When they are detected, the bomb is triggered to detonate in minutes. Batman tries to free Nightwing, but Luthor, believing there was no time, incapacitates Batman and Catwoman before suffocating Grayson until he dies, and the bomb is deactivated. An enraged Batman begins to brutalize Luthor, while Luthor tries to tell him that there may be still time to save Dick. Luthor in an uncharacteristically heroic moment injects his heart with a shot of adrenaline successfully reviving Grayson and saving his life as well as the others. Cyborg enters having defeated Grid and Grayson joins Batman, Cyborg and Catwoman in freeing the Justice League from the Firestorm matrix. After the defeat of the Syndicate, Grayson is seen with Batman in the Batcave. Batman tells him that he has to send him on the most dangerous mission he could possibly undertake. The Nightwing title concluded in April at issue #30, and was replaced with a new title, Grayson, in July, where after surviving the Murder Machine and the world believing that he is dead with only Batman knowing he survived in the aftermath of the Crime Syndicate's invasion, Dick gave up his life as Nightwing and went undercover by becoming an agent of Spyral, the secretive counter-intelligence organization that previously helped Batman Incorporated, where the former Batwoman Kathy Kane works.

=== "Agent of Spyral" ===
In the "Agent of Spyral" storyline, Dick (known as Agent 37) is enlisted by Mister Minos, the director of Spyral, after having been chosen by Helena Bertinelli to serve as a new candidate. However, Dick serves as a mole under Batman due to their agenda of unmasking heroes by collecting the Paragon organs, organs which contain the DNA of the Justice League and bestows on meta-bioweapons the ability to use their powers. He assists Spyral's agenda to know more about Minos and his endgame, resulting in Spyral attaining most of the scattered organs. In a later story arc, Minos betrays Spyral and attempts to leak its secrets. To his surprise, he finds the new Agent Zero, who reveals that she, along with the upper echelon of Spyral, had used Minos to attract Dick into Spyral and kills Minos, as he has outlived his usefulness.

During Batman and Robin Eternal, Grayson finds himself working with various other members of the Bat-Family - during the time when Bruce Wayne is amnesic after his resurrection - against the ruthless villain known only as 'Mother', who it is revealed briefly brainwashed Batman himself early in Grayson's career as Robin. Mother intends to trigger a global collapse with the reasoning that the survivors will rebuild a stronger world after being broken by tragedy and without the hindrance of parents to force their ideals on them, but Grayson and the rest of the Family are able to defeat her. At the conclusion of the story-line, Dick meets with the restored Batman, assuring Bruce that, unlike Mother, he never forced his ideals on them, but simply gave them all an example that they chose to emulate, while avoiding following it so exactly that they became like him.

In the Robin War crossover, when the Court of Owls plant a bomb in Damian Wayne (who comes back from the dead), they are able to blackmail Dick into officially joining their organization, although all sides are aware that Grayson intends to try and use his new position against them. Dick's tenure as an agent of Spyral ends, when it was revealed that all knowledge of his identity was erased from most of the world with one of Spyral's satellites, thus allowing Dick to resume his superhero activities as Nightwing once again.

== Return as Nightwing ==
Dick returns to being Nightwing in his black and blue costume, starting with the DC Rebirth relaunch in 2016, and he will use his new skills and expertise in espionage moving forward. Nightwing is featured in two DC Rebirth books: Nightwing (vol. 4), his own solo book, and Titans, where Dick teams up with the other original Teen Titans after Wally West returns to the universe; through Wally, Dick remembers events of his life in the new DC Rebirth timeline that resembles both of the Pre-Flashpoint's and The New 52's.

In his solo book, Dick is paired with a vigilante named Raptor and the two plan to bring down the Court of Owls from the inside. Barbara criticizes Dick's willingness to trust him and doesn't agree with his methods. Though Raptor seemed willing to play by Dick's rules of not killing, he tricks Dick into agreeing to a plan that results in the deaths of all of the Parliament of Owls in Sydney. After knocking Dick out, Raptor goes to Gotham and kidnaps Bruce during a conference. Nightwing confronts him alone in the ruins of a circus in Paris. Raptor reveals that he grew up in the circus as a child and fell in love with Dick's mother, Mary, as they stole from the rich and powerful in Paris. Raptor watched over Dick in the shadows as he grew up, and developed a hatred for Bruce Wayne, as he represented everything he and Mary were against and felt it was dishonoring her memory to have Dick raised by him. Dick defeats Raptor and rescues Bruce in time.

After joining forces with the pre-Flashpoint Superman to defeat the latest attack of Doctor Destiny, Dick decided to relocate to Blüdhaven based on Superman's reference to how the pre-Flashpoint Grayson acted as the city's guardian for a time, hoping to build a life beyond Gotham City like his counterpart. While there, he meets a supervillain rehabilitation group called the Run-Offs, all of which were villains he and Batman had defeated in the past. He finds that most of them are being framed for crimes around the area and works with them to find the true culprits. After solving the case and clearing their names, Dick begins dating their leader Shawn Tsang, the former criminal known as the Defacer. Shawn is kidnapped by Professor Pyg after Dick discovers she might be pregnant with his child, and he teams up with Damian to track Pyg down and rescue her. After Shawn is revealed not to be pregnant, she ultimately breaks up with Dick, who focuses his efforts on taking down criminals such as the Blockbuster, the returning Raptor, the Judge, and Wyrm.

During one of his nightly patrols with Batman, Nightwing is shot by KGBeast and nearly killed. As a result, he suffered from severe memory loss and attempted to build a new life in Blüdhaven. He changed his name to Ric, gave up being Nightwing, and became a taxi driver that frequently went to bars. With Blüdhaven suffering from an increase in crime from the vigilante's absence, a detective named Sapienza comes across Dick's abandoned hideout in the subway and decides to become the new Nightwing. Sapienza recruits a team of his friends in law enforcement to help him, and together they make a team of Nightwings using Dick's old uniforms. In addition to Sapienza, the team consists of Malcolm Hutch, the deputy chief in the Blüdhaven fire department, Zak Edwards, vice of the 10th precinct, and Colleen Edwards, detective of the 14th precinct.

During the Year of the Villain, Dick Grayson is captured by William Cobb, his grandfather who is a Talon. William Cobb forces Dick to wear goggles, putting him under his spell. Dick, as a Talon, fights off other Nightwing heroes. A Nightwing hero named Connor Red shoots at Dick's mask, making his eye visible. Connor Red pleads for mercy saying he has a family, and as the sun comes up Dick suddenly breaks out of his grandfather's control. Dick starts to remember his adventures as Nightwing (like Forever Evil, the Joker, and Bane). Dick defeats Talon, and saves his girlfriend Bea. Dick admits that he has memories of himself as Nightwing, but right now all he wants to do is spend time with Bea. Afterwards, he journeys to Switzerland to learn more answers about his past from Dr. Haas, who attempts to use the crystal to alter his memories once more. However, an explosion seemingly sends her down a river to her death while Ric is able to retrieve the memory crystal, she used on him. During the "Joker War" storyline, the Joker steals the memory crystal and uses it to brainwash Grayson into believing he is the Joker's adopted son, "Dicky Boy" and turns him against the Bat Family in his latest war against Batman. After Barbara gets the crystal back, Bea uses it to allow him to fully regain his memories as Dick.

Returning to his role as Blüdhaven's protector, Grayson is informed by Barbara Gordon that he has been bequeathed a fortune by Alfred Pennyworth, accumulated during his years of service to the Wayne family. He decides to use this newfound wealth to establish a philanthropic foundation to revitalize Blüdhaven, while continuing to fight corruption and crime as Nightwing. In both efforts, he is opposed by Blockbuster as well as a new villain, Heartless, who steals peoples' hearts to sustain his own life. He is supported by Barbara, who reclaims her mantle as Batgirl; Tim Drake, once again operating as Robin; the Titans; Jon Kent, who is publicly operating as Superman in his father's absence; and two unexpected new allies: the new mayor of Blüdhaven, who is his previously unknown half-sister, and a pit bull puppy whom Grayson adopts and names Haley.

== See also ==
- Golden Age of Comic Books
- Silver Age of Comic Books
- Bronze Age of Comic Books
- Modern Age of Comic Books
- List of Batman comics
- List of Superman comics
- List of Spider-Man titles
- Publication history of Anarky
- Publication history of Superman
- Publication history of Wonder Woman
